= List of villages in Ogun State =

Villages in Nigeria

This is a list of villages and settlements in Ogun State, Nigeria, organised by local government area (LGA) and district/area (with postal codes also given).

== By postal code ==
LGA	District / Area	Postal code	Villages
Abeokuta North	Abeokuta (Rural)	110101	2nd Ogun River Bridge; Abese; Abesin Isale; Abesin Oke; Abomolaso; Abule - Aje; Abule -Oke Sabo Area; Abule Adelanwa; Abule Nla; Abule odunjo; Abule Ohori; Abule Oko; Abule Olowojo; Abule Olowun; Abule Owe; Abule Titun Village; Adeku; Adeleye; Adeotan; Adeyori; Afagba; Afonja; Agarawu; Agbanla; Agbawo; Ago - Odo; Ago - Owu; Ago-Ika, oja Agbo; Agunmona; Ajana; Ajegunle; Akala; Akere; Akin olugbade; Akinmade Oloro; Akinwunmi; Akiode; Akomoje; Alamaa; Alamala Barrack; Alapako Idi-Emi; Alapo; Alaru; Amoror N.T.A; Amukankan; Anifa; Anigbagbo; Anima-Saun; Animale; Apana; Apapa oluwa; Apo-Owu; Araromi - Aiyetoro; Aro Hospital; Aro village; Asani; Aseeso; Asipa Ijeja; Ata; Atapa Ikoyi; Atapa Ishaga; Ate; Babalogun; Banjoko; Base; Base Olodi; Bembe; Bosero; Church; Daga; Dasogunjo; Dega; Denro; Ekefun; Ekerin; Eko; Elega; Elepo; Elewuro; Eruku; Erunbe; Fafunke; Fagbenro; Falano; GAA; Garage Area; Gbengeri; Gbolaku; Gbomolese; Gbopa; Housing Elega; Ibara Orile; Ibaro; Iberekodo; Idan, Iwo, ijaye; Idere; Idi emi; Idi Emo; Idi Igba; Idi Ori; Idi-Iya/Onisasa; Idiro Lanlowo; Idiroko; Idofin; Idomapa; Igbeyin; Igbo - Aje; Igbo Egun; Igbogbede; Igosun; Ija Ofa, Ikeye; Ijaaye Onipepeye; Ijaiye Deyorin; Ijaje Road; Ijako; Ijemo; Ijesha; Ijeun; Ika Ajibefun; Ika Oloba; Ikerek; Ikereku; Ikereku Idan; Ikija; Ila -Olona; Ilakan; Ilawo; Ilewo; Ilewo Township; Ilugun; Ilugun Agunrin (Mokola); Ilugun Isale; Ilugun Itun Oluwo; Imala; Ind. Est. (Idi-Ori; Ipaya Akintunde; Isaga Orile; Isaga Township; Isagbesan; Ita - Kinoshi; Ita Balogun; Ita Iyalode; Ita Morin; Ita Oje, Oke Iddo; Ita Oshin; Itaka, Ajitadun; Iyalo Iliewo Oke; Iyaye Obirintin; Jagbadarigi; Jebode; Kanuko; Keere; Kipe; Km 3 (mile 2 -a Stream); Kobiti; Kogo; Kojola; Koosa Kerere; Koosa Nla; Kukudi; Kumapayi; Kurere; Lafenwa; Layeni; Leper colony; Loki; Luhami; Lukosi; Lupona; Madi; Makinde; Malomo; Mulero; Nageke; Obada; Obada Market; Obalakun; Obangeri; Odi Ori; Ogbe; Ogbodo; Ogboye; Ogongo; Ogun (Adedotun); Ogungbade; Ojangangagan; Ojibo-Alade; Ojokodo/Ijaye; Oke; Oke Ata Housing Est.; Oke Oko; Oke Pape; Oke Sokori; Olomore Housing Estate; Olomore Village; Olorogun; Olorogun Village; Olose; Olowo; Olowo Odunjo; Olowo Papa; Olubo; Oluwanfere; Oluwo Ikije; Onipako; Oniyanrin village; Onju; Ontoye; Oogidan; Ope Oluwa Village; Ori Okuta; Orun; Osho; Osieke; Osun Lafunke; Owode; Owu Olubode; Owu Tuntun; Padiku; Ponkuku; Sala Ayiinla; Salu; Sangote; Sapon; Sariki; Siga Mayero; Sodeke/Oko; Sodipe; Solosun; Surulere Area Ita; Taiwo; Telefun; Temidire off Sabo/Abule; Tolato; Totoro; Township; Yagi; Yagofijo; Yogun
Abeokuta North	Imala	110103	Abayawo; Abule Egba; Abule Oba; Abule Ojo; Abule Seriki; Adelabu; Adimo; Agba; Ajegunle; Akala; Akere; Akiegun; Akinniyi; Alagbagba; Alagbede; Alagogo; Alamola; Aleelo; Alowo Esin; Anigbado; Apasi; Apata; Apata-Oke odo; Aragba; Aragudu; Are Elebute; Arobajo; Asanusi; Aseso; Asipa; Ategbe; Atoku; Ayo; Baala; Baale; Baba Ellegun; Bamajo; Begbinlawo; Dasofunjo; Elemugbarade; Eleyoiju; Fagbenro; Falekan; Fapota; Fookusewa; Iajiye; Idera; Idi Ori; Idiata; Idiemi; Idiya; Ijaiye Orike; Ijala Orile; Ijala Papa; Ijaye Oke Odo; Ikereku; Ilala; Ileniku; Ilugun Orile; Imala Town; Inawole; Ipaya; Isaka; Iwelode; Iwofin; Iyalode; Iyalode Tibo; Jaarija; Kesan; Kesan Orile; Ketu; Kojala; Laluwe; Moloso; Mulero; Odango; Ogbaagba; Ogbon Elegba; Ogboye; Ogenne; Ogunola; Ogunte; Oje; Ojo; Ojokodo; Ojubo Lade; Ojubu Akinwande; Ojubu Latilewa; Ojugbele; Ojumo; Okooko; Oloko; Olorunda Market; Olowu; Olukosi; Omilende; Onlado; Orunto; Oyan Lawn; Remilekun; Sangowole; Tibo; Tim; Tofi; Yagi; Yawo
Ado-Odo/Otta	Ado-Odo	112103	Abule Kukoyi; Adegbite; Adigbon; Agbojedo; Agboku Agosu; Ago potefa; Aisunle; Aisunle Alaagba; Ajogbo Akia; Ajogbo Aladura; Ajogbo Ayeteju; Ajogbo Asokere; Ajogbo Bamgbose; Ajogbo Dansin; Ajogbo Jisu; Ajogbo Idi Epa; Ajogbo Seje; Ajogbo Zebbe; Akasun; Aksun Araromi; Alapoti; Aragba Arubielu; Aromokala; Asipa; Asokere; Dodo; Edu Sangoyomi; Ejigbo; Ere Oke; Eruku; Gbago; Gbekan; Gboje; Gunuko; Ibeku Papasa; Iberese; Idi Ope; Idi Orogbo; Idi ota; Idiafa; Idijigan; Idofe; Idolehin; Idopbaarun Idosaba; Ifako Ajogbedo; Ifako igbegu; Ifako Imasgai; Igbeji; Igbekan; Igbogbo; Igbojo; Igborisa; Igesu; Igounu; Ihundo; Ijako; Ijana; Ijegbe Inawole; Ijegemo; Ijomu; Ikoga bamalu; Ikogale; Ileji; Iloro; Imeiade onilogbo; Inisa; Isalu; Ishapa; Isogo; Itiri; Jagbaru; Kento; Kofelerin; Kosomi; Morekete; Oba; Obekobe; Odan ijako; Oju Iroko; Ojuroko Olorunsogo; Okanran Centre; Okanran Ifelodun; Oke Okuta Oko; Okkusu; Olokuta; Oloparun; Olorunleke; Onantan Tafin; Onilogbo; Oniniosalasi; Onlogbo; Sagbamu; Seje; Soki Ere; Tepo; Tokemi
Ado-Odo/Otta	Igbesa	112102	Aaaago; Abatabutu; Abisoye; Abule Akapo; Abule tisa; Adekoyemi; Aduloju; Agana Idi Agbon; Agana Olorunda; Agbajowo Agoro; Agbara; Agboloye; Ago Attan; Ago Egan; Ago Iboro; Ago Imuse; Ago Iso; Ago Joyi; Ago Titun; Aiku; Ajerogun; Ajibode; Agelete; Akinleye; Akinwunmi; Akoore; Aladie; Aladura; Alagbado; Alasia; Alogi; Anuoluwapo Ijolo; Araro; Arigba; Arigbawonwo; Arikewuyo; Arobi Eye; Attan; Atuko; Ayigboyi; Edu Baale; Edu Sangoyomi; Egando Ailigun; Egando Akinbo; Egando Alagba; Egudu Baale; Egudu Adesi; Egudu Agbogun; Egudu Lele; Eguntedo; Eleru; Erinlr; Ewuoe Ajasa; Ewutagbe; Fagbohun; Faluyu; Gboko Lusada; Gbongbona; Hunsa; Iboro; Idanyin Isaga; Idanyin Mosafeso; Idanyin Okepen; Idanyin Orokogodo; Idayin Petu; Idi Araba; Idi Ope; Idologbo; Idoye; Idoye Aladura; Ifelagba - Ijoko; Igabehinadun; Igbala Sango; Igbekotin; Igbele Fagbir; Igbele Tella; Igbesa; Igbo Odo; Igbo Ota; Igere; Ijako Petedo; Ijaliye Akosile; Iju; Ikogbo; Ikumapayi; Ilamiro; Ilemijan; Ilewo Alaga; Iludun Attanimose; Imuta; Imutum; Ipatira; Iperun Odubule; Irebale; Isaga; Isaga Onlado; Isaka Sango; Isanyin Baale; Isorosi Abeokuta Road; Itekun; Iyana Ilogbo; Joga Owode; Jogbo; Kajola Abanise; Ketu Adie Owe; Koko; Konifewo; Korogboji; Kuku Oluyomi; Kuoye; Liasun Baligun; Maku; Messau; Mew; Mosufejo; Obaraja; Odan Abuja; Odan Abuja Sule; Odan Agbara; Odan Odunsi; Odugie Adie Ome; Oke - Osa; Oke Ilewo; Oke Oki; Oke ore; Olanisa; Ologir; Olokopupo; Olorunda Oke Ore; Olorunlekan; Olorunsogo; Omiata; Onibisere; Onigbogbo; Onse Agbedi; Onse Olose; Onse Orita; Opaaga; Ore-Akinde; Orente Abeokuta; Oresa; Owode Centre; Owode Titun; Paramoele; Petedo; Raod Ilogbo; Sari; Temidire; Tigbolu; Titilayo; Totowu; Wasimi Ajibawo; Whedaum; Wonwo
Ado-Odo/Otta	Otta Rural	112101	Abgoju; Abiola; Aboyade; Abule Abudu; Abule Alimi; Abule Egun; Abule Fatorisa; Abule Ijana; Abule Iroko; Abule Ologege; Adalemo; Ado _odo; Afobaje; Agbajowo; Aiflodun Area; Ajambata; Ajegunle; Ajerogun; Ajuwose; Akintole; Akosile; Alagba; Alasia; Araromi; Araromi I; Araromi Ifelodun; Araromi II; Araromi Orita; Arijelowo; Arinko; Asore; Atan Otta; Ayetoro; Balogun; Egbatedo; Ejigbo Baale; Ekoledo; Elemoki; Erin; Eriwo _Ejigbo Titun; Ewupe; Fabgayi; Faluyi; Farm Settlement; Feru; G.R.A; G.R.A Extension; Gateway; Gbodojego; Idesemo; Idiagbon Agonna; Idimu; Idoleyin; Ifedagba Surulere; Ifedara; Ifesowapo; Igbawo; Igbele Tela; Igbogbo; Igi Agbode; Ignele Ajana; Iho Ifako; Ijaba; Ijako; Ijamido; Ijegemo Seto; Ijofin; Ijoko; Ijoko Titun; Iju Otta; Ilasa; Ilogbo; Iloye I; Ilugbemi; Ilupeju; Ilupeju Estate; Ilupeju iloye; Ilupeju Owoye; Ilupeju Temidire; Imupi; Ipamesan/Lereulist; Ire Akari; Irewolede; Irofoko Aparadija; Iropodun Morcas; Isie; Isimu; Isokun; Ita Mosa; Itele; Itori; Iwaya; Iwaye; Iyana Arobieye; Iyauru Titun; Iyedi Titun; Jibowi Isokan; Joju Area Sango; Kajola; Ketere; Keti Ohuyomi; Kogi; Lafenwa; Lemomu; Lesi; Liberty Etstate; Mabaodu; Madojutimi; Mopin; Ntabo; Obere; Odewale; Odun-otun; Ogo Oluwa; Ogun Gbade; Oguntedo; Oke Ola; Oke Ola Otun; Oke Suna; Olainukan; Olokunla; Olorunda; Olorunde Aguna; Olorunkemi; Olorunsogo; Olugbode; Olukoko Pupo; Olunloye Ilufun; Onifade; Onipanu; Onitoki; Ore - Ajubde; Orente; Orile Iloye; Oruba; Ose Agbedi; Osimeta; Osuya; Otun; Otunlagba; Oyede; Oyero; Oyewole; Saka; Sekoji; Sokenu; Surulere; Unity Estate
Ewekoro	Itori	112106	Abalabi; Abese; Abule Ado; Ade aga; Adopele; Adunbu Bose; Afewowa; Aga olowo; pakudi village, Agbamaya Isale; Agbamaya Oke; Agbesi; Agbon; Agodo; Aiyepe; Ajanbata; Ajegunle; Ajipatutu; Akakun; Ake; Akimbo; Akinale; Akinbiye; Akinjolo; Akinyele; Akirikan; Alawusa; Algbon; Apode Sapode; Aposu; Araromi; Arigbajo; Arogo; Asa; Asa Abule Egba; Asa obintin; Asa oke oke; Asa Olowo; Asipa; Ass Palolo; Atola; Atototan; Awade; Awu; Ayinla; Ayodere; Babalawo; Balagbe; Balogun isaga; Bayee; Egbado Ajegunle; Ejio; Elegbata; Elere Adubi; Elobuto; Eloyele; Eruka; Ewekoro; Fasola; Gudugba; Idi aga; Idiroka; Idole; Igbani awosegbe; Igbani ojo; Igbin Oloya; Ijuma Ologboni; Ika; Ikeja; Ikereku; Ikija; Ilawo; Irenpa; Isaye; Iseku; Ishopin; Isofin orile; Isola; Itori; Itori Alase; Iwokun Nia; Iyede Balogun; Jagua; Jaguna; Jaguna village; Kajola; Karieran; Kenta; Kewu; Koboro; Lafunke; Lala; Lambo; Loti; Lufedo; Mataka; Mokelu; Mosan; Mose; Mose Balogun; Obada; Ogbaga; Ogbere obanlade; Ogunsola; Ogunsola Oke; Ogunsolu; Ojo; Oke; Oke Lemo; Oke Nia; Oke Oke Egbado; Oko oko sokoni; Okun; Olapeleke; Olowo Papa; Olowo Railway station; Olu Agun; Olugbesan; Olujebi; Oluko; Olukobi; Olupe Gbelu; Oluwaji; Ona Ara; Onibotujo; Onigbedu; Onigbodu; Onikooko; Ontoye; Opeyeke; Orimoleye; Oteyi Alagbede; Oteyi Olokuta; Otunaa; Owo Railway station; Owowo village; Pade; Papa ifo; Papalanto; Pata Abiodun; Pataleri; Sango Jinmi; Sangojimi; Sapeti; Sepeti; Sideji; Siga Bayede; Siga opalola; Siwunmi; Soderu; Sojuolu; Sokan; Sologun; Sopade; Sule; Temu; Tobo; Wasimi; Wasimi Alaafia; Wasimi Elefon; Wasinmi; Yobe
Ifo	Agbado	112107	Aboro; Aboro Town; Adalemo Ope-Ilu; Adiyan; Adubaleja Ojuelegba; Agbado Railway Station; Ago Alagbede; Enilolobo; Folarin Olaore; Ibaragun; Ikuponiyi Afonta; Isaga Town; Isale; Itoki; Kongo; Obafewmi; Oke-Aro; Ope-Ilu; Oredegbe; Ota; Owonikoko; Powerline; Robiyan; Sango
Ifo	Ifo	112104	Abekoko - Ifo Town; Abeloju; Abepaki; Abudu; Abule Ogun; Adegbite; Aderenle Town; Agbegise; Agosi Estate; Akinhami; Akinside; Alapako Oke; Alapako Sogunje; Alapoti; Araromi Quqters; Asagun; Asani; Awe Akinde; Awe Alapapo; Awe-nla; Ayede; Baamu; Balogun; Bungalo - Ifo; Coker Town; Ebiti; Ekundayo; Epoto; Ibgun Oderinlo; Ibogun Akinode; Ibogun Adina; Ibogun Balogun; Ibogun Egbeda; Ibogun Fasina; Ibogun Fayolu; Ibogun Giwa; Ibogun llugboro; Ibogun Odejimi; Ibogun Odeyemi; Ibogun Olaogun; Ibogun Sowunmi; Ibogun Sunlola;Idiaga; Ifote; Igbogun; Iiepa; Inogun Olaoparun; Inogun Osugboye; Jagunna; Janbu; Kajola; Kajola Railway Station; Lerin; Oba Oseni; Obasa; Ojusango Town; Okenla; Olomu; Oloparun; Olorunsogo; Olose; Olowo; Oluomo; Omitoro Onifade; Omitoro Balogun; Onihale; Oniyamo; Opo; Orile Ifo Town; Osoba; Ososun; Pakoto; Power line; Saw-Mill; Senokan; Seriki; Sogunle; Solu; Sonde; Soyinka Alaga; Tigbo-Ogun Town
Ifo	Ojodu	112105	Ade Oni Estate; Adigboloya; Ishan-Olofin; Mowere Town; Ojodu Abiodum Town; Ojodu Abiodun Town; Wanwa; Yakoyo
Ijebu East	Fetedo	122102	Denuren; Ebuite Imobi; Fetedo; Fowoseje; Iba; Ija Gba; Ijebu Ife; Imodi; Itapampa; Itasin; Luwako; Malara; Mofowoku; Oke Mayar; Oke Tonigbo; Oki Aroromi; Oki Ggbode; Okomokun; Taliwo; Tekule; Terelu; Togunsilu; Totoruubesan; Tozsiwotoga; Tutunba
Ijebu East	Ogbere	122101	Abapawa; Ago Ajebe; Ago Alafia; Ago Ikale; Ago Isoko; Ago Oloja; Ajage; Aje Bandele; Ajepodo; Araromi Balogun; Atayo; Bolorunduro; Dopamu; Esure; Ewuren; Idono; Ifodo; Igan Arin; Igan Nla; Ilodo; Ijebu-Imushin; Ikala; Imarere; Imogun; Imuwen; Isire; Itamarun; Itamogiri; Itele; Iwaya; Kojola; Lagun; Lagunjo; Lawiwi; Lumafon; Lumugo Akande; Mafowokun; Odo Aseri; Odolameso; Odomagbo; Odometi; Oke Ogbe; Okenla; Okeyinbo; Onipetesi; Orisombare; Orita Imobi; Temidire
Ijebu East	Ojowo	122103	Ala Camp; Ebidagba; Erigun; Idofe; Igbo Mokun; Igode; Ijebu -Ife; Odoladalepo; Okeliwo; Tajala; Tedesia; Timorowo; Tirosogun
Ijebu North	Ago Iwoye	120107	Aajugunle; Aba Abekok; Aba Atala; Aba kaka; Aba Mosemi; Aba Nene; Aba Oke; Aba Panu; Aba Tedu; Aba Togungbe; Abekoko; Agbanje; Aityetutu; Aiyere; Ajalorun; Aje-Bandele; Ako Alasala; Ako Gelete; Ako Oladere; Ako Olojimbo; Ako Onigbagbo; Aladie; Alebiosu; Aledis; Alesinloye; Animasaun; Araromi; Aredi; Badaru; Dako; Dehinsilu; Ebidagba; Ehin Etiri; Elega; Elegun Mesan; Erapo; Eri Oke; Erilobi; Erin Somibare; Erubudo; Esenale; Fifipon; Idarika; Idesan; Idi Ewere; Idi Orombo; Idiomo; Igbodu Oloja; Ilemo; Imobido; Imosu -Nla; Ipakodo; Isanmuro Alelo; Isiye; Itamo; Labagidi; Laboye; Laguntan; Lasan; Latutbu; Legan Onigbagbo; Lokota Orile; Lukoti; Lumasa; Mamu; Masawun; Mobido; Mosimi; Ogunsanya; Oke Eri; Ologundudu; Olojowo; Omi Gbogbongbo; Osuu Budepo; Tako; Talagbe; Tomoloju
Ijebu North	Ijebu - Igbo	120105	Aba Afon; Aba Alaga; Aba Makoli; Aba Titun; Abaliwo; Abidepe; Abude; Afolabi; Agbowa; Agunboye; Aiyesan Agoke; Aiyesan Gboko; Aiyesna Soyemi; Ajebandele; Ajebo; Ajede Koleti; Ajegunle; Alabameta; Alakiya; Alakosu; Alasodudu; Aparaki Isale; Araromi; Araromi (R.H. S.); Araromi Balogun; Araromi Liji; Arowontaba Alimi; Balore; Balufon; Basele; Bojowa; Dagbolu; Danloro; Egan Elagbawa; Egbe; Eleiyele; Elewudu; Enigbowa; Eresun; Erilope; Erineke; Eringbala; Erinla; Erinlogun; Erinwodo; Etiale; Etikiji; Falafumu; Feoseje; Feyifitan; Fowosere; Gbedesre; Idi Oparun; Idi-Orogbo; Idiomo; Idofe; Igaran isale; Igaran Oke; Ijbu igbo; Iloren; Imaagbon; Imope; Iyaniwura; Jibowu; Kajola; Kujera; Laosi; Lapekun; Lojota; Lumogede; Moborade; Mosimi Awa; Motokan; Munira; Obisesan; Odeko; Odiolowo; Odo Alamo; Odo Osun; Ogbeluja; Ogunbela; Ogundugbo; Ogunligba; Oke Oliwo; Oke Orowa; Oke-Owa; Oligbo; Olkuwa Oke; Oloba Loke; Olokuta; Olriwo Olotun; Oni Digbolu; Onigbo- Tunije; Orimogunye; Orisunbare; Owode Awa; Pamipola; Patugi; Sebiotimo; Tagbejade; Tagidi; Takemo; Telu Bomi; Timogun; Togunberu; Tokinowo; Towotunsen; Yesufu
Ijebu North	Oru / Awaa / Ilapoaru	120106	Aba Iiepe; Aba Laiwo; Aba Merin; Abata; Abekoko; Abeku; Abobi; Adaran; Adegba; Adegorusen; Ademowo; Agbowa; Aiyesan; Ajebandele Nugba; Ajere; Ajeregun; Akinlade; Alagunatan; Alakija; Alaporu; Alasodudu; Alesin Loye; Amula; Animasaun; Apoje; Aredi; Ariye; Arowa; Arowasun; Asigidi; Awe; Awori; Baba Egbe; Badaru; Bale; Balogun; Bobale; Dinagbodo; Egan Moro; Egan Saba; Egan-Giwa; Egudugba; Egunango; Eredo; Eredo Siwonku; Eresu; Erigboro; Erikurudu; Eril Somibare; Erilamo; Eriloke; Erubodo; Etikiriji; Etitiale; Eyin-Erejun; Eyinobo; Eyioke; Gbogiri; Gbokutaru; Gboro; Ibakan Isale; Ibakan Oke; Idagbolu; Idi Ewere; Idi-Egun; Idofe; Ikan-Ide; Imosu Daniel; Ipakado; Ipeja; Isiye; Ita Erikekere; Ita-Arapa; Ita-Egba; Italiwo; Iworo; Lagan; Lajao; Lijota; Lokoti; Lugbangidi; Lugbowo; Masawun; Moborode Sanni; Mope; Mosimi; Muren; Odo-Ekerin; Odosenbora; Odosubugbawa; Odoye; Ogun Sanya; Ogundugba; Ohun; Ojobaloke; Oke- Eraye; Oke- Eri; Oke- Odo; Oke- Ogbe; Oke- Oliwo; Oke- Owa; Oke-Efon; Ologunduu; Oloje; Olojowo; Olowa; Olugba; Oluwo _Olotun; Omi Gbogbongbo; Omo Ogunarun; Omu Gbawojo; Oni Dagbolu; Osun Budepo; Owode Agbatioro; Papa Bale; Reseyin; Samore; Sigunsin; Sunbare; Tako; Talagbe; Tekubomi; Tekule Oga; Tijagun; Titlina; Todu; Togedengbe; Tologunduro; Tomoloju; Totunba; Towolo; Towonla
Ijebu North East	Atan	120102	Abarika; Agun Bode; Akitipa; Alemafo; Army Barrack; Atagure; Atata; Dela; Egan Otunba; Eganlogi; Egbenolu; Egunsen; Eri -Oburo; Eriji; Eriwu; Erofo; Eruwon; Esuru; Eti Oba; Gbawojo; Hausa Community; Ibada -Ijebu; Ibido; Ibido Okesaga; Idagunke; Idaguren; Idile; Idode; Idomila; Idomowo; Idona; Idoro; Idorunwon; Idosen; Idotun; Ifodo; Igabsa; Igbeba; Igede; Ijari; Iken; Ilefon; Ilese; Ilodu; Ilone; Iloti; Ilumerin; Ilupa; Imafon; Imagbon; Imaka; Imedu; Imewuro; Imomo; Imoro; Imuku; Imuroko; Ipabi; Ipari -Oke; Irawo; Irewon; Isade; Isaki; Isoya; Isonyin; Itamarun; Itawo; Itowo; Iwaye; Iwesi; Iworo; Iyamarun; Iyawe; Latibigun; Leoro -Musum; Lonawa; Muku; Ode Aje; Odosenlu; Odo - Aye; Odo Apejegi; Odo Asonyin; Ododeyo; Odogbolu; Odogogo; Odokalaba; Odoladenusi; Odolagaye; Odolayanra; Odole; Odolegan; Odolemere; Odolewu; Odolewunren; Odomulasa; Odopotu; Odoregbe; Odosenbora; Odosengolu; Odosenneiwa; Odosima Degun; Odosinonade; Odotu; Odusubugbowa; Ogbogbo; Ogidi; Ogojore; Oju -Ona; Oke - Ako; Oke Beku; Oke Eri; Oke Jagun; Oke Jara; Oke Kegbo -Gbun; Oke Lapenni; Oke Lejo; Oke Lewu; Oke Ola; Okelisa; Okemedu; Okemeji; Okemoyin; Oketi; Okeware; Okeyejo; Omugbawojo; Omutedo; Onirugba; Opanla; Oriwu; Orunwa; Rasonwa; Subugbawa; Tan; Tiradona; Yemoji
Ijebu Ode	Ijebu Ode	120101	Abapawa; Agbowa; Agoro; Akata; Asenba; Atakobo; Atiba; Egba; Ereji; Erigo; Erinlu; Esuru; Gbawojo; Idi Mmango; Idona; Ifido; Iganke; Igara; Igasa Odo; Igbeba; Igbogun; Igbokutu; Iillses; Ijebu -Ode; Ikangba; Ikoto; Ilone; Iloti; Imagbonlmegun; Imodi; Imosan; Imowe; Imowo; Iperin; Irawon; Isade; Isiwo; Itabu; Itamarun; Iwesi; Lapara; Latugun; Maraika; Mobalufon; Odo - Ajatun; Odo - Ladenusi; Odo -Deyo Isiwo; Odo Epo; Odo Lataye; Odo- Akata; Odoaiye; Odokobiara; Odolayanra; Odolewu; Odomolasa; Odonoko; Odosengbu Ajano; Odosenlu; Oke - Owe; Oke -Oke; Oke Eri; Oke Lifete; Okorogbin; Okemoyin; Omidudu; Omodo; Onala -Odoasonyin; Ososa
Ikenne	Irepodun	121103	Dumez Staff; Idarika; Idenna; Iditun; Ikenne; Ilishan; Iperu; Irepodun; Irolu; Ogere
Ipokia	Ifeyintedo	111104	Aferiku; Afuye; Ajegunle-Town; Ajelande; Akojapa; Akopin; Alari; Araromi; Asipa; Atan-Otta; Ayetoro; Bantepa; Idiroko; Idoforo; Idologun -Araromi; Idomogun; Ifonyintedo; Iganmi; Igbo Egun; Igbo-Atan; Igbodo; Igborddo; Igboso; Ihunbo; Iledu; Ilegbe; Ilese; Ilubo; Imule; Iropo; Ita Egbe; Ita ige; Kajola; Koko; Lukosi; Mede; Modoga; Mogbara; Ogosa; Oju-Igo; Oke Eye; Oke Iwo; Oke Ojomo; Okere; Onibgedu; Orisada-Eyo; Osooro; Osoro; Owotedo; Saaraa; Wasimi-Korodu
Ipokia	Ipokia	112101	Abojupa; Abule Baba-Kerere; Abule Iboro; Abule Idogun; Abule Olupe; Adanmaye; Adegolu; Adimarum; Afame; Afannji -Oke; Afon; Agada; Aganmaden; Aganmathen; Agbenodo; Agbogbe; Agbojedo; Agoegun; Agosasa; Aholome; Ahovo; Ajana; Ajekora; Akere; Alagangan; Alagba Gba; Alagban; Alagbomejo; Anagunji; Apata; Araromi; Araromi Onfo; Arogo; Aruwa Aboloko; Aseko; Asere; Asipa; Atapele; Atupa; Aworo; Ayedire; Bejeri; Bilafon; Bode -Ashe; Daramola; Elemo jogga; Falegbe; Fanji Whegbe; Gbadata; Gbegodo; Gbodojego; Gbonje; Ibadan; Ibetefui; Idabata; Idaoka; Idaoku; Idaro; Idetefin; Idijoriidiku; Idimarun; Idofa; Idolirosa; Idomafe; Idopetu; Idosa; Idosemo Village; Igada; Iganun; Igate; Igbao; Igbeko-Akapo; Igbekon; Igbo-Irin; Igesu; Ighodoroju; Igu; Igudafin; Igude; Igun; Igunnu; Igunu; Ijofin Town; Ilara; Ilero; Ileshi- Isale; Ileshi-Oke; Ilewe; Ilotin; Ilufe; Ilusi; Imeko; Imeri; Inuka; Inuya; Ipinle-Aga; Ipinle-Otho; Ipokia
Ipokia	Ipokia	112101	Ishaka; Isii; Isuku; Ita Agboyinu; Iwoye; Iwuka; Iwuka Gbodo; Iyesi; Izigi; Jihome; Kajola; Kate Seje; Keguta; Kobejo; Kogo; Koriwi; Kosomi; Mafor; Magunta; Matale; Maun Isale; Maun Oke; Maunseje; Modo; Moriwo; Mosifa; Obada; Obalaja-Isale; Obaningbe Oke; Obolo; Odan Ijaye; Odan Ipopo; Odofin Folashade; Ojubu-Alade; Okere; Okuta; Ologede; Oloruntedo; Onimowo; Oniro; Orisade; Osibadan-Isale; Osibadan-Oke; Owode-Idi-Ayin; Pao; Sakome; Seje; Soka; Soke Topota; Tapa; Tobolo; Togbowa; Tongeji; Tube Poye; Tube-Town; Vahe-Ajanukome; Vahwe Tafa; Vawhe -Pevi; Vawhe-Hundo; Vawhe-Tukuru; Vitapa; Whekan; Wheke; Zekanme
Obafemi Owode	Ajebo	110116	Aderupatan; Ajebo Iga Diyaolu; Ajebo Iga Durojaiye; Ajebo Iga Osaye; Ajebo Iga Sanyaolu; Ajongolo; Apena Ifote; Aragba; Asore; Ayidina; Bala Ifote; Bamigbaye; Eleruja; Fidiwo; Mosan; Nig. Youth camp.; Obe; Odekunle Abatan; Odeyemi Olugbo; Odi; Oduroye; Oluwo Ifote; Oniworo; Oseni Kehinde; Osiele; Sanya Akiloju; Soyinka Ifote
Obafemi Owode	Ajura	110114	Abata Ladile; Abiodun; Afuyeke; Agbada; Agbadu; Agbedi; Agbojulogun; Agura; Ajayi Are; Ajetutu; Alfa Jinadu; Alfa Lemomu; Ariye; Asero; Awo Lufoko; Bara; Eredo Balogun; Fere-bi Ekun; Idin ni; Igbore; Igun Elegande; Iiegbo; Iiepe; Ijaiye; Ijemo Aretu; Ijemo Kokoyi; Ijemo Oguntayo; Ikanna Balogun; Ikanna Paraga; Ikanna Seriki; Isoba; Itoku Ande; Jokuto; Kumolu; Lapoyo; Liyoku; Logbara; Oba Akinsola; Odofin Odo; Odofin Oko; Odowore; Oganla; Ogbanja Liyebi; Ogun Oridota; Oke Age; Olojo; Oluodo; Oluwo Ikanna; Orile Imo; Otunba; Ponlade; Potoki; Seriki Imo; Sinun; Siun Market; Sofolu; Sogbake; Sogbiyanju; Solo; Somore Olowotedo; Soyinka; Tiku; Wasimi Sogaolu
Obafemi Owode	Alapako Oni	110117	(Kolade); Aba Ibadan; Abujana; Adeliyi; Akidele; Akinbile; Aladura Araromi; Aladura Seriki; Alapako - Oni Iga Asipa; Alapako - Oni iga Balise; Alapako - Oni Ita Itoko; Alapaku - Oni II; Aluoge; Asaolu; Ayegunle; Balagada; Bamigbaye; Bankole Ifote; Bere Lemomu; Bereola; Bodo; Debonre; Ekendetu; Erunwon Lagba; Fadipe; Ijana Alapako; Ijeun Obadina; Imo Lisa; Iporo Akigbogun; Iporo Akonsanya; Iporo Bankole; Iporo Sopin; Itori Fasola; Jagunna Erunwon; Ladijo; Lawani Degbe; Oba Funmilayo; Oba Ogundimu; Odo Ibadan; Ogundimu; Ogunmakin; Ogunmakin Hausa Coom.; Ogunmakin Market; Oliyide; Olorunda Market; Olowo Oyerinde; Omi Ayo Itoku; Onigbodogi; Sanya Iporo; Sanya Itoku; Seriki Sotayo; Sonde Elesin; Soobu; Sora Bale; Sotayo; Sotiyo; Sowunmi; Yakoyo
Obafemi Owode	Kajola	110118	Abayomi; Aberuagba; Abiona; Abore Ikagbo; Adebayo; Adegbesan; Adekunjo; Adelokun; Adesuyi; Agbedimu; Agosu Sekeseke; Ajibayo; Ake Amode; Akiegun; Akinsola; Akinwale; Akiode; Apena Erunwon; Apena Ishan; Araba; Aro Erunwon; Aro Ituko; Baki Ake; Baleye; Baloye; Baluorogun; Base Itoku; Basina; Bayan Kemta; Dada Odamo; Foke; Gbagura Akinyemi; Gbebikan; Gbonaja; Ibunlare; Idi-Osun; Ikereku; Ikereku Ewemoja; Ikereku Sipe; Ilogbo Abore; Iraye; Isolefon; Itori Loka; Jagunna; Jibowo; Kajola Market; Kannike; Kemta Lakusodo; Kuti Ikagbo; Lemo Okunsiji; Lesin; Losi; Lufijabi; Luodo; Mayan; Momo; Mosafejo; Oba; Oba Imale; Oba Okukenu; Obayomi; Ogbe Erunwon; Ojoke; Oko Atoyinbobo; Oko Iyeru; Oko Nlado; Olibori; Olojede Asipa; Oluwo Iporo; Oojoru; Oojunibojuleru; Opeifa; Oropa Akinde; Orunmolu; Osaye; Oso Layanran; Otunbade; Oyebola; Saibu; Sakotun; Sapana; Sodunke; Sogbake; Solanke; Sowemimo; Tolu; Wasimi Oloruntedo; Woro Elepo; Woro Meroyi
Obafemi Owode	Mokoloki	110106	Aba Oke; Agbawin Obi; Agbawon Etido; Age Bankole; Aghbanowo Etitdo; Ajambata; Ajelanwa; Ajerogun; Akomologbon; Amu; Apena Ojodu; Aralu; Asasa; Asasa Olofin; Aworan Lesi; Bala Onigbongbo; Balogun Bobe; Bisodun; Ebute Ore; Eleworo; Erinla; Ewepeju; Gidimo; Ibafo; Idiroko; Igangan kilaso; Ijemo eroke; Ijere Onigbedu; Ijewo Oluwo; Ijiwo Ologboni; Ijoko Nla; Ikereku Aworan; Ikereku Onikoko; Ikija; Ikubeku; Ilate; Imedu Obadeye; Imi Lamosun; Iporo Elepo; Iro Town; Isoko; Iyedi Balogun; Jagunna Lasoju; Jagunna Sorunke; Jibode; Jiboso; Kenta Olojo; Kulu; Lajila; Lapado; Lapeji; Lukosi; Luponna; Magada Onigbagbo; Magada Onimale; Magbon Bankole; Mokoloki; Mope Olorunsogo; Mowe; Oba; Obada; Obanlado; Odofin Bankole; Odofin Oyegunle; Ojo kerere; Ojusango; Oke Oluwo; Olosan; Oluwo Soge; Osoba; Pakuro; Seriki; Soremi; Tudu; Yawota Bankole
Obafemi Owode	Mokoloki Asipa	110113	Abata; Adunbu; Afo Jagunna; Agba; Agbaege; Agbede; Aiyetoro; Ajegunle; Akaso; Akija; Akinbo; Akogun; Akoja; Apesin Magbafofo; Apidan; Ariye; Aro Ere; Aro Oba; Arowoje Iede; Asu; Bala Ereginrin; Binu; Biun; Ebiran Lube; Ebiran Sofusi; Edun Ogedegede; Ege; Erukute; Ewedina; Ibafo; Ibare; Idaganna; Idi Orogbo; Idowu Ofonren; Igbein; Ijemo Wasimi; Itan Memta; Iyanbu Rere; Kajola; Kemta Sonuti; Kemta Wasimi; Kobape; Lemode; Libegun; Lisogbe; Lugbesun; Lumoko; Maga Akilapa; Magbagbodun; Mokoloki Asipa; Obadeyi; Obaluwaji; Obateye; Ode; Odemo; Odofin; Oduroye; Ogidan Lufusi; Oke Nla; Oko; Oko Sorunke; Olowowagba; Oluwo Akibola; Oluwo Lisemo; Ososu; Ososupayi; Osu Abawongbe; Own Adelanwa; Rere Lijigun; Sobande; Soke; Solanke; Woru
Obafemi Owode	Oba	110105	A bule Panu; A dekanmbi; Abore Ijeja; Adebiopon; Adigbe; Afara; Afuyeke; Aganyan; Agbadi; Agbagba; Agbamoya; Agbamoya Oja; Agbana; Agbese; Agbon; Agboru; Agejo; Aina Afidiate; Ajaku Akogu Imo; Aje Kekere; Ajegunle Idowu; Ajegunle Oluwo; Ajiwon; Ake Konigbabe; Akete; Akinsawmki; Akolu; Akolun Akolu Nlado; Alagada; Alakoka; Apagun; Apena Igbein; Apena Ijemo; Apena Obea; Apode; Apola; Aprin; Aro; Aro Ijera; Arosun akibo; Arowa Oke; Arowa Salami; Asa; Asa-Mologede; Ashipa; Asipa Bode; Asipa Ijemo; Asoda; Awaro Olokemeji; Balogu Stoteye; Balogun; Basa Akibule; Base Akibule; Base Ijeja; Bilesami; Bowoje; Dada Lawaye; Daddy Lawani; Debari Ikoja; Deliyi; Demola; Efun Oyeodu; Egbe; Egirugi Oba; Egunda; Ekiti; Erin; Eroke; Erunb Ejilafin; Erunbe Lwani; Esimi; Ewedina; Ewusin Ladewusi; Faleye; Fasola; Gbaguru; Gbega; Gbeyanmi; Gbogbo; Gbongan; Ibon; Idiorogbo; Ifbein; Igbakunle; Igbein; Igbein II; Igbein Odetunde; Igbein Soyombo; Igbo Lobo; Igbomeku; Igbore Jagunnlawo; Igbore Somlu; Ige Idowu; Ija Nla; Ijemo Akinbola; Ijemo Wasimi; Ijeun Dipeolu; Ijeun Eya; Ijeun Odofin; Ijeun Solalu Aro; IjeunLirogbo; Ikija; Ikija Obasa; Ikkana Ajade; Ikkana Bayen; Ikkana oso; Imo Adagun; Imo Emulu; Imo Madekun; Imo Senifiran; Imo Yan; Inadan; Iporo Asalu; Iporo Odunlami; Iposo Bangudu; Iposo fasina; Irenpa Awopeju; Ita Oku Ayanjobi; Itoku Abore; Itoku Jiboso; Itoku Sukunbi; Itori Ariyibiyi; Itori Base; Itori Jejere; Itori Oke; Itori Oke Abore; Jagunna Apaki; Jagunna Dada; Jaki; Jamo; Kemo Olododo; Kerebe; Konko; Koto Akogun; Koto Bisodun; Kulewunlo; Kuluku; Kumapayi; Kusimodi; Ladoke; Lagbaja; Lajulo; Lanki; Lemo Basala; Lemo Ogundairo; Likere; Lipakala; Lisa Kemta; Lisokun; Lukanri; Lukosi; Lukosi Oderinde; Luponna Idrao; Lusokun; Maba; Magbara; Magbon; Makale; Malaka; Malaka Kujore; Malaolu; Marako; Megi; Melekuro; Molegede Odefin; Mope; Mosan; Mosunmore; Nlado Agboke; Oba; Oba Ikio; Oba Isoko; Oba Kuwoji; Oba Ladeinde; Oba Luwaji; Oba Musa; Oba Oluwa; Oba Sagobi; Oba-Kumolu; Obadeye; Obateye; Odaina; Odemo; Odo Igbein; Odofin Garuba; Odofin Ijemo; Ofada; Oganla; Ogboloko Asode; Ogunmokaolu; Oja Oba; Ojere; Oka Odofulu; Oke egan; Oke Nlado; Oke-egan; Okiri; Oko Omilado; Olobe; Oloke; Olorunsogo; Olowolagba; Oluwo; Oluwo Iboko; Oluwo Ije; Oluwo Ijeja; Oluwo Ijemo; Oluwo Iraye; Oluwo Sodeke; Onidundun; Onikoko; Onipepeye; Opalo; Oregbe; Orokuta; Oruntu Dalemo; Osiki; Oso akore; Osu; Ototo Lukoye; Otun Kemta; Otunbadu; Oyemeji Ogbe; Oyero; Pasi; Rogowu Itoku; Safu; Saki; Sidipon oru; Sobo; Sobomde; Sodeke; Sodemi; Soderu; Sodubi; Sofuyi; Sogbanmu; Solake; Solo; Somolu Ijeun; Somolu Isoko; Sorungbe; Sosanya; Sotade; Soto; Sotoyi; Toloko; Tolu; Tonawo
Obafemi Owode	Obafemi	110107	Obafemi Market; Odedina; Odedola; Odi; Odo Dipeolu; odo Ijesha; Odo Nla; Odo Sonde; Ogungbade; Ogunkanbi; Ogunkandi Saguntan; Ogunkayode; Ogunmakin Orile; Ogunsan Fadiro; Ogunseye; Ogunwolu; Ojebiyi; Ojoki Sobowale; Oka; Oke; Oke Iporo; Okolomo; Okukenu; Olobi; Olofin; Oloparun; Olorunde; Oloye; Olude; Oluwo Erunbe; Oluwo Esanowo; Onigbori; Onle -oke; Ori; Orisaye; Osin Toko; Osiun; Oso Ogunloko; Osu Liyele; Ota; Owojo; Owolabi; Pagura-gbagura; Pempe; Sagalu; Sango Tolu; Sanmi Sobo; Sapala; Sapala Makinde; Sarumi Diro; Seriki Okusanjo; Sewunju; Shodunke; Siluade; Sobande; Sobiye; Sodaolu; Sodolu; Sogbake II; Sokanlu; Sorin; Sotan ijemo; Sotiyo; Sotomi; Sowemimo; Tejuoso; Took Ogunboyejo; Yesolu Gbasemo; Yinagi; Zion Okegbala
Obafemi Owode	Ofada	110115	Abaren; Abata sobulo; Abatan; Abore; Abule Oba; Abule Oko; Abule Ori; Adaje Larinlo; Adebesin; Adebopon; Adegbokan; Aderugboko; Adesan.; Adigboluja; Agbo; Agbogunlere; Agboro; Agewe; Agodo; Agunje; Aiyedi; Ajala; Ajala Sokunbi; Ajana; Ajana Ikereku; Ajibayo; Akibo Agbin; Akingbade; Akogun; Akoko Knoshi; Akoyogun; Akun; Alaba; Alagbade; Alayin; Alayin II; Alebiosu; Aleku; Alli Seriki; Alufa; Amida; Amusan Osogberin; Amusan Soremekun; Apaipai; Apena Ake; Apena Erunbe; Apena Ijeun; Apena Oderinde; Araromi; Are Ago; Arigbowonwo; Aro Oba; Asalu Efujo; Asaya agewe; Asaya bala; Asaya Elegada; Asaya Elegun; Asaya Lokoji; Asaya Sodeke; Asegunle; Asero; Asese; Asimoloowo; Asore Soyoye; Atapepe; Ategun; Awakana; Awodun Ekun; Awowo; Awowo Bakare; Awowo Depoda; Baala; Bakere; Baki Alamo; Bale Maanolu; Balogun Erunbe; Balole; Bamagbade; Bamgbade; Bamukola; Bamukole; Baromu; Base Iporo; Basuru; Bisodum; Bodo Lisemi; Boodo; Dagunja; Daluwon; Degbaolu; Degesin; Ebinpejo; Ebut Osese; Egun; Erinle; Eruku; Erunbe Asogboni; Erunwon; Erunwon Oridota; Ewetedo; Fadipe Aragbagba; Fadipe Soyoye; Fati; Fatoyinbo; Fidiwo; Fidiwo Market; Fodoko; Fowowawo; Gbagura; Gbenle Odu; Gboro; Gbure; Ibafo; Ibasa; Idaba; Igbedu; Igbin; Ige; Igu Landu; Ijemo Aiyejoun; Ijemo Ajagbe; Ijemo Shotan; Ijemo Sobujo; Ijemosotan; Ijere Aglete; Ijere Akiyegun; Ijere worukudu; Ijoko; Ikeredo Oluwo Ijoko; Imedu Bage; Imedu Oke Ipa; Imedu Olori; Ipare Akinsanya; Iraye; Iriro; Isoleku; Itoko; Itoko Solabomi; Itori Esuruoso; Iyanbu; Jagona; Jaow; Jawun; Jibesin; Jiboku Molere; Jinadu Saguwa; Kajola; Kannakanna; Kara Aragbada; Kara Ewumi; Kemta Luponna; Kori Eluku; Kori Isa; Kufile; Kurogbe; Kuti; Kuti Iloda; Ladijo; Lagidi Ojo; Lakehinde; Landu; Latunde; Lisa Erunbe; Liso/Alapandi; Loburo; Lojede; Lowa Oke; Maba; Mabon; Magada Amusan; Magada Ototi; Magbon; Magboro; Magboro Akeran; Makogi; Malaolu; Manworo; Mosadomi; Mosafejo; Mosafejo Oni; Mosan; Mowe; Oba Okio; Obadeyi; Obafemi; Ofada; Oganla; Ogunrombi; Ogunrore; Ogunrun Eletu; Oju Ora; Okepa; Omu Sorin; Omu folakan; Omu Aleku; Omu Arogun; Omu Jibode; Omu Osoko; Omu Pampe; Ori Soyede; Orimerunmu; Pakuro; Salemo; Sefu elelede; Sefu Ota; Sefusote; Totoro
Obafemi Owode	Ogunmakin	110108	Ago Ilorin; Agoro; Aiyegunle; Ajanbata; Akeju; Alapako Oni; Alufogejo; Asedo; Atoku; Demolapa; Ebute Ore; Erin Nla; Ijoko - Ijalemo; Imo Apena; Imolisa; Jaguna; Labosi Otun; Lagngan; Mobolawole; Mope; Oba Ajana; Ogunbora; Ogunmakin; Oluwosoye
Obafemi Owode	Onidundu	110112	Adebayo; Afojupa Igbore; Afojupa Kekere; Afojupa Nla; Ajade Oluye; Ajana; Ajana Liyebi; Ajana Oke; Ajerogun; Akankan; Akeju; Akisan; Akiyegun; Asagbe; Ate Lempe; Ate Libere; Balogun Bobe; Balogun Sote; Boto; Daddy; Eguru; Eleiyile Adebiyi; Elepo; Eriki Awoke; ErikiOdofin; Igbo Oya; Ijemo Aganna; Ijemo Olusi; Ijemo Soetan; Ijemo Yaro; Ijemota Gogoro; Ijoko Kekere; Isa Itori; Isoko; Iyanu Itori; Jiboku; Kemta Kilaso; Laloko; Mosafejo; Obanlado; Ogun; Ogunbebe; Ogunbona; Oko Oko; Olugbo; Onidundu; Oniwawa; Orogbo; Oruntu; Ososapon; Otanki; Otunba; Ropo; Sodeke; Soji; Soseri; Sowunmi; Tapala
Obafemi Owode	Owode	110104	Abata Ogunla; Abule Ijade; Adegunle; Adeiga; Agbaakin; Aiyetoro Oyetola; Ajasu; Ajura; Akaso; Akija; Akinlegun; Apera Isan; Are Village; Asalu; Asanwole; Asubojo; Balufe; Bara bagbimo; Doga; Edun Onlogbo; Elere; Erifu; Erofo; Erukulesi; Erunbe; Gbarawe; Gbodo; Geledun; Geleodun; Ibokun Olege; Ibokun Oro; Igbo Oya; Igbore Araferin; Ijemo Kukoyi; Ikanna; Ikereku; Ikoyi Ijemo; Imo Isasa; Itori Jekayinfa; Jagunna Lasoju; Jibowu; Kajola; Kaloko; Kangibe; Keke; Kenke; Kori Gbarago; Koselu; Lanlemo; Lapala; Lapoyo; Lasogba; Leke; Lugboko; Lukosi Igbein; Maja Afolu; Melegun; Mosarejo; Oba Oluwo; Odedeyi; Ofesepe; Ogbe Odujoko; Ogunrombi; Oguseye; Ogutayo; Okolomo; Olajo Oke; Olojaoke; Olori; Olorombo; Olorunsogo; Olowotedo; Oluwo; Omu Atere; Omu Ayoyinde; Omu Base; Omu Onikoko; Onikoko; Ori-Igbein; Orisuvmibare; Otere Oba; Otere Apena; Otere Luwoye; Otere Peki; Otete; Owode; Potoki; S ogoye; S omeke; Shinwuun; Sobo; Sode; Wajawaja; Wasimi
Odeda	Aigbagba	110123	Abakuyamo; Akia; Alagbagba; Amini Awo; Araromi; Baba- Pupa; Balogun - Ilawo; Elegunmefa; Ijemo -Fadipe; Ikija; Itesi Lijigun; Itoku; Lersin - Olorode; Ntoji; Odebo; Ogundipe; Ojebiyi; Ola; Owu
Odeda	Alabata	110124	Abidogun; Adao; Agurodo; Ajilete; Alabata; Baka; Balekan; Court; Egbeda; Erinle; Fagbohun; Famii; Imala; Oba; Odunbaku; omitogun; Oota; Seriki; Tejoun
Odeda	Ilugun	110111	Adedapo; Adewusi; Ajagbe; Ajobo; Akonko; Alaghaa; Daodu; Efon; Fadipe; Ilugun; Kila; Kugba; Ladipo; Oguntolu; Okiriojule; Olofin; Olokemeji; Olokun; Olowo; Onireke; Oniyanrin; Yisa
Odeda	Itesi	110120	Aderupoko; Aganrere; Anifamu; Apena Kemta; Araomi; Awowo; Balogun; bantun; Edila; Emulu; Ese Oke; Iyanbu; Kebo; Keere; Lalemi; Ntoji; Odelaitan; Ogunda; Olori; Papa - Oja; Segile; Yakoyo
Odeda	Obantoko	110121	Aaya; Akingbade; Anigilaje; Apena; Aregbesola; Eleweran; Ijebu; Iligun; Ilupapu - Alagbede; Iyanbu; Kangudu; Lakiri; Legua; Leso; Morekete; Obaasa; Obantoko; Olubo; Sobeyi; Tirinmi
Odeda	Obete	110125	Adebori; Ajuba; Apojola; Arikola; Ariwo; Asipa; Ayoyo; Bonuola; Idi Emi; Ihokoko; Ijape; Luhani; Obete; Odo - Erin; Ogunmola; Okedi; Orile Abaaka; Oyan Dam; Sikiru
Odeda	Odeda	110109	Agboke; Akogun; Alayin; Anipupo; Arege; Eweje; Idi -Obi; Ilagbe; Ile - Olu; Itoko Elemide; Lugbose; Makuleri; Oboskoto; Odeda; Ogboye; Ogeleje; Ogunbayo; Oluga; Olugbo; Rogun Rogun; Sokan
Odeda	Olodo	110122	Agbe; Baagbon; Bangboye; Ego; Fagbemi; Ikija; Ipora Oga; Kereku; Kesinro; Ladojo; Loosi; Obo_ogunsola; Oju -Ogun; Olodo; Olori; Oluwa Kessi; Otere Ogunkola
Odeda	Opeji	110110	Adako; Adebori; Ajaro; Amoje; Asipa; Fadage; Gbotikale; Idi Emi; Ijo Agbe; Ilawo; Isope; Kajola; Lemo; Mawuko; Obe; Olajogun; Onigbogbo; Oniyanrin; Opeji; arimi-esin ajayi;iyalode tinubu; ojokodo
Odeda	Osiele	110119	Ajan; Alabata Solotan; Apakila; Apena; Are; Atepa; Camp; Egunre; Idera; Idi Aka; Iporo Pooopla; Isolu; Itoko Ajegunle; Iwo Ali; Jagun Akinfenwa; Odogba; Ogboja; Osiele; Owe; Tesi Ajegunle
Odogbolu	Alekunifesowapo	120104	Adofe; Aiyepe; Araromi; Eyinwa; Ijesa Ijebu; Isaye; Itamerin; Moloko; Odogbolu; Ogoji; Ogudu; Okunowa; Omju Warun; Owoyade
Odogbolu	Leguru	120103	Ababa; Abapawa; Abatiwa; Adofe; Agoro; Aiyepe; Akio; Ala; Ebute Odo; Egb-Imosu; Egbe; Emuren; Erinlu; Eriwe; Eyinwa; Ibefun; Ibido; Ibido Omu; Idido Ogbo; Idiru; Idotun; Idowa; Iganke; Igbile; Igbomowo; Ijagun; Ijele; Ijesa -Ijebu; Ikangba; Ikise; Ikoto; Ikoto -Ogbo; Ilado; Ilado ogbo; Ilawe Ogbo; Imagbon; Imaka; Imaweje; Imodi ijasi; Imodi Ijebu; Imoro; Imoru; Imosan; Iperin; Irete; Isanyin ogbo; Ita - Epo; Itanrin; Ite Merin; Jobore; Larowo Ogbo; Latotun; Maraika; Moloko; Odo Agameji; Odo Alumapebi; Odo Epo; Odo Oba; Odo Sikanwa; Odoja; Odoragba; Odosenlu; Ogbo; Oke Lamuren; Oke Orundun; Omu; Ososa; Shibadewa
Ogun Waterside	Abigi	122104	Abigi; Agbede; Agbure; Agerige; Agilla; Agodo; Aiyede; Aiyesan; Ajegunle; Apata; Araromi Odo; Araromi Oke; Arokola; Ayetunmara; Bolorun Duro; Efire; Gbagi Market; Ibide; Ibu; Igbafo; Ijebu; Ilusin; Isekun; Ita Ogun; Ita Out; Itabaiye Itatufolu; Italugade; Itebu; Kesumeta; Leren; Logbosere; Logede; Lokula; Lomiro; Lukugbe; Makun; Moba; Oka; Okakota; Ologbu; Oruiye; Ranger; Sunbare; Tagbu Nrin; Tayoku; Tibada; Tigara; Tilagbe; Toga; Togunren; Toso; Urhobo; Yemoje; Zion
Ogun Waterside	Ijebu Manuwa	122107	Ajegunle; Araromi; Araromi Obu; Arijan; Ayede; Ayila; Batedo; Edunola Igodankuda; Gbaragada Ibu; Idobilayo; Igbo Ala; Ijako; Ijebu Manuwa; Ipakemore; Iteju Elero; Lofoluwa; Logbosere; Momiro; More; Okebi
Ogun Waterside	Iwopin	122106	Ajelanwa; Alo; Demolu; Ebute Oni; Idata Akila; Igele; Imeki; Itomosafeso; Iwopin; Lumuganran; Molofe; Molopope; Ologbun Orita Omo; Olojumeta; Oni Shalu; Oribu; Oriegbe; Oriyanrin; Sumoge
Ogun Waterside	Ode Omi	122105	Aba J.K; Aba Olori; Abusoro; Agbala Irokun; Ago Ariye; Ajimo; Akede II; Awodikora Iganla; Awodikora Osa; Awodikora Seafu; Eba Igboedu; Ebute Okun; Ibodu; Igbo Edun; Irokun; Ito Aro; Itomowa-I Tolabase; Liyewu; Makun Omi; Mofere; Moha; Mosefejo; Obimilehin; Ode Omi; Okun Akede; Okun Awodikora; Okun Elufon; Okun Igbosere; Okun Ilete; Olokun Olosumeta
Remo North	Isala	121104	Aba James; Adegbolu; Adeyoruna; Afofu; Agbala; Aja Gba; Ajade; Ajana; Ajanaku; Ajayi; Ajayi Egba; Ajegunle; Akabiti; Akaka; Akofa; Alafoh; Alamure; Alara; Alebiosu; Alegbo; Aro; Arukuyan; Asanre; Asiru; Asonre; Atoba; Bada; Baiyede; Balogun; Bamigbopa; Banmu; Bata; Dawara; Eboda; Ebugan; Egua; Egundebi; Egunfoye; Ekuku; Eleruja; Eluju; Ewo; Fayemi; Gbasemo; Gbolujo; Gboyegsa; Giwa; Gomina; Idi Osan; Igbore Ajanaku; Ige; Ilara; Imagbo; Imo; Ipara; Iraye; Iresi; Isan _Araromi; Isara; Itakete; Itoku Oloruntedo; Iya Orisa; Jagun; John-Egbedele; Jowoje; Jowoje -Nla; Kajola; Kayero; Koko; Kokoro; Kura; Ladunke; Lagbana; Lapeni; Layungbo; Lere; Lokuta; Lokuta Nla; Loluta; Mope; Oba; Ode Remo; Odo Nla; Odofin; Ogedengbe; Ogunbi; Ogunbodo; Ogunleye; Ogunmuyiwa; Ogunsina; Ogunti; Ojikoredun; Oke - Delokun; Oke Eri; Ologuro; Oloro; Oluwo; Ori Egaun; Ori Eta; Orile Oke; Ososile; Otete; Oyedele; Peteku - Awowo; Peteku Sokabi; Petekun Darawa; Piti; Sapade; Sasawo; Shofidipe; Silalu; Singuru; Sisalu; Sisawo; Sobowale -Oba; Sodipe; Sodipe II; Sofidipe; Sofolabo; Soka; Sokabi; Sokita; Sontere; Sore; Sotayo; Sotobi; Sotunbe; Tesi
Sagamu	Ode Lemo	121102	Ajeregn; Ewo Oliwo; Ewu -Lemo; Ewu Dihomey; Gbaga; Gunsemade; Lemo; Ode -Lemo
Sagamu	Sagamu (Rural)	121101	Aberebi; Agabala; Agbagbonyin; Agbere Sowo; Agbonmagbe; Agbowo; Agbowu; Aguntoye; Aiyetoro; Ajebandele; Ajebo; Ajegunle; Ajeregun; Ajiyan; Akarigbo; Alagbe; Alase Araromi; Alupape; Amiteku; Apara; Apele Suberu; Araromi; Arigbabu; Arobo; Aroyi Ajegunle; Asipa; Balugun; Dakole; Dodfin; Ebinpejo; Edina; Elepetu; Emure; Ereku; Erin Igbo; Erinle; Eriyo Ga; Ewa Oluwa; Ewa Solaja; Ewu Ajeinfunja; Ewu Ena; Ewu Ode; Ewu Ogun; Ewu Oloja; Ewu Olopo; Eyin Odan; Eyita; Fajege; Fakale; Gbadamo; Gbaga; Gbara; Gbasepo; Gbomo; Ibelefun; Iboriade; Igbafa; Igbogbo; Igboke; Igbololo; Igbosoro; Igode; Ijagun; Ijemo; Ijoko; Ijokun; Ilara; Ilesun; Imagbon; Imogun; Imoro; Imusin; Imute; Ipa; Iraye; Isaga; Ita Arogun; Ita Sanni; Itailein; Itamerin; Iwelepe; Jabulu; Kanuyi; Kayoju; Kereru; Koe-imaso; Kojola; Kujore; Ladegbuwa; Ladesura; Ladi; Latoro; Lenuwa; Likosi; Lisa; Losi; Loyo; Makun; Mayungbo; Mede; Memigba; Molakori; Molatu; Moro; Mosimi; Negbuwa; Ode Kesiro; Odogboro; Odojobe; Odu Gboro; Oduyamo; Ogijo; Ogundipe; Ogunlogun; Ogunmogbo; Ok Esalu; Oke Agbala; Oke Ariko; Oke Ate Fumuyiwa; Oke-Odo; Okelupa; Okerala Apena; Okerere Itamerin; Oko Oba; Oko Ojugbo; Okoe Imaso; Okoto Ajegunle; Ologbun; Olojaolokiti; Olowojobi; Onimale; Onisope; Ori Okuta; Orile Ado; Orita Atoyo; Orita odo; Osile; Oso; Osopo; Ososo; Ota; Otuyelu; Out - Bakoga; Oyegbami; Oyeleke; Pofuwa; Radelu; Ranadu; Rasupi; Ritamerin; Rofo Agbele; Simawa; Sogbadun; Somisire; Soso; Sotubo; Sowo
Yewa North	Ayetoro	111105	Ajo; Abukle Agberiode; Abule Alaga; Abule Adeyemi; Abule Agbede; Abule Agbowogbo; Abule Bolarinwa; Abule Iko; Abule Obe; Abule Oga; Abule Oke Odo; Abule Olude; Abulke Alagba; Adedira; Adegba; Adekajyb Church; Agboro Isanah; Agboro Saagi; Agbowo; Ahan Village; Ajayi; Ajegunle; Ajibola Idigba; Akimale; Akinfenwa; Akintayo Iliemo; Aladin; Alaga; Allagbaa; Apata Atemola; Ape Sin _Aibo; Asate; Asipa; Atan - Ajanaku; Atan - Atemole; Atokun; Babafa; Babalasa; Bamajo Arewu; Disu; Edun Ejire; Elebutu; Elega; Elemo; Elewuran; Erinpa Apensa; Idi Aparan; Idi Ata; Idi Odan; Idigba Faremi; Idiigba; Igbori; Ijan Okoto; Ijaye; Ikoo Village; Isa Ope; Isa-Ogun Apapa; Isanta; Jagbadarigi; Jagode; Ketu; Kobejo; Kudaju Alagberekan; Obiri; Odanle; Odunfa; Ogunseye; Ojo; Oke Akanni; Oke Akanno; Okundun; Olobi; Ologbogbo; Oloke - Ile; Olowonyo; Omiragoro; Onibeji; Opete; Owuwu; Popoola; Saaka Orile; Sakere; Soleye; Sunwa; Tunnda; Yewa; Yewa Drisu
Yewa North	Igbogila	111108	Abule Ajama; Abule Balogun; Abule Egba; Abule Ijesha; Abule Imasai; Abule Oke; Aga Odofin; Aje Rogun; Ajibawo; Alaganju; Aramrori; Araromi Abiodun; Araromi Ilewo; Bad Elefu; Balogun; Egba Ilewo; Egba Isaga Orita; Eleeyo; Farm Settlement; Ibese; Iboro; Igbgila farm; Igboeleke; Igbogila; Iiewe; Ijake Orile; Ijako Awaye; Ijiko; Isaga Abiodun; Isaga Oke; Isaga Orita; Jogga Orile; Komi Oba; Kudifi; Oke Odo; Omilende; Orente; Orita; Owode; Owoyele; Sawonjo; Settlement Wasimi; Swonjo; Wasinmi Imasayi
Yewa North	Oja-Odan	111109	Abe Isin; Abon Orile; Abuke Idi; Abule Aga; Abule Isu; Abule Lesse; Abule Mulere; Abule Okele; Abule Zachraus; Adeisin; Afo - Nkaa; Agbele; Agbo Ogede; Agbon Ojodu; Agbontedo; Ageru; Ajelende; Ajengula ibayin; Akeru Abeobi; Aleru Ajiboye; Apate; Asa; Awe; Baba Kekere; Bambola; Ebute -Igboro; Egbeda; Gbogoru; Gbokoto; Gotoko Isale; Hauga; Ibayin; Ibeku; Igbeme Alabe; Igbeme olude; Igbo Ogebe; Igbo Orile; Igbon; Igbooro Oke; Igho Timber Camp; Ihumbe; Ijege; Ijoko Ase; Ijoko Isale; Ijoko Oke; Ijoko Orile; Ile Alabe; Ile Igboro; Ileme; Ilepa; Iselu Orile; Isuku; Isun; Ita Kasia; Iyalode; Iyana Meta; Kobejo; Kobejo Abikanlu; Kobejo Aladura; Kodere; Korole; Kusade; Lanloku; Mere; Moro; Mosan; Obele; Ogbe; Oja - Odan; Ojugbele; Ojumo; Oke-Odo; Okoso; Ologiri; Oloparun; Olosun; Opata; Orebiyi; Owode Balogun; Papa Olosun; Pedepo; Refurefu; Seke; Yewa Mota
Yewa North	Tata	111106	Abule ketu; Adekan; Agbogbo; Akapo; Aruku; Asaga; Atan Efon; Aworo Pedepo; Ayerinde; Dangi-dangi; Eeja Orile; Egba; Eggua; Falade; Ibisi Idigbo; Ibiyan; Ibore Oke Ode; Idan Iga; Idi-Ori; Idigbo; Igan-Alade; Igbimu; Igbo-Aje; Igbo-Iju; Igbo-Nla; Igbokofi; Igboofa; Ijaka Isale; Ijaka Oke; Ijale-Ketu; Ijeun; Ika Orile; Imaa; Imoto Orile; Imoto Yewa; Isa Ogun; Iseiyoun; Iwale; Iyana-Agbere; Lasilo; Llodo; Modeyo; Mokoya; Ogunba Aiyetoro; Oke; Oke-Eyo; Okeola; Onilogbo; Orile Ijonu; Orisade; Owode-Ketu; Sagbon; Sagisa; Sowere; Tata; Tobolo
Yewa South	Ifeko Wajo	111102	Abu; Abule Abu; Abule Ademola; Abule Ajayi Odi; Abule Akegbo; Abule Debo; Abule Fadayiro; Abule Kesehin; Abule Monija; Abule Oke; Abule Oladele; Abule Paki; Abule Teacher; Ago Iilobi; Agosu; Agude; Ajayi Oti; Ajegunle; Ajilete; Ajimagbodo; Ajise; Ajolojo; Alabba; Alagbade; Alagbede Eredo; Alaparun; Alaparun Oke Odo; Alaraba; Apala; Apara; Araromi; Asipa; Awukoketu; Ayomaya; Cement; Egunjobi; Elegbede; Eredo; Erimi; Erinja; Eykarise; Fadairo; Farawole; Fatedo; Gereta; Ibio; Ibure Ogun; Idiku; Idohude; Idologun; Igboho -Tedo; Igborodo; Ihunbo; Iilesha; Ijako; Ikorodu Wasimi; Isagbo -oke; Isagbo ere; Ita igbe; Jobi; Kajola; Kampu; Makusota; Odan ijoko; Odunewu; Offa; Oja erin; Oja-ota; Oju Epo; Ojumo adodo; Oke erinja; Oke Odan; Okerinja; Oko Baba; Oko-Eiye; Okobaba; Olowologba; Onigbedu; Onijam; Onirike; Orisada; Owede; Owo; Owode-Egbado; Petedo; Saabe; Sabo; Yakata
Yewa South	Ilaro (Rural)	111101	Abule Iyalode; Abule Sondiro I; Abule Olopa; Abule Olope; Abule Olusoji; Abule Sondiro II; Adewale; Agbada; Agbomola; Ajibabi; Akamu; Akinde; Akinlade; Akiti; Aladie; Alagbado; Alagbe; Alarabe; Alugangan; Apakoso; Araromi Ifelodun; Araromi Yesufu; Arogun Ategbe; Asafo village; Asipa; Atoyo; Atoyo I; Atoyo II; Booda; Damolapa; Egbo Oloparun; Elemere; Eleyale Dada; Eleyele; Erinmi; Erinmi Oguntade; Etute Adewale; Fagbohun; Feyisitan; Gbogo; Gbokoto; Gbokoto ijanna; Idi Isin; Idi Mangoro; Idi Obi; Idi Osan; Idi Osun; Idogo; Idola; Idologun; Idolude; Ieoye; Iganmu Isale; Iganmu Olosa; Igbeji; Igbeme; Igbintedo; Ijado; Ijanna; Ijegun; Ijoke; Ilaro; Ilobi Onuwa; Imeke; Imoro; Ipaja Town; Ipake; Irogun Olatunji; Irogun Adebo; Irogun Akere; Irogun Olurunde; Isaga - Olutunji; Ita Baba Monday; Itolu; Itoro Town; Iweke; Iwogia; Jaja; Jeburu; Kajola Palaki; Kakanfo; Koto -Obo; Kudoro; Kudu; Odan Apadi; Oguntedo; Ojete; Ojetedo; Oke Iganmu; Oke-Ayo; Ologorin; Olokuta; Oloparun Fadare; Olorunlekan; Olorunsogo; Olose; Oluiye; Oluta; Olute; Omilende; Omolere; Onitubu; Oniyaha; Orile Itoro; Sarunmi; Sobola; Yewe matta

== By electoral ward ==
Below is a list of polling units, including villages and schools, organised by electoral ward.

LGA	Ward	Polling Unit Name
Abeokuta North	Ikereku	O. U. S Pry. School Ikereku I; O. U. S Pry. School Ikereku II; Near Holy Trinity Church I; Near Holy Trinity Church II; Near Ita Ogboni Idomapa I; Near Ita Ogboni Idomapa II; Ojude Agburin; Near Aroworehin Mosque II; Near Oke Eri Mosque; Near Lasode House I; Near Lasode House II; Open Space Close To The Ajanaku's
Abeokuta North	Ikija	Nud Ikija I; Nud Ikija II; Holy Prophet Isale Ogun I; Holy Prophet Isale Ogun II; Ahmadiya Pry. School; Open Space At Osunrinde's House I
Abeokuta North	Ago Oko	Space At Itamorin I; Space At Itamorin II; Space At Kinoshi House I; Space At Kinoshi House II; Muslim Pry. School Ago-Oko I; Muslim Pry. School Ago-Oko II; Muslim Pry. School Ago-Oko III; Ita Balogun Mosque I; Ita Balogun Mosque II; Ita Balogun Mosque III; Araromi Mosque
Abeokuta North	Elega	Muslim Pry. School Elega I; Muslim Pry. School Elega II; Muslim Pry. School Elega III; Muslim Pry. School Elega IV; Ilugun High School I; Ilugun High School II; Ilugun High School III; Space At Leper Colony I; Space At Leper Colony II; Opeloyeru Mosque Imala
Abeokuta North	Ilugun/Iberekodo	Anlg School Ilugun Asalu I; Anlg School Ilugun Asalu II; Anlg School Ilugun Asalu III; Near Gbemisola's House I; Near Gbemisola's House II; Ile Eja I; Ile Eja II; Isotakun Mosque, Iberekodo; Booth Opp. The Isola's (Close To Ejialamala); Near Chief Tairu's House I; Near Chief Tairu's House II; Ayo Bus Stop Along Oke-Ona Road; O. U. S. School Ikija I; O. U. S. School Ikija II; Anlg School Akomoje I; Anlg School Akomoje II; Ebenezer Grammar School; Front Of Atambala's House; Maternity Centre, Iberekodo
Abeokuta North	Gbagura	Space At Customary Court Agura I; Space At Customary Court Agura II; A. U. D. Kemta Ilawo I; A. U. D. Kemta Ilawo II; Near Asunara Mosque I; Near Asunara Mosque II; Space At Oju Odumaka; Near Isale Ago Mosque; Holy Trinity Ojesimi; Open Space Near Bobagunwa's House; Open Space Near Agura Palace
Abeokuta North	Ika	Near Old Slaughter's Slab I; Apata Mosque Ijaye Obirinti; Unity High School Ago-Ika I; Unity High School Ago-Ika II; Space At Ago-Ika Junction I; Space At Ago-Ika Junction II; Near Ita Nla Mosque/Jaye Kukudi I; Near Ita Nla Mosque/Jaye Kukudi II; Near Refuse Deport Ago-Ika; Alasalatu Pry. School; Opposite Odole's Comp
Abeokuta North	Lafenwa	St. John's School Lafenwa I; St. John's School Lafenwa II; Apostolic Church Afunta I; Apostolic Church Afunta II; Near Yusufu's House I; Near Yusufu's House II; Front Of Alh. Adegbenro's House; Near Baale's House I; Near Baale's House II
Abeokuta North	Oke-Ago Owu	Anlg School Ago-Owu I; Anlg School Ago-Owu II; Olowu's Palace I; Olowu's Palace II; Near Agbogunleri's Mosque; Jeboda's Mosque; Amukankan I; Amukankan II; Open Space Opp. Ogunsebi Erepaja's House; Opp. Space Opp. Orukan's Compound; Opp. Space Behind Egbeyemi's House; Olufakun Compound (Open Space); Open Space At Lara's Compound; Jeboda's Court II; Front Of Akintobi's House
Abeokuta North	Totoro/Sokori	Totoro Post Office I; Totoro Post Office II; Totoro Post Office III; Owu Baptist Church; Front Of African Church/Ta-Olori I; Front Of African Church/Ta-Olori II; Front Of African Church/Ta-Olori III; A. L. G. Maternity Totoro I; A. L. G. Maternity Totoro II; Sokori Market Square I; Sokori Market Square II; African Church Central Pri Sch Ita Iyalode; Methodist Pry. School Sokori I; Oke-Sokori Mosque; Asasin's Compound I; Asasin's Compound II; Olokun's Compound; Space At Oriyanrin I; Space At Oriyanrin II; A. L. G. Ebu Alaparo; Olosi's Compound I; Olosomi's Compound; Bus Stop At Pepsi; A. L. G. Ebu Ala Paro; Gateway Secondary School I; Gateway Secondary School II; Akinolugbade Social Centre
Abeokuta North	Ita-Oshin/Olomore	Olomore Housing Estate I; Olomore Housing Estate II; Olomore Housing Estate III; Near Fresh Fish Market I; Near Fresh Fish Market II; E. A. C. /Ta Oshin I; E. A. C. /Ta Oshin II; E. A. C. /Ta Oshin III; Olosun Village; Psychiatric Hospital I; Psychiatric Hospital II; Surulere Olomore
Abeokuta North	Olorunda Ijale	A. U. D. Ijale Papa I; A. U. D. Ijale Papa II; Anlg Pry Sch, Ijole Orile; Seriki Village; Baptist Pry. School Tibo I; Baptist Pry. School Tibo II; Maternity Centre, Olorunda; Baptist School Olorunda II; A. L. G. Begbinlawo I; A. L. G. Begbinlawo II; Ilogun Orile Village; A. N. G. Idi-Ori; R. C. M. Keesan Orile I; R. C. M. Keesan Orile II; A. N. G. Akiliyi; Akiegun Junction; A. L. G. School Fapote
Abeokuta North	Imala - Idiemi	A. L. G. School Imala I; A. L. G. School Imala II; A. L. G. School Imala III; A. L. G. School Imala IV; A. L. G. School Imala V; Oyan Farm Settlement I; Oyan Farm Settlement II; F. S. P Idi-Emi I; F. S. P Idi-Emi II; F. S. P Idi-Emi III; F. S. P Idi-Emi IV; A. L. G. Anigbado; St. Mathew Idi-Emi I; St. Mathew Idi-Emi II; St. Mathew Idi-Emi III; Anlg Sch, Olodo; A. N. G. Akapa I; Anlg Pry Sch, Molomo; Ipaya Akintunde; A. N. L. G. School Olukosi; St. Patrick Ileniku; Obalakun I; Obalakun II
Abeokuta North	Isaga Ilewo	St. Paul-Ilewo Orile; L. G. School Abese Ogongo; Loki Village; Ang Pry. School Isaga I; Ang Pry. School Isaga II; Koosa Village; S. A. A. Pry. School Kuta I; S. A. A. Pry. School Kuta II; Ang. School Ikereku I; Ang. School Ikereku II; A. C. School Atapa Ikoyi; Kukudi Village; Fagbenro Village; Alg. School Sawgote; Oluwo Village
Abeokuta North	Ibara Orile/Onisasa	Oke Ata Housing Est I; Oke Ata Housing Est II; St. Lukes Ibara Orile I; St. Lukes Ibara Orile II; Near Surakat Mosque; Near Mammy Market Alamala; A. N. L. G. Idiya; Onisasa Village; St. John's School Idi-Ori; Ilugun Village; Community Pri. Sch. Ibaro; Adeleye Village; Isale Isolo; Isale Baale; Idi-Igba Village; African Sch. Elefun Osile
Abeokuta South	Ake I	St. Peters School Ake; Centenary Hall Ake I; Centenary Hall Ake II; Bus Stop Opp. C. A. C. Isale-Ake; Bus Stop Near Petrol Station, Sale-Ake I; Bus Stop Near Petrol Station, Sale-Ake II; Open Space Molete Mkt. Erunwon I; Open Space Ibarapa Ake Mkt.; Opp. Ogbon, House Erunwon I; Opp. Ogbon, House Erunwon II; Int. Oso Balogun Hs Erunwon; St. Peters Claver School Itesi I; Christ Ang School Iporo-Ake I; Christ Ang School Iporo-Ake II; Open Space At Ago-Owe; Open Space In front Of Ake's Mosque
Abeokuta South	Ake II	New Aregba; Aregba Dispensary I; Aregba Dispensary II; Near Ese-Okuta Aregba; Opp. Ago-Ora Mosque, Aregba; A. L. G School Adatan; Open Space At Sineco I; Oke-Ola Mosques Car Wash; Near C. C. C, Asero I; Asero High School; Space Near Fajol Hotel; Bello Bajomo's House; Open Space Near Olorunkemi's Hounse; Open Space Near Paragon N/P Sch, Aregba; Alh Olowogbola Mosq. Aregba; Open Space Opp. Somoye's House; Open Space Near Foursquare Nursery Sch Opp. Stadium
Abeokuta South	Ake III	St. Augustine Pry. Sch. Adatan; St. Augustine Pry. Sch. Adatan II; Opp. Adatan Mosque; Meth Pry. Sch. Adatan I; In Front Of Ogboni's Hs Oke-Ero; Near Odutayo's Comp. Isale Abetu; C. A. C. Lantoro, Abeokuta I; Opp. Lantoro (S. H. H.) I; Lantoro High Sch. Abeokuta I; Lantoro High Sch. Abeokuta II; Open Space Near Ogunbona's Hs I; Open Space Near Ogunbona's Hs II; Open Space Near Abule-Oloni I; Near Bus-Stop Junction Oke-Lantoro, Ab
Abeokuta South	Keesi/Emere	St. Mary A/C Sch. Oke-Efon I; St. Mary A/C Sch. Oke-Efon II; Open Space Inf Ogboni's Hs Oke-Efon I; Open Space Inf Ogboni's Hs Oke-Efon II; Open Space Near Chief Y. M. Abudu's House I; Open Space Near Chief Y. M. Abudu's House II; Eben Bapt. Sch. Oke-Saje I; St. Peters Claver's Sch. Oke-Efon II; Bapt. Boys High Sch. Saje I; Bapt. Boys High Sch. Saje II; Open Space At Quarry Junction I; Emmanuel Ang. Pry. Sch. Keesi I; Open Space At Ojulakijena Keesi I; Open Space At Ojulakijena Keesi II; R. C. M. Sch. Emere I; Open Space At Isoka I; Open Space At Isoka II; Inf Of Ogboni House Emere; Open Space Near A. L. G. Aregba I; Near A. L. G. Clinic Keesi I; Near A. L. G. Clinic Keesi II; Open Space Ikopa Mosque; Inf Of Ogboni Hs Ikopa; Open Space Near Ojo Oke-Iro; A. L. G. Sch. Kugba
Abeokuta South	Ijemo	U. A. M. C. Pry Sch. Eleja; U. A. M. C. Pry Sch. Eleja II; Oba Ademola Hospital I; Oba Ademola Hospital II; R. C. M. Sch. Oke-Padre I; Bayewunmi Mosque I; Bayewunmi Mosque II; A. L. G. Dispensary; Ogboni Ijako House I; Ile Ogboni Ijako II; Sawyer's Hall; Sawyer's Hall II; Open Space Near Ogboni Ibon House; Open Space Apostolic Ijemo Agbadu I; Open Space Near Odo-Oja Booth; A. L. G. Pry. Sch. Ijerno; Open Space Near Ogunsola's House
Abeokuta South	Itoko	Open Space-Inf Of Peters Hs Itoko; E. A.;C. Pry. Sch Itoko; Open Space Oju-Agemo I; Open Space Oju-Agemo II; Open Space Shonlu Comp.; Open Space Near Apitipiti Comp.; N. U. D. Pry. School. Oke-Aleji; Open Space Ita-Gbangba; Open Space Ile-Eja; Open Space Behind Emi-Abata I; Mosque Near Hospital Isale-Itoko; Near Oke Itoko Mosque
Abeokuta South	Ijaye/Idi-Aba	Open Space At Ijaye Garage I; Open Space At Ijaye Garage II; Oja Ale Ijaiye I; Oja Ale Ijaiye II; Ist Bapt. Pry. Sch. Ijaye I; Ist Bapt. Pry. Sch. Ijaye II; Open Space Near Alh. Seye House; Ijaye Comm. Pry Sch. I; Open Space Oladosu Mosque; Open Space Near Folaranmi Hs I; Open Space Near Folaranmi Hs II; Bus-Stop At Ijaye I; Open Space Near Alh. Akanni Iroko Hs I; Open Space Near Alh. Akanni Iroko Hs II; Bode Ijaye Pry School; St. James Pry School Idi-Aba I; St. James Pry School Idi-Aba II; Bapt Pry Sch Idi-Aba I; Bapt Pry Sch Idi-Aba II; Open Space At Kenta H/Estate; Space Near Electrim; Open Space Near Iyana Odegbami; Open Space Near Oyegunle House; Opp. Tekobo Bakery; Open Space Near Kusimo's House Kemta; Open Space Near Alhaji Ayanwole's House
Abeokuta South	Erunbe/Oke Ijeun	Open Space Near Ogboni Hs, Oke Ijeun I; Open Space Near Ogboni Hs, Oke Ijeun II; Near Olorunlugo Fish Depot; Salvation Army Pry Sch.; Lisabi Pry. School; Open Space Near Ilogbo Junction I; Open Space Near Ilogbo Junction II; Open Space Near Oke-Jigbo Bus-Stop I; Open Space Near Oke-Jigbo Bus-Stop II; Open Space Near Apesin's H/S; Open Space Near Sodipe's Comp Oke-Ijeun; Open Space Inf Of Omoyayi's House; Open Space Inf Of State Hospital I; Open Space Inf Of State Hospital II; Kuti Pry. School I; Ita Agemo Erunbe I; Ita Agemo Erunbe II; Open Space Near Chief Akande's House; N. U. D. Pry Sch; Open Space Near Sojobi's House; Open Space Near Lowo House Opp.
Abeokuta South	Ago-Egun/Ijesa	Open Space Near Celestial Church Ijeun Titun; Opp. Ijeun Titun Mosque I; Open Space Near Ijeun Titun Mosque II; Open Space Inf Ekundayo's House I; Open Space Inf Ekundayo's House II; Open Space Near Bale's House Ijeun-Titun I; Open Space Near Bale's House Ijeun-Titun II; Open Space Near Ijeun Titun Lodge I; Open Space Near Agunbiade's House II (Opp. Ogboni House Eruwon I); Open Space Near Agunbiade's House II (Opp. Ogboni House Eruwon II); Open Space Near Olugbemi St. Idi-Ero; Open Space Near Aranse Oluwa Olorombo I; Open Space Near Aranse Oluwa Olorombo II; Open Space Near Oduntan's House Ago-Egun I; Open Space Near Baale Leme's House; Open Space Near Chief Derin's House [Ifesowapo]; Open Space In Front Owotutu's House; Open Space In Front Leme Central Mosque; Open Space In Front Ewang Housing Estate; Opp. Ifelodun Co-Operative C. E. S (Abiola Way)[Ifesowapo]; Booth Opp. Baba Onifa's House Leme
Abeokuta South	Sodeke/Sale-Ijeun I	Opp. Sekon's Mosq. Isale-Ijeun; Open Space Near Adeogun House Isale-Ijeun I; Open Space Near Adeogun House Isale-Ijeun II; Near Chief Dasaolu's House Isale Ijeun; Open Space Near Itanlea Idiero Sodeke I; Open Space Near Ibi-Egun-Njo Iporo; Open Space Near Central Mosq. Kobiti I; Open Space Near Central Mosq. Kobiti II; N. U. D. Pry School Isale-Ijeun I; N. U. D. Pry School Isale-Ijeun II
Abeokuta South	Sodeke/Sale-Ijeun II	Open Space Near Onjoko Mosq Oke-Bode II; Open Space Near Oke-Itoku Mosq. I; Open Space Near Oke-Itoku Mosq. II; Near Ile-Ogboni Oke-Itoku; Open Space Near Ile-Ogboni Oke-Itoku II; Open Space Near Town Planning - I; Open Space Near Town Planning - II; Open Space Ojulakijena I; Open Space Ojulakijena II; Inf. Of O. G. B. C. Imo I; Open Space Near Obamewa's House I; Open Space Near Kehinde's House; St. Joseph R. C. M. Oke-Bode I; St. Joseph R. C. M. Oke-Bode II; Open Space Near Ago-Otun I; Open Space Near Ago-Otun II; All Saint School Kobiti; Open Space Kemta Odutolu Mosq; Open Space Bus Stop, Bata Itoku I; Open Space Bus Stop, Bata Itoku II; Open Space At Odunbaku Close; Open Space Near Akinsola's House; Open Space Beside Itoku Mosque I; Open Space Beside Itoku Mosque II; Pry Sch Idi-Ape I
Abeokuta South	Imo/Isabo	Open Space Near Mrs. Kuti's House; Open Space Near Nepa Road; Near Orunsolu's House; Open Space Ita-Agemo I; Open Space Ita-Agemo II [Aro's House]; Ita Ogboni Igbein; Open Space Near Isale Igbein Mosque; Open Space Isale Igbein Mosque II; Cont. Education Centre [Zenith Bank]; Cont. Education Centre II [Imo Meth]; Open Space Near Government House I; Open Space Near Government House II [Magistrate C]; Opp. Meth Church Imo I; Near Ita-Ogboni Imo; Open Space Near Imo Mosque; Meth Pry School Oke-Yeke; Meth Pry School Oke-Yeke II; Open Space Near Arowosafe's House; Opp. Magistrate Court I; Open Space Near Kuto Bus-Stop I; Open Space Near Kuto Bus-Stop II; St. John's Pry. School I; Open Space Isale Oja I; Open Space Isale Oja II; Open Space In front Of Oke-Eri Church
Abeokuta South	Igbore/Ago Oba	St. Pauls School Igbore; Igbore Town Hall I; Igbore Town Hall II; Open Space Near Laloko Compound I; Open Space Near Laloko Compound II; Open Space Near Christ African Church I; Open Space Near Christ African Church II; Open Space Near Ntabo Mosque I; Open Space Near Ntabo Mosque II; Temidire Maternity Hospital; Open Space Near Oluwo's Compound I; Open Space Near Apostolic Faith Church; Open Space Near Ogboni's, Itori-Oke; Open Space Near 'Igbore Junction I; Open Space Near 'Igbore Junction II; Open Space Near Odo-Oyo Mosque I; Open Space Near Odo-Oyo Mosque II; A. L. G. Pry. School Ago-Oba; Meth Pry. School Ogbe I; Meth Pry. School Ogbe II; Open Space Near Itori Odo Mosque; Open Space In front Of Chief Akinremi's House (Itori-Odo); Open Space Near Ago-Oba Central Mosque
Abeokuta South	Ibara I	Open Space Near Mercy Hospital; O. L. L. Primary School Onikoko; Open Space 'saraki Ilupeju Adigbe I; Open Space Saraki Ilupeju Adigbe II; Open Space Near Safari Junction; Housing Estate Pry. Sch. Onikolobo I; Housing Estate Pry. Sch. Onikolobo II; Open Space Near Bayewunmi House I; St. Pauls Demonstration School Sodubi I; St. Pauls Demonstration School Sodubi II; Ijemo Titun High School; Open Space At Olokemeji I; Anglican High School Ibara I; Anglican High School Ibara II; Open Space Near Chief Omololu's House; Open Space Near Saraki Bus-Stop Adigbe
Abeokuta South	Ibara II	Near Idi Isin Ibara I; Near Idi Isin Ibara II; Open Space Near Oke Ipa Ijeja; Old Ijeja High School; St. Andrew Pry School Ibara; Open Space Near Bus-Stop Ita Eko; Open Space At Ogundimu Surulere At Ita-Eko; St. Annes Pry Sch. Oke-Ilewo; Opp. Old Ogun State Library; Near Maternity Centre Oke-Ilewo; G. R. A. Sports Field I; G. R. A. Sports Field II; Open Space Near Bus-Stop At Omida I; Open Space Near Bus-Stop At Omida II; Open Space Near Fidelity, Ibara; Open Space At Oluro Compound; Open Space In Front Of Ogbc; Open Space Opp. Oloke Village, Ibara Housing Estate
Ado Odo-Ota	Ota I	C. M. S Ipate I; C. M. S Ipate II; Iyedi - Titun; Ita Odo-Osi Mosque; Mabodu Square; Front Of Omoayo; Olota's Palace I; Olota's Palace II; Tigbo Square; Near Ahmadiya Mosque; Okede Square; Dosunmu's House; Ita Otun Ijagba; Abebi; Mapa Quarters; Front Of Ojo's House; Front Of Lawal's House; Front Of Local Government Qtrs
Ado Odo-Ota	Ota II	Near Deeper Life; Ewupe/Road Iyana Ilogbo; Iganmode Grammar School; Papa Aro; Oba T. T. Dada Market I; Oba T. T. Dada Market II; Front Of Egungun House I; Front Of Egungun House II; Esa Night Market I; Esa Night Market II; Borehole; Opposite U. B. A.; Zion Meth School
Ado Odo-Ota	Ota III	Idi Orogbo I; St. Peter's R. C. M.; Oju Popo; Old Motor Park I; Old Motor Park II; A. U. D. Pract School I; Modern School Road; Gra / Tomori; Oke-Suna; Ilo /Awela; Ibraheem Street; Ibraheem Olorungbebe; Near Ebodina Store; Near Asela's House; Ejigbo Titun I; Back Of Wema Bank; Near Education Authority; Toll Gate; Shopping Centre; Gra Akinwunmi; O. L. G School I, Ketere; Funmec; Behind Joju Hotel; Deeper Life Araromi; Chief Deinde's House; Ipamesan; C & S Igbala; L. G School II; T. T Dada’S Palace; Near Oyetayo's House; Idi-Orogbo II; Ejigbo Titun II; Abebi New Site; A. U. D Practising Sch. II; Allishiba Street
Ado Odo-Ota	Sango	Market Square; In Front Of Adalemo's House; Temidire Owoseni; Water Tanker I; Water Tanker II; Nepa Line Arinko I; Nepa Line Arinko II; Leventis; Layori Hospital; Old Motor Park; Near Okebowale’S House; Market Square Iloye
Ado Odo-Ota	Ijoko	Pry. School Agoro; N. U. D. School Ijoko I; Market Square Ijoko I; Market Square Ijoko II; Beside Mosque Abule Iroko I; Beside Mosque Abule Iroko II; L. G. School Aparadija I; L. G. School Aparadija II; Arije Village; Ntabo Junction I; Ntabo Junction II; Afimo Village I; Afimo Village II; Ifetedo Health Center; N. U. D. School Ijoko II
Ado Odo-Ota	Atan	U. A. C. School Koko; N. U. D. School Atan I; A/C School Lemomu; United Pry. Sch. Ajegunle; Egunla Akinbo Village; Erinle Pry School; A. C. Sch. Onse Olose; Adekoyeni Village; O. L. G. Kajola - Ibooro; Meth. Pry Sch. Oke-Ore; St. Paul's Onigbongbo; A. C. School Orita; Ajibawo Village; A/C School Igbele-Ajana; O. L. G. School Adekanbi; Old Atan Motor Park; Abule Tisa; Isaga Onlado; N. U. D. Atan II; Amode Village
Ado Odo-Ota	Iju	Iju Ebiye High School; L. G. School Oko-Omi; A/C School Mesan; L. G. School Obere; A/C School Onibuku; Ore Akinde Village; A/C School Osuke; Ayetoro Open Space; R. C. M. School Idimu; St. Peter's School Iyesi; L. G School Itori; Ilupeju Comm. Pry. School I; Housing Estate; L. G School Itele; Lafenwa Village Square; Ijuebiye Village Square; Ilupeju Comm. Pry School II
Ado Odo-Ota	Ado Odo I	R. C. M. School, Oke Padre I; R. C. M. School, Oke Padre II; Idobarun I; Idobarun II; Evening Market I- Ogona; Oja Ale; A. O. L. G. School, Ado-Odo I; A. O. L. G. School, Ado-Odo II; L. G. School Oke-Osi I; L. G. School Oke-Osi II; U. A. M. C. School Ado-Odo I; U. A. M. C. School Ado-Odo II; R. C. M. School Ado-Odo; Motor Park; Public Library I; L. G School Idi Ogede; In front Of Alhaji Adegbola's House; Idolowu Area; Agbara/Igufin; Town Hall
Ado Odo-Ota	Ado Odo II	Methodist Pry. School I; Methodist Pry. School II; A. U. D. School Ado; Agunloye Market I; L. G Sch. Ijigbo; Okuluku; Ita Egun-Nla II; All Saints School Ado-Odo I; Opposite Dispensary; Ado-Odo High School; Alamuwa Grammar School; Ita Egun Kekere; All Saint's School Ado II; In front Of Amina Hostel (Alagbe Estate); Alagbe Estate, Imale Fealafa
Ado Odo-Ota	Ere	Orita Igbekan; Methodist School Agboku I; Methodist School Agboku II; Hundo Village; L. G. School Ayede; Alaparu Ijegemo; Toyon High School; Methodist School Ere I; Methodist School Ere II; Four Square Church Ileji; R. C. M. Ikoga - Ile; L. G. School Akonsun; U. A. M. C. School Okanran; Okanran Tafi; A/C School, Bandu; Rcm Sch. Eroko Eruku; L. G. School - Ijegemo; Asokere Village Square; Idolehin Isale; Pry. School Ijigbo; Ago Sango Idolehin; Onilogbo; Itire R. C. M School; Arigbo Village Square
Ado Odo-Ota	Alapoti	Baptist Day School Olorun Leke; C. A. C. School Alapoti I; C. A. C. School Alapoti II; U. A. M. C. Dodo; Inawole - Idosaba; Ijigbe; Meth. Pry. Sch. Idobarun; R. C. M Sch. Isalu; Oko- Oba; E. A. C Oloparun I; E. A. C Oloparun II; Ijomo; U. A. M. C Elemoki; Ibeku - Papasa; Idiota; Baptist Sch. Iloro
Ado Odo-Ota	Ketu-Adie-Owe	L. G. School Idanyin; L. G. School Ketu; Alago Village Square; Ajerogun Village Square; Salvation Army Sch. Idoye; Atoko Village Square; Methodist School Odugbe; L. G. School Egundobale; Irebale/Kuoye/Isaga; Eguntedo; Akinwunmi Village Square; A/C School Akoore; Salvation Army School Edu; Lusada Market Square; Isaga
Ado Odo-Ota	Igbesa	Baptist Day School; L. G. School, Igbesa I; L. G. School, Igbesa II; Motor Park; Esa Ogona I; All Saints Ang. School I; Igbesa High School; Sal. Army School; L. G Elero; Near Oba's Palace I; Near Oba's Palace II; Esa Ogona II
Ado Odo-Ota	Agbara I	Salvation Army School I; Opic Area; Agbara Estate I; Agbara Estate II; L. G. School Igere; Odan; Ipetedo/Iperin; Diya Gate; Jida Area; Korogbeji; Isale Jida; Isale Agbara; Salvation Army School II; Medina Estate
Ado Odo-Ota	Agbara/Ejila Awori	L. G. School Ipatira I; L. G. School Ipatira II; St. Jude's Ang. School Itekun; Imole Village Square; A. U. D. School. Ewutagbe; A/C School Odan Abuja I; A/C School Odan Abuja II; A U D Ikogbo I (Imole Village Square); Agelete Village; Agbo-Odo Village; A. U. D. School I Ikogbo II
Yewa North	Ido Foi	Ita Agberido; Ita Koro/Sasa; Aye Toro Motor Park; Ita Baale Olowonyo; Rock Of Ages I; Rock Of Ages II; Near Post Office, Water Works; Near Post Office, Itakumolu; Baptist School Agboro; Akanni Oke Village; Y. N. L. G. School Bamajo; Methodist School Igbori; Abule Iya Kekere; Abule Yewa Disu; Y. N. L. G. School Yewa Ketu; Comm. Pry. School Sekere; A. U. D. School Opete; Front Of Licensing Office; Obiri Village; Comm. Pry. School Atokun; Ita Afoyinsebe; Awela Olatunji; Ita Bale Morowosola; Arm Children Sch; Ita Dandy Idagba; Ido Foi Town Hall; Ita Durosimi
Yewa North	Aye Toro I	A/C School Aye Toro; Near The Palace, Ayetoro; Near Jolan Block Industry; Compro Gate I; Front Of Obalaju Hall; Ita Olaleye; Ita Opebiyi; Near Boomo Mosque I; Ita Adaraloye; Ita Olowu; Mechanic Junction; Ita Dada Joga, Aye Toro; Boomo Mosque II; Ita Baale, Eemado; Ita J. K.; Compro. Gate II
Yewa North	Aye Toro II	Ita Egunjobi; Customary Court, Aibo; Oja Baale Saala; Ita Mosalasi Saala; Y. N. L. G. School, Saala; A. U. D. School I, Ayetoro; C. A. C. School Ago-Imala I; Ita Gbanka; U. P. S. Ayetoro I; Ita Baba Mogba; Old Ilaro Motor Park; Old Local Govt. Secretariat; C. A. Ac. School - Ago-Imala II; U. P. S. School II - Ayetoro
Yewa North	Sunwa	Oke Oyinbo, Saala Orile School; R. C. M./Ijaka Oke; Ita Oja, Saala Orile; C. A. C. School Sunwa; Y. N. L. G. School, Erinpa; Methodist School, Igan Okoto; Ita Oja, Igan-Okoto; Comm. Hall Sawonjo; Ita Areke I; Ita Areke II; U. N. A. School Abule Taiwo; Bapt. Day School, Ijaka-Isale; Y. N. L. G. School Agbawo; Farm Settlement Sawonjo; Motor Park, Igan - Okoto; Ita Amosa, Igan - Okoto; Baptist Day School Ijaka-Isale II
Yewa North	Iboro/Joga	Near Dispensary Igbooro I; Near Dispensary Igbooro II; Near Anglican Church, Igbooro; St. John Pry. School Ijako; St. Peter's Pry School, Joga; Obalaju Hall Joga; Market Square, Joga I; Market Square, Joga II
Yewa North	Imasai	Christ Church - Imasai; Market Square, Imasai I; Market Square, Imasai II; Near Ita Ilori; Oke Ilemo; Aga Odofin Church Area; Maria I
Yewa North	Ebute Igbooro	Y. N. L. G. School Ebute Igbooro; Ita Baale Gbedun; Pry. School Refurefu; Y. N. L. G. School Oja Odan; Ita Ogundipe (Ije Area); N. U. D. Pry Sch. Orobiyi; Ita Abisekan Ebute Igbooro; Ita Simeon Apetu Oja Odan; Ita Apakose Oja Odan; Yewa School Ologiri; C. F. School Akeru; Ita Laditan; Ita Faleru; Y. N. L. G. School II Oja-Odan; Ita Molete, Ebufte-Igbooro; Ita Baale Ikotun; Y. N. L. G. School Gbogo; Owode Balogun
Yewa North	Ohunbe	Y. N. L. G. School Igbeme; Comm. Pry. School Kobejo; Comm. Pry. School Ibayun; Baptist School Abule Idi; Y. N. L. G. School Gbokoto; Comm. Pry. School Iyana Meta; Ita Oba Iselu; Comm. Pry School Agbon Ojodu; Y. N. L. G. School Ibeku; Y. N. L. G. School Asa; Y. N. L. G. School Kodera; Y. N. L. G. School Ohunbe; Ita Baale Obele; A/C School Orile Igbooro; Y. N. L. G. School Isuku; Ita Baale Isale Agbon; Ita Baale Moro; Ita Baale Agbon-Ojodu II
Yewa North	Igua	Near Central Mosque, Igua; Court Hall - Igua; Comm. Pry. School Igbo - Iju; Y. N. L. G. School - Sagbon; Oja Age; Ketu College, Iganalade; Ang. Pry Sch, Lasilo I; Ang. Pry Sch, Lasilo II; Y. N. L. G. School Owode Ketu; Ita Fabuyi Owode Ketu; United Ang. School Tata; Ita Elegbede Imoto; Comm. Pry. School Igboota; C. M. S. Church Eleja; Market Square Tata; Ita Baale Aina Asipa; Ita Baale Oladoke Imoto; Mokota Owode Ketu; Ita Otutu Igua; Idi Ose Area, Igan Alade; Yewa Central School, Igan Alade; Idi-Ori Village; Ita Baale, Ika Orile; Iranji Motor Park; Kabiri Village Square; Odan Iga
Yewa North	Ijoun	Market Area, Ijoun; Ita Otun Isenjoun; Ita Boromu, Ile Ijoun I; Ita Boromu, Ile Ijoun II; Y. N. L. G. School Ijale Ketu; Y. N. L. G. School Aworo; Cooperative Hall Tobolo; Ita Julius Ayetoro Oguba; Ita Baale Gbokofin; Y. N. L. G. School, Idigbo; Bapt. Day School, Oke Ola; Y. N. L. G. School, Igbonla; C. P. S. Ipinle I; C. P. S. Ipinle II; Ita Asoju Igbore Oke; Y. N. L. G. School, Ijoun; Ita Baale Bangidangi; Mokoya Olalotan; Ita Baale Asaga; Ita Baale Oke Odo Tobolo; E. A. C. Premises Ibiyan; Market Area II
Yewa North	Ibese	Comm. Pry. School - Agido; Bapt. Day School Igbogila; Ita Oladoke; Near Central Mosque; Ita Oladehin; Ita Dopemu; Water Works; Ita Kumolu; Ita Omolegbe; U. N. A. School Balogun; St. John Ang. School Wasimi Imasai; Ang. School Abule Oke; U. A. M. C. School Ibese; Y. N. L. G. School Orita; Y. N. L. G. School - Komi Oba; Library Premises Ibese; Ita Baale Ilewo Araromi; Oja Osan Igbogila; Ita Bada Igbogila; Omilende Village Square
Yewa South	Ilaro I	State Hospital; Opp. Soyinka's House I; Opp. Soyinka's House II; Near Idowu's House/Otegbeye Street I; Near Idowu's House/Otegbeye Street II; Oba Fasina Close Junction I; Oba Fasina Close Junction II Gbokolo; Egbo Alaparun; U. A. M. C. School Pahayi; Orita Kajola I; Orita Kajola II; E. S. L. G. School Ijanna; Ita Iyalode; Oke-Ola - Area; Poly. Gate; Library / Rural Health Centre; Orisun Iran /Ilodo
Yewa South	Ilaro II	Christ Apostolic Church (Cac) School Ilaro; Open Space Beside Apostolic (Christ Apostolic Church Ilaro); Oju-Iyewa Square, Ilaro I; Oju-Iyewa Square, Ilaro II; E. S. L. G. School Ilaro; Handicapped School Ilaro I; Hardicapped School Ilaro II; U. A. M. School Ilaro I; Oronna High School; Ago Isaga Square Ilaro I; Ago Isaga Square Ilaro II; Open Space At Oduntan's Area; Booth At Iganmu; Opp. Co-Op Bank Ilaro
Yewa South	Ilaro III	Christ Church School Ilaro; Oronna Town Hall I; Oronna Town Hall II; Baptist Day School Ilaro; A. U. D. School Ilaro I; A. U. D. School Ilaro II; Ahmadiya Nursery& Pry. Sch. Ilaro I; Ahmadiya Nursery & Pry. Sch. Ilaro II; N. U. D. School Ilaro I; N. U. D. School Ilaro II; Kumoye Street Ilaro I; Kumoye Street Ilaro II; Methodist School Gbogidi I; Methodist School Gbogidi II; E. S. G. School II Modeolu I; E. S. G. School II Modeolu II; R. C. M. School Ilaro I; R. C. M. School Ilaro II; Ileba Quarters Ilaro; Rocky Nite Club I; Rocky Nite Club II; E. A. C. School Ilaro; Open Space Near Baptist Area; Open Space At Olorunsogo; Oke Okuta Area
Yewa South	Iwoye	A/C School Iwoye; Baptist Day School Ipake; E. S. L. G. School Iweke; Comm. Square Isaga Amosun; Yewa-Mata Village Square; St. Peters School Ijado; Olorulekan Village I; Olorulekan Village II; U. A. M. C. School Olorunda; E. S. L. G. School Asato; Jaja Village; Opp. Comm High School, Iwoye; Ajo Village I; Ajo Village II; Irogun Akere; Sodinro/Adewale Village
Yewa South	Idogo	African Church School Idogo; Methodist School Idogo; U. A. M. C. School Olute; Methodist School Igbeji; U. N. A. School Ipaja; Methodist School Fagbohun; African School Olokuta; All Saints School Itoro; E. S. L. G. School, Idologun; Booth At Abule - Onile; E. S. L. G. School Kakanfo; Abule Olopa; Iga -Otun Olokunta; Rcm Sch Idogo; Olokuta Village II; Ojete Omilende Village
Yewa South	Oke Odan	St. James School Oke-Odan I; St. James School Oke-Odan II; A/C School Oke-Odan; Baptist Day School Oke-Odan I; Baptist Day School Oke-Odan II; E. S. L. G. School Eyekanse; Methodist School Owo I; Methodist School Owo II; E. S. L. G. School Ajise; R. C. M. School Isagbo Ere I; R. C. M. School Isagbo Ere II; St. James School R. M. II Oke-Odan I; St. James School R. M. II Oke Odan II; A/C School R. M. II Oke Odan I; A/C School R. M. II Oke-Odan II; Open Space At Oke-Odan I; K & S Church Oke-Odan II; R. C. M. School Ijako; R. C. M. School Owo I; R. C. M. School Owo II; Methodist School Rm II Owo; Orisada-Eyo Village Square; Old Market Square; Agosi Village
Yewa South	Owode I	Booth Near Alapara Mosque Owode I; Booth Near Alapara Mosque Owode II; Booth Near C. A. C. Church I; Booth Near C. A. C. Church II; Near Church Of The Lord Aladura I; Near Church Of The Lord Aladura II; Comm. Town Hall, Owode I; Comm. Town Hall, Owod II; Near Ahmadiyya Mosque Owode I; Near Ahmadiyya Mosque Owode II; Opp. He-Goat Market, Owode I; Opp. He-Goat Market, Owode II; Owode Near Market; Army Children School Owode I; Army Children School Owode II; Old Slaughter's Slab; Booth At Irepodun Square; Army Children School III; Moricas Arabic Sch Ago-Egun (Opp); Front Of Seye's Bakery
Yewa South	Owode II	Booth At Amule-Kangbo Square; Booth At Post Office Owode I; Booth At Post Office Owode II; Open Space Near Methodist I, Sabo; Open Space Near Methodist II, Sabo; E. S. L. G. School Owode; Open Space At Apostolic 4-Corner Area I; Open Space At Apostolic 4-Corner Area II; Comm. Pry School Owode I; Comm. Pry School Owode II; Area Comm. High School Owode I; Area Comm. High School Owode II; Yidi Str. Temidire Mosque; Old Sabo Market Owode I; Old Sabo Market Owode II; Booth At Old R. C. C. Ado-Odo Road
Yewa South	Ilobi/Erinja	Dispensary Oke-Erinja; Open Space At Erinja-Ile; E. S. L. G. School - Ilobi; C. A. C. School Oko-Baba; E. S. L. G. School Alagbon I; E. S. L. G. School Alagbon II; E. S. L. G. School Alagbon III; Customary Court Hall, Ilobi; Opp. Market Garage; E. S. L. G. School Erinja Orile
Yewa South	Ajilete	Customary Court Hall Ajilete I; Customary Court Hall Ajilete II; A. U. D. School Ajilete I; A. U. D. School Ajilete II; St. John's School Ajilete I; Yewa High School Ajilete I; Yewa High School Ajilete II; Eslg School – Kajola (Apostolic Church 4-Corner Area I); A. U. D. School Yidi Alagba (Apostolic Church 4-Corner Area II); E. S. L. G. School Kajola; Booth At Oju-Ota Square; Comm. Pry School Ibio; Dispensary Eredo; Booth Beside A/C Ajilete; Beside Ago-Eyo Mosque I; Beside Ago-Eyo Mosque II; Ori-Okuta Square Ilaro Quarters; St. John's School Block II
Ewekoro	Abalabi	Community Hall Abalabi I; Community Hall Abalabi II; School Prem Sojuolu I; School Prem Sojuolu II; St. Paul Ang. Sch. Sojuolu I; St. Paul Ang. Sch. Sojuolu II; United School Olorunda Station; Town Hall Olorunda I; Town Hall Olorunda II; L. G. School Opeyaka I; L. G. School Opeyaka II; Bapt Sch. Idi Aga; African Church Sch. Ajegunle I; African Church Sch. Ajeguunle II; African Church Sch. Ajegunle III; Open Space Near Town Hall, Abalabi; Open Space At Gbokolu Village; Open Space At Igbo-Aje Village, Olokuta; Sch Premises Oteyi Alagbede
Ewekoro	Asa/Yobo	A/C School Agodo; A/C School Yobo; Open Space At Asa Tepede; School Premises Asa Obintin; Lala Town Hall; Asa Olowo; Near School Prem Yobo; Asa-Apalolo; Open Space At Isale Egba Agodo Town; Open Space At Abale Adafune Agodo; Open Space At Kajola Village
Ewekoro	Arigbajo	U. D. C. School Arigbajo I; U. D. C. School Arigbajo II; Oko Kogbodoku; L. G. School Ejio; Open Space At Soderu; Open Space At Apomu; Methodist School Abese; Open Space At Elebute Village Square
Ewekoro	Itori	Market Square Itori I; Market Square Itori II; Iyana Station I; Iyana Station II; Opp. Meternity Centre Itori I; Opp. Maternity Centre Itori II; Open Space At U. N. A. Lapeleke; Open Space At Oke Oko Hall Square; A/C School Olujobi; A/C School Onikoko; Health Centre Sowunmi; A/C School Elegbata; School Prem. Elefon I; School Prem. Elefon; School Prem. Afowowa-Gbelu II; Bapt. Day School Eruku; Ikereku Olodo; A/C School Obanlado; A/C School Oluke [Wasimi Abule Vill]; Open Space At Bolowosere Village; Open Space At Adumbu Village; Open Space At Lemo Village; Open Space At Telu Village; Jaguna Village Square; Open Space At Oluke Village; Open Space At Keulagbe Village
Ewekoro	Elere/Onigbedu	Open Space At Koboro (Near Nepa Transformer); St. Simeon School Elere/Abuletitun I; St. Simeon School Elere/Abule Titun II; Open Space At Ajipatutu; A/C School Onigbedu I; A/C School Onigbedu II; A/C School Babalawo; A/C School Aga - Olowo; A/C School Atola; Occhs Field; In front Of Baale's House Elere Adubi; Open Space At Morekete/Ilefun
Ewekoro	Papalanto	Papalanto High School I; Papalanto High School II; United Central School Isofin; L. G. School Ayepe; A/C School Wasimi Alafia I; A/C School Wasimi Alafia II; Town Hall Abule Odo; Open Space At Ewekoro Village I; Open Space At Ewekoro Village II; Bapt. School Ewekoro; Open Space At Oko Lemo; Araromi Area Village Square; Open Space At Akinbo Village; Open Space At Ajegunle Egbado; Open Space At Abule Otun
Ewekoro	Wasimi	Town Hall Wasimi I; Town Hall Wasimi II; St. Michael School Wasimi; A/C School Baiye; A/C School Awado; Open Space At Tepona Village; Open Space At Otugade; Pry. School Ogbere; A/C School Loti
Ewekoro	Mosan	Open Space At Ade-Agba Village Square; Open Space At Osupori Village Square; Pry. School Mosan; Pry. School Oteyi Olokuta; Pry. School Sigo Opalola; Wasimi Orile; Isale Station I; Isale Station II; Pry. School Igbin Ojo; Teemu Village; Igbin Arowosegbe Village
Ewekoro	Owowo	Bapt. School Akinale; A/C School Owowo; Pry. School Ijumo-Ologboni; A. U. D. School Eleyele; A/C School Akinbiye; Owowo High School; Akinjole Village Square
Ewekoro	Obada-Oko	St. John School Ayedere; Iwokun Village; Pakudi; Town Hall Obada-Oko; Ogunsolu; Iyana Ikereku; Market Area Obada-Oko; Asipa Village; Banjoko
Ifo	Ifo I	Isopako I; Isopako II; Front Of Mosque I; Front Of Mosque II; Front Of Mosque III; Adenrele Pry. School I; Adenrele Pry. School II; Olose Pry. School I; Olose Pry. School II; Agric. Phase I; Agric. Phase II; Agric. Phase III
Ifo	Ifo II	R. C. M. School I; R. C. M. School II; R. C. M. School III; Okenla Road I; Okenla Road II; Front Of Emmanuel Church I; Front Of Emmanuel Churech II; Hausa Quarters I; Hausa Quarters II; Coker Road Junction I; Coker Road Junction II; Craig Lane Ilupeju I; Craig Lane Ilupeju II
Ifo	Ifo III	Oluomo-Road; Williams House I; Williams House II; Orile Ifo II; Orile Ifo (Opp. Apata Mosque); Alfa Salisu/Yidi I; Alfa Salisu/Yidi II; Alfa Salisu/Yidi III; Front Of Seriki House I; Front Of Seriki House II; Agosi Estate I; Agosi Estate II; Agosi Estate III; Near Idere Bakery I; Near Idere Bakery II; Abekoko Right I; Abekoko Right II; Abekoko Right III; Oluomo's Quarters I; Oluomo's Quarters II; Local Govt. Sch. Abekoko I; Local Govt. Sch. Abekoko II; Local Govt. Sch. Abekoko III; Olu-Omo Road II
Ifo	Iseri	School Premises, Iseri I; School Premises, Iseri II; Mawere; Iwo Junction I; Iwo Junction II; Iwo Junction III; Kajola Junction I; Kajola Junction II; Yakoyo I; Yakoyo II; School Premises, Ojodu I; School Premises, Ojodu II; School Premises, Ojodu III; School Premises, Ojodu IV; Wariwa/Baoku Village I; Wariwa/Baoku Village II; Igbehin Adun I; Igbehin Adun II; C. M. S. Ago-Ijaye
Ifo	Ajuwon/Akute	School Premises Ajuwon I; School Premises Ajuwon II; Ogunlowo I; Ogunlowo II; Ogunlowo III; Ojo Sunmonu I; Ojo Sunmonu II; Sch. Prem. Akute/Fabolade I; Sch. Prem. Akute/Fabolade II; Sch. Prem. Akute/Fabolade III; Isasi I; Isasi II; Araromi/Moricas I; Araromi/Moricas II; Araromi/Moricas III; Z. I. School II Akute I; Z. I. School II Akute II; Taju Bello (Abekoko) I; Taju Bello (Abekoko) II; Baale Akinosi I; Baale Akinosi II; Baale Akinosi III; Baale Akinosi IV; Baale Akinosi V; Baale Akinosi VI; Iju Aga Market I; Iju Aga Market II; Iju Aga Market III; Gaun I; Gaun II; Ajuwon Village I; Ajuwon Village II; Ajuwon Village III; Ajuwon Junction I; Ajuwon Junction II; Egan Ado Area; Onibudo; Power Line
Ifo	Oke-Aro/Ibaragun/Robiyan	Okun Gbolu I; Okun Gbolu II; School Prem Matogun I; School Prem Matogun II; School Prem. Robiyan; Sch. Prem Ibaragun I; Sch. Prem Ibaragun II; Sch. Prem. Oke Aro I; Sch. Prem. Oke Aro II; Sch. Prem. Oke Aro III; Sch. Prem. Oke Aro IV; Ope Ilu Idiroko I; Ope Ilu Idiroko II; Yewande I; Yewande II; Yewande III; Yewande IV; Olambe I; Olambe II; Itoki I; Itoki II; Adiyan Ajegunle I; Adiyan Ajegunle II; Adiyan Ajegunle III; Peter Village Junction I; Peter Village Junction II; Legun Village; Oluwo Jafa I; Oluwo Jafa II; Abule Ekun I; Abule Ekun II; Enilolobo Yewande
Ifo	Ososun	Sch. Prem. Ososun; Baamu; Balogun Village; Sch. Prem. Olomu; Sch. Prem Seriki I; Sch. Prem Seriki II; Agbegise; Oyero Village; Sch. Prem Oluke; Rate Office Ijoko I; Rate Office Ijoko II; Olayemi Pry. School; Sch. Prem Alaja; Sch. Prem. Kajola; Lerin Village; Sonekan Village; Demokula
Ifo	Sunren	Ang. School Sunren; School Prem Apode; School Prem. Isola; School Prem. Oba Oke; Obasa Market; Loki Village; Yanbi Village; Olorunsogo
Ifo	Ibogun	Akinsinde I; Akinsinde II; St. Davis Sch. Sowunmi I; St. Davis Sch. Sowunmi II; Sch. Prem. Sowunmi I; Sch. Prem. Sowunmi II; A/C Sch. Oderinlo I; A/C Sch. Oderinlo II; Oloparun Village I; Oloparun Village II; Sogunje; Alapako Oke; Olaogun I; Olaogun II; Olaogun III
Ijebu East	Ijebu Mushin I	Odosegbonrin/Itamatun; Idona Central; St. Peters Clever Pry. Sch.; Ewuren Square; Local Govt. Pry. School; St. Andrews Sch. Imuwen I; St. Andrews Sch. Imuwen II; Federal Technical Ita Mogiri; Esure Junction; Ehinade Comm. Pry Sch. Idomodu
Ijebu East	Ijebu Mushin II	Mushin Market Square; St. Mary's Pry Okepo I; St. Mary's Pry Okepo II; L. G. School, Kokunesere; Near Health Centre Ilodo; Ajebo United Pry. Sch. Ikala - 006; Open Space Infornt Of Jejeniwa's House; Tojoro Junction; St. Mary's Sch. Extension; Idokunusi Centre; Frontage Of Adesanya's House Ilagunjo
Ijebu East	Ijebu Ife I	Itako Square; St. Louis Cath. Pry., Sch. Ife.; Itunmodu Square; Ang. Pry Sch. Ijebu-Ife; Baptist School II Ijebu Ife; Moborode; Odoladalepo Square; Irowo Square; Itoro/Odata Square; Igbodu; Beside Obada Market
Ijebu East	Ijebu Ife II	Town Hall Ijebu, Ife I; Town Hall Ijebu, Ife II; Court Hall; Oduduwa Square; Timorowo Square; Moslem School II; Tirosogun Square; Abidagba Village; Ehinade Ilase; Square Near Mosque; Iwaya Road; Baptist Sch. I, Oke Ife
Ijebu East	Owu	Anglican Pry. School Owu I; Anglican Pry. School Owu II; Community Pry. Sch. Onipetesi; L. G. Sch. Egbeda; Aba Okonzin Junction; Ang. Pry. Sch. II Ago Owu; Ajepodo; Togunmaga; Gbamugbamu; Abu Soro; Town Hall, Iloro
Ijebu East	Itele	St. John's Sch. Itele I; St. John's Sch. Itele II; Cath. Pry. Sch. Itele; Itele Motor Park; St. James Sch. Atoyo; St. Peters Sch. Oko-Eko; St. John's Sch. Lumafon; Comm. Pry. Sch. Imegun; Opp. Health Post Tigbori; Comm. Square Awotunde; Agerige
Ijebu East	Ogbere	Palace Frontage; Near Motor Park Ogbere; St. Mary School Ogbere I; St. Mary School Ogbere II; Comm. Pry. School Kajola; St. Pauls Sch. Uro; St. Pauls Sch. Oguru; Moborode Village; J. 3; St. John's Sch. Korede; Local Government Sch. Imayan; Orita Imobi; Trianga
Ijebu East	Imobi I	St. Mary's School Fowoseje I; St. Mary's School Fowoseje II; Cath. Pry. Sch. Potedo; Denuren; Moslem Pry. Sch. Ita Pampa; Moslem Pry. Sch. Terelu; Toliwo Oke-Imobi; Mafowoku
Ijebu East	Imobi II	Cath. School Itasin; Cath. School Ebute - Imobi; Ang. Pry. Sch. Oki-Araromi; Cath. Sch. Oki- Igbode I; Cath. Sch. Oki- Igbode II; St. Columbus Oke - Makun; Tegun Silu Square; Totunba
Ijebu East	Ajebandele	Community Pry. School Orita J 4; Ajegbende; Orisumbare; St. Saviour's Sch. Ajebandele I; St. Saviour's Sch. Ajebandele II; Comm. Pry. Sch. Oloji; Comm. Pry. Sch. Aberu; St. Peters Sch. Fowowa J4; Open Space At Alafia Camp; Ajelanwa
Ijebu North	Atikori	In Front Of Oloyede's House; Christ Disciples School; Near Bogijie's House I; Near Bogijie's House II; Health Centre, Oke - Ife I; Health Centre, Oke - Ife II; St. James' School I; In Front Of Dr. Sojobi's House I; In Front Of Dr. Sojobi's House II; In Front Of Jeboda's House I; In Front Of Jeboda's House II; In Front Of Imam's House Okumoje I; In Front Of Imam's House Okumoje II; In Front Of Onigbure's House; Dagbolu Motor Park; Health Centre; St. James' School II
Ijebu North	Japara/Ojowo	In Front Of Nubi Carpenter's House; At Local Govt. Market; In Front Of Oloritun's House; St. Mathew School II; At Vicarage; St. Mathew School I; St. Luke's School, Japara; Front Of Sodina's House 008; Front Of Health Centre, Japara; Front Of Ayanwale's House Ojowo; Front Of Alhaji Lawals House Odoraboyeji; Front Of Abegunde's House Aledo; Front Of Abegunde's House Aledo II; Roundabout Odosenbadejo; Abidun Hall; Front Of Adaramaja' House; Front Of S. S. Banjo's House
Ijebu North	Omen	Papa Ologboni's Village; Ipakodo Village; Dagbolu Local Govt. Sch. I; Dagbolu Local Govt. Sch. II; Ita Egba Anglican Sch.; L. G. Sch. Lumogede; L. G. Sch. Ganrigan, Japara; Ajebandele Ogunye Village; Okoliyan Village; Odulaja Baale Pry. School; Idioparun Village I; Idioparun Village II; Eridu Village; Orita Agbade I; Orita Agbade II; Aba Titun Village I; Aba Titun Village II; Oshunbudepo I; Oshunbudepo II; Agbalason Village; Odulaja House; Idioparun Village
Ijebu North	Oke Agbo	Opp. Ojubanire's House I; Opp. Ojubanire's House II; Front Of Odeku's House Okemoro I; Front Of Odeku's House Okemoro II; Front Of Easy Life House I; Holy Angel's Pry. Sch. Idosa; St. Philips School II; Front Of Eleyun's House; St. Philips School I; L. G. Pry. School Aledo; Front Of Chief Badejo's House (Babamo) I; Front Of Chief Badejo's House (Babamo) II; Front Of Dacostal's House; Front Of Igamosa; Front Of Aledo's Mosq.; Beside Idesan Mosq. I; Beside Idesan Mosq. II; Opp. Y. K. Alaso Oke's House I; Opp. Y. K. Alaso Oke's House II; Opp. Apole's House; In Front Of Bala Bukola's House; Kadiri Junction; In Front Of Easy Life House II; Front Of Eleyin's House
Ijebu North	Oke Sopin	Space At Odo Balogun's; Front Of Alh. Alubankudi's House I; Front Of Alh. Alubankudi's House II; St. John's Cath. Sch., Oke Padi; St. John's Cath. Sch., Oke Padi II; Near Legumsen Mosq. Itowo; Odoyangusise Junction; Space At Ojolo; Near Odobotu's Mosq. I; Front Of Funwondara Mosq. I; Obada Motor Park; Idi-Aba Igbaire; Moslem School Igbare I; Moslem School Igbare II; Front Of Odoraye's House; Beside Public Library Ogungbo Street I; Beside Public Library Ogungbo Street II; Beside Itowo Mosque; St. John's School, Oke Jaga; Beside Odoramusegun Mosque; A. U. D. Pry. School Oke-Sopin; Front Of Olly The Tailor I; Front Of Paramole's House, Oke Tako; Shoka's Junction; Front Of Odorasoyin; Beside Taden Garden Hotel Egbe; Odo-Balogun Junction; Front Of Funwondara's House II; Moslem School, Igbaire III; Near Odobotu's Mosq. II; Front Of Alubankudi’S House III; Front Olly Tailor II
Ijebu North	Oru/Awa/Ilaporu	Sagun United Pry. Sch. - Oru; Itale Awa; Ajebo Moslem School, Oru; St. Marks Pry Sch. Falafomu Oru; Wesley Sch. Awa; Moslem School Awa; Ajegunle Pry. School, Awa; St. Rose's Cath. School, Oru; Idofe Comp. High School, Oru; Itale Oru I; St. Michael's Ang. School, Aredi-Awa; In Front Of Tiyamiyu House, Oke-Ife Oru; Oke Sewon Awa; In Front Of Jimoh Nusi's House Ilaporu; In Front Of Alaporu's Palace; Itale Oru II; Front Of Musi's House; Open Space Methodist Church Awa
Ijebu North	Ago Iwoye I	L. G. Area Office; Oyinkoro Junction; R. Odus's Junction; Near Owoseni's House; Idode Wesley School; Idode Junction; Opp. Adesegun's House; Local Govt. School, Igan; In Front Of Osiyemi's House; Wesley Pry. School; Odomolasa Village; In Front Of Ogunmosu's House I; Moslem School, Oke-Odo; In Front Of Baale's House; In Front Of Ogunmosu's House II; In Fron Of Odekomaiya’S House; Booth Opp. Fagbamila's House; Booth Near Onanuga's House; Booth Opp. Baale's Mabinu's House; Booth Opp. Duniya's House
Ijebu North	Ago Iwoye II	Omoedumare Model Pry. School; Near Alh. Olowo Igbo's House; Front Of Adegberin's House; Okanlawon Junction; Ako Moslem School; In Front Of Osiyokun Imoisisi Quarters; Odo Yangburin's Junction; Front Of Akinsola’S House; Imosisi Wesley School; Open Space In Front Of J. M. K's House; Front Of Ogun Sowobo's House; Muslim High School; Imere Moslem School; Beside High Class; St. Paul's Pry. School Imere; Ago Iwoye Secondaty School; Booth Opp. Kunkusi’S House; Booth Opp. Gbindin's House
Ijebu North	Ako-Onigbagbo/Gelete	Ako Wesley School; Ipado Village; Elegbere Junction; Idiakala Ang. School; L. G. School Farm Settlement I; L. G. School Farm Settlement II; Oke Egbe Wesley School; Odoye Moslem School I; Odoye Moslem School II; Oke Biritiro Junction; Idagolu Village; Ipakodo Village; Eredo Wesley School; Oke Mase Village; Oriwu Village; Local Govt. School Oko-Odo; Orile Ibipe Village
Ijebu North	Mamu/Etiri	Aba Pana Village; Wesley School Erikamo; Oke Erigba Village; Wesley School Ehim Etiri; L. G. School, Awori, J. J.; Origbanla Village; Elegunesan Pry Sch.; L. G. School Oke-Mojo; Oke Arowa Village; Ipakodo Village; Health Centre Mamu I; Obada Village; Ereginrin Village; Igan Orile; Health Centre Mamu II; Semoru Ogunoiki; Health Centre Mamu III; Booth At Odo Ejogun; Booth At Eriaje; Methodist Sch. Oke-Mojo
Ijebu North East	Atan/Imuku	R. C. M. Pry. School Atan I; Front Of Olumoku Palace; Odogogo Village Centre; African Church Bethel Sch. Idona; A/C Pry. School Odotu; Front Of Imafon Mosque; Front Of L. G. E. A. Imuroko; St. Peter's Pry. School Iwaye; L. G. Pry School Imuku/Isowe; Igbasa Village Square
Ijebu North East	Odosimadegun/Odosebora	St. John's Pry. Sch. Odosimadegun; Ilodu, Frontage Orekoya's House; Christ Church Sch. Odosenbora; C. A. C. Pry School Odosiwonade; Ilugun Central Academy Ibido; Ebenezer Pry. Sch. Omutedo; St. Peter's Pry. Sch. Oke-Aye; Frontage Onakoya's House Iworomosun; St. Paul's Pry School Oriwu; Frontage Baale's House Idorunwon; Frontage Baale's House Gbawonjo; Oketi Orlando's House; Frontage New Church Odosenbora; St. Paul Sch. Odosugbagbawa Village; Ilumerin Village Centre; Iworomosun
Ijebu North East	Imewiro/Ododeyo/Imomo	Comm. Pry. Sch. Imewuro; Market Square Idode; Catholic Pry. School Imomo I; Ang. Church Odedoye; St. John's Pry. Sch. Idode I; Frontage Baale's House Ibadan - Ijebu; Frontage Baale Tikeku Akunrundun - Ebute; Frontage Owotomo's House Iworo; Ang. Pry School Orunwa; St. Michael's Pry. Sch. Ododeyo; Vicarage Frontage, Imewuro; Eti Obu Junction Aledo Ododeyo; Aledo Ododeyo; Aba Yusuff; Village Square Oke Eki
Ijebu North East	Odesenlu	Christ Church Sch. Odosenlu I; Christ Church Sch. Odosenlu II; Oju Ore Square Ground; Frontage Mosque At Odoregbe I; Oke-Ola; Oke Olowu; Ilone
Ijebu North East	Igede/Itamarun	Catholic Pry. School Igede; A. C. H. S. Itamarun; St. Peter's School Odogbondu; Frontage Ogunkoya's House - Okeyejo; Frontage Bola's House Egbe; Okelugbongun
Ijebu North East	Oju Ona	St. Michael's Sch. Ipari Nla; Iworo Town Hall; Town Hall, Oke Agbonle; Ipari Oke; Odokalaba; Frontage Baale's House - Itebu; Odogbe Village Square; Frontage Owotomo's House
Ijebu North East	Isoyin	Emmanuel Pry. Sch. Isonyin; Isonyin Grammar School; Front Of Baale's House - Isonyin; Odole Junction; United Pry. Sch. Apuneein; Arabic Pry. Sch. Isonyin; Front Of Baale's House Agbowa; Front Of Bale Ilupa; Front Of Itun Olugbala
Ijebu North East	Ilese	Moslem Pry. Sch. Ilese I; Idomowo Village Center; Army Barracks I; Idomila Village Square; Akitipa; Oke Lisa Ilese I; Ilore; Aledo Ilese; Odomolasa Village; Army Barracks II; Esepa Frontage Suara's House
Ijebu North East	Oke-Eri/Ogbogbo	U. P. S. School Imowo; Wesley Pry. School Oke-Eri; Baale's House Irewon; Town Hall, Ogbogbo I; Town Hall, Ogbogbo II; Frontage Baale's House - Ijari; Igoya; Frontage Baale's House Iwesi
Ijebu North East	Erunwon	Ephiphany Pry. Sch. Erunwon; B. A. C. Odopotu; Frontage Baale's House Odo Aye; Frontage, Syndicate House Igbeba; Elerunwon's Palace; Secretariat Via Obogbo; Ogidi Health Centre; Ilefon
Ijebu Ode	Isoku/Ososa	Beside Co-Op Building; Emmanuel School I Italupe; Moslem School, Isoku; Front Of Talabi's House Olisa Street I; Imoru Road Junction; Oke-Ola Ilorin; Emmanuel School II; Front Of Talabi's House Olisa Street II
Ijebu Ode	Odo-Esa	Baptist Day School Ereko; Front Of Our Lady's School; Front Of Alhaji Kukoyi's House; Opposite Itajana Mosque; State Hospital; Dental Centre
Ijebu Ode	Itantebo	Moslem School Etitale I; Opp. Oloritun's House; Front Of Igboburo Mosque; Front Of Balogun Kuku's House; Isokun / Itaogbe Junction; Moselm School Etitale 11
Ijebu Ode	Ijade / Imepe I	Old Wasimi School Hall; Joke Taiwo Pry. School; Balogun Kuku Road; Otubu Memorial School; Iyanro Mosque; Oke Aje, Back Of Ajayi's House
Ijebu Ode	Ijade / Imepe II	Front Of Olisa's Palace; Old Ijada Market; Omoluwabi Pry. School Imepe; Moslem Pry. Sch. Imepe; U. N. A. Pry. Sch. Imepe; Orunse Area; Idomowo/Imose; Wasimi Pry School; Idele; Ayeru/Ajegunle; Ipamuren Mosque; Beside Ramdat Hotel, Oguntuga St I-Ode
Ijebu Ode	Porogun I	Muslem College; Opposite Apeloko; Opposite L. G. Works Dept; Beside Isasa Mosque; Christ Church School Molode; Ayegbami Wasimi Junction; Ojofa/Alapo Junction; Mobegelu St. (In front Olowu's House); Adeola Odutola College; Local Govt. Maternity Centre
Ijebu Ode	Porogun II	Front Of Babalola's House; Ijebu-Ode Grammar School; Christ Church Sch., Porogun; A. G. G. S. Obalende; Abeokuta Road Front Of Alowolodu; Ogbagba Street (Middle Front Of Alowonle; Italapo Mosque; Middle Alapo Street, (In front Of Mosque); Abeokuta Rd (In front Of Olufowobi's House)
Ijebu Ode	Ijasi/ Idepo	Our Saviour's Pry. School; Front Of Bata Shop; Wesley School; C. A. C. School Degun; Idepo Junction; Araromi/Iloro Junction; Odutola St. (Beside Odupele Street); Molipa (In front Ogo-Oluwa Bakery); Molipa High School; Odupele / Ogunyoku Junction; Osimore Junction
Ijebu Ode	Odo-Egbo/Oliworo	St. Augustine Catholic School; A. U. D. Pry. Sch. I, Bonojo; A. U. D. Pry. Sch. II Onirugba; Govt., Technical College; Ezekiel Awoyelu Junction; Beside Ijebu-Ode Stadium; Tai Solarin College Of Education; Old Odo Egbo Market; Ahmadiyya Mosque; K. Mansion; Igbeba / Elebute Junction; Bonjo / Odutola Street; Gra Off Awujale Street (Middle)
Ijebu Ode	Isiwo	Christ Church Pry. School - Isiwo; Ayeteju Maternity Òkòrògbín; Odo/Asoyin Pry. Sch.; Okelisa (Opposite New Mosque); Odo Lofa; St. Partick School Isiwo; Ansarudeen High Sch, Isiwo
Ijebu Ode	Itamapako	St. Alloysious Sch. Iloti; Odosengolu; Odo-Arewa Market; Okenla Tomoba Pry. Sch.; Local Government School Idale; St. Joseph Odonoko; St. Joseph School Odonoko; Oke-Ako; St. Anne's School, Irawo; Tomoba Village
Ikenne	Ikenne I	Ikenne Town Hall; Wesley Pry. School Ikenne; Eti-Obu Quarters Egunrege; Abiyi - Olowo; Moko Street; Eti, Obu Quarters; Idomole Square; Moro Street; Opp. Awolowo's House; Obafemi Awolowo Pry. School; Yawa Ikenne
Ikenne	Ikenne II	Customary Court; A. U. D. School Ikenne; Eti-Obu Quarters; Abuji-Olowo; Remo Plantation; Eti-Obu Quarters Mese; Itun Moko II; More Street; Community High School Ikenne; Christ Apostolic Church Oke-Igbala; Oke Magbon Junction Ikenne; Itun Epe Ikenne
Ikenne	Iperu I	African-Bethel Pry. School; Ita Osanyin; Iregun Street; Ita Oloku; Ayegbami Street; Imosan Street
Ikenne	Iperu II	Ita-Tisa; Salvation Army School Iperu; Jalugba Square; Ibu Road; Kanga Street; Akesan Market; Ajagbe High School; Opp. Agbomagbe's House
Ikenne	Iperu III	St. John's Cath. Pry. Sch.; Araromi/Mosalasi Sokoto; Ibadan Road; Wesley Pry. School; St. James School; A. U. D. School; Abule Egba Imaje; Opp. Police College; Christ Apostolic College; Idena Quarters
Ikenne	Ogere I	Cath. Pry. School; Ita Jiren Street Junction; Idomogun Square; Itunla Street; Obadore Square; Oke-Oja
Ikenne	Ogere II	Ajegunle; Wesley School; Town Hall; Lisa Taborah; Court Hall; Idaren Square; Ode Road
Ikenne	Ilisan I	Town Hall; A. U. D. School Ilisan; Opposite Post Office; Isanbi High School; Town Planning; African Bethel School; (Olofin) A. U. D.
Ikenne	Ilisan II	Customary Court; Wesley Pry. School; Bethel Church; Iwaye Compound; Ago Ilara Street; Ademo Abara; Aswa - Texgard Road; Opp. Bab Cock Gate
Ikenne	Ilisan/Irolu	A. U. D. Pry. School Irolu; Wesley Pry. Sch. - Irolu; Anglican Sch. Irolu; Town Hall; Ilisan-Irolu Road
Imeko/Afon	Imeko	Opp. Baptist Church; Front Of Onimeko Palace; Near Ajegunle Market; Near Watergate Agboje; Near Gelete Market; Baptist Pry. School; Near Igbo Olupe; Front Of Isale Bode; Ijusun Area; Beside Cashia Tree Butunbu; Opp. Cocoa Shop Igbo Olondo; I. A. L. G. Pry. Sch. Onijin; Igbo Ifa Quarters; Ita Lakosa; Ita Apogbere (Ishim); Ita Emilandu; Behind C. C. C. Imeko; Ita Agbagba Open Space Square; Sunwa Market; New Health Centre Area; Ojoloko Village
Imeko/Afon	Oke Agbede/Moriwi/Matale	C. P. S. Oke Agbede; Opp. Methodist Church; Near Market Square Wasimi Okuta; Opp. Baale House-Moriwi; C. N. F. Secretariat; Under Kimi Tree Abule Alarabakan; Near Market Square Ologede; Ita-Baale Matale; Near Mowodani Market; Ibogun Village; Oke-Ayo Village
Imeko/Afon	Idofa	Mango Tree Maternity Centre; Opp. Onidofa Palace; Near Ishin Tree; Oluwatedo Town Hall; I. A. L. G. Pry. School; Near Market Square Miofesu
Imeko/Afon	Iwoye/Jabata	R. C. M. Iwoye; Beside Motor Park; Ita Oba Iwoye; Beside Sabo Cow Market Iwoye; New Market Centre Jabata
Imeko/Afon	Ilara/Alagbe	R. C. M. School, Ilara; Meth. Pry. School Ilara; Ita Oba Square; Ita Ale Centre; Ita Sango; Ita Baale Alagbe; Ita Baale Ijumu Village; Open Space Opp. Samon's Central Mosq.; Comm. Primary Sch., Alagbe; Agbakula, Ijumu; Agbakula Pry. Sch. Agbakula
Imeko/Afon	Otapele	I. A. L. G. School Atapele Kajola Aderan Junction; C. P. S. Ibara; I. A. L. G. Baare Farinde; Baare/Kanji Junction; Falola Asipa Junction
Imeko/Afon	Kajola/Agberiodo	Near Market Kajola Apata; Near Market Square Obolo; Ita Baale Afako; Mango Tree, Abale Alli; I. A. L. G. Abule Peter/Near Market Oke Benbe; Ajebo Market; A/C Primary School Agberiodo; I. A. L. G. Ajiboro; Segile Ita Baale; Oyetedo Village.
Imeko/Afon	Olorunda/Gbomo	I. A. L. G. Agboro; Ita Baale Oloro Akinwale; Ita Baale Babalawo; Ita Baale Olorunda; I. A. L. G. Sesan; Kile Junction; Ita Baale Inawole Village
Imeko/Afon	Idi Ayin	I. A. L. G. Idi Ayin; Sabo Square Owode Mosafejo Square Owode; Ita Baale Ago-Kesan; I. A. L. G. Ojubu Latilewo; Pry. School Amore; Pry. School Alagbomeji; C. P. L. Owuwu; Near Market Obada
Ipokia	Ipokia I	Ipokia L. G. School; C. M. S. School Ipokia; U. A. M. C. Sch. Ipokia; Near Palace Square; Alafia Tayo Street; Baptist Day School Iwuku Yasi; Iwuku Igbodo; Apostolic School, Obanigbe; Town Hall Obanigbe Oke
Ipokia	Ipokia II	R. C. M. Onfo; I. P. L. G. School Onro; I. P. L. G Sch. Gbodoroju; A. U. D. Pry. Sch. Idimafun; I. P. L. G Sch. Iponran; I. P. L. G Sch. Onimowo; Booth At Odanpopo; Booth At Odanjaye
Ipokia	Agosasa	Maternity Centre Agosasa; R. C. M. School; Court Hall Idomafe; N. U. D. School Agosasa; Community High School Agosasa; Odesan - West; Near Central Mosque Agosasa; Idata - Idotun; Idolorisa; Ipokia Local Government School Ago - Egun; U. P. S. School Ibatefin; Ibatefin Clinic; Ibatefin Town Hall; Adamaye; Aseko Village; Idotun; Idama Village; Agosasa Customary Court, Ita-Igboku; Asunara; Fakejo; Kajola; Motor Park Agosasa; In front Of Onimalu; Idabata
Ipokia	Ijofin/Idosa	I. P. L. G. School - Ijofin; Methodist School Ijofin; I. P. L. G. School Tongeji Island; Idowe Town Hall; Bapt. School Ita - Onimasa; Oke Asa Square; I. P. L. G. School - Ilepa; Kosomi Square; Arigo Square; I. P;L. G. School Idosemo; I. P. L. G. School Idosa; Gbao Town Hall; Kate Square; I. P. L. G. School Bode Ase; Vatipa Square; I. P. L. G. School Idopetu; Isii Square; Ita Odojigan; Ilufe; Opp. Onijofin Palace; Vatipa
Ipokia	Tube	I. P. L. G. School Tube; Maternity Centre Tube; Poe; Obalaja; C. P. S. Sch. Ibadan; Methodist School Ilesi; Afonji; Ovuu; Gboje; I. P. L. G. Modobilafon; Odepata; Igbo Asa; Ahoho-Isa
Ipokia	Agada	Methodist School Agada; Oja Agada; Ita Maguta; Community Pry. School Iguu; I. P. L. G. School Igade; Jihome; I. P. L. G. School Whekan; Awusa; Togbowhe
Ipokia	Mauni I	Anagunji; C. P. S. Ilero; Seje Town Hall; Hahame; I. P. L. G. School Maun; Aholome; Osibadan; Maun Maternity; Akere; Wheke Town Hall; C. P. S. Ahovo; Gbegotho; Igo/Onadilogun
Ipokia	Mauni II	I. P. L. G. School Ipinle; Agbojetho; Fanji; Okere; Night Market Agbogbe; Ajankome Town Hall; I. P. L. G. School Vawhe Tukuru; Methodist Sch. Ihundo; Vawhe Pevi; Araromi
Ipokia	Ajegunle	Near Ajegunle Mosque; Ajegunle Bus Stop; Near Baales House Iloupeju; Ilupeju Junction; A/C School Owotedo; Pry. School Ogosa; I. P. L. G. School Medeogosa; Agboku Junction; Mosafejo Junction; Idologan; Open Space Behind Jolaco Filling Station
Ipokia	Ifonyintedo	Maternity Centre Atan-Ota; Near Ega Compound; Baptist Day School Ifonyintedo; I. P. L. G. School Ifonyintedo; Near Bapt. Church Isale-Odo; C. M. S. School Saasa; Near C & S Ibola; Near Methodist Church - Ita Ege; Near Central Mosque - Madoga; Bapt. Day School Madoga; Near Bapt. Church Ilagbe; I. P. L. G. Iropo; Comm. School - Imule; Baptist Day School- Alaari; Near C. A. C. Church - Alaari; Community Pry. School - Koko; U. A. M. C. Wasimi Ikorodu; Community Pry. Sch. Asipa; Near Baptist Church Afuye; Near C. M. S. Church Idomogun; Near Baptist Church - Iledu; Onireke Junction - Koko; Near C. C. C. Isale Koko; Near Central Mosque Ita Yaro, Ifoyintedo; Mat. Centre, Isadan Igbo-Agan; Beside C. A. C. Church Idi-Omo Quarters; I. P. L. G School Kajola
Ipokia	Idiroko	Babaloke; Mechanic Workshop; Near Balogun Ibirinde; Near Police Station; I. P. L. G School Idiroko; Aferiku; Oniko Palace I; Customary Court Hall; I. P. L. G School Ikolaje; Etikoto; Near A. U. D Agbabo; Eselu/Deeper Life; Mayowa Area; Oniko Palace II
Ipokia	Ihunbo/ Ilase	St John's Sch, Ihunbo; Court Hall, Ihunbo; R. C. M Ita Egbe; I. P. L. G Sch, Ayetoro; Near Palace Ilase; Booth At Okere; I. P. L. G Sch, Ilase; Near Idoforo Church; Pry Sch, Iganmi; Near Baptist Church Onigbedu; Baptist Day Sch, Igboredo; Near C. A. C Oko Eye; Oke Ojumo Comm. Pry Sch Adodo; Igboso Village Ihunbo; Near C. A. C Ojolowo Ihunbo; Batter Life Market - Idi-Opamu; Akinsola Fagbohun
Obafemi/Owode	Mokoloki	A/C School - Mokoloki; Village Square Eleworo; O. O. L. G School, Imo-Ijiwo; O. O. L. G School, Iro; O. O. L. G School, Iyedi Balogun; Front Of Maternity Centre; O. O. L. G. School, Ajambata; A/C School, Obanlado
Obafemi/Owode	Ofada	O. O. L. G. School, Magbon Etido; O. O. L. G. School, Abaren; St. David School, Ofada I; St. David School, Ofada II; St. David School, Ofada III; A/C School, Oko Araferin; O. O. L. G. School, Ibafo I; O. O. L. G. School, Ibafo II; O. O. L. G. School, Ibafo III; O. O. L. G. School, Magboro; O. O. L. G. School, Arepo; O. O. L. G. School, Orimerunmu I; O. O. L. G. School, Orimerunmu; O. O. L. G. School, Mowe I; O. O. L. G. School, Mowe II; O. O. L. G. School, Pakuro; Opp. Redemption Camp; O. O. L. G. School, Arigbawonwo; O. O. L. G. School, Asese; Booth At Akinola's Square Pakuro
Obafemi/Owode	Owode	All Saints School I -Owode I; All Saints School I, Owode II; All Saints School I, Owode III; All Saints School II, Owode I; All Saints School II, Owode II; Market Stall, Geleodun; A/C School Akinbo; A. U. D. School Someke; O. O. L. G. School, Olowokojebi; A/C School, Orile-Igbein I; A/C School, Orile-Igbein II; A/C School, Iboku Aro; O. O. L. G. School, Korisa; Front Of Disp. Isale Owode I; Front Of Disp. Isale Owode II; Sogoye Square Owode; St. Mich. Ang. School, Lufuwape I; St. Mich. Ang. School, Lufuwape II; Fornt Of Eleshin's House Eguru; N. U. D School Owode; African Church Ogidan; Owode High Sch., Owode
Obafemi/Owode	Ajura	St. Peters School, Siun I; St. Peters School, Siun II; St. John School, Ajura I; St. John School, Ajura II; A/C School, Otunba; Comm. Sch, Orita Ijaye I; Comm. Sch, Orita Ijaye II; St. Peter Ang. Sch. Ikanna Balogun I; St. Peter Ang. Sch, Ikanna Balogun II; St. Peters Sch., Awo Apena; N. U. D. School, Orile - Imo I; N. U. D. School, Orile - Imo II; Eredo Alase Village Square; O. O. L. G. School, Potoki; Ang. School, Semore I; Ang. School, Semore II; Seriki; Ikanna Oluwo
Obafemi/Owode	Moloko-Asipa	United Ang. School, Moloko - Asipa I; United Ang. School, Moloko - Asipa II; O. O. L. G. School, Oba Seriki; Araromi Market, Asu; Community Hall, Kobape; O. O. L. G. School, Mogbafofo; A/C School, Osiki; R. C. M. School, Idowu Ofonran; O. O. L. G. School, Aro-Ere; Ang. Pry. School, Onipepeye; N. U. D. Pry. Sch. Magbagbodun; Imo Emulu; Okusan Village; Libegun Village
Obafemi/Owode	Onidundu	Christ Ang. Sch., Afojupanla; A/C School, Soseri; Front Of Maternity Centre, Onidundu; Village Square, Sowunmi; A/C School, Orogbo - Lamodi; A/C School, Laloko; O. O. L. G. School, Ogbe, Odujoko; A/C School, Musin Ore; O. O. L. G. School, Ajana - Liyebi; Ijemo Lusi (School); Akisan; Omun; Erinfunoke
Obafemi/Owode	Kajola	St. Peter A/C School, Ajibayo; Methodist School Oyero, Ikosofe; St. James School, Kajola; O. O. L. G. School, Idi Osan; Ang. School, Kuti; Ang. School, Odo-Ijesa; Ang. School, Aberu Agba I; Ang. School, Aberu Agba II; Pry. School, Isan-Onigbagbo; Alapako Village; Soonu Village
Obafemi/Owode	Obafemi	Central School, Obafemi I; Central School, Obafemi II; Front Of Dispensary, Igbari - Ake; Ang. Sch. Alaha I; Ang. Sch. Alaha II; St. Peters Ang. Sch., Ilogbo-Olofin; O. O. L. G. School, Apena Erunbe; St. Theresa R. C. M. School, Gbure; Village Square, Agborun; O. O. L. G. School, Baase Iporo; Front Of Maternity Centre, Apena- Ake; N. U. D. School, Igbedu
Obafemi/Owode	Ajebo	Ajebo High School, Ajebo I; Ajebo High School, Ajebo II; St. John Sch. Owojo I; St. John Sch. Owojo II; Market Square, Fidiwo; N. U. D. School, Oluwo-Ifote; St. Peter Sch, Abatan; O. O. L. G. School, Oyebola; St. James School, Akinola; Bapt School, Erinle; C & C School, Olugbo Odeyemi; Ang. Sch, Itoko-Apata
Obafemi/Owode	Alapako-Oni	St. Peter's Ang. School, Alapako-Oni; St. Paul Ang. School, Abujana; Ang. School, Seriki-Sotayo; O. O. L. G. School, Ogunmakin I; O. O. L. G. School, Ogunmakin II; O. O. L. G. School, Imolisa; United Pry. School Boodo I; United Pry. School Boodo II; O. O. L. G. School, Akindele; Abule Ogunmakin ( Sowunmi); Ladijo - Pry Sch
Odeda	Odeda	Odeda Market I; Odeda Market II; Ika Aina Titun Village; Rogun Pry. School; Ogijan Village; Ogboye Pry. School; Aralamo Village; Olugbo Market; Ile-Olu, Pry. School; Baale Ogunbayo; Oluga Pry. School; Arege Pry. School; Sanyaolu Olobe; Ilagbe Village
Odeda	Balogun Itesi	Toba Pry. School; Obelu Village; Segile Village; Aderu Pry, School; Apena Kemta; Emulu; Papa Oja; Ode Laitan Pry. School
Odeda	Olodo	Maternity Centre Olodo; All Saints Pry. School, Otere, Ikereku; Obo Ogunsola Village; Otere Ogunkola Village; Oju Ogun Pry. School; Ikija Village; Baagbon Pry. School; Afojuowo Village; Adepegba Village; Agbe Pry. School; Mogan Pry. School; Bamgbose Village
Odeda	Alagbagba	C. A. C. Pry. School, Alagbagba; Abule, Ola Pry. School; Babapupa. Pry. School; Ogundipe Vollage; Owu Village; Ijemo Fadipe, Pry. School I; Lerin Olorode; Amimiawo Village; Abakuyamo Village; Balogun Lanloko Village; Ojebiyi Village; Elegunmefa Village
Odeda	Ilugun	St. James Pry. Sch. I, Ilugun; Olofin Pry School; St. Andrews Pry Sch. I, Kila; Okiri Ojule Pry. School; Kugba Ajagbe Pry. School; Akonko Pry School; Akintoye Pry. School; Onireke Village; Olowo Village; Alagba Village; Olokemeji Pry. School I; Adewusi Pry. School; O. L. G. Pry. School, Efon Adanri; Daodu Village; Olosan Village; Oguntolu Pry School, Itoko Fadipe
Odeda	Osiele	St. Mary's Pry. Sch., I, Osiele; St. Mary's Pry. Sch., II, Osiele; Camp Village; Apakila Village; Idi-Aka Village; C. P. S. Iwo Alli; Ogboja Pry. School; O. L. G. Itesi Ajegunle I; Jagun Akinfenwa
Odeda	Obantoko	O. L. G. School I, Obantoko I; O. L. G. School I, Obantoko II; N. U. D. Gram School, Obantoko; Akingbade Village; Anigilaje Village; Aaya Pry. School; Ayetoro Budo; Isolu Village; Ajegunle Farm Settlement; Ilugun Itoko; Ilupeju Alagbede; O. L. G. Obantoko School II(Morekete); Ahmadiyya Egbatedo School; Booth At Alogi Bus Stop
Odeda	Alabata	O. L. G. Pry. School, Alabata; Okiji/Malaka; Balogun Agurodo; Adao Village; Tejeoun Village; Faami Village; Onsemo
Odeda	Obete	Obete Akanbi Pry. School I; Apojola Pry. School; Mologede Village; Abule Set Pry. School; Sanusi Village; Luhani Village; Okedi Village; Ayoyo Village; Alamutu; Itesi Lijigun [Apojola Pry. Sch. II]
Odeda	Opeji	O. L. G. School I, Opeji; O. L. G. School I, Mawuko; O. L. G. School, Baale Oya; O. L. G. School, Adako; Bode Olude I; Fadage; Ijo-Agbe Village; O. L. G. Pry School, Onigbagbo; Laba - Olorin; Elegbaada Village; Booth Opp. Alhaji Fasiu's House, Bode - Olude; Bode Olude II
Odogbolu	Imosan	St. Peters Primary School, Imosan; St. Peter School Imosan; Ajeregun Road, Front Eba Tutu House, Iperin; Odoyanta
Odogbolu	Imodi	Recretation Center, Imodi; St. Mattew Pry. Sch.; Opp. Ikangba Church; Christ Ang Pry. Sch. Agoro; Opp. St. John Church, Erinlu; Market Square, Imodi; Moslem Pry. Sch. Imodi; Black And White Hotel; Recretation Center II; Opp. Ikangba Church II; Opp. St. John Church, II
Odogbolu	Okun-Owa	St Philip's Pry Sch, Okun Owa; Moslem Pry. School, Okun Owa; Okun Owa Town Hall; St. Judes Pry. School, Ijesha Ijebu; St. Peter's School, Araromi Ake; Viewing Centre Ijesha, Ijebu; St. Bana Bas Okun Owa; Booth Opp Otunba Olukoye's Comp.; Comp. High Sch Okun Owa (Gate)
Odogbolu	Odogbolu I	Odo Market; Itun Oriwu; Ikosa Road, Frontage Adeyemi House; Itun Agbon; Igbepa/Opposite, St. Paul Church; Odi Tami; Sabo Market; Odo Aloro; St. Mary Pry. Sch. Ogoji
Odogbolu	Odogbolu II	Itun Oke Quarters; Federal Govt. College, Odogbolu; Itun Isoku (Beside Olorunfunmi House); Ubu Quartetrs; Odogbon Quarters; Iloda Quarters; Efiyan, (Frontage 1st Choice Photo); Idena
Odogbolu	Aiyepe	Opposite Aba Central, Mosque Aiyepe; Idobiri Market Aiyepe; Holy Trinity Pry Sch. Aiyepe; Opposite Market Odolowu, Mosque Aiyepe; Opposite Ilakan Mosque; St. Paul School, Eyinwa; Market Square, Aba Aiyepe; Frontage Bada House Agbowa Road
Odogbolu	Ososa	Obalufon Idomowo Square, Ososa; Catholic Sch. Ososa; Ososa Town Hall; Ososa Market/Dispensary; Opposite Ijoku Mosque Ososa; St. John School Ososa; Sabo Market
Odogbolu	Idowa	Town Hall (Idowa Front); Iloye Maternity, Idowa; Town Hall, Idowa (Back); Opp. Chief Olu Adebanjo's House (Booth)
Odogbolu	Ibefun	Araromi Ibefun Water Works; Owode Quarters, (Frontage) Osipitan's House) Ibefun; Catholic Pry. Sch. Ibefun; Oketun Ibefun; Frontage Of Maternity Centre, (Isale Ibefun); Market Square Ibefun
Odogbolu	Ilado	Infornt Of Ilado Social Club Sibadewa Ilado; St. Luke Pry. School Imodi, Ijasi; Odonselu Market; Aba Tiwa/Aba Soobo; Akio
Odogbolu	Ogbo/Moraika/Ita-Epo I	Imoru, Opposite Imoru Church; Mobalufon Town Hall; Adefisan; Atiba, St. James Pry. Sch. Atiba; Town Hall, Egbe; United Pry. Sch. Oke Owa; Opposite Odo Epo Church; Imagbon Station; Federal Housing Estate Ikoto; In front Of Bale House, Latogun; In front Of Olu Of Oregu's House Araromi Oregun; Market Square, Imaka; Opposite Church, Emuren; Lumodan Imagbon
Odogbolu	Ala/Igbile	Opposite Aluko Mosque, Aka; Town Hall Ala, Front; Frontage Maternity, Ilofa/Iwaye Igbile; Sifolu/Owode Igbile; In front Of Olorilu's House Oke-Orundun; Araromi Square Ala; Town Hall, All Back
Odogbolu	Jobore/Ibido/Ikise	St. Michael Pry. School, Jobore; Olorunsogo Town Hall, Ibido; Frontage James House, Ikise
Odogbolu	Omu	Z. I. Pry. School Oke, Oyinbo Omu; U. N. A. Pry. School, Omu; Saint Paul School, Omu; Opposite Mota Mosque, Omu; Frontage Olisa House, Omu; Opposite Irete Mosque; Beside Ita Ale Market, Omu; Frontage Ogunlana House, Degorunse; Igbodile/Ayegbami, Omu; Frontage Onaniyi's House, Omu
Odogbolu	Ogbo/Moraika/Ita Epo II	Imaweje Town Hall; Opposite Church, Idagbo; Opposite Ibido, Ogbo Church; Tasce Ijagun Bus-Stop; Isanya Ogbo Maternity; Market Square Okelamuren; Abapawa
Ogun Water Side	Iwopin	L. G. School, Iwopin; St. Mary's Pry. School, Oloju Meta; Fisheries Office, Ehindi; L. G. School, Imosiri; Ebute Ilamo Square; I. P. R. C. Pry. School, Iwopin; L. G. School, Imekre; Town Hall, Iwopin
Ogun Water Side	Oni	L. G Sch, Oni I; L. G Sch. Oni II; St Peter's Pry Sch, Ologbun; L. G Sch, Akila; Orita Omo Square; L. G Sch, Alo; St Peters Pry Sch, Oriyanrin; Demolu Quarters, Oni; Maternity Centre, Oni; Open Space Opp, Balogun Bello's House; Open Space Opp. Awonuga's House
Ogun Water Side	Ibiade	Tebuwo Square; St. Mich. Pry School, Ibiade; Toso Square; Togbunri Square; Tayoku Square; Tipetu Square; L. G. School, Ibiade I; L. G. School, Ibiade II; Araromi Quarters; L. G. School Farm Settlement; (Open Space) Zion Ibiade; Open Space Opp. Odulaja's House; Health Centre, Ibiade (Gen. Hospital Road)
Ogun Water Side	Lukogbe/Ilusin	L. G. School Lukogbe I; L. G. School Lukogbe II; Itun Melekun Lokula; L. G. School Ilusin I; L. G. School Ilusin II; Ilusin Zion; F. S. P. Market Agbure; L. G. School Arafin; Labour Camp; St. John's Pry. Sch. Agodo; Labour Camp I; Labour Camp II; Labour Camp III; Apatal Oduni Junction; Bagbe Camp
Ogun Water Side	Abigi	Moslem Pay School Abigi I; Moslem Pay School Abigi II; St. Thomas Pry. School I Abigi; St. Thomas Pry. School II Abigi; Market Square Square Abigi I; Market Square Abigi II; L. G. School Ita-Ogun; Itatikeli Junction; L. G. School, Ita-Out; Igbafo I; Igbafo II; Npc Office Abigi; Ayegbami Quarters; Pelebe At Oko-Igbo
Ogun Water Side	Efire	Ile-Ona Near Mosque; Ifelo Dun United Pry. School; Ona Eri Quarter's; Ubiku Camp; L. G. School Bolounduro; Calabar Camp I; Calabar Camp II; Aje Bamidele; Onada Square; Leren Camp; Sunbare's Camp [Jeremiah]
Ogun Water Side	Ayede/Lomiro	R. C. M. School, Ayede; St. Luke's School, Luwodo; St. Paul's School, Iyodan; St. John's School, Ajegunle; C. M. S School, Lomiro; Health Centre, Lofoluwa; L. G. School, Idobilayo; L. G. School, Ipai Kemore; Olola Camp; St. Mich. Pry School, Ligun; Lapeti Baale's Quarters
Ogun Water Side	Ayila/Itebu	St. Phillip's Pry. School; St. John's Pry. School, Ayila I; St. John's Pry Sch, Ayila II; St. Joseph R. C. M. School, Ayila; St. David Pry. School, Aye Tumare; St. Marks School, Itebu; Doluke Quarters; Ago-Ajaye Quarters
Ogun Water Side	Makun/Irokun	L. G. School, Makun Omi; Moha Village Square; L. G. School, Eba; L. G. School, Irokun; L. G. School, Igbo-Edu; L. G. School, Irokun II; Maternity Centre, Makun-Omi; Ariyan Village Square; Aseph Camp Igbo-Edu I; Aseph Camp Igbo-Edu II; Near Chief Tayo Ajayi's House, Makun
Ogun Water Side	Ode-Omi	L. G. School, Ode-Omi I; L. G. School, Igbosere; L. G. School, Awodikora; L. G. School, Okun Ilete; L. G. School Okun Elefon; Rice Mill, Bariken; Okun Isekun; Open Space At Ilete; Open Space At Igbesere
Remo North	Ayegbami	Ago Aro Junction I; Ago Aro Junction II; Idi-Aba; St. Peters School; All Well (At Omo Olowo) I; All Well (At Omo Olowo) II; Araromi Midway I; Araromi Midway II; Lemo (At Itale); Alagomeji; Ifepe Mid-Way; Ayegbami (Tokotaya); Isara (Olopomewa); Motoye; Eredo; Sarepawo
Remo North	Igan/Ajina	Oliwo Junction I; Oliwo Junction II; Ajina Square I; Ajina Square II; Ijabata I; Ijabata II; Ijabata III; Ita Poke; Ago Aro; Majaako; Majaako's Palace; Ile Awo Opp. Gen. Hospital; Ita Olimo; Erinla Midway; Poke; Madoga
Remo North	Moborode/Oke-Ola	Oke Ola, Mid Way I; Oke Ola, Mid Way II; A. U. D. School, Isara I; A. U. D. School, Isara II; Wesley School, Isara I; Wesley School, Isara II; Obalende Junction; Idi-Obi; Imorisa Mid-Way
Remo North	Odofin/Imagbo/Petekun/Dawara	L. G. School Odo I; L. G. School Odo II; L. G. School Jowoje; L. G. School Gbasemo; L. G. School Imagbon; L. G. School, Eluju; Oloparun Village Square; Egunfoye Village Square I; Egunfoye Village Square II; Lagban Pry. School; Iresi Village; Peteku Lisa Village II; Peteku Lisa Village III; Deyoruwa; Dawara; Opekere; Alagbe; Oliwo
Remo North	Akaka	United School, Akaka I; United School, Akaka II; Afonlade I; Afonlade II; Salu Village Square; United School, Ake Amure; Maternity Centre Akaka; Agorigo; Aboro; Abeayika; Abule Balogun
Remo North	Ipara	Market Square Ipara I; Market Square Ipara II; Local Govt. Sch. Ipara I; Local Govt. Sch. Ipara II; United Sch. Ipara I; United Sch. Ipara II; Abule Sonoyi; Ayegbami I; Ayegbami II
Remo North	Orile-Oko	Anglican School, Isan; L. G. School, Okodelokun; L. G. School, Atoba; United Hall Azana; Ajegunle Village Square; Araromi Market; Ogunmuyiwa Village; Kajola Village; Oliwo Village, Village Square
Sagamu	Oko/Epe/Itula I	Open Space At Sagamu Round About; Wesley School, Oko I; Wesley School, Oko II; Open Space At Old Oja Ale Epe I; Open Space Near Nursery School Ejiiro I; Soyindo Wesley School I; A. U. D. School Oko I
Sagamu	Oko/Epe/Itula II	Open Space Near Alado; Owonifaris House Opposite I; St. Collumcile School I; Open Space K & S Oriokuta; Open Space At Degorunsen Junction I; Open Space At Degorunsen Upper; Open Space At Iga Losi/Akarigbo; Open Space At Ajina/Isokun St. Junction; Open Space Near K & S Church; Open Space Opp. Lowa Ibu; Open Space Opposite Ipoji; Open Space At Mabadeje Junction I
Sagamu	Ayegbami/Ijokun	Open Space Beside Odekun; Open Space Beside Jebe; Open Space Near Oloko; Open Space At Kamiyo Street; Open Space At Sode; Open Space Near Awosanya; St. Paul's School Ijokun; Open Space Near Old Garage Ijokun
Sagamu	Sabo 1	Open Space At Johnson Ogunsola; Open Space At Dan-Tajira I; Open Space At Dan-Tajira Upper; Open Space Opposite Olori Ilu; Open Space Beside Oluwakemi; Open Space At Gbasemo Street; Open Space At Buraimo Street; Open Space Opposite Mercy Hospital; Open Space Near G. R. A. Beginning I; Open Space At Mosinmi; Open Space At Okulaja Street; Open Space Near Mrs Okubote House; Open Space Near Jubril Balogun; Open Space At Kaara Trailer Park I; Open Space At Fakoya Street; Opposite Star-Light
Sagamu	Sabo II	Open Space Opposite Kings Crown Hotel; Open Space Near Seriki; L. G School I Sabo I; Open Space Near Agura Road Upper; Market Square Ode-Lemo Road I; Open Space Near Agura Road End; Opp. Nursery School Odujoko I; Open Space At Sode Lane; Muslim High School I; Open Space Near Temidire School; Open Space At Odi Olowo / Akarigbo Street; Open Space At Onigbale Street; Remo Divisional High School I; Bucknors House By Nepa I; Open Space At Taiwo Goriola; Open Space Near Agura Road Middle,(Igbelefun)
Sagamu	Isokun / Oyebajo	Open Space Near Agolo; St. Paul's School Alagbo; Open Space At Alagbonmefa I; Ranikan Quarters I; Open Space At Iraye Street; Methodist College I; Open Space At Ogunlana Araromi Junction I; Ajegunle / Akaringbo Street
Sagamu	Ijagba	L. G. School I; L. G. School II; Open Space Opposite Of Ile- Ifa; Open Space Near Afinju Babalawo Street; Open Space Near Legunsen Palace; Onijagbas Palace; Open Space At Ita Ijagba Junction; Onirere Opposite No. 30
Sagamu	Latawa	Open Space At Latawa Palace I; Open Space Near Ogunmekun Street; Open Space At Latawa Square I; Open Space Near Araromi; Open Space Near Mechanic Site /Kajola; U. A. M. C. Eleja I; U. A. M. C. Eleja II; Open Space At Bolaji Street Ajegunle
Sagamu	Ode -Lemo	St. John's Pry. School Ode - Lemo; Open Space Near Lemo; Open Space Near Baba Ijo; A. U. D. School Ode - Lemo I; A. U. D. School Ode - Lemo II; Open Space At Ile - Aje Market Ode; Open Space Ita Merin Square; St. Paul's School Igbololo; St. Paul's School Emuren I; Itun Elemuren Street I; Open Space At Market Square I; Open Space At Emuren Market Square II
Sagamu	Ogijo/ Likosi	St . Paul's School Igbode; Open Space At Osigboyede Village I; St. Michael R. C. M. Fakale; U. A. M. C. School Iraye; St. Francis School Igbosoro; St. John School Ogijo I; St. John School Ogijo II; Open Space At Lisa's House; Wesley School Erefun; Open Space Opposite Catholic Abafon; L. G School Igbaga; Mosimi Village; L. G. School Ita - Merin; A. U. D. School Imushin - Ogijo; Eyin Egbe Village; Wesley School Sotunbo; C. A. C. School Ogijo I; Ewu Oloja Primary School; L. G School Ajaregun I
Sagamu	Surulere	Wesley School Makun I; Z. I. School Makun I; Open Space At Akorede Midway; Open Space At Akorede Upper; A. U. D. School Makun; Sokoya Memorial School I; Open Space At Akorede Lower; Akorede Junction
Sagamu	Isote	Open Space Opp Daodu's House I; Open Space Opp. Agbon Oluwatedo; Open Space At Radelu Isote Junction; Open Space At Ewusi House; Open Space At Isote Street Midway; Open Space At Oyekan House; Open Space At Odiolowo/ Olukokun; Open Space At Osisanya St. Midway
Sagamu	Simawa / Iwelepe	St. Paul's School Simawe; Open Space At Ewu Boun; Open Space At Alawuin Village; St Paul's School Iwelepe; Open Space At Oyeleke Settlement; L. G. School Kamiyi; St. Paul's School Ayetoro; St. Paul's School Oke -Ate; Open Space At Ewu Osi; L. G. Agunfoye; Open Space At Ewu Dodo; Open Space At Egbejoda /Araromi Junction; Open Space At Asunora; Open Space At Ewu Bale; Open Space At Mechanic Village; Open Space At Ewu Boun II
Sagamu	Ibido/Ituwa/Alara	Town Hall I; Open Space At Osoribiya Court; Open Space At Agbowa; Open Space At Iraye Upper; Open Space At Iraye Lower; Open Space At Itun Alara; Open Space At Ibido Square

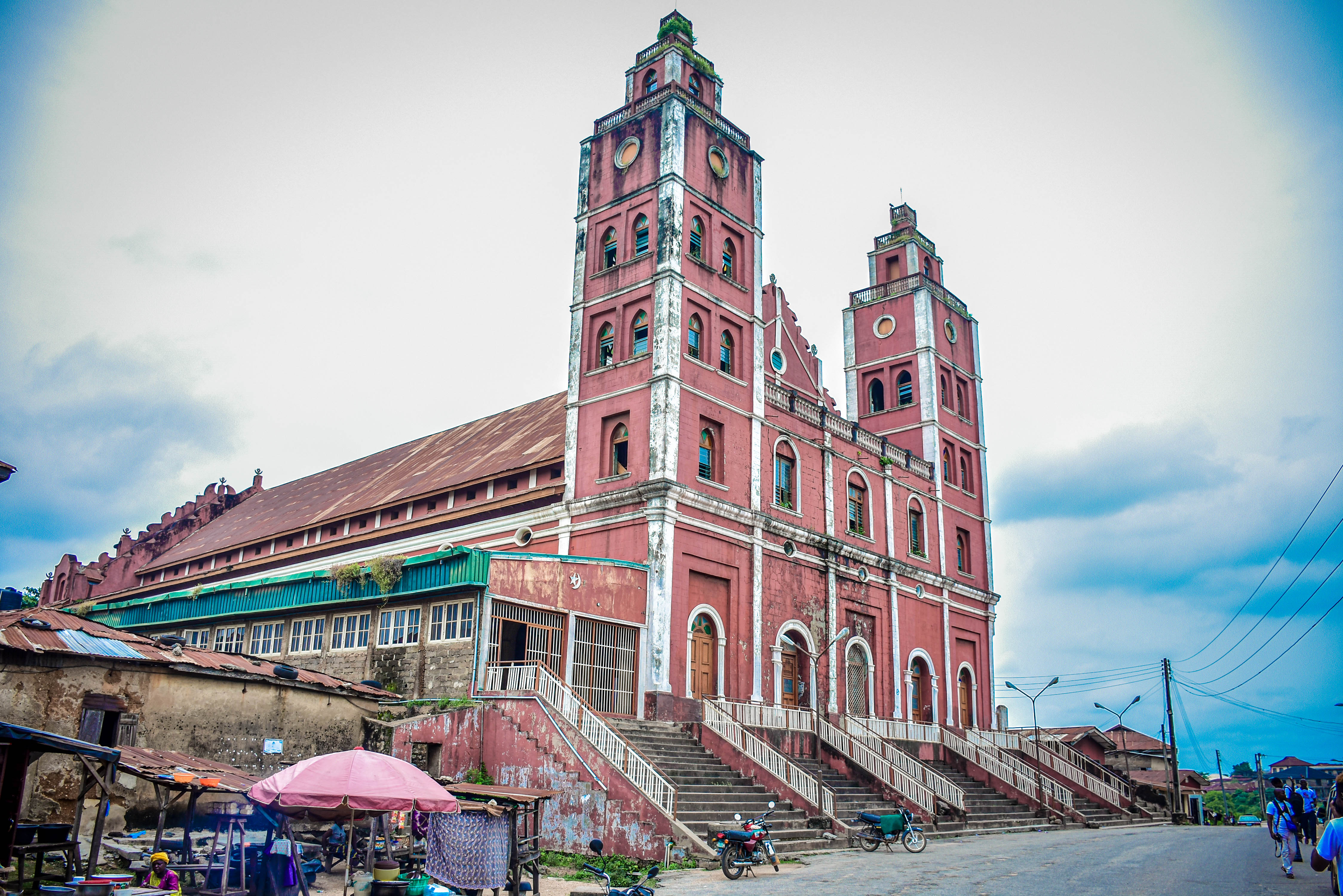
Kobiti Central Mosque
