= Deputy governor of Ogun State =

Second highest-ranking official in the executive branch of Ogun State in Nigeria

Deputy Governor of Ogun State
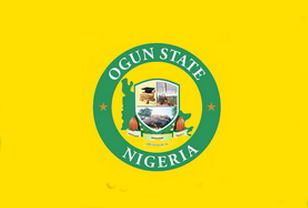
- Flag of Ogun State

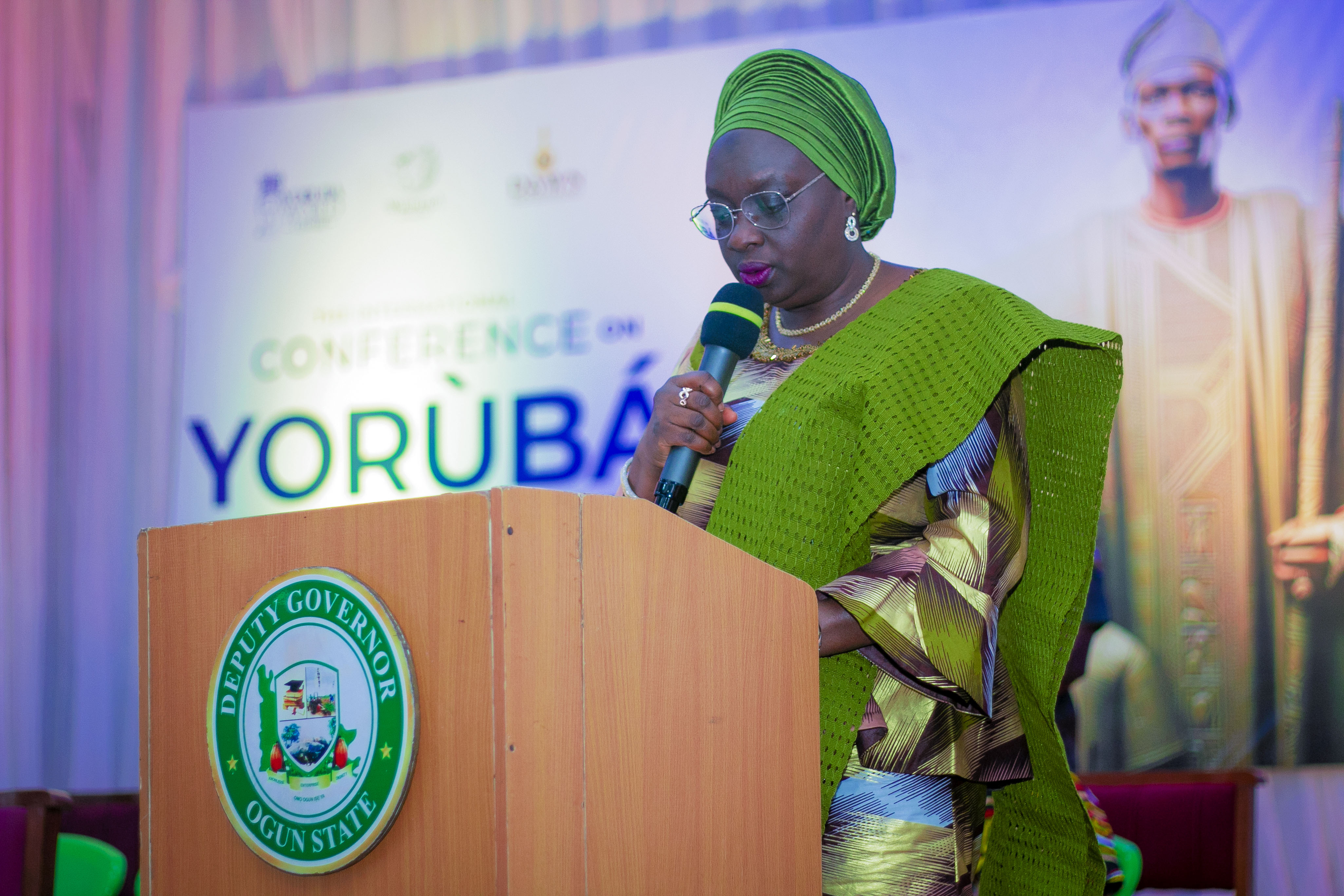
- Incumbent; Noimot Salako-Oyedele since 29 May 2019
- Executive Branch of the Ogun State Government
- Style: Deputy Governor (informal); Her Excellency (courtesy)
- Status: Second highest executive branch officer
- Member of: Ogun State Executive Branch; Ogun State Cabinet
- Seat: Abeokuta
- Nominator: Gubernatorial candidate
- Appointer: Direct popular election or, if vacant, Governor via House of Assembly confirmation
- Term length: Four years renewable once
- Constituting instrument: Constitution of Nigeria
- Inaugural holder: Sefiu Adegbenga Kaka (Fourth Republic)
- Succession: First
- Website: ogunstate.gov.ng

The deputy governor of Ogun State is the second-highest officer in the executive branch of the government of Ogun State, Nigeria, after the governor of Ogun State, and ranks first in line of succession. The deputy governor is directly elected together with the governor to a four-year term of office.

Noimot Salako-Oyedele is the current deputy governor, having assumed office on 29 May 2019.

== Responsibilities ==
The deputy governor assists the governor in exercising primary assignments and is also eligible to replace a dead, impeached, absent or ill Governor as required by the 1999 Constitution of Nigeria.

== List of deputy governors ==
| Name | Took office | Left office | Time in office | Party | Elected | Governor |
|---|---|---|---|---|---|---|
| Sesan Soluade (1933–2013) | 1 October 1979 | 31 December 1983 | 4 years, 91 days | Unity Party of Nigeria | 1979; 1983 | Olabisi Onabanjo |
| Abdul Rafiu Ogunleye (1940–2019) | 2 January 1992 | 17 November 1993 | 1 year, 319 days | Social Democratic Party | 1991 | Olusegun Osoba |
| Sefiu Adegbenga Kaka (born 1952) | 29 May 1999 | 29 May 2003 | 4 years | Alliance for Democracy | 1999 | Olusegun Osoba |
| Salimot Badru (born 1957) | 29 May 2003 | 29 May 2011 | 8 years | Peoples Democratic Party | 2003; 2007 | Gbenga Daniel |
| Segun Adesegun | 29 May 2011 | 29 May 2015 | 4 years | All Progressives Congress | 2011 | Ibikunle Amosun |
| Yetunde Onanuga (born 1960) | 29 May 2015 | 29 May 2019 | 4 years | All Progressives Congress | 2015 | Ibikunle Amosun |
| Noimot Salako-Oyedele (born 1966) | 29 May 2019 | Incumbent | 7 years, 101 days | All Progressives Congress | 2019; 2023 | Dapo Abiodun |

== See also ==
- List of governors of Ogun State
