= Government of Ogun State =

State in Nigeria

- Formation: 1976 (50 years ago)
- Jurisdiction: Ogun State
- Website: ogunstate.gov.ng

Legislative branch
- Legislature: House of Assembly
- Meeting place: House of Assembly Complex

Executive branch
- Leader: Governor of Ogun State
- Appointer: Direct popular vote
- Headquarters: Government House
- Main organ: Executive Council
- Departments: 21

Judicial branch
- Court: High Court
- Seat: Abeokuta

The Government of Ogun State consists of elected representatives and appointed officials responsible for the government of Ogun State, Nigeria. Ogun State has a population of about 2 million people, and is one of the 36 states that make up the Federal Republic of Nigeria. The state government is composed of the executive, legislative, and judicial branches, whose powers are vested by the Constitution in the Governor, the House of Assembly, and the High Court. The judiciary operates independently of the executive and the legislature. At the local level, elected officials are in charge of local government areas.

== Executive ==
The executive branch is headed by the Governor, assisted by the Deputy Governor, both of whom are elected. The Governor appoints the heads of parastatals, state-owned bodies, judicial officers, permanent secretaries and members of the Executive Council with the exception of the Deputy Governor. The Civil Service is administered by the head of service, a career civil servant, with each ministry managed by a permanent secretary. The commissioner is responsible for policy, while the permanent secretary provides continuity and is responsible for operations.

=== Governor ===
As the highest ranking official in the executive, the governor of Ogun State wields significant influence in matters relating to the governance of the state. As in most presidential systems, the governor is both the head of government and head of state. The governor is empowered by the Constitution to preside over the Executive Council, as well as to appoint, dismiss or reappoint its members–excluding the Deputy Governor–at will. In addition, the governor may sign legislation passed by the House into law or may veto it; however, if the governor does not make a decision to sign or veto a bill, the legislation automatically becomes law after 30 days.

A vote by a two-thirds majority in the House can overrule the governor. The same vote is required to initiate an impeachment process of the Governor or Deputy Governor. the Deputy Governor assumes the office of Acting Governor when the Governor is unable to discharge the duties of the office, until the governor resumes duty, or until election of a new one.

=== Deputy Governor ===
The position of Deputy Governor of Ogun State constitutes the vice-head of state and government. The position created when the federation returned to civilian authority under the Second Republic. Whoever holds the post is considered the second highest official in the executive branch. The deputy governor is also the first official in line to succeed the governor, should that office be vacated.

The deputy governor is elected concurrently on a ticket with the governor for a term of four years, renewable once. Noimot Salako-Oyedele, an engineer, is the current deputy governor. She was chosen by the governor Dapo Abiodun to be his running mate in the 2019 election.

=== Executive Council ===
The Executive Council is currently made up of:

Office	Incumbent
Governor	Dapo Abiodun
Deputy Governor	Noimot Salako-Oyedele
Attorney General and Commissioner for Justice	Mr. Gbolahan Adeniran
Commissioner for Information	Alhaji Abdulwaheed Odusile
Commissioner for Agriculture	Dr. Adeola Odedina
Commissioner for Budget and Economic Planning	Mr. Olaolu Olabimtan
Commissioner for Commerce and Industry	Mrs Kikelomo Longe
Commissioner for Community Development and Cooperatives	Hon. Ganiyu Hamzat
Commissioner for Culture and Tourism	Dr. Toyin Taiwo
Commissioner for Education, Science, and Technology	Abayomi Arigbabu
Commissioner for Environment	Hon. Abiodun Abudu Balogun
Commissioner for Finance	Mr Dapo Ogunbadejo
Commissioner for Forestry	Hon. Tunji Akinosi
Commissioner for Health	Dr. Tomi Coker
Commissioner for Housing	Mr. Jamiu Omoniyi
Commissioner for Local Government and Chieftaincy Affairs	Hon. Afolabi Afuape
Commissioner for Rural Development	Engr. Oludotun Taiwo
Commissioner for Special Duties and Inter-governmental Affairs	Barr. Femi Ogunbanwo
Commissioner for Transportation	Engr Gbenga Dairo
Commissioner for Urban and Physical Planning	TPL Tunji Odunlami
Commissioner for Women Affairs and Social Development	Mrs Funmi Efuwape
Commissioner for Works and Infrastructure	Engr. Ade Akinsanya
Commissioner for Youth and Sports	Dr. Kehinde Oluwadare

==== Special Advisers ====
Office	Incumbent
Senior Special Adviser for Political Matters	RT. Hon. Tunji Egbetokun
Special Adviser for Women Affairs & Social Development	Hon. Adijat Motunrayo Adeleye-Oladapo
Special Adviser for Bureau Lands & Survey	Hon. Aina Ololade Salami
Special Adviser for Environment	Ola Oresanya
Special Adviser for Works & Infrastructure	Engr Babatunde A. Adesina
Special Adviser for Government House	Babatunde Olaotan
Special Advisers for Information, Communication & Technology	Dayo Abiodun
Special Adviser for the Housing	Hon. Tajudeen Egunjobi
Special Adviser for Job Creation and Empowerment	Olalekan Olude
Special Adviser for Special Duties (Water)	Engr. Kunle Otun
Special Adviser for Security	AIG. Olushola Kamar Subair
Special Adviser for Education, Science & Technology	Ronke Soyombo
Special Adviser for OPIC	Arc. Abiodun Arole-Fari
Special Adviser for Communications	Hon. Remmy Hazzan
Special Adviser for Rural Development	Princess Peju Shote
Special Adviser for OGIRS	Hon. Adegbenga Adeshina
Special Adviser for OGIRS	Jide Sanwo
Special Adviser for Energy	Lolu Adubifa
Special Assistant on Information	Olalekan Osiade

== Legislature ==
The Ogun State House of Assembly is the unicameral legislative body of the state government. It was established in 1979 by part II, section 84, of the Constitution of Nigeria, which states, "There shall be a House of Assembly for each of the States of the Federation". Led by a Speaker, the House of Assembly consists of 26 members, each elected to four-year terms in single-member constituencies by plurality. Its primary responsibility is to create laws for the peace, order and effective government of the state.

=== Powers ===
There are numerous powers the Constitution expressly and specifically grants to the House of Assembly as they are necessary for its relevance. These include the powers to approve budget estimates presented to it by the executive; to make laws establishing the chargeable rates and the procedure to be used in assessing and collecting the rates charged by each local government council; to confirm gubernatorial appointments, oversee and monitor activities of government agencies, review policy implementation strategies of the executive, and summon before it and question a commissioner about the conduct of their ministry, especially when the affairs of that ministry are under consideration; and to initiate impeachment proceeding in order to secure the removal of the Governor or Deputy Governor.

=== Representatives ===
The legislature consists of elected representatives from each constituency. As of June 12, 2015, they were:

Constituency	Representative
Ifo I	Oluomo Olakunle Taiwo
Sagamu I	Mafe Adeyinka
Ijebu Ode	Alausa Olawale Hassan
Abeokuta South II	Olowofuja Idowu Nureni
Odogbolu	Adebowale Oladimeji Ojuri
Imeko-Afon	Akingbade Jemili
Ewekoro	Jolaoso Olujobi Israel
Obafemi Owode	Sanusi Tunde Wasiu
Ijebu North I	Solaja Bowale Olayinka
Ijebu East	Oyenuga Adejuwon Olufowobi
Ijebu North East	Otukoya Olujimi James
Abeokuta North	Ojodu Olayiwola Jamiu
Yewa North II	Oduntan Atanda Rasaq
Ijebu North II	Kadiri Dare
Ogun Waterside	Harrison Adeyemi
Ifo II	Ganiyu Alani Oyedeji
Abeokuta South I	Fasanya Victor Oludotun
Ado-odo Ota II	Bankole Olusola Akanbi
Yewa South	Akintayo Juliana Folakemi
Ado-odo Ota I	Aina Nurudeen Akinpelu
Remo North	Adeleye Adebiyi
Og I	Adekanbi-Sogbein,-Yetunde
Sagamu II	Soyebo Oluwasesan Mojeed
Ipokia	Adebowale Viwanu Ojo
Ikenne	Sonuga Samuel Olusola
Yewa North I	Suraj Adekunbi
Clerk of the House	Engineer Isiaka Bisiriyu

== Judiciary ==
The administration of justice in Ogun State is one of the fundamental duties of the judiciary of the state. This branch of government explains and applies the laws by hearing and eventually making decisions on various legal cases. It has a regulatory or supervisory body known as the Judicial Service Commission, which takes care of appointment, promotion and disciplinary issues of the judiciary.

The Chief Judge of Ogun State is the appointed head of the judicial branch. The Chief Judge is also the most senior judge and presiding member of the High Court of Justice. Among other responsibilities, the Chief Judge has the ceremonial duty of administering the oath of office of the Governor. In modern tradition, the Chief Judge retires voluntarily at sixty years of age, or statutorily at sixty-five years of age.

Most appointments to the judiciary are made by the Governor, but acting upon the recommendation of the National Judicial Council. At present, there are about 10 judicial divisions within the High Court of Justice, and about 26 judges carrying out their professional work.

== Local government ==
Local government areas handle local administration under an elected Chairman.

Ogun State is divided into twenty local government areas (LGAs).

== List of government agencies of Ogun State ==
=== The agencies of Ogun State consists of twenty (20) ministries and twenty seven (27) departments and they are as follows ===
Ministries	Departments & Agencies
Ministry of Budget and Planning	Ogun State Bureau of Information Technology
Ministry of Commerce and Industry	Ogun State Internal Revenue Services
Ministry of Agriculture	Ogun State Teaching Service Commission
Ministry of Urban and Physical Planning	Ogun State Urban and Regional Planning Board
Ministry of Works and Infrastructure	Ogun State Housing Corporation
Ministry of Information and Strategy	Office of The Auditor-General For Local Governments
Ministry of Environment	Bureau of Political Affairs and Administration
Ministry of Youth Development, Sports and Employment Generation	Bureau of Transportation
Ministry of Community Development & Corporative	Bureau of Service Matters, Office of Head of Service
Ministry of Women Affairs and Social Development	Bureau of Lands and Survey
Ministry of Local Government and Chieftaincy Affairs	Bureau of State Pensions
Ministry of Regional Integration	Ogun State Christian Pilgrims Welfare Board
Ministry of Justice	Ogun State Local Government Service Commission
Ministry of Health	Ogun State Muslim Pilgrims Welfare Board
Ministry of Special Duties and Inter-Governmental Affairs	Ogun State Primary Health Care Development Board
Ministry of Housing	Ogun State Hospital Management Board
Ministry of Forestry	Ogun State Office for Trade and Investment
Ministry of Culture and Tourism	Office of The Chief Registrar High Court Of Justice
Ministry of Education, Science and Technology	Ogun State House of Assembly
	Ogun State Civil Service Commission
	Ogun State Property and Investment Corporation
	Ogun State Universal Basic Education Board
	Bureau of Electrical Engineering Services
	Ogun State Traffic Compliance and Enforcement Corps (TRACE)
	Office of the Auditor - General, Ogun State
	Ogun State Health Insurance Agency
	Bureau of Statistics

== See also ==
- Nigerian National Assembly delegation from Ogun
