= Onanuga =

Onanuga is a surname of Nigerian origin. Notable people with the surname include:

- Adewunmi Onanuga (1965–2025), Nigerian politician and businessman
- Bayo Onanuga (born 1957), Nigerian journalist
- Saidat Onanuga (born 1974), Nigerian track and field sprinter
- Yetunde Onanuga (born 1960), Nigerian politician
