= Olaolu Olabimtan =

Nigerian accountant and politician

Hon. Olaolu Akanbi Olabimtan

Commissioner for Budget and Economic Planning of Ogun State
- Incumbent
- Assumed office October 2023
- Governor: Dapo Abiodun

Personal details
- Born: Ogun State, Nigeria
- Education: University of Lagos
- Occupation: Accountant, politician

Olaolu Akanbi Olabimtan is a Nigerian accountant and politician. He has worked in both private practice and public service, and currently serves as Commissioner for Budget and Economic Planning in Ogun State.

== Education ==
Olabimtan studied Accounting at the University of Lagos, where he earned a Bachelor of Science degree. He later completed a Master of Business Administration (MBA) in Finance at the same institution.

== Career ==
Olabimtan began his professional career as a trainee at KPMG. He later worked with AWD before joining PricewaterhouseCoopers, where he advanced to senior positions.

In 2009, he established his own firm, Olaolu Olabimtan & Co, a financial and business advisory practice, where he serves as Managing Partner and Chief Executive Officer.

He also holds a non‑executive directorship at Gateway Mortgage Bank Limited and is a member of the Institute of Directors.

Since October 2023, Olabimtan has served as Commissioner for Budget and Economic Planning in Ogun State.
