= Sabo Sagamu Market =

Historic market trading hub, survives a fire

Sabo market is a popular five days market in the heart of Sagamu, Ogun State, Nigeria. The market is very popular among the people of Ogun State.

== History ==
Sabo market was established in the 1800s and serves as one of the best local market in ogun state. The market was popular for selling raw farm produce to the people as both sellers and buyers came from every angle in Remo.

== Fire outbreak ==
After an explosion in a Benin market, Sabo Marke exploded at around 2 a.m. on 25 January 2020.

Shops and stalls were burnt, with goods worth millions of naira destroyed.

However, after the incident the governor of the state Dapo Abiodun paid a visit to the scene and promise to build a new modern market for the people of Sabo Community in Sagamu. The government later fulfilled its promise by distrusting palliative to the affected traders in September.
