= Abeokuta flyover =

Flyover in the city of Abeokuta, the capital of Ogun State, southwestern Nigeria

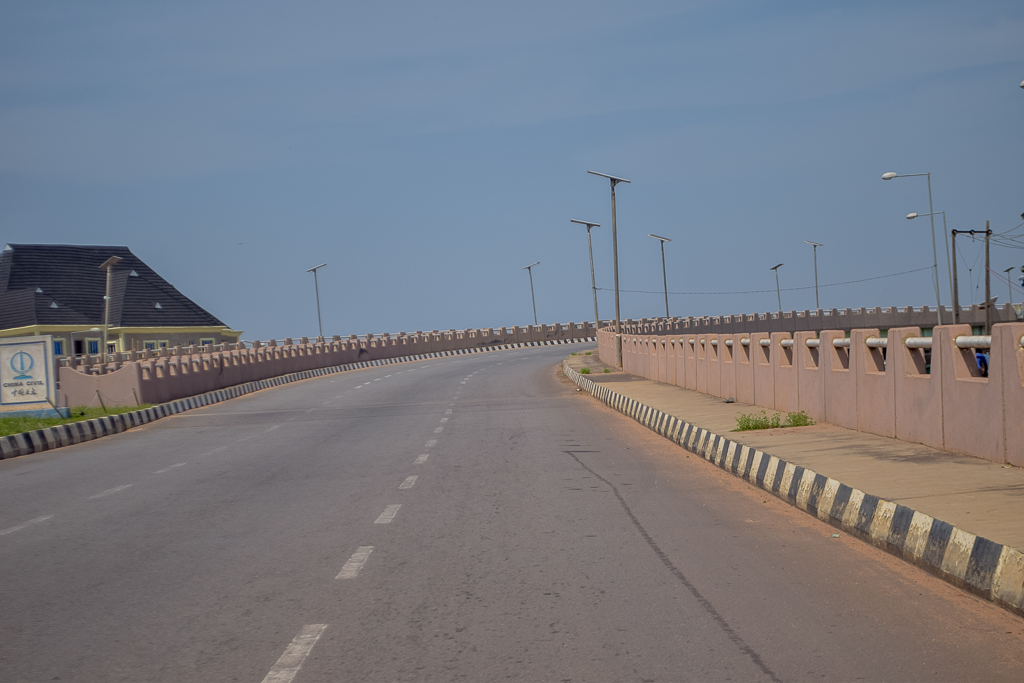

Location
- Abeokuta, Ogun, Nigeria

Construction
- Type: Flyover
- Constructed: 2013 by China Civil Engineering Construction Corporation
- Opened: 2013

The Abeokuta flyover is a flyover in the city of Abeokuta, the capital of Ogun State, southwestern Nigeria. The flyover was constructed at Ibara roundabout, Abeokuta by the Ogun State Government led by Senator Ibikunle Amosun. It is the first flyover constructed in the state. It was commissioned on Thursday January 24, 2013. The investment worth of the flyover is tagged at N1.5bn.

== Photo Gallery of Abeokuta flyover ==
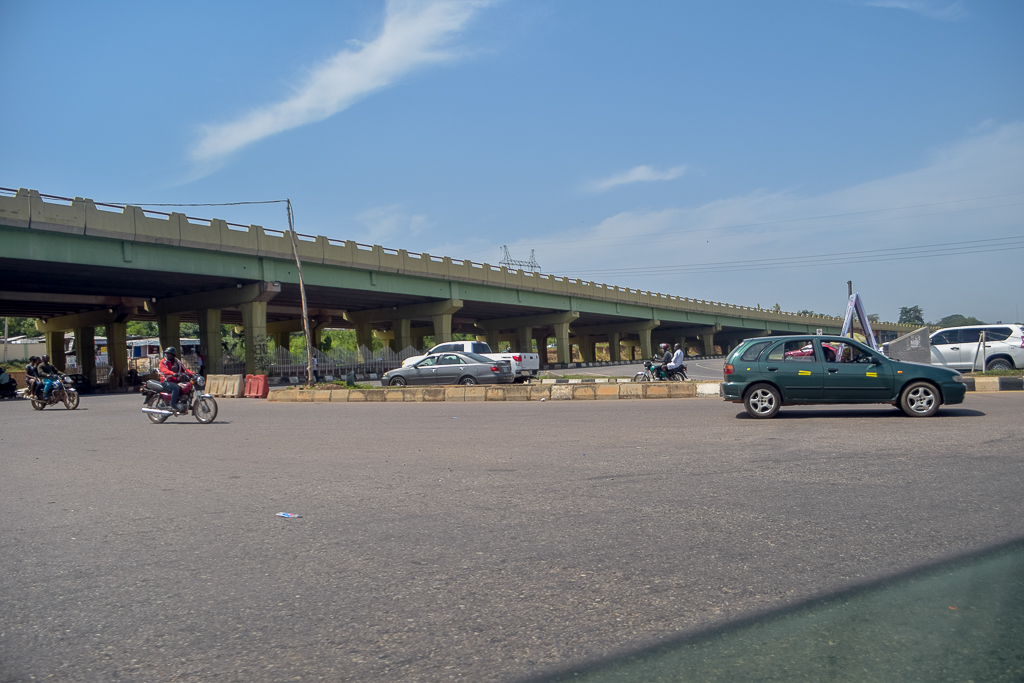

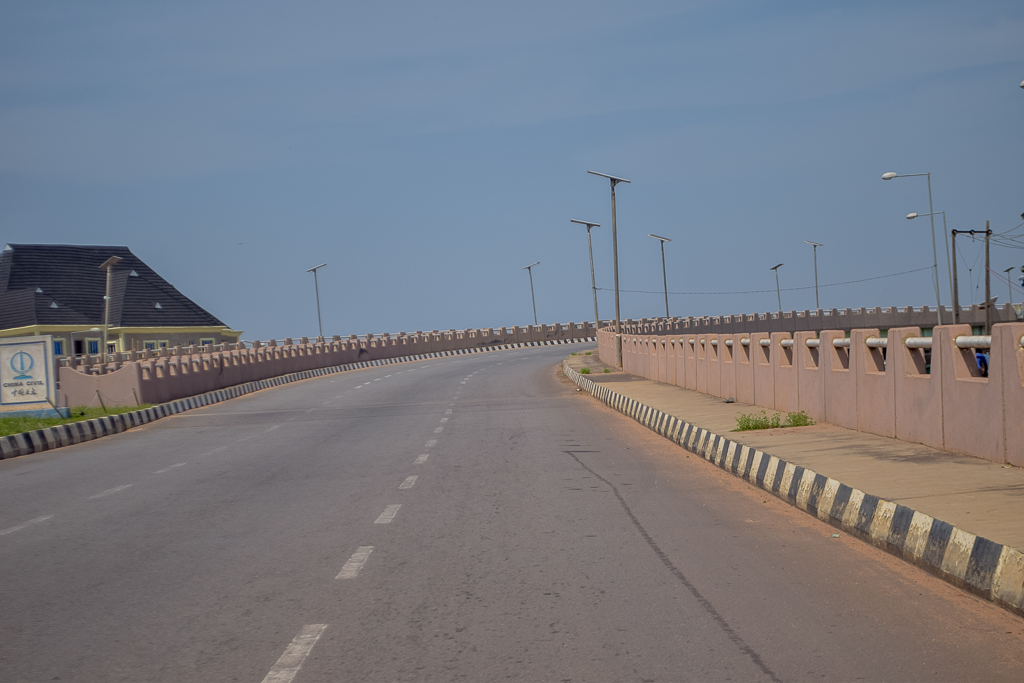

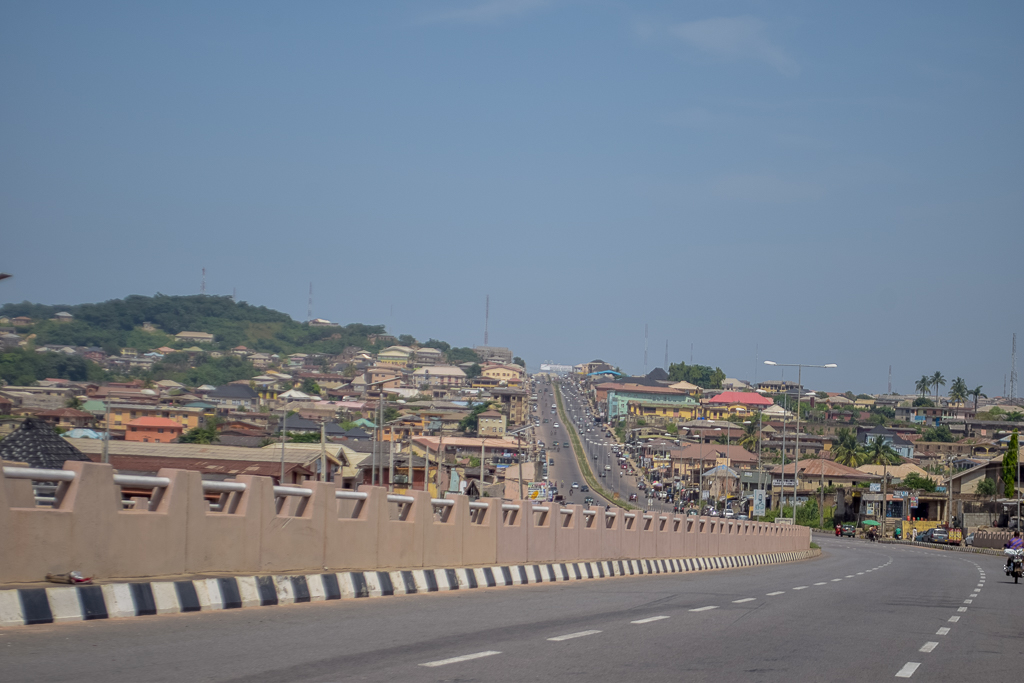

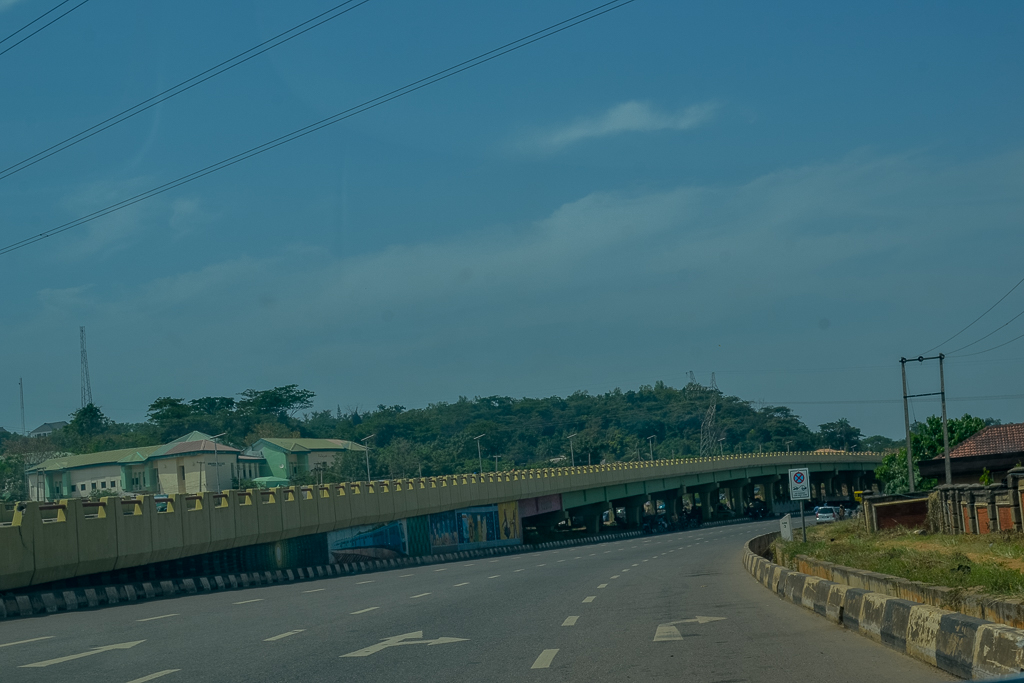

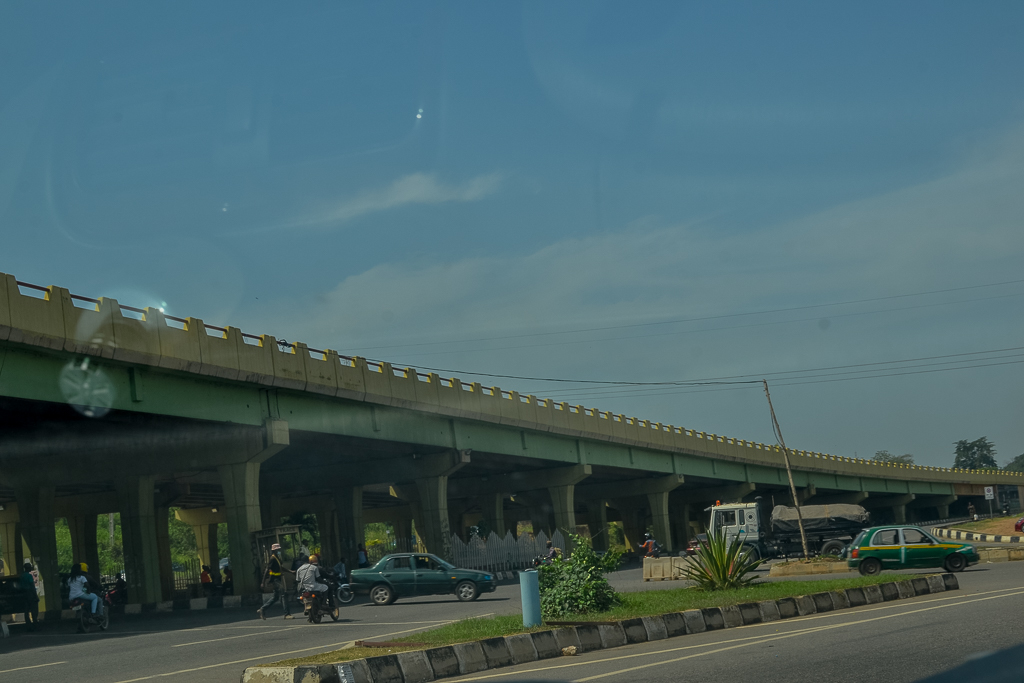

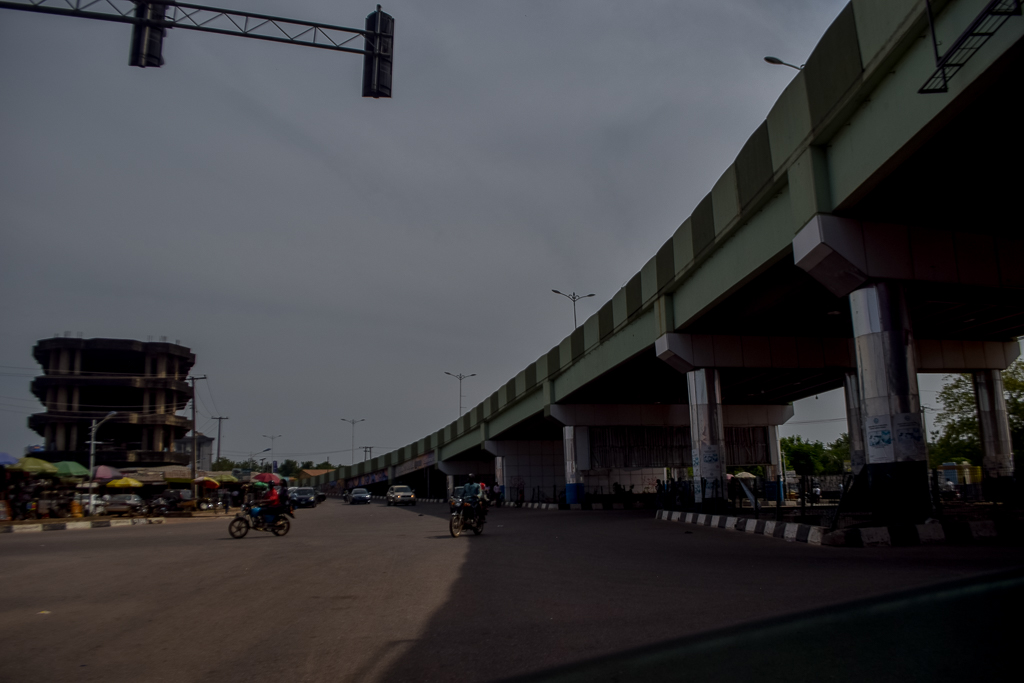

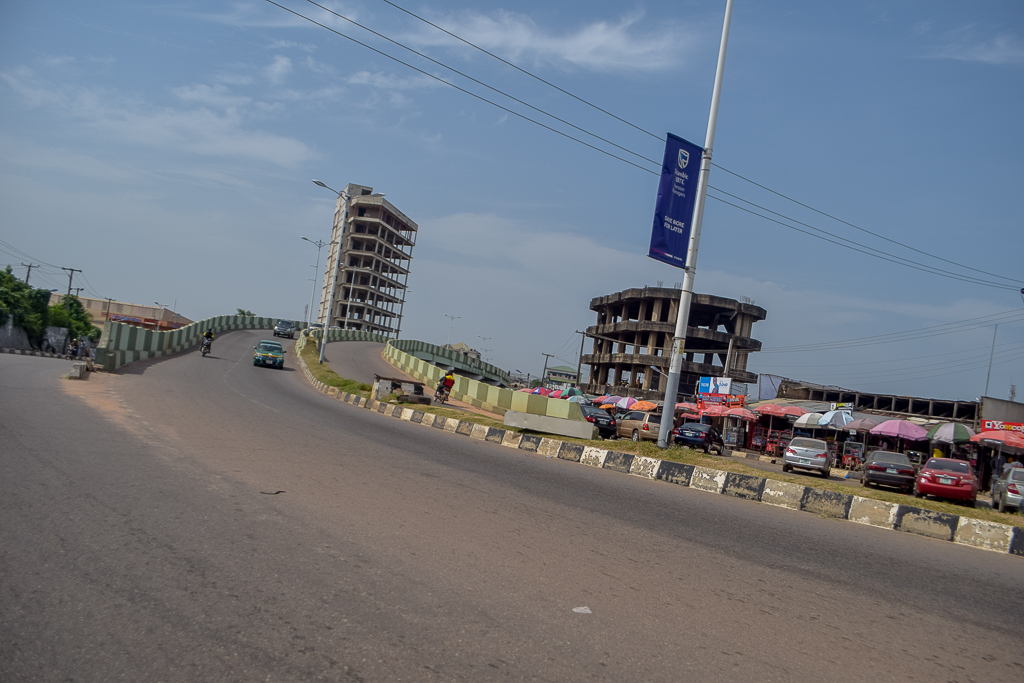

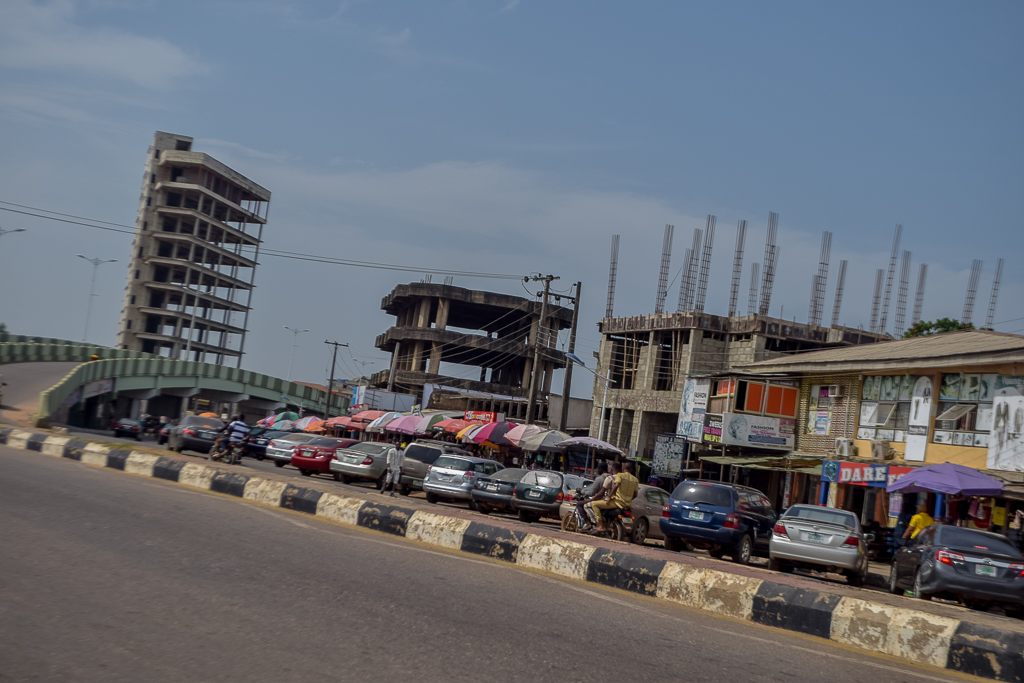

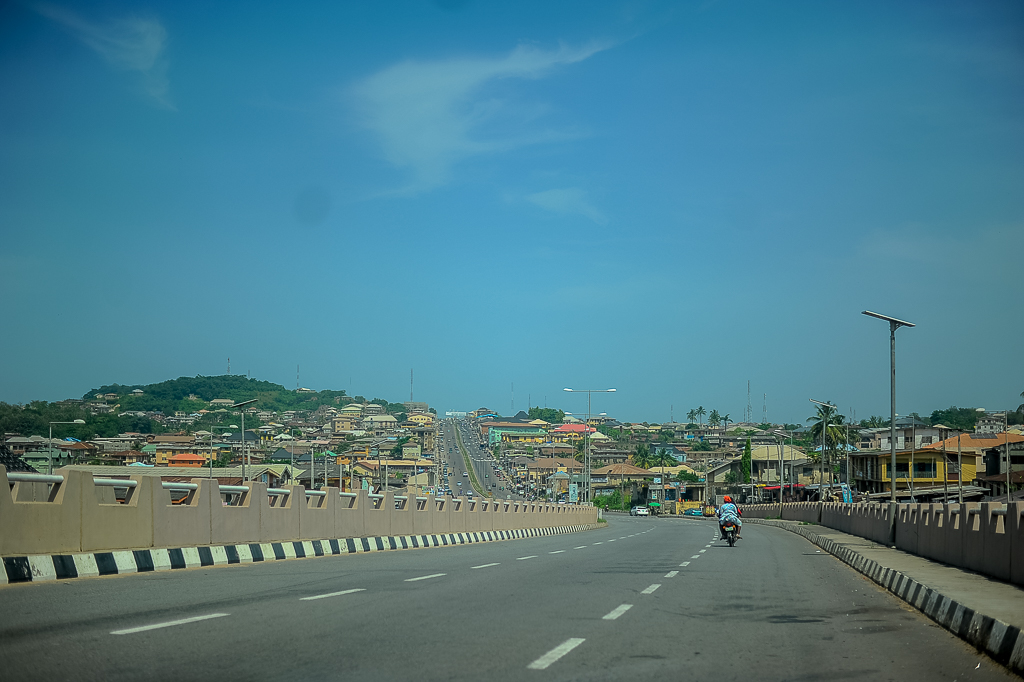
