= Buruji Kashamu =

Nigerian politician (1958–2020)

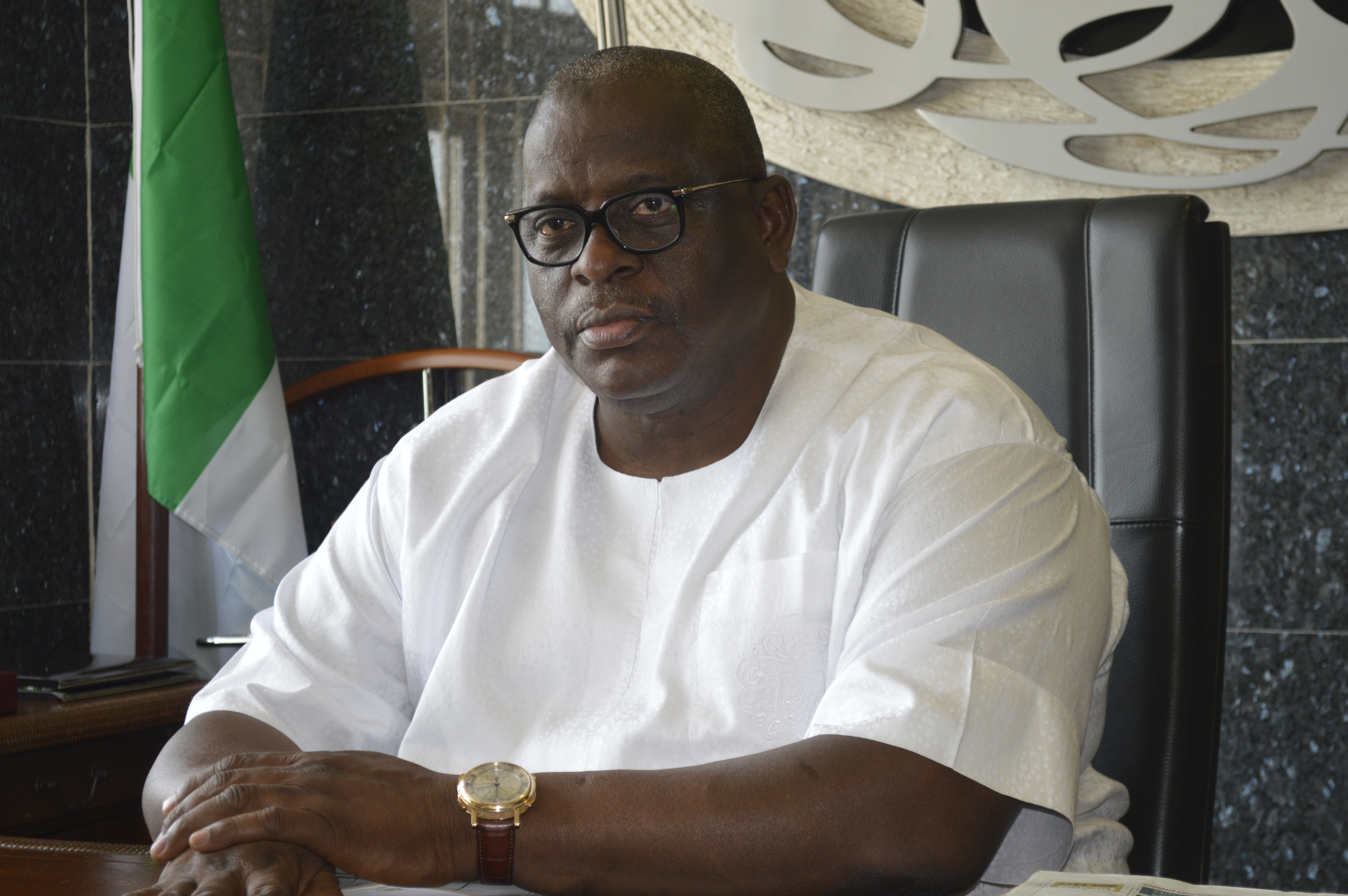
- Senator Kashamu

Senator for Ogun East
- In office 9 June 2015 – April 2019 Serving with Lanre Tejuosho; Joseph Dada
- Preceded by: Sefiu Adegbenga Kaka
- Succeeded by: Ramoni Olalekan Mustapha

Vice-Chairman of the Senate Committee on State and local Governments
- In office 9 June 2015 – April 2019
- Succeeded by: Ezenwa Francis Onyewuchi

Personal details
- Born: Buruji Kashamu; 19 May 1958 Ijebu-Igbo, Western Region, British Nigeria
- Died: 8 August 2020 (aged 62) Lagos, Nigeria
- Party: People's Democratic Party
- Education: Igbobi College; University of Lagos; Pitman College
- Profession: Businessman; politician
- Awards: NANS Golden Man of the Year 2015; Cambridge University (Honorary PhD. Philosophy)

Buruji Kashamu (19 May 1958 – 8 August 2020) was a Nigerian politician who served as a Senator representing Ogun East in the 8th National Assembly. Ogun East covers nine local government areas: Ijebu North East, Ijebu North, Ijebu-Ode, Ijebu East, Ikenne, Odogbolu, Remo North, Sagamu, and Ogun Waterside. Senator Kashamu was the vice-chairman of the Senate Committee on States and Local Government.

He was a chieftain of the People's Democratic Party, PDP in Ogun State. He was appointed as the chairman, Organization and Mobilization Committee of the PDP in the South West zone of Nigeria. In 2018, he was expelled from the People's Democratic Party, a decision later voided by an Abuja High Court in October 2018. He was the 2019 Ogun State gubernatorial election candidate of the Peoples Democratic Party. He died from COVID-19 during the COVID-19 pandemic in Nigeria on 8 August 2020.

== Early life and education ==
Kashamu was born in Ijebu-Igbo Ogun State, Nigeria on 19 May 1958. Kashamu started his education at Ansarudeen Primary School, Ijebu Igbo and left in 1972 to complete his primary school education at St. John Modern School, Lagos. He then attended evening classes at Igbobi College while working as a licensing agent. He later went to London where he took courses in Business Management at Pitman College, London. He was awarded an honorary PhD by the unaccredited, diploma-mill Cambridge Graduate University, located in Massachusetts, at a privately organised ceremony in Lagos, Nigeria.

Cambridge Graduate University claims to be accredited by the International Accreditation Organization (IAO). The IAO itself is listed as part of unrecognized higher education accreditation organizations. Cambridge Graduate University is not a recognised university in the United States due to this lack of accreditation.

== Politics ==
He contested the Ogun east senatorial seat and beat his closest rival with a poll of 99,540 votes against Prince Dapo Abiodun of the All Progressive Congress (APC) who polled 84,001 votes to clinch the senatorial seat. He was the flag bearer of the Peoples Democratic Party in the 2019 Ogun State gubernatorial election and lost against Dapo Abiodun of the All Progressives Congress coming in a distant 4th.

== Controversy ==
In 1998, Kashamu was arrested in the United Kingdom on drugs-related charges after trying to enter the country with $230,000 in cash. He was acquitted and released in 2003. British authorities refused a US extradition request on drugs charges, citing concerns about his identity after co-conspirator Nicholas Fillmore failed to identify Kashamu in a photo lineup; however Nigerian authorities announced their intention to deport him to the US on multiple occasions. Olusegun Obasanjo, a former president, warned that his ongoing freedom illustrated that "drug barons ... will buy candidates, parties and eventually buy power or be in power themselves".

It is claimed that Kashamu is the real identity of "Alhaji", the drug kingpin in Piper Kerman's book, Orange Is the New Black: My Year in a Women's Prison. and Cleary Wolters's book Out of Orange. Kashamu appears in vivid detail in Nicholas Fillmore's memoir, Smuggler.

== Death ==
Kashamu died from complications of COVID-19 in Lagos on 8 August 2020, during the COVID-19 pandemic in Nigeria. He was 62 years old.
