= Adebowale Akinsanya =

Nigerian engineer and politician

Engr. Adebowale Olayinka Akinsanya

Commissioner for Works and Infrastructure of Ogun State
- Incumbent
- Assumed office 2019
- Governor: Dapo Abiodun

Personal details
- Born: 21 February 1953 (age 73) Ogun State, Nigeria
- Education: University of Missouri–Rolla
- Occupation: Engineer, politician

Adebowale Olayinka Akinsanya (born 21 February 1953) is a Nigerian engineer and politician. He has worked in both public and private sectors, including service in Lagos State, and since 2019 has been the Commissioner for Works and Infrastructure in Ogun State.

== Early life and education ==
Akinsanya was born on 21 February 1953. He attended Tinubu Methodist Elementary School for his primary education and later studied at Mayflower School, Ikenne, where he completed his secondary education in 1970. In 1972, he enrolled at Christ's School, Ado‑Ekiti, where he finished his advanced level studies. He earned a Bachelor of Science degree in Mining Engineering in 1977 from the University of Missouri–Rolla in the United States, and completed a Master's degree in Structural Civil Engineering at the same institution in 1979.

== Career ==
From 1979 to 1986, he worked with the California Department of Transportation (Caltrans), beginning as an Assistant Bridge/Transportation Engineer and later promoted to Associate Bridge/Transportation Engineer. He is licensed as a civil engineer in California (License CE360414) and is registered with the Council for the Regulation of Engineering in Nigeria (COREN, R2197).

In October 2015, Akinsanya was appointed Commissioner for Waterfront Infrastructure Development in Lagos State by Governor Akinwunmi Ambode. In January 2018, he was reassigned to serve as Commissioner for Works and Infrastructure.

In 2019, he joined the Ogun State government as a Consultant to the Ministry of Works and Infrastructure under Governor Dapo Abiodun. He was later confirmed as Commissioner for Works and Infrastructure, a position he continues to hold.
