= 2011 Ogun State gubernatorial election =

State election in Nigeria

- 26 April 2011
| Nominee | Ibikunle Amosun | Tunji Olurin |
| Party | ACN | PDP |
| Popular vote | 514,962 | 377,487 |
Governor before election
Gbenga Daniel
PDP
Elected Governor
Ibikunle Amosun
ACN

The 2011 Ogun State gubernatorial election was the 7th gubernatorial election of Ogun State. Held on 26 April 2011, the Action Congress of Nigeria nominee Ibikunle Amosun won the election, defeating Tunji Olurin of the People's Democratic Party.

== Results ==
A total of 19 candidates contested in the election. Ibikunle Amosun from the Action Congress of Nigeria won the election, defeating Tunji Olurin from the People's Democratic Party. Valid votes was 729,671, votes cast was 764,384, 34,713 votes was cancelled.

2011 Ogun State gubernatorial election
| Party | Candidate | Votes | % | ±% |
|---|---|---|---|---|
| ACN | Ibikunle Amosun | 514,962 | 51.90 | |
| PDP | Tunji Olurin | 377,487 | 25.94 | |
| ACN hold | | | | |
