= Dapo Okubadejo =

Nigerian financial analyst and politician

Hon. Dapo Okubadejo

Commissioner for Finance of Ogun State
- Incumbent
- Assumed office July 2019
- Governor: Dapo Abiodun

Personal details
- Born: 1968 (age 57–58) Ogun State, Nigeria
- Education: Obafemi Awolowo University, University of Glasgow
- Occupation: Corporate Finance Specialist, Deal Adviser, Financial analyst, politician

Dapo Abdul‑Rahman Okubadejo (born 1968) is a Nigerian financial analyst and politician. Since 2019, he has served as Commissioner for Finance in Ogun State, and was also appointed Chief Economic Adviser to the state governor later that year.

== Early life and education ==
Okubadejo is from Ijebu Ode, Ogun State. He earned a bachelor's degree in agriculture (B.Agric) at Obafemi Awolowo University in 1990. He later obtained a master's degree in International Finance from the University of Glasgow, United Kingdom.

== Career ==
Okubadejo began his professional career at Arthur Andersen in 1992, working there until 2000 and rising to the position of Senior Manager. In 2006, he joined KPMG as an Equity Partner. By 2009, he was appointed Head of Deal Advisory and Private Equity for West Africa, and in 2012 his responsibilities expanded to cover Africa. In 2017, he became a member of the KPMG Nigeria Policy Board.

Since July 2019, he was appointed and has served as Commissioner for Finance in Ogun State. In December 2019, he was also named Chief Economic Adviser to the Governor of Ogun State.
