= Tomi Coker =

Nigeria politician

Marcellina Oluwatomi Coker (born 29 March 1967) is a Nigerian administrator, consultant obstetrician and gynaecologist, and politician. She has served as Commissioner for Health in Ogun State since January 2020, following her appointment by Governor Dapo Abiodun. She was reappointed to the same position in October 2023.

== Early life and education ==
Coker was born in Washington, D.C., United States, and is originally from Abeokuta, Ogun State. She attended Home Science Primary School in Ikoyi, Lagos State, and later Government College Ojo, Lagos. Between 1985 and 1991, she studied medicine at the University of Ibadan, earning the Bachelor of Medicine, Bachelor of Surgery (MBBS) degree. She completed her National Youth Service Corps (NYSC) programme at First Consultant Hospital, Obalende, Lagos.

Coker pursued further studies at the Harvard Business School between 2014 and 2015 and is also an alumna of the Harvard Kennedy School. She is a Fellow of the Royal College of Obstetricians and Gynaecologists.

== Professional career ==
In 2003, Coker became a consultant obstetrician and gynaecologist at West Hertfordshire Hospitals NHS Trust in the United Kingdom. She worked there for about sixteen years, eventually serving as Clinical Director. She has also held the position of vice-chair of the Royal College of Obstetricians and Gynaecologists (RCOG) Nigeria Liaison Group.
