= 2019 Nigerian National Assembly election in Ogun State =

An election for the National Assembly was held in Ogun State, Nigeria on Saturday, 22 February 2019.

== Results ==
The results of the elections were announced by Prof. Idowu Olayinka of University of Ibadan. Released on 24 February 2019, the All Progressives Congress emerged victorious over the Peoples Democratic Party, winning most seats.

=== Senate ===
==== Ogun East Senate district ====
Ogun East Senate district election, 2019
Party	Candidate	Votes	%	±%
APC	Lekan Mustapha	85,761	-	
People's Democratic Party	Ayoola Sosanwo	83,528	-	{{{change}}}
African Democratic Congress	Adedeji Ashiru	-	-	{{{change}}}
Allied Peoples Movement	Odusolu Oluwole	-	-	{{{change}}}
Total votes		-	100.00	
APC hold				

==== Ogun West Senate district ====
Ogun West Senate district election, 2019
Party	Candidate	Votes	%	
APC	Tolu Odebiyi	58,452		
Allied Peoples Movement	Gbeleyi Olusegun	48,611	-	{{{change}}}
People's Democratic Party	Odunleye Odunjo	43,454	-	{{{change}}}
African Democratic Congress	Ogunola Babatunde		-	{{{change}}}
Total votes		-	100.00	
APC hold				

==== Ogun Central Senate district ====
Ogun Central Senate district election, 2019
Party	Candidate	Votes	%	
APC	Ibikunle Amosun	88,110	-	
African Democratic Congress	Titilayo Gomez	37,101	-	{{{change}}}
People's Democratic Party	Abayomi Sanyaolu	33,276	-	{{{change}}}
Allied Peoples Movement	Francis Adenmosun	10,039	-	{{{change}}}
Total votes		-	100.00	
APC hold				

=== House of Representatives ===
As of 15 March 2019, elected members were:

No.	Constituency	Elected M.H.R	Party	Runner-up	Party	2nd Runner-up	Party	3rd Runner-up	Party	Notes
1	Abeokuta North/ Obafemi- Owode/Odeda	Olumide Osoba	All Progressives Congress	Abimbola Lanre-Balogun	People's Democratic Party	Kazzim Olayiwola	Allied Peoples Movement	Olabode Omoleye	African Democratic Congress	
2	Abeokuta South	Olanrewaju Edun	All Progressives Congress	Segun Showunmi	People's Democratic Party	Simisola Onaji	Allied Peoples Movement	Olusina Ogundimu	African Democratic Congress	
3	Ado-Odo/Ota	Jimoh Ojugbele	All Progressives Congress	Sunmonu Monsuru	People's Democratic Party	Rotimi Rahman	Allied Peoples Movement	Akande Abiodun	African Democratic Congress	
4	Egbado North/Imeko-Afon	Jimoh Olaifa	African Democratic Congress	Oladele Kayode	All Progressives Congress	Abiodun Adeyemi	Allied Peoples Movement	David Kojeku	People's Democratic Party	
5	Egbado South/Ipokia	Wasiu Lawal	Allied Peoples Movement	Otegbeye Olubiyi	All Progressives Congress	Ajose Paul	People's Democratic Party	Mukaila Adeyanju	African Democratic Congress	
6	Ifo/Ewekoro	Ayokunle Isiaka	All Progressives Congress	Adesina Lateef	People's Democratic Party	Adewolu Adeleke	Allied Peoples Movement	Olu Johnson	African Democratic Congress	
7	Ijebu North/Ijebu East/Ogun Waterside	Adekoya Abdul-Majeed	People's Democratic Party	Sulaiman Olubiyi	All Progressives Congress	Ettu Olawale	Allied Peoples Movement	Olamide Osinowo	African Democratic Congress	
8	Ijebu Ode/Odogbolu/Ijebu North East	Osunsanya Kolapo	All Progressives Congress	Sulaiman Olubiyi	People's Democratic Party	Giwa Daramola	Allied Peoples Movement	Gabriel Babasola	African Democratic Congress	
9	Ikenne/Shagamu/Remo North	Otunba Adewunmi	All Progressives Congress	Shote Taiwo	People's Democratic Party	Mafe Adeyinka	Allied Peoples Movement	Olanrewaju Fasasi	African Democratic Congress	

Keys: PDP APC APM ADC

== See also ==
- 2019 Nigerian general election
