= 2007 Ogun State gubernatorial election =

State election in Nigeria

- 14 April 2007
Nominee	Gbenga Daniel	Ibikunle Amosun
Party	PDP	ANPP
Popular vote	426,132	135,149
Governor before election
Gbenga Daniel
PDP
Elected Governor
Gbenga Daniel
PDP

The 2007 Ogun State gubernatorial election was the 6th gubernatorial election of Ogun State. Held on 14 April 2007, the People's Democratic Party nominee Gbenga Daniel won the election, defeating Ibikunle Amosun of the All Nigeria Peoples Party.

== Results ==
A total of 18 candidates contested in the election. Gbenga Daniel from the People's Democratic Party won the election, defeating Ibikunle Amosun from the All Nigeria Peoples Party. Registered voters was 1,466,308.

2007 Ogun State gubernatorial election
Party	Candidate	Votes	%	±%
PDP	Gbenga Daniel	426,132		
ANPP	Ibikunle Amosun	135,149		
PDP hold				
