= Adebola Emmanuel Sofela =

Nigerian banker and politician

Hon. Adebola Emmanuel Sofela

Commissioner for Commerce and Industry of Ogun State
- Incumbent
- Assumed office 2023
- Governor: Dapo Abiodun

Personal details
- Born: Ogun State, Nigeria
- Education: University of Ilorin, University of Lagos
- Occupation: Banker, accountant, politician

Adebola Emmanuel Sofela is a Nigerian banker, accountant, and politician. Since 2023, he has served as Commissioner for Commerce and Industry in Ogun State.

== Education ==
Sofela attended the International School, University of Ibadan, completing his secondary education in 1980. He studied at Ogun State Polytechnic, where he earned an Ordinary National Diploma (OND) in Business Administration in 1982. He obtained a Bachelor of Science degree in Accounting from the University of Ilorin in 1986/87, followed by a Master’s degree in Business Administration from the University of Lagos in 1996.

== Career ==
Sofela worked in the banking industry until August 2011, serving as Divisional Director and General Manager at Equatorial Trust Bank Limited (now Sterling Bank PLC). He later joined Globacom Limited, where he was Group Treasurer and Director of the Executive Office until February 2018.

In 2023, Governor Dapo Abiodun nominated him for a commissioner role, and he was subsequently confirmed and appointed Commissioner for Commerce and Industry in Ogun State.

== Membership ==
Sofela is a member of the Institute of Chartered Accountants of Nigeria, having joined in 1989. He is also an Associate of the Chartered Institute of Bankers of London, a qualification he obtained in 1988.
