= 1979 Ogun State gubernatorial election =

1979 gubernatorial election in Ogun State, Nigeria

- July 28, 1979
Nominee	Olabisi Onabanjo
Party	UPN
Elected Governor
Olabisi Onabanjo
UPN

The 1979 Ogun State gubernatorial election occurred on July 28, 1979. UPN candidate Olabisi Onabanjo won the election.

== Results ==
Olabisi Onabanjo representing UPN won the election. The election held on July 28, 1979.
