= 1983 Ogun State gubernatorial election =

1983 gubernatorial election in Ogun State, Nigeria

- August 13, 1983
Nominee	Olabisi Onabanjo
Party	UPN
Elected Governor
Olabisi Onabanjo
UPN

The 1983 Ogun State gubernatorial election occurred on August 13, 1983. UPN candidate Olabisi Onabanjo won the election.

== Results ==
Olabisi Onabanjo representing UPN won the election. The election held on August 13, 1983.
