= Yetunde Onanuga =

Nigerian politician (born 1960)

Deputy Governor of Ogun State
- In office 29 May 2015 – 29 May 2019
- Governor: Ibikunle Amosun
- Preceded by: Segun Adesegun
- Succeeded by: Noimot Salako-Oyedele

Personal details
- Born: 11 September 1960 (age 65) Ibadan, Western Region, British Nigeria (now in Oyo State, Nigeria)
- Party: All Progressives Congress
- Occupation: Politician

Yetunde Onanuga (born 11 September 1960) is a Nigerian politician who served as deputy governor of Ogun state from 2015 to 2019.

== Life ==
Yetunde Onanuga was born at Adeoyo Hospital in Ibadan, the capital of Oyo State in Nigeria. Her father was F.T. Fabamwo.

She was educated in Ogun state and then in Lagos where she obtained her teachers certificate. She later completed an MBA at Ogun State University.

She was working in the Lagos State ministry of environment when she was chosen as the running mate of the state governor Ibikunle Amosun in 2015. Amosun was the sitting candidate but his previous deputy governor had defected to an opposition party. Amosun chose Onanuga out of three possible candidates.

Onanuga was elected deputy governor.

In 2022 she joined the All Progressives Congress party in support of the new Governor Dapo Abiodun.
