= 2019 Ogun State gubernatorial election =

- 9 March 2019
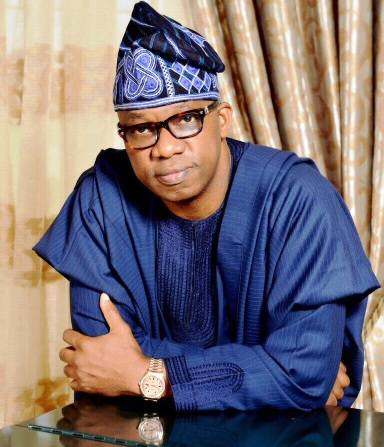

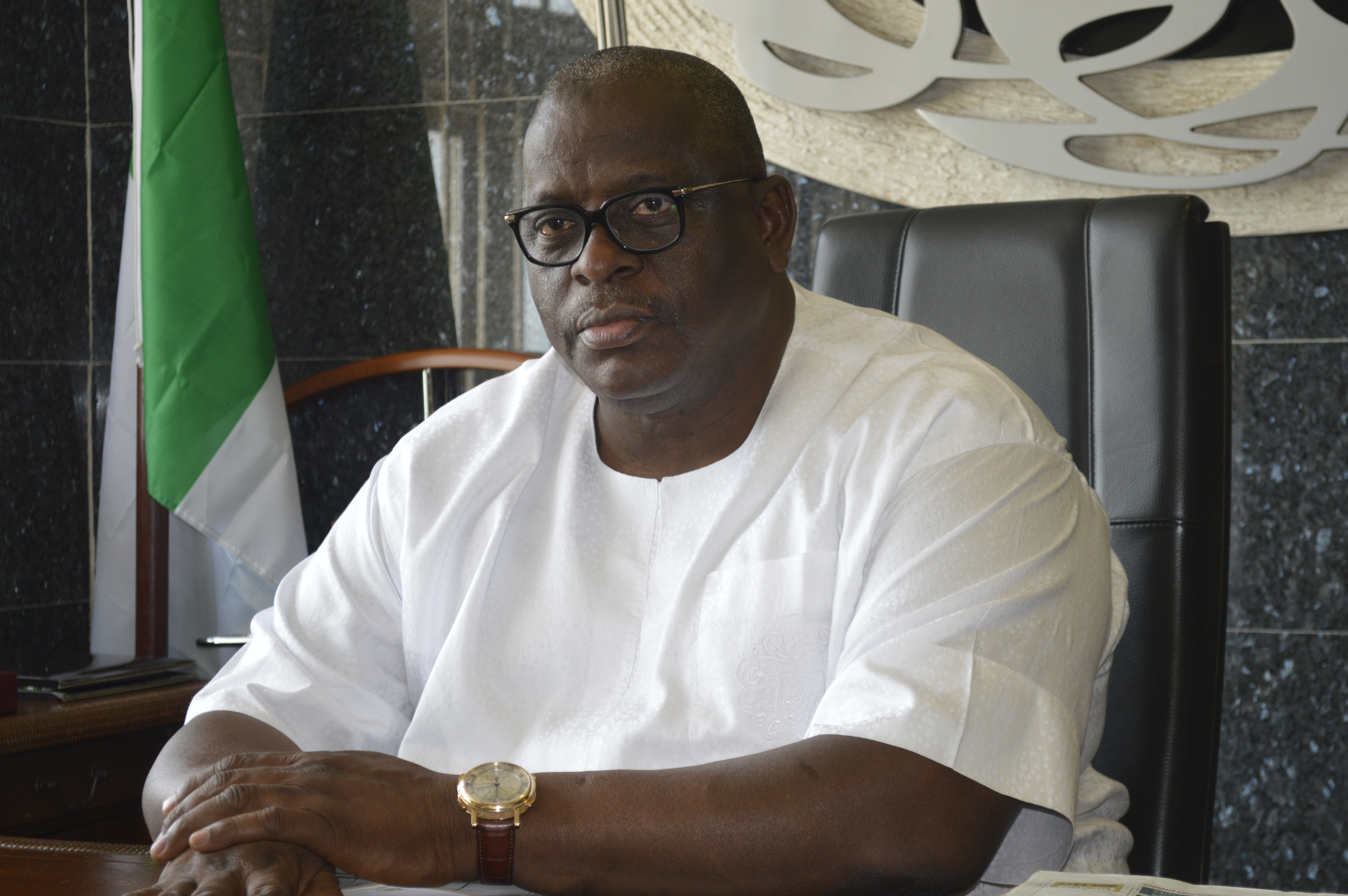

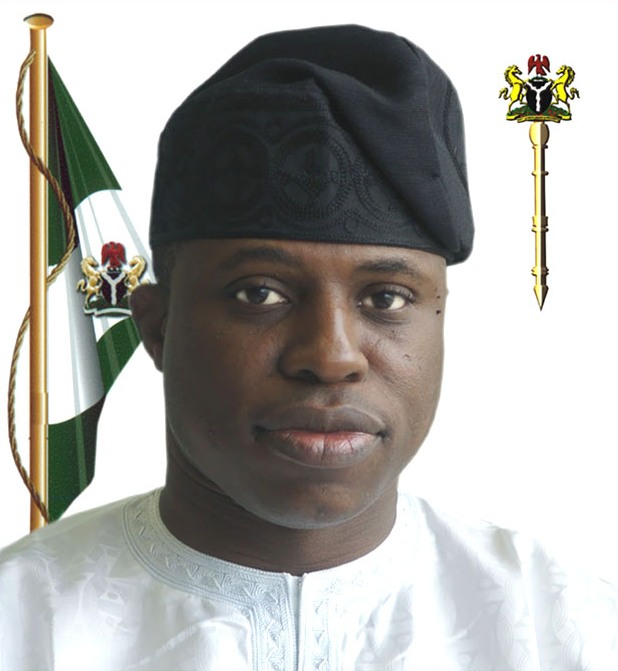
Nominee	Dapo Abiodun	Adekunle Akinlade	Gboyega Nasir Isiaka
Party	All Progressive Congress	Allied Peoples Movement	ADC
Running mate	Noimot Salako-Oyedele	Adepeju Adebajo	Olukemi Okeowo-Bolade
Popular vote	241,670	222,153	110,422
Percentage	35.49	32.62	16.22%
Nominee	Buruji Kashamu	Dimeji Bankole
Party	People's Democratic Party	Action Democratic Party
Running mate	Reuben Abati	Oluwafunmilayo Oduwole
Popular vote	70,290	9,666
Percentage	10.32	1.42
Governor before election
Ibikunle Amosun
All Progressives Congress
Elected Governor
Dapo Abiodun
All Progressive Congress

The election for Governor of Ogun State took place on 9 March (postponed from 2 March). The election was held concurrently with various state-level elections. All Progressive Congress candidate Dapo Abiodun, who is a former senatorial aspirant and chairman of CAC, defeated Allied Peoples Movement candidate Adekunle Akinlade, African Democratic Congress candidate Gboyega Nasir Isiaka, Peoples Democratic Party candidate Buruji Kashamu and Action Democratic Party candidate Dimeji Bankole.

The Governor and Deputy Governor of Ogun State are elected on the same ticket.

== APC primary ==
=== Candidates ===
- Dapo Abiodun, Chairman board of CAC
- Adekunle Akinlade, member of the House of Representatives
- George Olatunji
- Jimi Lawal

== PDP primary ==
=== Candidates ===
- Buruji Kashamu, Senator
- Ladi Adebutu, member of the House of Representatives
- Adeleke Shittu

== Other contestants ==
- Prince Gboyega Nosiru Isiaka (ADC).
- Adekunle Akinlade (Allied People's Movement).
- Dimeji Bankole (ADP).
- Olatunde Rotimi Paseda (SDP).
- Oluseyi Olufade (Alliance for Democracy).
- Adesina Kowonise (Yes Electorates
- Solidarity).
- Sir Tope Tokoya (Accord Party).
- Michael Adeeko (Unity Party of Nigeria).
- Olusegun Odegbami (Zenith Labour Party).
- Kunle Samson Elegbede (Democratic People’s Party).
- Nurudeen Oduwaiye (Mega Party of Nigeria).
- Adesegun Omowonula Taiwo (CAP).
- Lawal Abiola (People's Progressive Party).
- John Adegbola (Action Alliance).
- Olusegun Olufemi (Better Nigeria Progressives Party).
- Bello Akeem Alabi (Coalition for Change).
- Folakemi Eniola (African Action Congress).
- Ogunbiyi Bolanle (Progressives People’s Alliance).
- Olufemi Olomu (Alliance of Social Democratic).
- Oyefeso blessing (Justice Must Prevail Party).
- Adefioye Hamed (National Conscience Party).
- Adewale Omoniyi (Abundant Nigeria Renewal Party).
- Olufemi Onifade (FDP).
- Olayemi Olawale Olubunmi (All Grassroots Alliance).
- Sanyaolu Omolaja (Democratic Alternative).
- Engineer Abiodun Onabanjo (Rebuild).
- Reverend Emmanuel Okinoye (Freedom and Justice Party).
- Stephen Abiade (Advanced Congress of Democrats).
- Olufemi Falana (United People's Party).
- Akinboro Oluwole (People's Party of Nigeria).
- Adegbuyi Adebonojo (Young Progressives Party).
- Adetola Olusegun (People of Democratic Change).
- Mosuro Adebayo (Independent Democrats).
- Oduntan Adegbite (KOWA).
- Odejide Jimoh Adio (Democratic People’s Congress).
- Kassim Adunni (United Democratic Party).

== General election ==
=== Results ===
Ogun State gubernatorial election, 2019
Party	Candidate	Votes	%	±%
APC	Dapo Abiodun	241,670	35.49	
Allied Peoples Movement	Adekunle Akinlade	222,153	32.62	
African Democratic Congress	Gboyega Nasir Isiaka	110,422	16.22	
People's Democratic Party	Buruji Kashamu	70,290	10.32	
Action Democratic Party	Dimeji Bankole	9,666	1.42	
Majority		654,201	96.07	
Turnout		712,743		
APC hold		Swing		

== See also ==
- Nigerian National Assembly election, 2019 (Ogun State)
