= 2003 Ogun State gubernatorial election =

2003 gubernatorial election in Ogun State, Nigeria

- April 19, 2003
Nominee	Gbenga Daniel	Olusegun Osoba
Party	PDP	AD
Running mate	Salimot Badru	Sefiu Adegbenga Kaka
Popular vote	449,335	231,982
Governor before election
Gbenga Daniel
PDP
Elected Governor
Gbenga Daniel
PDP

The 2003 Ogun State gubernatorial election occurred in Nigeria on April 19, 2003. The PDP nominee Gbenga Daniel won the election, defeating Olusegun Osoba of the AD.

Gbenga Daniel emerged PDP candidate. He picked Salimot Badru as his running mate. Olusegun Osoba was the AD candidate with Sefiu Adegbenga Kaka as his running mate.

== Electoral system ==
The Governor of Ogun State is elected using the plurality voting system.

== Primary election ==
=== PDP primary ===
The PDP primary election was won by Gbenga Daniel. He picked Salimot Badru as his running mate.

=== AD primary ===
The AD primary election was won by Olusegun Osoba. He picked Sefiu Adegbenga Kaka as his running mate.

== Results ==
A total number of 11 candidates registered with the Independent National Electoral Commission to contest in the election.

The total number of registered voters in the state was 1,576,875. Total number of votes cast was 747,296, while number of valid votes was 701,375. Rejected votes were 45,921.

Candidate	Party	Votes	%
Gbenga Daniel	People's Democratic Party	449,335	65.95
Olusegun Osoba	Alliance for Democracy	231,982	34.05
Total		681,317	100.00
Valid votes		681,317	93.69
Invalid/blank votes		45,921	6.31
Total votes		727,238	100.00
Registered voters/turnout		1,576,875	46.12
Source: CCSU
