= 1991 Ogun State gubernatorial election =

1991 gubernatorial election in Ogun State, Nigeria

Ogun gubernatorial election
- December 14, 1991
| Nominee | Olusegun Osoba |
| Party | SDP |
Elected Governor
Olusegun Osoba
SDP

The 1991 Ogun State gubernatorial election occurred on December 14, 1991. SDP candidate Olusegun Osoba won the election.

== Conduct ==
The gubernatorial election was conducted using an open ballot system. Primaries for the two parties to select their flag bearers were conducted on October 19, 1991.

The election occurred on December 14, 1991. SDP candidate Olusegun Osoba won the election.
