= Gbenga Daniel =

Nigerian politician (born 1956)

Otunba Gbenga Daniel
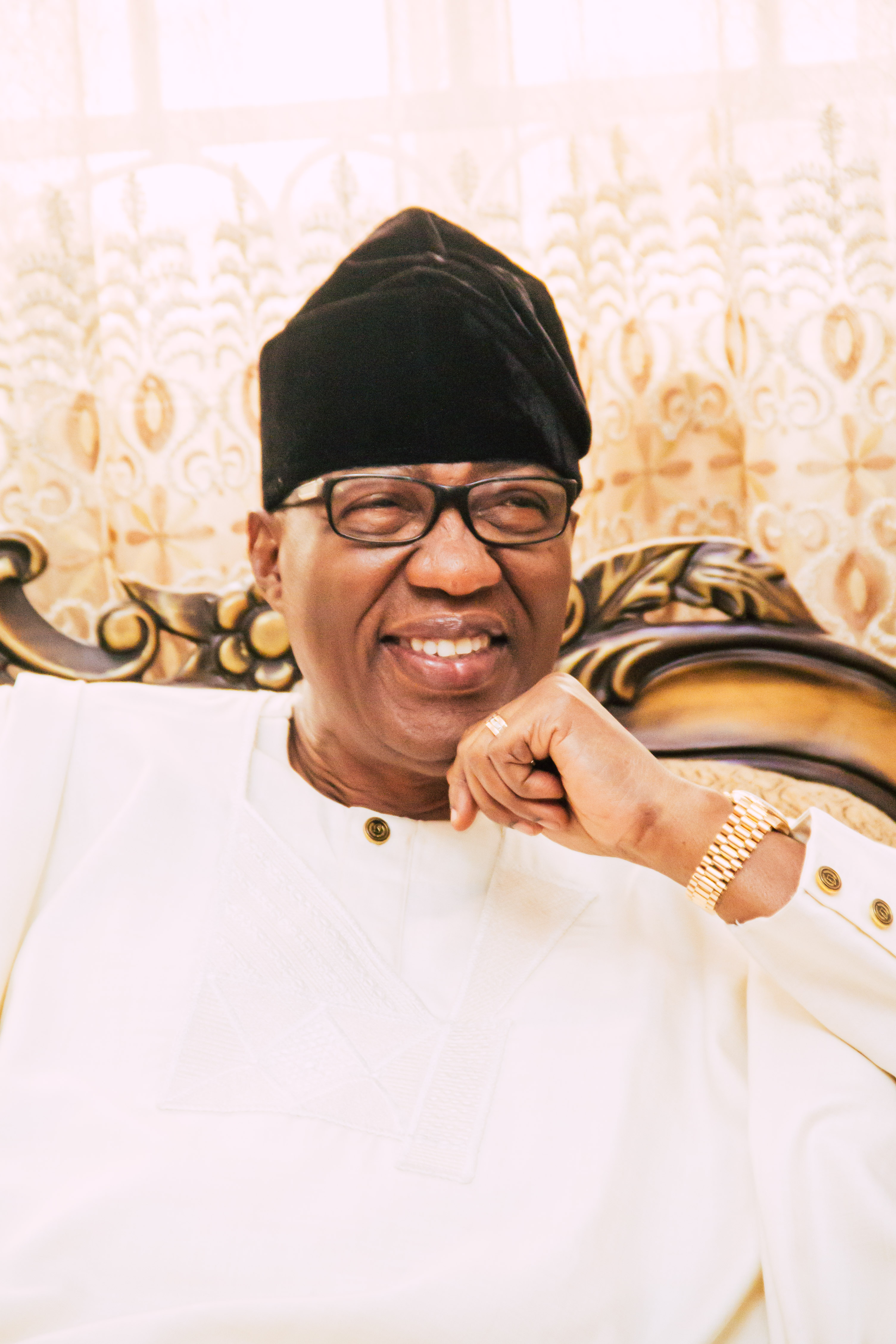

Senator for Ogun East
- Incumbent
- Assumed office 13 June 2023
- Preceded by: Ramoni Olalekan Mustapha

Governor of Ogun State
- In office 29 May 2003 – 29 May 2011
- Deputy: Salimot Badru
- Preceded by: Olusegun Osoba
- Succeeded by: Ibikunle Amosun

Personal details
- Born: 6 April 1956 (age 70) Ibadan, Western Region, British Nigeria (now in Oyo State, Nigeria)
- Party: All Progressives Congress (2021–present)
- Other political affiliations: Peoples Democratic Party (1998–2019)
- Spouse: Olufunke Daniel
- Children: 5
- Education: University of Lagos (BSC); Lagos Business School (MBA)
- Profession: Politician; businessman
- Website: www.otunbagbengadaniel.org

Gbenga Daniel (born 6 April 1956) is a Nigerian politician who has served as Senator for Ogun East since 2023. He previously served as governor of Ogun State from 2003 to 2011.

He is the owner of Kresta Laurel, an Electro-mechanical Engineering company, he started in 1990. He is also the Founder of Conference Hotels with branches in Ijebu-Ode, Sagamu, Abeokuta and Isheri part of Lagos.

As governor, his programs on Public Private Partnership attracted several businesses into the State during his tenure.

== Early life and education ==
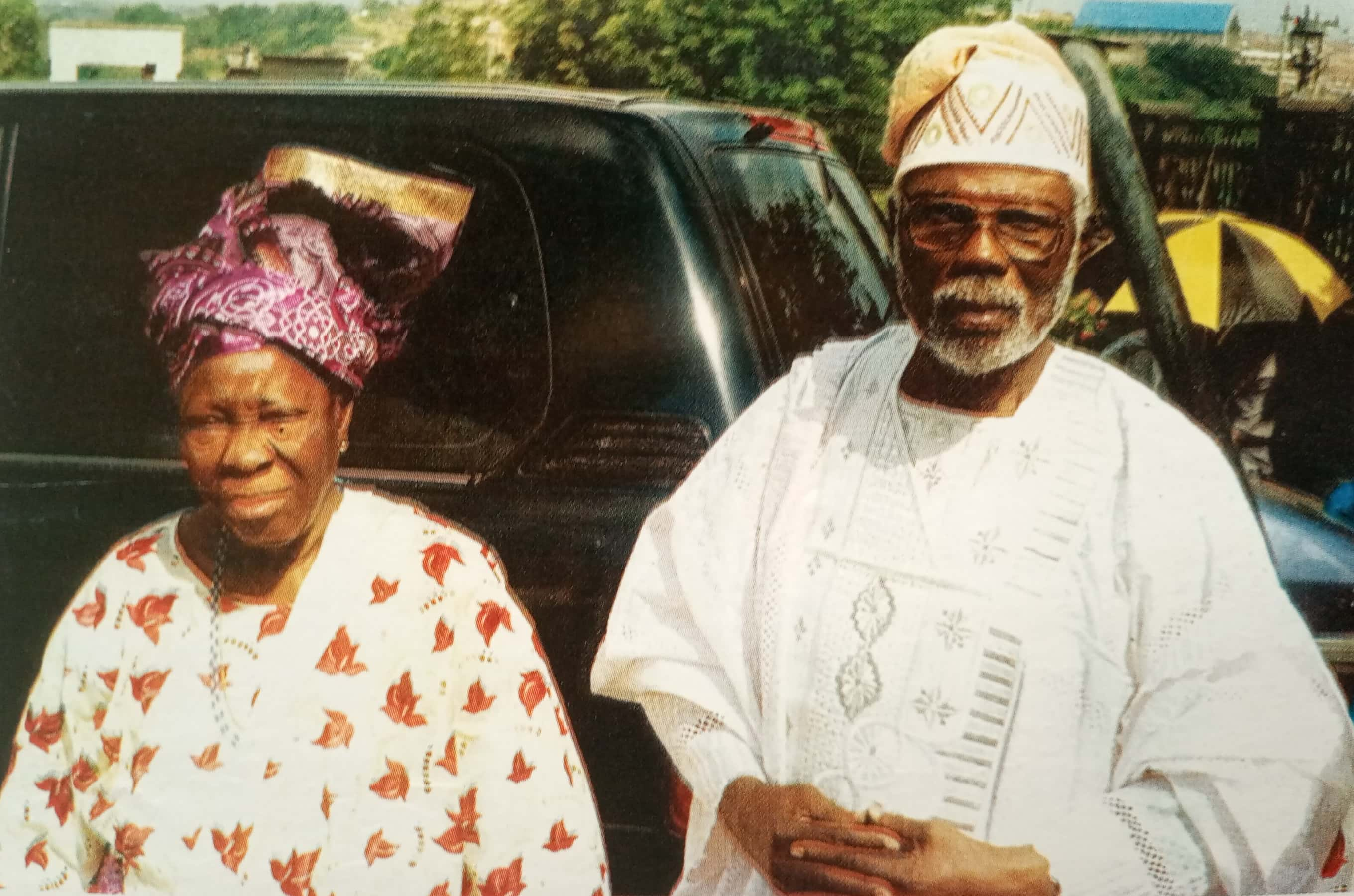
Most Rev. Adebola Daniel and Mrs Olaitan Daniel, parents of Otunba Gbenga Daniel

Gbenga Daniel was born on 6 April 1956 in Ibadan, Oyo State, to Christian parents, Most Rev. Adebola Daniel of Makun, Sagamu and Madam Olaitan Daniel of Omu-Ijebu. His father was a notable missionary of the Church of the Lord (Aladura) while his mother was a trader.

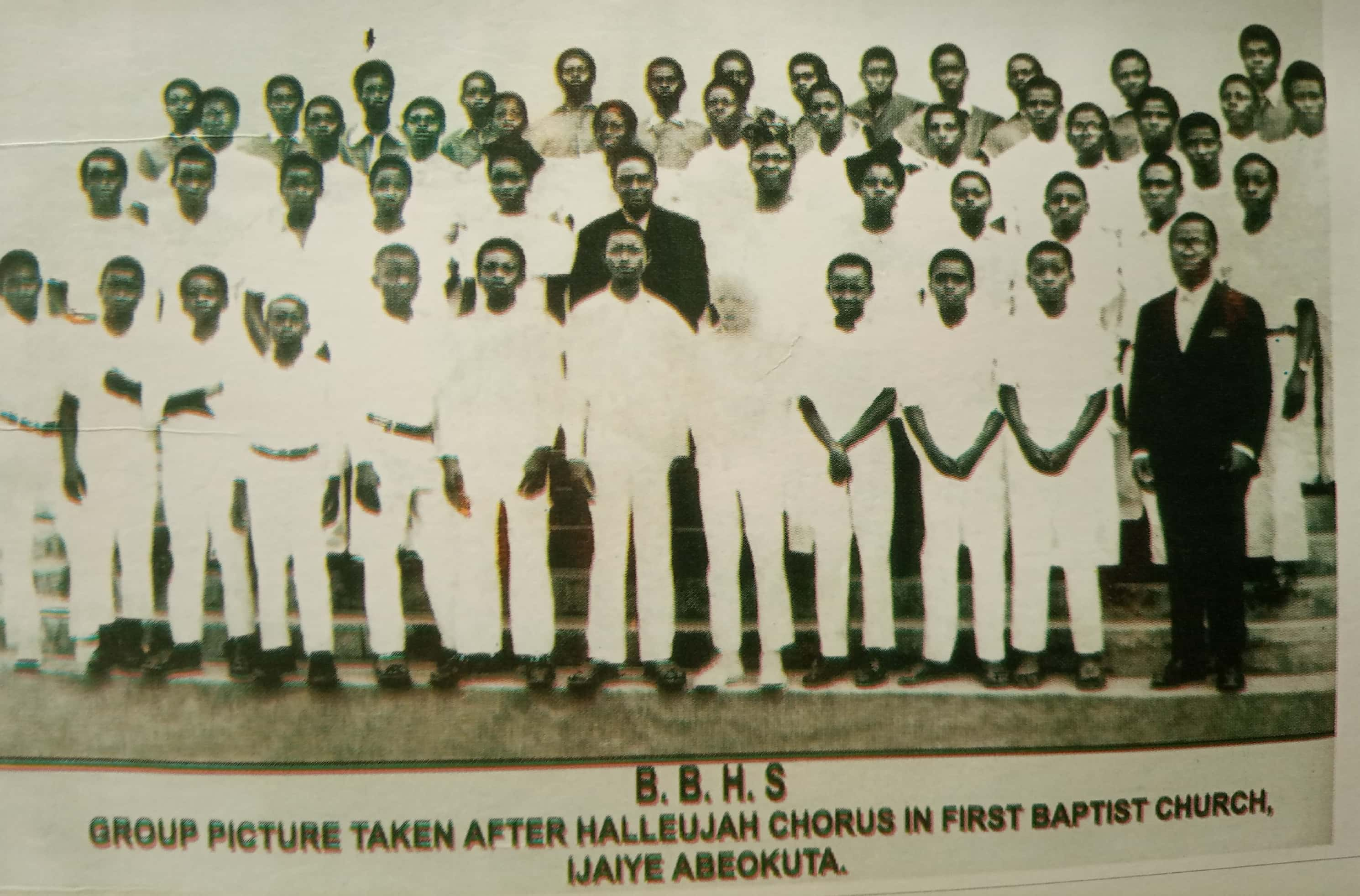
Group picture taken after hallelujah chorus in first Baptist Church, Ijaiye Abeokuta

Daniel attended the Baptist Boys' High School, Abeokuta from 1969 to 1973. While there, he represented the school in debates and quiz competitions – a factor that made him exceptionally popular among his contemporaries and stimulated his inclination towards intellectual pursuits. Having graduated from the Baptist Boys High School in flying colors, he proceeded first to the School of Basic Studies at The Polytechnic, Ibadan, in Oyo state

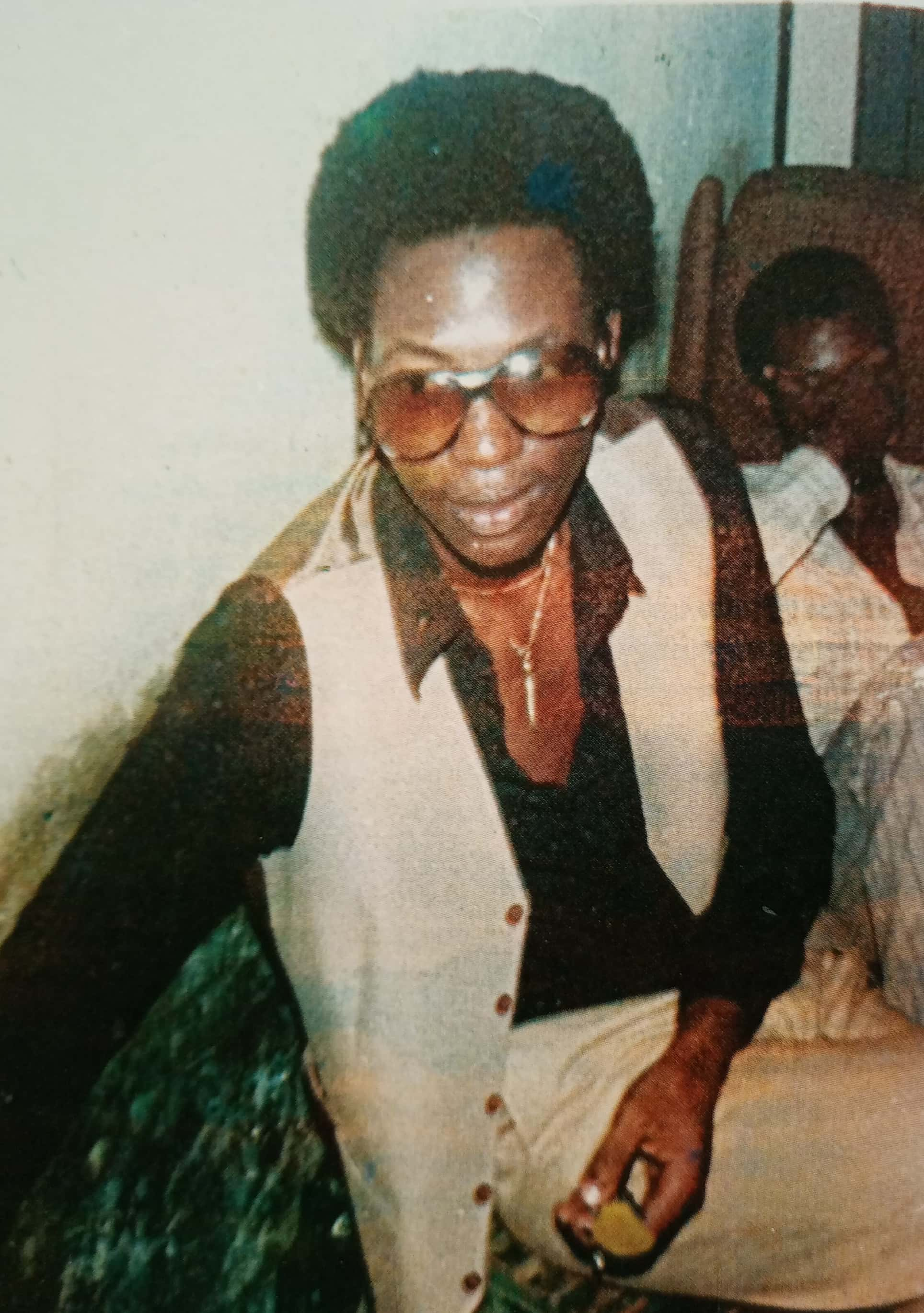
Gbenga Daniel at the Polytechnic Ibadan, 1974.

for his Advanced Level (A' Level) and thereafter moved to the School of Engineering of the University of Lagos. In his early years as an undergraduate, he won several scholarships and also became well acquainted with the renowned, Prof. Ayodele Awojobi as one of the best students of the late professor. It was whilst still an undergraduate, that he became indoctrinated into the select Committee of friends of the late Saga, Chief Obafemi Awolowo, indeed, as the youngest member of that select Committee that later metamorphosed into the Unity Party of Nigeria (UPN).

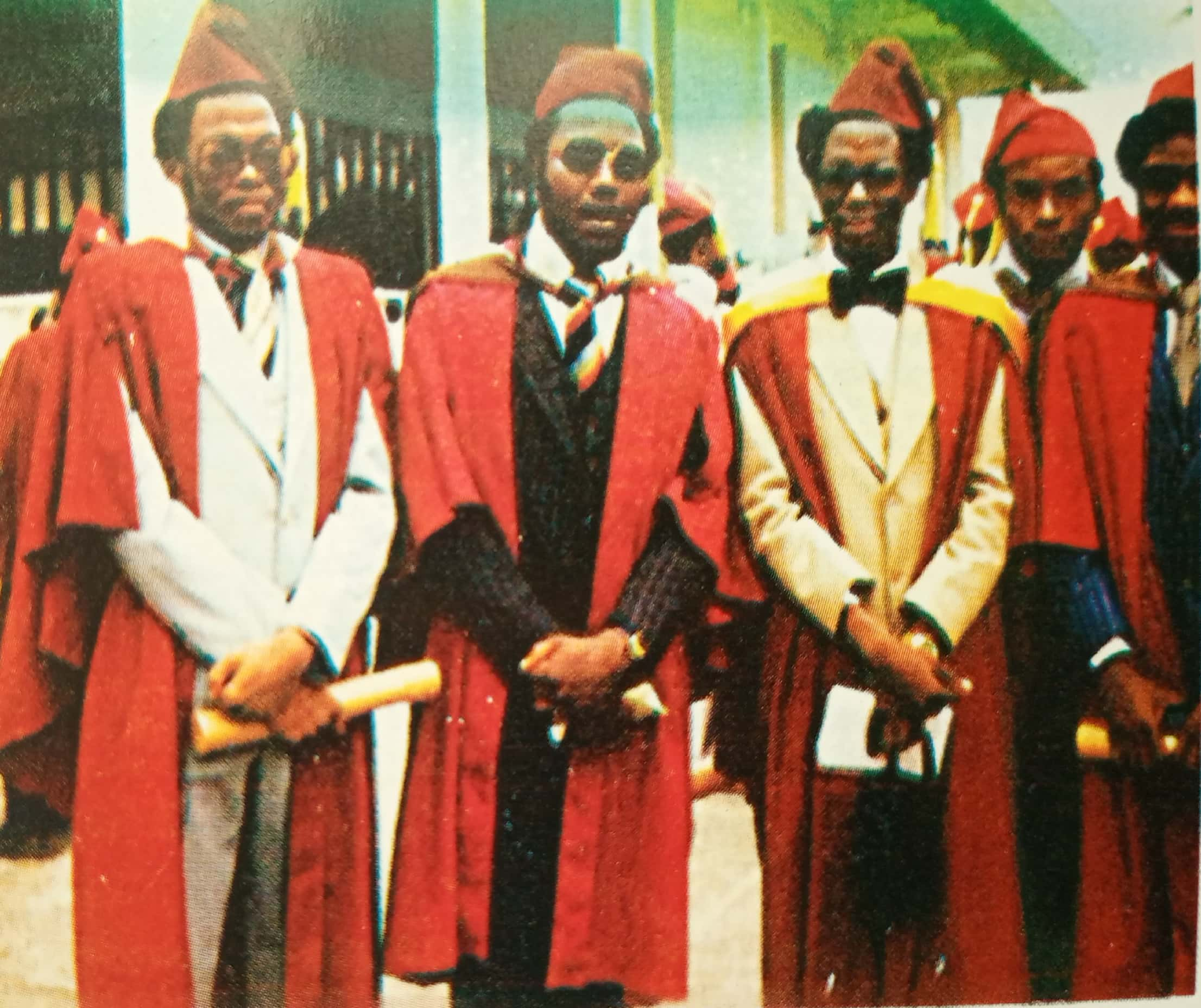
Gbenga Daniel with fellow graduands during the University of Lagos Convocation, 1979.

Daniel's decision to study engineering was influenced by the brilliant engineer and teacher Ayodele Awojobi. Daniel spent much time with Awojobi, and was a winner and champion several times over, on his television quiz show "Mastermind".

During his National Service year at the School of Engineering of the Lagos State Polytechnic, he supervised the construction of the Engineering complex and also conducted the semester examinations for the School of Engineering. The feat was described by an appreciative management as "quite remarkable in an environment where examination fraud is quite rampant".

He earned a Master's in business administration (MBA) from the University of Lagos and subsequently attended Lagos Business School for an executive programme in 1990.

== Professional and business career ==
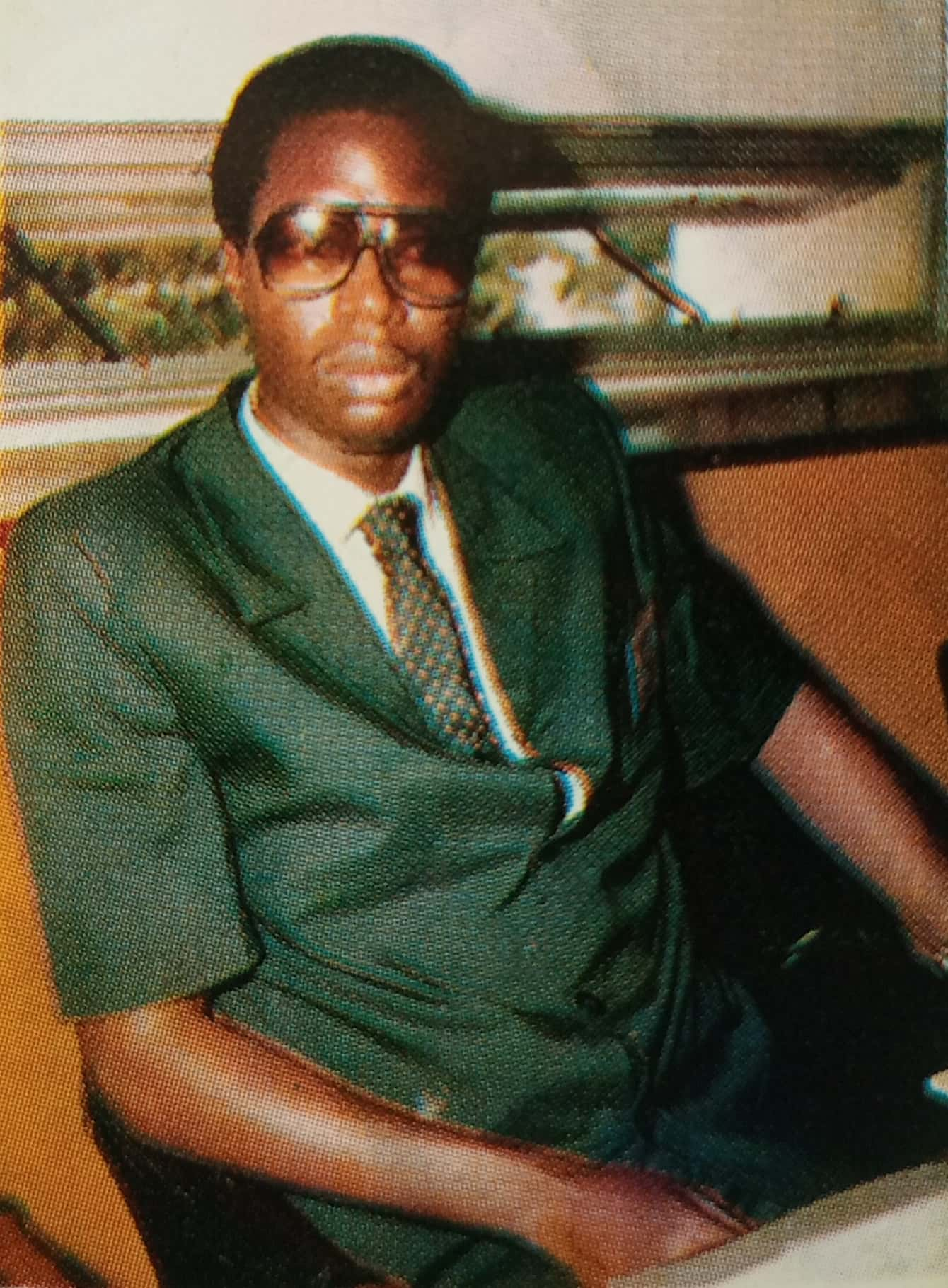
Gbenga Daniel as Sales Engineer with H.F Schroeder (W.A.) Limited, 1983.

Daniel began his professional career as a lecturer in the School of Engineering at the Lagos State Polytechnic during his National Youth Service year. He then proceeded to the Metal Construction (W/Africa) Limited which he left as the Assistant Commercial Manager. In 1983, he joined the then multinational company, H.F.SCHROEDER West Africa Limited, Lagos.He rose to the position of Deputy managing director at Schroeder, becoming the first African to hold such a position in the company's history. In 1990, he left Schroeder to start Kresta Laurel, an engineering firm specializing in elevators, overhead travelling cranes and hoists. In 2017, he started KLL Construction Limited, to present a new kind of Construction Company that will stand the test of time. He is also the chairman, Conference Hotels.

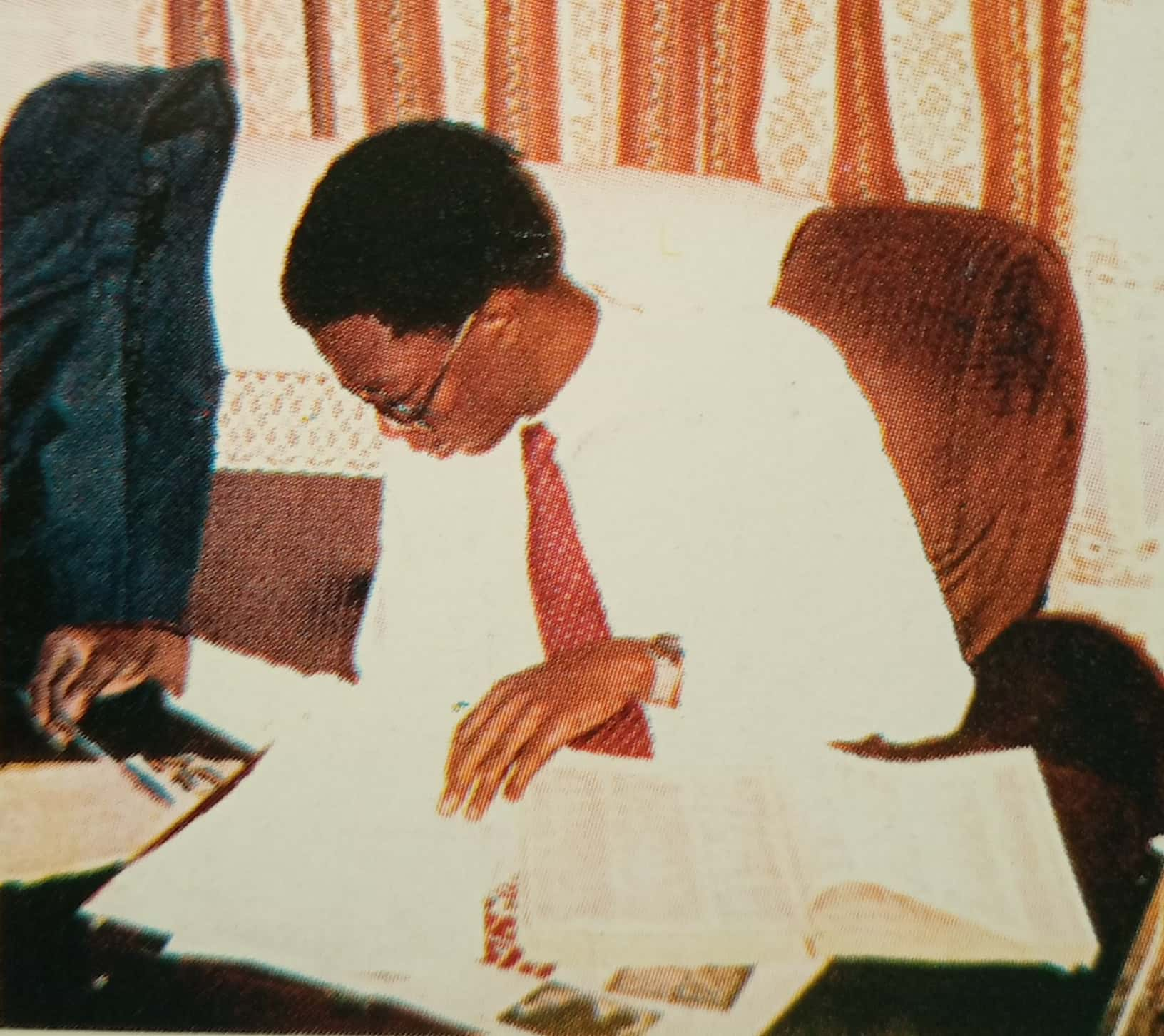
Gbenga Daniel at work at his residence, Abba Johnsoon Crescent, Ikeja, Lagos where Kresta Laurel took off

In 2016, he was elected president of, Nigerian-Finnish Business Council to succeed Ambassador Olusegun Olusola who died in 2012. The Nigerian-Finnish Business Council was established to foster business relations between Nigerian companies and their counterparts in Finland with the goal of encouraging trade and investment.

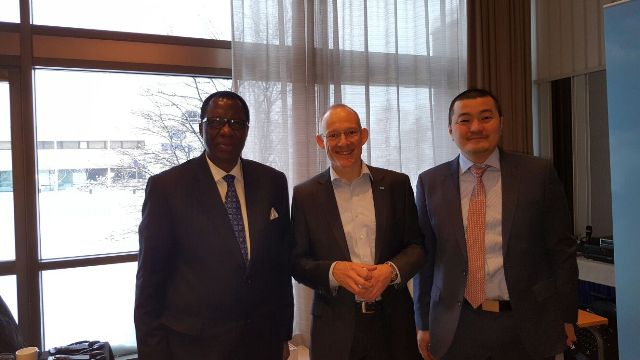
Gbenga Daniel in Finland shortly after his election as the President, Nigerian-Finnish Business Council, 2016

Daniel is a Fellow of the Nigerian Society of Engineers (FNSE), a Fellow of the Nigerian Academy of Engineering (FNAEng) and Fellow of the Institute of Directors (FIoD).

== Political career ==
=== Democratic struggle ===
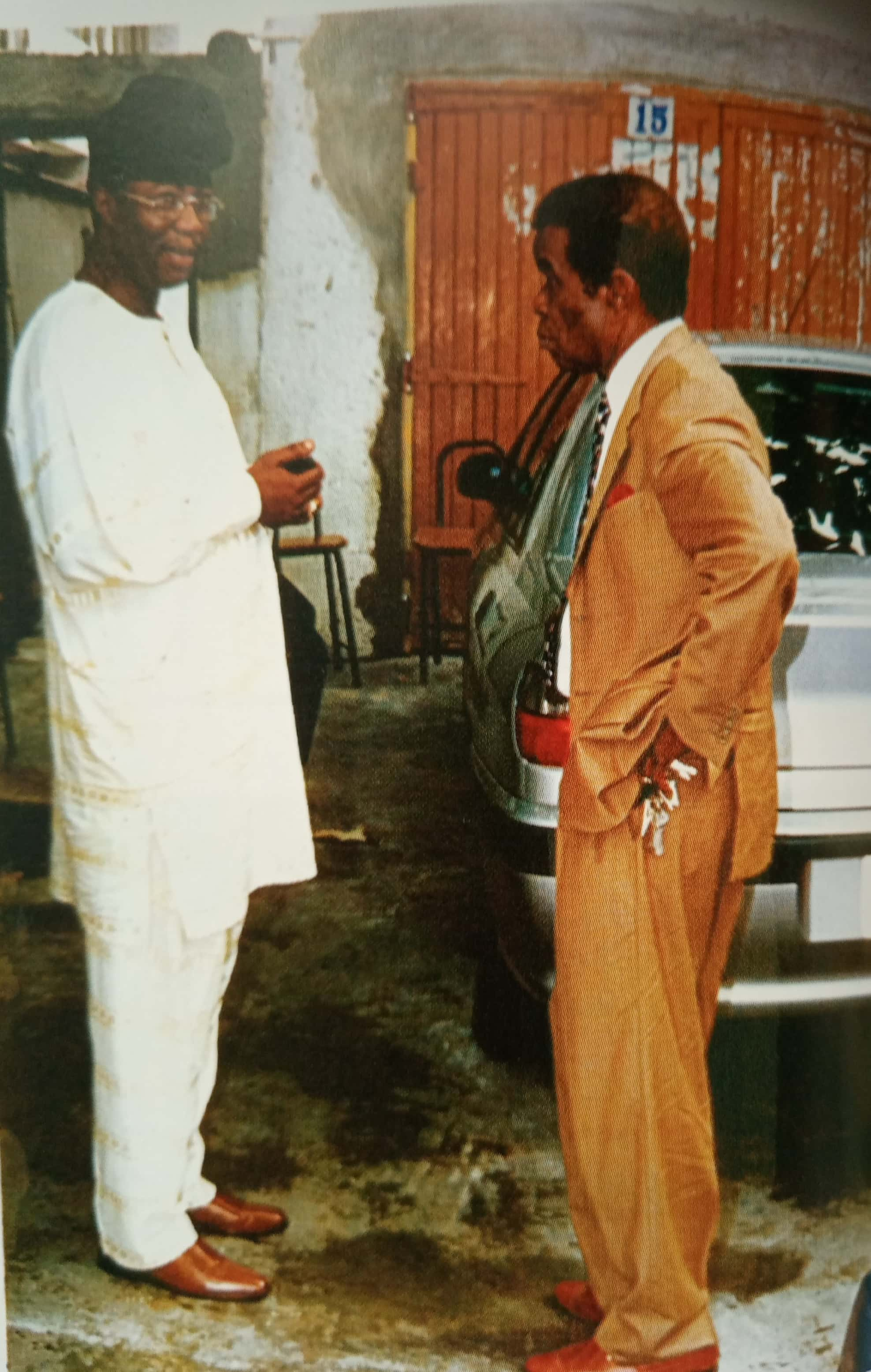
Gbenga Daniel with Pa Abraham Adesanya, the late Afenifere and Yoruba leader, 2002

As one of the youngest kitchen cabinet members of Chief Obafemi Awolowo, Daniel was in charge of the student wing of the Unity Party of Nigeria in 1978 but his sojourn in the UPN was short-lived after his father drove to the University of Lagos with a clear instruction to concentrate on his academic pursuit and leave politics. After graduation and establishment of Kresta Laurel, Gbenga Daniel joined the Yoruba social-cultural group Afenifere under the then leadership of Pa Abraham Adesanya. During the struggle against the military juntas and campaign for the reinstatement of the annulled 12 June election, Gbenga Daniel became one of the financiers of the National Democratic Coalition (Nigeria) NADECO providing supports to members who were fleeing the country to seek asylum abroad.

=== Governor of Ogun State ===
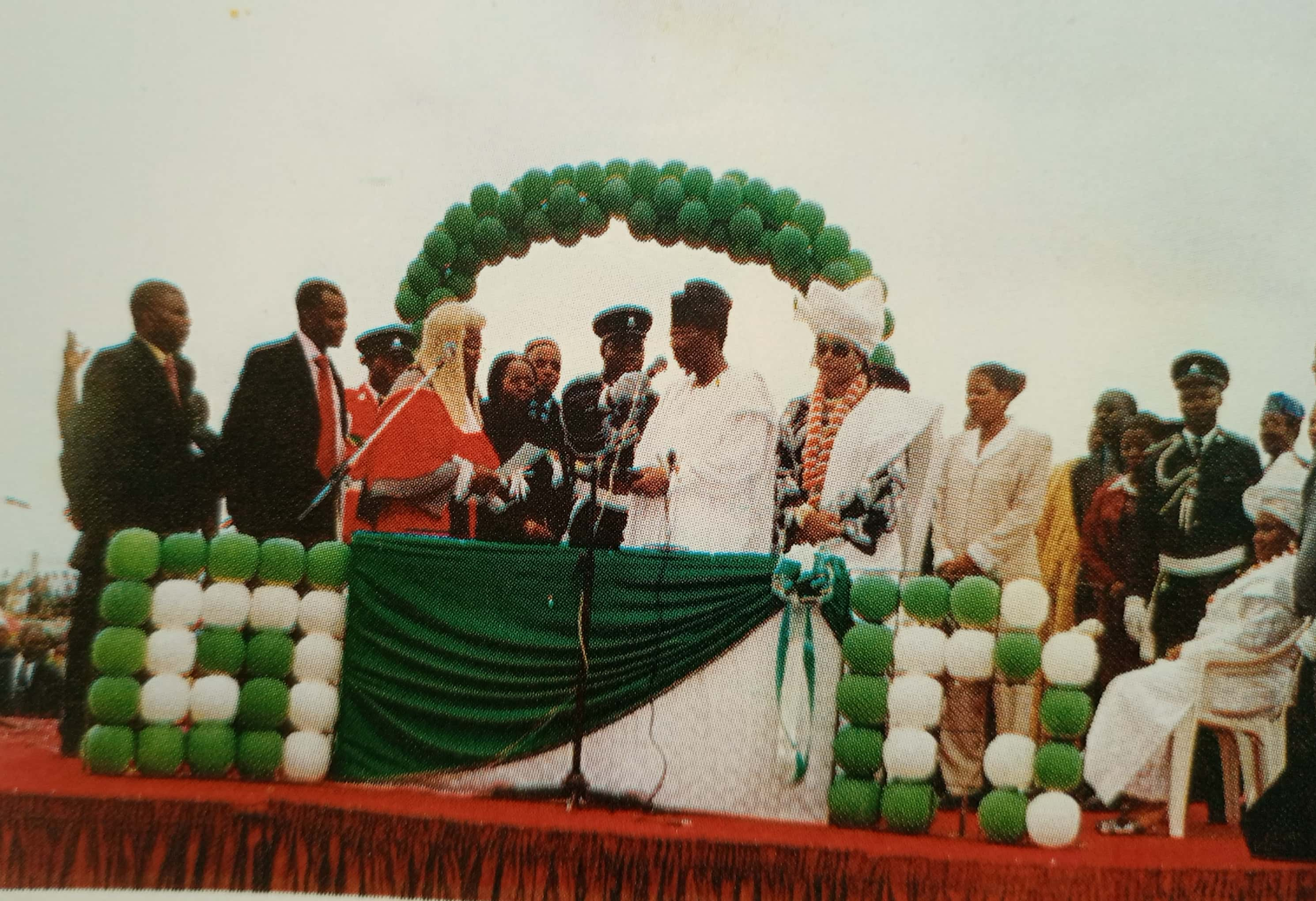
Gbenga Daniel taking the oath of office as the Governor of Ogun state in 2003.

Gbenga Daniel's campaign for the seat of the governor was described by political analysts as "electric" considering the fact that as a businessman, he defeated a sitting governor. His campaign was a revolution in the state in 2003 as he visited all the 236 wards of Ogun State, meeting with every stakeholder of every street and area in the state to sell his ideas. He received commendations for redefining campaign for political office in Nigeria.

Daniel was elected governor of Ogun State in the 2003 Ogun State gubernatorial election, running on the PDP platform beating the incumbent with 217,353 votes. His victory remains the biggest electoral victory in Ogun state. He scored 449,335 votes against the sitting governor who scored 231,982 votes recording the widest margin ever in Ogun state governorship race.

He acquired the chiefly title Otunba of the Egba and Ijebu clans of the state during the course of his first term. He was re-elected in April 2007. His April 2007 election was disputed by rival candidate Ibikunle Amosun of the All Nigeria People's Party (ANPP), but in August 2009 the Ogun State Election Petitions Tribunal dismissed the petition. He promoted entrepreneurship amongst young people through voracious youth development programmes. The Nigerian Youth Council of the state was massively empowered to help youths all over the state and many young people were appointed into notable political positions. Some of his other achievements while in office include building roads, recreational centres and stadiums in the three senatorial districts of the state, and setting up a University of Education. The Gateway International Stadium was a site of the 2009 FIFA U-17 World Cup which was held in Nigeria.

In February 2009, Daniel authorised reduction of fees at the State-owned Moshood Abiola Polytechnic to ₦7,000. This followed negotiations with the National Association of Nigerian Students after parents and students had protested recent increases to fees.

Daniel started the Ogun state agro cargo airport in Ilishan-Remo. An international air cargo port dedicated to offering direct export of agricultural products in Ogun state and Southwest Nigeria to the international community. The airport plan also shows the provision for regular carriage for passengers plane for international flights. He established three free trade zones in each of the senatorial districts in Ogun State. The Ogun Guangdong Free Trade Zone Limited, Igbesa, Ado-Odo/Ota Local Government Area; Olokola Free Trade Zone (OKFTZ); Olokola Deep Seaport and Kajola Free Trade Zone in Ifo.

=== Goodluck Jonathan campaign ===
In 2010 Daniel was appointed to lead the Goodluck Jonathan for president campaign in the Southwest, Nigeria. True to his assignment, Jonathan won the election in the southwest overwhelmingly in 2011 and became the first South-Southerner to ever rule over Nigeria.

=== PDP National Chairmanship ===
In 2017, Gbenga Daniel contested for the position of the National Chairman of the Peoples Democratic Party. His campaign was adjourned by many as the sturdiest campaign at the time. He visited the entire 36 states and FCT to campaign for a fresh start for the party. However, on the day of the convention, he submitted his letter of withdrawal after a consensus was reached by the party's leadership to zone the position to the South-South.

=== Atiku campaign director-general ===
In 2018, Atiku Abubakar announced the appointment of Gbenga Daniel as the director-general of his presidential campaign organisation. Daniel led the former vice-president to victory in the presidential primary of the PDP in Port Harcourt despite the predictions of bookmarkers.

=== Joining APC ===
In February 2021, Gbenga Daniel officially joined the All Progressive Congress (APC) after two years of leaving partisan politics. In his remark during the ceremonial handing over of the broom symbol of the party, Daniel stated that his main goal in politics is to foster national unity and the development of the country. He was received into the party by five governors namely Governor Dapo Abiodun of Ogun State, Ondo State Governor Rotimi Akeredolu, Governor Abubakar Atiku Bagudu of Kebbi State, Kano State Governor, Abdullahi Umar Ganduje and Niger State Governor, Abubakar Sani Bello.

Shortly after joining the APC, Daniel was appointed by the Caretaker/Extraordinary Convention Planning Committee (CECPC) to head the Media and Publicity Sub-Committee of the party as well as a member of the contact/strategy sub-committee.

He was named the chairman, Senate committee on navy of the 10th senate on 8 August 2023.

== Philanthropy and Political Academy ==
In 2002, Gbenga Daniel alongside his wife, Olufunke Daniel, established the Gateway Front Foundation (GFF), a nonprofit organisation with the focus to empower the lower and middle-class residents of Ogun State. The foundation gave scholarships to indigenes of Ogun state studying in various tertiary institutions in Nigeria and also donated library equipment to public schools in Ogun state as well as empowerment packages. The foundation also embarked on free eye surgery and medical treatment for the masses.

After his tenure as the governor of Ogun state, Gbenga Daniel established the Political Leadership Academy (POLA). A leadership and governance training Institute for the youth and emerging leaders in Nigeria. Since its creation, the institute has produced graduates who have excelled in various fields of public and private sectors. The likes of Tolu Ogunlesi, Femi Adesina, Rt. Hon. Remmy Hassan amongst others are alumnus of the institute.

== Awards and honours ==
=== International honour ===
- Honorary Georgia Citizen, Secretary of State, State of Georgia, USA
- Certificate of Recognition, City of Detroit, State of Michigan, USA
- Distinguished Visitor to Miami Dade County, (2010)

=== Honorary doctorate ===
- Doctor of Development Administration (DDA, Honoris Causa)
- Doctor of Agriculture (D. Agric, Honoris Causa),
- Doctor of Science, Engineering
- Doctor of Science, Engineering
- Doctor of Public Administration (Honoris Causa)

=== Honorary fellow ===
- Honorary Fellow of the National Postgraduate Medical College of Nigeria
- Fellow, Nigerian Institute of Safety Engineers
- Honorary Fellow, Chartered Institute of Arbitrators of Nigeria
- Honorary Fellow, Nigerian Society of Chemical Engineers
- Honorary Fellow, Nigerian Academy of Education
- Honorary Fellow, Nigerian Computer Society
- Honorary Fellow, National Postgraduate Medical College of Nigeria

=== Awards ===
- One of Nigeria's 100 most successful Businessmen (National Concord) – 1993
- MKO Abiola Leadership Prize – 2004
- Africa Leadership Prize for the Best Performed Governor for year 2003 – 2004
- City People Magazine Award for Best Performing Governor for 2003 – 2004
- Man of the Year (by the American Biographical Institute Inc) – 2004
- Best Performing Governor in Primary Education Development – 2005
- Corporate Governance Award of the Institute of Directors, Nigeria – 2005
- Zik Leadership Award, 2006.
- The Raymond Dokpesi: Electronic Media Award 2009.
- Best Governor in the Southwest, National Daily Newspaper
- Best Performing Governor, Heroes of Nigeria Project, African Leadership Magazine (2009)
- African Star Excellence Award in Enterprise Development, African Business Leadership Consortium (2010)
- Humanitarian Award, the Plight of Africa Foundation 2010
- Award of Excellence, Nigeria Medical Association, (Ogun State, Branch) 2005
- Award of Excellence, Shelter Watch Initiative 2006
- Award of Excellence, NYSC, Yewa North 2009
- Award of Excellence, Christian Association of Nigeria, Ogun State Chapter, 2006
- Merit Award for Excellence, Peace and Conflict Resolution, Owan Progressive Union, Abeokuta Branch.
- Award of Excellence, Ogun State Teaching Service Commission (2004)
- Best Telecom Supporting Governor, Nigerian Telecom Awards
- Good Governance Award by the Institute of Directors (2005)
- Distinguished Honours Award, College of Medicine, University of Ibadan
- Special Award, Lions Club District 404B (Nigeria (2007)
- Certificate of Merit Nigerian Society of Engineers (2004)
- Fellowship Award, Remo Chambers of Commerce, Industry, Mines and Agriculture
- Service Award, Africa-UK Youth Exchange Programme (2007)
- Supportive State Government Award, Nigerian Television Authority (NTA)
- Governor of the Year, FAME Achievers’ Award, 2005
- Best Governor in Nigeria Award, Nigeria Association of Nigerian Students
- Merit Award, United NATIONS Office on Drugs and Crimes 2005
- Award of Excellence NYSC, Sagamu (2017)
- Roll of Honours, University College Hospital, Ibadan (2017)
- Merit Award, Sigma Club, University of Ibadan, 2004
- Merit Award, Handball Association of Nigeria, 2003
- Examination Ethics Chief Master Marshall, Exam Ethics International (2009)
- Honours Award, Association of Advertising Practitioners of Nigeria (2003)
- Presidential Merit Award, National Institute of Marketing of Nigeria (2004)
- Award of Excellence, Molusi College, Ijebu Igbo (2009)
- Grand Commander of Nigerian Students, National Association of Nigerian Students
- Noble International Award, West African International Magazine (2004)
- Meritorious Award, Ohana Eze Ndi Igbo (2009)
- Golden Jubilee Prime Award, Nigerian Society of Engineers (2008)
- Gold Merit Award (NUJ) NAN Chapel b(2004
- Certificate of Appreciation International Council for Health, Physical Education, Recreation, Sports and Dance (ICHPER SD) (2003)

=== Patron-ship ===
- Patron, Nigerian Institute of Public Relations (2005)
- Patron, Nigeria Association of Special Education Teachers (NASET)
- Grand Patron, Police Community Committee Relation Committee, Ogun State Chapter (2009)
- Grand Patron, Christian Council of Nigeria, (2014)
- Grand Patron Gateway Readers’ Club
- Grand Patron, Nigerian Union of Journalists, Ogun State 2004
- Grand Patron of Boys Scout Movement in Nigeria
- Grand Patron of Red Cross International (Nigeria)
- Grand Patron of the Sports Writers’ Association of Nigeria (SWAN)

== Club membership ==
- Ikoyi Club
- Egbe Bobakeye of Ijebuland
- Lagos Country Club
- Lions Club International
- Metropolitan Club
- Ijebu Ode Club

== Religious titles ==
- Asiwaju of Remo Christians
- IMA Distinguished Man of the Year, Islamic Movement for Africa (IMA), (2004)
- Aare Musulumi of Ipokia Muslim Community
- Amuludun Adeen of Ikija, Abeokuta Muslim Community

== Chieftaincy titles ==
- FESOJOYE OF ILE-IFE
- THE AARE ASOLUDERO OF MAKUN, SAGAMU
- OTUNBA ADEOTI OF OMU, IJEBULAND
- OTUNBA OBALOFIN OF IJEBULAND
- AROLE OF REMOLAND
- OLU NLA OF EGBALAND,
- OGA NLA OF YEWALAND
- AARE AJIBOSIN OF OWU KINGDOM
- ASOJU OBA OF IJESALAND
- AEMENRE OF IULEHA, EDO STATE
- OKE-OSISI OF OBINUGWU, IMO STATE
- ENYI-DI-ORA-NMA 1 OF NDIGBO
- FIWAJOYE OF IPOKIA
- AKINROGUN OF IRO (ONIRO IPOKIA)
- AMAYEDERUN OF IRANIKEN, SAGAMU
- ASALU OF IBIDO, SAGAMU
- AKOREWOLU OF ILODO, IJEBU
- KINIUN OF ILARA, REMO
- OTUNBA MAJEOBAJE OF ILAPORU
- OGIDI OMO OF ODOLEWA
- OTUNBA ROJUGBUWA OF IJAGBA
- OTUNBA FIWAJOYE OF ILUPEJU LEGUNSEN, SAGAMU
- OTUNBA ATAYESE OF ODE REMO
- TAYESE OF OKE-ODANLAND
- JAGUNMOLU OF EJILA AWORILAND
- JIRADETO (ALATUNSE) OF ERE
- BAALORO OF OWODE
- APAGUNPOTE OF OBA OBAFEMI
- BOBASELU OF IRO
- GBOBANIYI OF IWOPIN
- MAYEGUN OF EGUN COMMUNITY IN IFO
- MAYETORO OF IFO
- MAYEGUN OF EWEKORO
- OTUNBA MAYEGUN OF IBIADE
- ADIMULA OF AIYEDE IN IKALELAND
- BABA EGBE JAGUNMOLU OF IKILE IJEBU
- OTUNBA ATUNLUSE OF ABIGI-WATERSIDE
- FESOJOYE OF ODO-ARAWA
- OTUNBA ATUNLUSE OF OGBERE
- OBALORO OF AIYEPE
- AKOGUN OF OKUN OWA
- AARE MULUDUN OF IJESHA-IJEBU
- ASIWAJU OF REMOLAND
- ATUNLUSE OF IDOFA
- BOBATOLU OF AIYETORO
- BAASELU OF JOGA-ORILE
- BOBAGUNWA OF GBAGURA
- BASHORUN OF EPE
- GBOBANIYI OF OKE-ONA
- OKANLOMO OF OWODE-YEWA
- AARE ATAYESE OF ISARA
- OMOLUABI OF IMASAYI
- APESIN OF OGERE
- AARE ORI ADE OF IPERU AKESAN
- BOBAGUNWA OF ILUGUN SOUTH
- ADIMULA OF KETULAND
- MAYEGUN OF KWARA, EKITILAND
- OTTUN QUADRI A OF AGBARALAND

== Publications ==
- Daniel in Lion's Den – Memoirs of Otunba Gbenga Daniel
- Otunba Gbenga Daniel – The Man, His World, His Visions
- Acts of Daniel (1)
- Acts of Daniel (2)
- Ogun State Political Economy
- Daniel's Development Profile in Ogun State
