= Olumide Osoba =

Nigerian politician

Olumide Babatunde Osoba

Member of the House of Representatives
- Incumbent
- Assumed office 2019
- Constituency: Abeokuta North/Obafemi Owode/Odeda Federal Constituency

Member of the House of Representatives
- In office 2007–2015
- Constituency: Abeokuta North/Obafemi Owode/Odeda Federal Constituency

Personal details
- Born: 15 April 1977 (age 49) Ogun State, Nigeria
- Party: All Progressives Congress
- Occupation: Politician

Olumide Babatunde Osoba is a Nigerian politician who is currently serving as a member representing the Abeokuta North/Obafemi Owode/Odeda Federal Constituency in the House of Representatives. Born on 15 April 1977, he hails from Ogun State and holds a Master’s degree. He was first elected into the House of Assembly in 2007. He was re-elected in 2011, 2019, and again in 2023 under the All Progressives Congress (APC). To celebrate the Eid-el-Kabir festival in 2025, he donated forty million naira to his constituents. This is in addition to his previous donations of cash and bags of rice in 2024.
