= Noimot Salako-Oyedele =

Nigerian politician (born 1966)

Her Excellency Noimot Salako-Oyedele
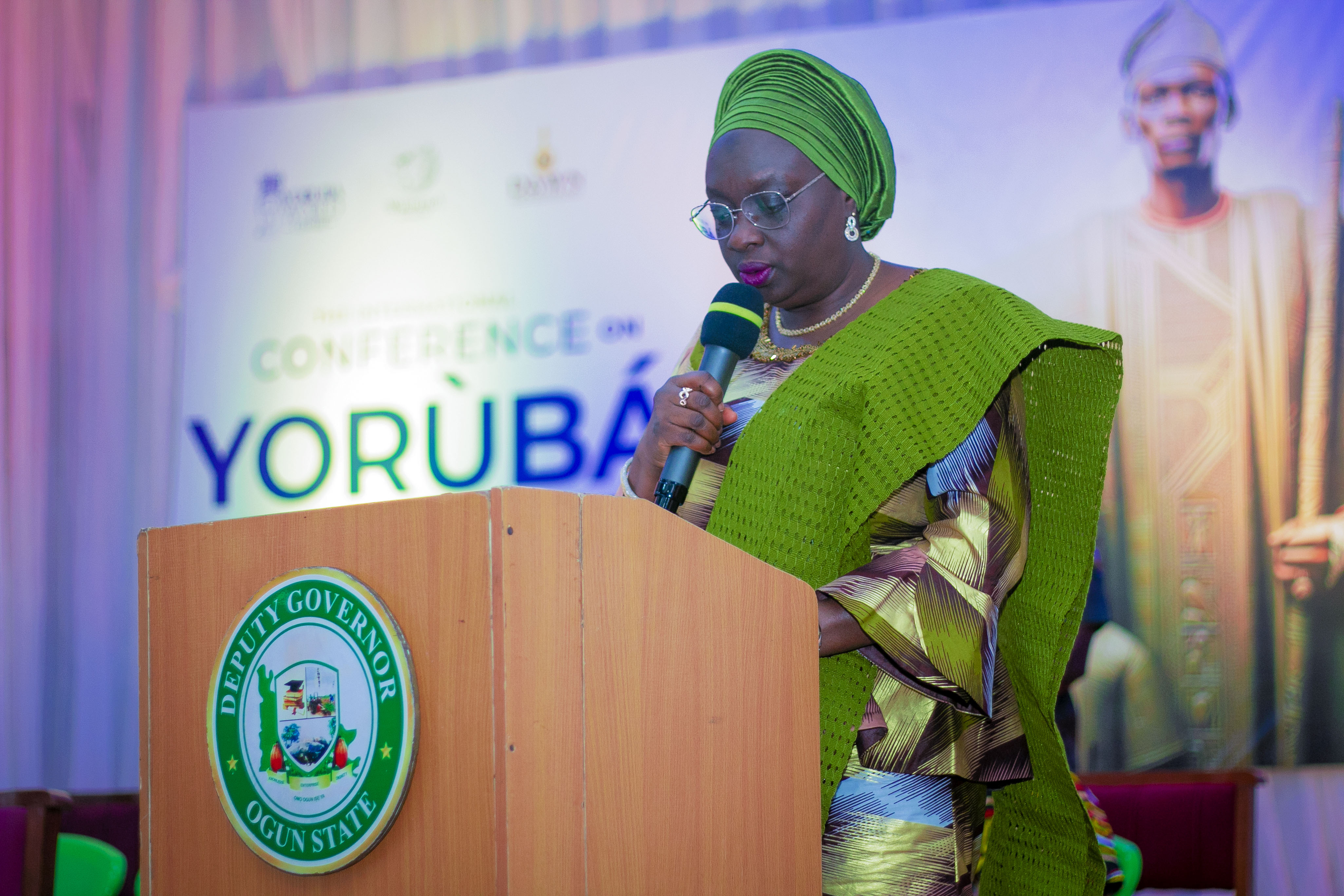

Deputy Governor of Ogun State
- Incumbent
- Assumed office 29 May 2019
- Governor: Dapo Abiodun
- Preceded by: Yetunde Onanuga

Personal details
- Born: Noimot Salako; 8 January 1966 (age 60)
- Party: All Progressives Congress
- Spouse: Kashif Bode Oyedele
- Occupation: Politician; engineer
- Profession: Real Estate Consultant

Noimot Salako-Oyedele (born 8 January 1966) is a Nigerian politician, public health engineer and real estate professional, who has served as the deputy governor of Ogun State since 2019. She emerged as deputy governor after winning the 2019 Ogun State gubernatorial election alongside Dapo Abiodun, under the platform of the All Progressive Congress.

== Early life ==
Noimot Salako was born on 8 January 1966 to the family of late Prof. Lateef Akinola Salako and Mrs Rahmat Adebisi Salako. She hails from Aworiland, Ota, in the Ado-Odo/Ota Local Government Area of Ogun State. Her father was a Nigerian academic who was professor emeritus of pharmacology and therapeutics at the University of Ibadan.

== Education ==
Salako-Oyedele holds a master's degree in Public Health Engineering from the Imperial College of Science & Technology London, UK, and a Bachelor of Science degree in Civil Engineering from the University of Lagos.

== Career ==
Salako-Oyedele started her career at the United Kingdom, where she served as a Graduate Engineer and Project Manager at Ove Arup & Partners between 1989 and 1995. Engineer Salako-Oyedele also served as managing director, NOS Nigeria Limited between 1995 and 2014. She became the managing director/chief executive officer between 2014 and 2015 at Glenwood Property Development Company Limited where she served as general manager business development. She became the acting managing director, Grenadines Homes Limited in 2015, a position she held till she ventured into partisan-politics and emerged as the Ogun State deputy governor.

== Politics ==
In March 2019, she was elected by the people of Ogun State to serve as deputy governor to His Excellency, Prince Dapo Abiodun.
