= Sefiu Adegbenga Kaka =

Nigerian politician (born 1952)

Senator for Ogun East
- In office 6 June 2011 – 6 June 2015
- Preceded by: Ramoni Mustapha
- Succeeded by: Buruji Kashamu

Deputy Governor of Ogun State
- In office 29 May 1999 – 29 May 2003
- Governor: Olusegun Osoba
- Succeeded by: Salimot Badru

Personal details
- Born: 14 May 1952 (age 73)
- Party: All Progressives Congress (2013–present)
- Other political affiliations: Alliance for Democracy (before 2006); Action Congress of Nigeria (2006–2013)
- Occupation: Politician

Sefiu Adegbenga Kaka (born 14 May 1952) is a Nigerian politician who served as the senator representing Ogun East senatorial district from 2011 to 2015. He previously served as deputy governor of Ogun State from 1999 to 2003.

== Early life and education ==
Sefiu Adegbenga Kaka was born on 14 May 1952, to a pious Muslim family, and entered Ijebu Muslim College in 1968. Kaka was Deputy Governor of Ogun State from 1999 to 2003, during the governorship of Olusegun Osoba.

== Senatorial career ==
In the 9 April 2011 election, Kaka was elected Senator of Ogun East with 76,543 votes, ahead of the People's Democratic Party (PDP) candidate Toheeb Odunowo with 52,613 votes and the Peoples Party of Nigeria (PPN) candidate, Prince Abiodun Odusanya, with 46,148 votes.
