= Olabisi Onabanjo =

Nigerian politician (1927 – 1990)

Governor of Ogun State
- In office 1 October 1979 – 31 December 1983
- Deputy: Sesan Soluade
- Preceded by: Harris Eghagha
- Succeeded by: Oladipo Diya

Personal details
- Born: 12 February 1927 Lagos, Nigeria
- Died: 14 April 1990 (aged 63)
- Education: Regent Street Polytechnic

Chief Victor Olabisi Onabanjo (12 February 1927 – 14 April 1990) was a Nigerian journalist and politician who served as governor of Ogun State from October 1979 to December 1983, during the Nigerian Second Republic. He was of Ijebu extraction.

== Background ==
Onabanjo was born in 1927 in Lagos. He was educated at the Baptist Academy in Lagos and at the Regent Street Polytechnic in the United Kingdom, where he studied journalism between 1950 and 1951. He worked as a journalist for several years before becoming a full-time politician. His column "Aiyekooto" (a Yoruba word meaning "parrot," a creature known in Yoruba mythology for telling the plain truth) appeared in the Daily Service and Daily Express newspapers between 1954 and 1962.

== Political career ==
Onabanjo was elected chairman of the Ijebu Ode Local Government Area in 1977 under the tutelage of Chief Obafemi Awolowo. He was subsequently elected governor of Ogun State in October 1979 on the Unity Party of Nigeria platform. He was known as an unpretentious and plain-speaking man, and his administration of Ogun State was considered a model at the time and later.

On 13 May 1982, he commissioned Ogun Television. The Ogun State University, founded on 7 July 1982, was renamed Olabisi Onabanjo University on 29 May 2001 in his memory. He established the Abraham Adesanya Polytechnic. General Oladipo Diya, who became military governor in 1983, closed the school down, and it remained closed until it was reopened after the return to democracy in 1999.

== Later career ==
When General Muhammadu Buhari took power in a military coup, Onabanjo was thrown in jail for several years. After his eventual release, he returned to journalism, publishing his "Aiyekooto" column in the Nigerian Tribune from 1987 to 1989. Onabanjo died on 14 April 1990. Selected articles from his column were published in a book in 1991.

== Bibliography ==
- Onabanjo, Victor Olabisi (1991). Adenaike, Felix A. (ed.). Aiyekooto. Syndicated Communications Ltd, Ibadan. ISBN 978-31115-0-7.
