= Ibikunle Amosun =

Nigerian politician (born 1958)

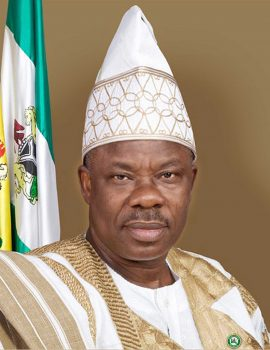

Senator for Ogun Central
- In office 11 June 2019 – 11 June 2023
- Preceded by: Lanre Tejuoso
- Succeeded by: Shuaibu Salisu
- In office 3 June 2003 – 5 June 2007
- Preceded by: Femi Okurounmu
- Succeeded by: Iyabo Obasanjo-Bello

Governor of Ogun State
- In office 29 May 2011 – 29 May 2019
- Deputy: Segun Adesegun; Yetunde Onanuga
- Preceded by: Gbenga Daniel
- Succeeded by: Dapo Abiodun

Personal details
- Born: 25 January 1958 (age 68) Nigeria
- Party: All Progressives Congress (2013–present)
- Other political affiliations: Peoples Democratic Party (1998–2006); All Nigeria Peoples Party (2006–2008); Action Congress of Nigeria (2008–2013)
- Spouse: Olufunso Amosun
- Children: 3

Ibikunle Amosun (born 25 January 1958) is a Nigerian politician, former governor of Ogun State and two-term senator of the Federal Republic of Nigeria. He first served as an elected senator for Ogun Central district of Ogun State, Nigeria from June 2003 to June 2007, and reelected in 2019. After an unsuccessful bid for governor of Ogun State in April 2007, he was elected governor of the state on the Action Congress of Nigeria (ACN) platform in 2011. He contested again for a second term as governor under the All Progressives Congress and after winning the election, was sworn into office on 29 May 2015.

== Background ==
Amosun was born on 25 January 1958 to a Muslim family. He attended primary school at African Church Primary school in Abeokuta (1965–1970), and then African Church Grammar school, Abeokuta (1971–1977). He then went to Ogun State Polytechnic, graduating with a Higher National Diploma (HND) in 1983.

Amosun gained an Associate membership of the Institute of Chartered Accountants of Nigeria (ICAN) in 1990. He became a fellow of the Institute in 1996. He also became an Associate member of the Chartered Institute of Taxation of Nigeria (1998).

Amosun began his career as an audit trainee with Lanre Aremu & Co. (Chartered Accountants) 1984. Later he joined XtraEdge Consulting as a managing consultant. From 1990, he was Principal partner of Ibikunle Amosun & Co. (Chartered Accountants) in Lagos.

Amosun went to the University of Westminster in London, where he acquired a Master of Arts in International Finance in 2000.

== Political career ==
In April 2003, Amosun was elected to the senatorial seat of Ogun Central Senatorial district. He was an unsuccessful candidate to become Governor of Ogun State in April 2007, running on the All Nigeria People's Party (ANPP) platform, but was defeated by Gbenga Daniel.

He disputed the result, but in August 2009 the Ogun State Election Petitions Tribunal dismissed the petition.

Amosun was the candidate of the Action Congress of Nigeria (ACN) for April 2011 Ogun State gubernatorial election. A report in the Nigerian Tribune on 12 February 2011 quoted his media aide as saying he had switched to the Congress for Progressive Change (CPC), but this was denied by ACN officials.

Amosun won the 26 April election running on the ACN platform with 377,489 votes. Adetunji Olurin of the People's Democratic Party (PDP) polled 188,698 votes and Gboyega Isiaka of the PPN came third with 137,051 votes.

In 2015, Amosun contested for a second term as governor. He chose, Yetunde Onanuga, as his deputy governor of the state governor. He had to find a new running mate as his previous deputy governor had defected to an opposition party. Amosun chose Onanuga who had been working in the Lagos State Ministry of Environment over three other possible candidates. On 29 May 2019 Amosun handed over to another member from his political party who is perceived to be his successor, Dapo Abiodun after completing the constitutional maximum two terms of eight years as a governor. However, he was elected as the senator for the Ogun central senatorial district at the National Assembly.

== Controversy ==
On 24 June 2019 Premium Times reported in an exclusive story that Ibikunle Amosun illegally purchased and imported four million rounds of ammunition, 1,000 units of AK47 assault rifles, 1,000 units of bulletproof vests and an armoured personnel carrier (APC) into Nigeria as the Governor of Ogun State without obtaining necessary approvals from the Office of the National Security Adviser and in violation of the Nigeria Firearms Act. The report generated a strong reaction from Nigerians with civil society organisations, citizens across the country and Ogun State chapter of his political party calling for his immediate arrest.

In a reaction to the report, Ibikunle Amosun stated that he got the necessary approval for the arms and ammunition that he imported as well as an end-user certificate from the office of the National Security Adviser, stating that it is a common practice by Governors in Nigeria to have an armoury. In a swift response, twenty State Governors in Nigeria denied having an armoury in the Government Office or House.

In a reaction to Ibikunle Amosun's statement, the Nigerian Government via the Budget Office of the Federation stated that Amosun only got approval for the importation of an armoured personnel carrier and not for AK-47 rifles and ammunition. In another exclusive report by Premium Times showing documents from the offices of National Security Adviser, the Nigeria Customs Service, Federal Ministry of Finance and Ogun State Government, Premium Times reported that Ibikunle Amosun did not get approval for the ammunitions and weapons he brought into Nigeria.

== Awards and honours ==
Amosun received several awards.

1. In October 2012, he was awarded as the Best Security Conscious State Governor in West Africa by Security Watch Africa in Accra, Ghana. The award was presented by the chairperson, board of trustees, Security Watch Africa, Dr Theresa Oppory Beeko
2. In September 2013, he received the Investment Development Icon Award for 2013 from African Leadership magazine in New York.
3. In November 2013, Businessday Newspaper in Lagos gave him the Good Governor Award as the governor of the fastest growing state economy.
4. In September 2014, President Goodluck Ebele Jonathan conferred on him the status of Commander of the Order of the Niger (CON).
5. He received the Governor of the Year award for 2016 for "outstanding achievement in leadership and infrastructural development". The award was conferred on him by the Nigeria Union of Journalists (N.U.J) President, Abdulwaheed Odusile at the Award Night and Investiture of the Governor of the Year to mark N.U.J. at sixty-two.

== See also ==
- List of governors of Ogun State
