= Dapo Abiodun =

Nigerian politician (born 1960)

His Excellency Dapo Abiodun MFR, CON
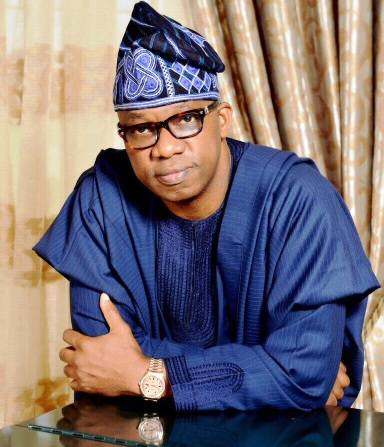

Governor of Ogun State
- Incumbent
- Assumed office 29 May 2019
- Deputy: Noimot Salako-Oyedele
- Preceded by: Ibikunle Amosun

Personal details
- Born: Adedapo Oluseun Abiodun; 29 May 1960 (age 66) Iperu, Ogun State, Western Region, Colonial Nigeria (now in Ogun State, Nigeria)
- Party: All Progressives Congress (APC)
- Spouse: Bamidele Oduye (m. 1990)
- Occupation: Politician; businessman

Adedapo Oluseun Abiodun MFR CON (born 29 May 1960) is a Nigerian businessman and politician, who has served as Governor of Ogun State since May 2019. Currently a member of the All Progressives Congress, Abiodun first entered politics during the aborted Abacha transition in 1998 and remained active in politics until being elected governor in 2019.

Born in Iperu, Ogun State in 1960, Abiodun eventually became an accountant for several years before entering business in the 1990s. Alongside a business career, Abiodun entered electoral politics and was the board chairman of the Corporate Affairs Commission. Prior to his assumption of political office in 2019, he was the managing director of Heyden Petroleum and the founder of First Power Limited. Abiodun was elected to his first term as governor by a small margin then was re-elected by a similarly slight margin in 2023.

== Early life ==
Abiodun was born on 29 May 1960 in Iperu, Ogun State, Ogun State, to the royal family of Iperu. He was born into the family of Dr. Emmanuel Abiodun and Mrs. Victoria Abiodun from Iperu Remo, in Ogun East senatorial district.

Abiodun attended Christ's School Ado Ekiti in 1972, St. Joseph's College, Ondo, in 1977, and later Ondo High School, in 1978.

Abiodun studied Civil Engineering at the University of Ife (now Obafemi Awolowo University), Ile-Ife, Osun State, and in 1986 graduated with a BBA in Accounting from Kennesaw State University in Atlanta, Georgia.

== Career ==
Abiodun began his professional journey as a Cost Accountant at Glock Inc. in USA from 1989 to 1991. Upon returning to Nigeria, he ventured into entrepreneurship and became the Chairman of Crestar Hydrocarbons Limited, OMS-Heyden Exploration and Production Limited, Heyden Petroleum Ltd (HPL), Alarmnet, Innovative Ventures Limited, and First Power Limited. From 2012 to 2019, he was the Chairman of the Depot and Petroleum Product Marketers' Association (DAPPMA).

== Public sector ==
Abiodun's' political career started in 1998 when he contested and won the Ogun East Senatorial seat on the platform of the defunct United Nigeria Congress Party but the victory was truncated due to the aborted third republic.

He later joined the Peoples Democratic Party in 1999 as a founding member on which platform he contested the primaries for the governorship ticket in Ogun State in 2002 where he emerged as the runner-up to the winner of the ticket, who eventually won in the general elections.

He contested in the 2015 general elections, representing the All Progressive Congress (APC) for Ogun East Senatorial District but was unsuccessful and in 2018, he was appointed by President Muhammadu Buhari as the Chairman of Corporate Affairs Commission (CAC)

In 2019, he contested and won the governorship ticket of the APC in Ogun State general elections and became the 5th elected Governor of Ogun State. Abiodun won 12 of the 20 local government areas.

On assumption of office, the implementation of Building Our Future Together Agenda began and is anchored on Five Development Pillars codenamed I.S.E.Y.A (Infrastructure, Social well being and welfare, Education, Youth empowerment and job creation and Agriculture).

In 2023, Abiodun released 49 prison inmates who had already served more than 20 years of their respective prison sentences. Some of the prisoners were either elderly or had health problems. He also commuted the death sentences for 3 prisoners to life imprisonment.

On 8 March 2023, he was re-elected governor under the platform of the All Progressives Congress (APC) during the 2023 Ogun State gubernatorial election.

On 18 May 2026, Abiodun clinched the ticket of Ogun East Senatorial District.

== Controversies ==
Ahead of the 2019 gubernatorial election, reporting from the TheCable detailed the alleged falsification of Abiodun's certificates by noting the discrepancies between Abiodun's election defeating Ladi Adebutu of the People's Democratic Party (PDP) and Biyi Otegbeye of the African Democratic Congress (ADC).

Abiodun's sworn documentation from his Senate candidacy in 2015, the sworn documentation from gubernatorial candidacy, and his company website bio. The discrepancies put Abiodun's eligibility under question, as doubts about if Abiodun had completed the mandatory year of National Youth Service Corps service led to legal challenges to his candidacy. In his defense, Abiodun stated that he had never claimed to finish his degree at the Obafemi Awolowo University and attempted to dismiss the controversy as political "mudslinging." Nevertheless, the challenges to Abiodun's candidacy continued after the election with tribunal proceedings largely dominated by attempts to contest the veracity of Abiodun's documentation. In its ruling affirming Abiodun's victory, the tribunal stated that the petitions failed to prove that Abiodun had committed certificate fraud.

As a result of the Pandora Papers leaks, the Premium Times reported on Abiodun's involvement in two offshore companies known tax haven, the British Virgin Islands. The report noted that Abiodun owned and was the sole director of both Marlowes Trading Corporation and Heyden Petroleum Limited in apparent violation of the Code of Conduct Bureau and Tribunal Act as neither company was declared when Abiodun was elected governor. Abiodun himself avoided questions on the topic but an associate of Abiodun claimed that the governor had meant to dissolve the companies but didn't notice that they had not been dissolved yet.

In 2022, Sahara Reporters published the criminal record of Abiodun's arrested in 1986 for credit card fraud, petty theft, and check forgery in addition to injuring a police officer in an attempt to resist arrest in Miami-Dade County in the United States under the pseudonym "Shawn Michael Davids." Although the arrest had been previously exposed — with it being included in the challenge to Abiodun's candidacy in 2019 – however, the documentation had not been released publicly. Abiodun allies and lawyers claimed that the arrest could not impact his eligibility to run for office.

== Awards ==
Abiodun has obtained a variety of awards as a governor, some of which include:

- 2021 Best State Governor with the Most Improved State in Security Infrastructure by Business Day Newspaper
- 2020 Best Governor in Agriculture by the Nigerian Agriculture Awards (NAA)
- 2022 Best Governor in Infrastructure in the South West by the Nigeria Union of Journalists (NUJ) B zone
- 2022 Forbes Award as the Best of Africa Governor in Industrial Revolution
- 2023 Best Governor in Housing Delivery by the Nigerian Housing Award

== Personal life ==
Abiodun is married to his childhood sweetheart, Bamidele, and they have five children.

In 2017, their son, Gbemiga Abiodun (also known as DJ Olu) who was 25, was found dead in his car along with a friend. The cause of death is not known.

In October 2023 Abiodun set up a scholarship scheme for 550 students in memory of his son.

== See also ==
- List of governors of Ogun State
