= 2023 Ogun State gubernatorial election =

2023 gubernatorial election in Ogun State, Nigeria

- 18 March 2023
- Registered: 2,688,305
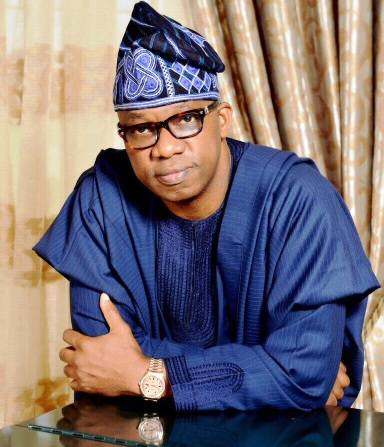

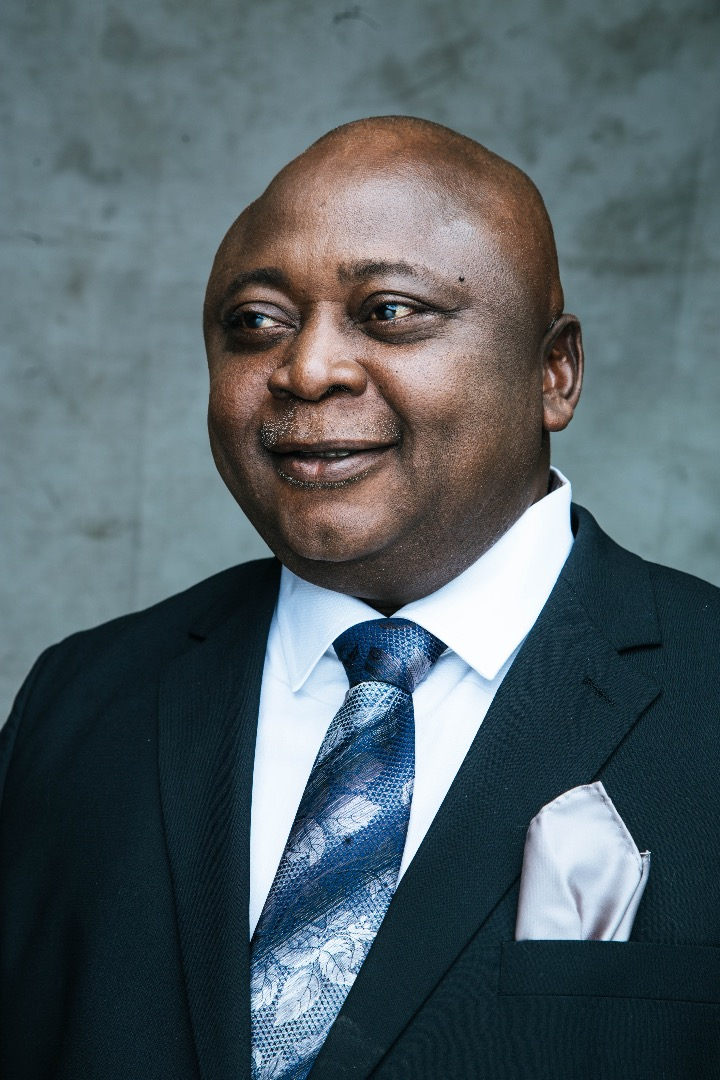
			ADC
Nominee	Dapo Abiodun	Ladi Adebutu	Olubiyi Otegbeye
Party	APC	PDP	ADC
Running mate	Noimot Salako-Oyedele	Adekunle Akinlade	Olatunde Awonuga
Popular vote	276,298	262,383	94,754
Percentage	42.83%	40.67%	14.69%
- LGA results Abiodun: 30–40% 40–50% 50–60% Adebutu: 40–50% 50–60% 60–70%
Governor before election
Dapo Abiodun
APC
Elected Governor
Dapo Abiodun
APC

The 2023 Ogun State gubernatorial election took place on 18 March 2023, to elect the Governor of Ogun State, concurrent with elections to the Ogun State House of Assembly as well as twenty-seven other gubernatorial elections and elections to all other state houses of assembly. The election — which was postponed from its original 11 March date — was held three weeks after the presidential election and National Assembly elections. Incumbent APC Governor Dapo Abiodun won election to a second term by a 2.2% margin of victory over PDP nominee Oladipupo Olatunde Adebutu, a former House of Representatives member.

The primaries, scheduled for between 4 April and 9 June 2022, resulted in Abiodun being renominated by the All Progressives Congress on 26 May while for the Peoples Democratic Party, two separate parallel primaries were held on 25 May with one primary nominating Adebutu while the other primary picked Segun Sowunmi. The national PDP recognized the Adebutu-won primary in July 2022; however, that primary was annulled by a Federal High Court on 28 September. A Court of Appeal judgment on 28 November overturned the High Court ruling, reinstating Adebutu as the legitimate PDP nominee.

On 21 March, INEC declared Abiodun as the victor with official totals showing him winning about 276,000 votes (~43% of the vote) to defeat Adebutu with about 263,000 votes (~41% of the vote) and Otegbeye, who won around 95,000 votes (~15% of the vote). Due to alleged irregularities, Adebutu rejected the results and filed a challenge at the electoral tribunal. The legal case eventually reached the Supreme Court, which upheld the election of Abiodun in a January 2024 judgment.

== Electoral system ==
The governor of Ogun State is elected using a modified two-round system. To be elected in the first round, a candidate must receive the plurality of the vote and over 25% of the vote in at least two-thirds of state local government areas. If no candidate passes this threshold, a second round will be held between the top candidate and the next candidate to have received a plurality of votes in the highest number of local government areas.

== Background ==
Ogun State is a small, Yoruba-majority southwestern state with vast natural areas and significant economic growth but facing a lack of affordable housing, an underdeveloped agricultural sector, and brain drain.

Politically, the 2019 elections were categorized as a reassertion of the state APC's control in the wake of a party rift that led allies of outgoing Governor Ibikunle Amosun to defect to the APM. Despite the defections, Abiodun won the gubernatorial race for the APC by a narrow 3% margin and the party won a majority in the House of Assembly. Federally, the APC swept all three Senate seats and won most House of Representatives seats. For the presidency, Ogun was won by APC nominee Muhammadu Buhari with about 50% but swung slightly towards the PDP. During the 2019–2023 term, the majority of APM elected officials returned to the APC, giving the party boosts in both the federal and state Houses.

Ahead of Abiodun's term, his policy focuses included security, public service and local government reform, unemployment, education, infrastructure, healthcare, and agriculture development as well as a pledge to complete in-progress projects from Amosun's administration. In terms of his performance, Abiodun was commended for proactive approaches to unemployment and the economy along with improving infrastructure in long-neglected communities along the Lagos State border but was criticized for the months-long delay in forming a cabinet, breaking a campaign promise to establish a university, and the failure to pay state government workers' co-operative deductions for over a year. Abiodun also came over fire after the Pandora Papers leaks revealed that he was illegally involved in two British Virgin Islands-based offshore companies.

== Primary elections ==
The primaries, along with any potential challenges to primary results, were to take place between 4 April and 3 June 2022 but the deadline was extended to 9 June.

=== All Progressives Congress ===
Analysts viewed the APC gubernatorial primary as a battle between factions within the Ogun APC, namely: the faction led by former Governor and current Ogun Central Senator Ibikunle Amosun, former Governor Olusegun Osoba's group, former Governor Gbenga Daniel's faction, incumbent Governor Dapo Abiodun's bloc, and the group of Lagos West Senator Solomon Olamilekan Adeola. The two most powerful groups appeared to be the Abiodun and Amosun factions, the same groups from the 2019 primary where Abiodun prevailed and much of Amosun's faction temporarily left to run under the Allied Peoples Movement. Tensions between the factions reached a head in late 2021 when Amosun's faction held a parallel party conference and elected separate leadership to Abiodun's bloc; but national APC leadership later accepted the results of the Abiodun factional congress as legitimate. Despite this setback, Amosun's allies continued their efforts to unseat Abiodun as Adekunle Akinlade and Ramoni Olalekan Mustapha looked set to challenge him until Mustapha joined Abiodun's faction in May 2022. Akinlade, who lost the 2019 primary to Abiodun before defecting and losing in the general as well, continued his campaign with pundits casting the primary as a potentially defining matchup between Amosun and Abiodun.

On 20 April 2022, the APC National Executive Committee announced the party's schedule for gubernatorial primaries, setting its expression of interest form price at ₦10 million and nomination form price at ₦40 million with a 50% nomination form discount for candidates younger than 40 while women and candidates with disabilities get free nomination forms. Forms were to be sold from 26 April to 6 May until the deadline was later extended to 10 May then 12 May. After the submission of nomination forms by 13 May, candidates were screened by a party committee on 14 and 15 May while 16 May was the date for the screening appeal process. Ward congresses and LGA congresses were set for between 7 and 9 May to elect delegates for the primary. Candidates approved by the screening process advanced to a primary set for 26 May, in concurrence with other APC gubernatorial primaries; challenges to the result could be made the next day.

In the days before the primary, Abiodun's opponents rejected the process that led to the election of delegates. They claimed their respective supporters were denied the opportunity to vote despite purchasing forms for the delegates elections. The aspirants rejected the final delegates list and criticized the appointed primary committee chairman as biased. On the primary date, the six candidates contested an indirect primary at the MKO Abiola Stadium that ended with Abiodun winning unanimously. In his acceptance speech, Abiodun thanked the state and vowed to continue the work of his first term. About a month later, a number of Amosun allies led by Akinlade defected to the PDP with Akinlade becoming the party's deputy gubernatorial nominee. Around the same time, incumbent Deputy Governor Noimot Salako-Oyedele was renominated as the APC deputy gubernatorial nominee.

==== Nominated ====
- Dapo Abiodun: Governor (2019–present)
  - Running mate—Noimot Salako-Oyedele: Deputy Governor (2019–present)

==== Eliminated in primary ====
- Adekunle Akinlade: former House of Representatives member for Egbado South/Ipokia (2015–2019) and 2019 APC gubernatorial candidate and APM gubernatorial nominee (defected after to the primary to become PDP deputy gubernatorial nominee)
- Remi Bakare
- Owodunni Opayemi: businessman
- Biyi Otegbeye: businessman
- Modele Sarafa-Yusuf: entrepreneur and former broadcast journalist

==== Declined ====
- Solomon Olamilekan Adeola: Senator for Lagos West (2015–present), former House of Representatives member for Alimosho (2011–2015), and former Lagos State House of Assembly member for Alimosho II (2003–2011)
- Gboyega Nasir Isiaka: 2019 ADC gubernatorial nominee, 2015 PDP gubernatorial nominee, and former Governor Gbenga Daniel administration aide
- Ramoni Olalekan Mustapha: Senator for Ogun East (2007–2011; 2019–present)

==== Results ====
APC primary results
Party	Candidate	Votes	%
APC	Dapo Abiodun	1,168	100.00%
APC	Other candidates	0	0.00%
Total votes		1,168	100.00%
Invalid or blank votes		2	N/A
Turnout		1,170	Unknown

=== People's Democratic Party ===
Analysts viewed the PDP gubernatorial primary as another contest between the two major internal party groupings, the faction led by former MHR Oladipupo Olatunde Adebutu and the other faction being the remnants of late Senator Buruji Kashamu's supporters. While Adebutu spent 2021 and early 2022 preparing for another gubernatorial run, some in the Kashamu camp backed Segun Sowunmi's candidacy.

On 16 March 2022, the national PDP announced its gubernatorial primaries' schedule, setting its expression of interest form price at ₦1 million and the nomination form price at ₦20 million with a 50% discount for candidates between 25 and 30. Forms were to be sold until 1 April but the party later extended the deadline four times before reaching a final deadline of 22 April. After the submission of nomination forms by 25 April, candidates were screened by a party committee on 28 April while 2 May was the rescheduled date for the screening appeal process. Ward congresses were set for 29 April and LGA congresses were rescheduled for 10 May to elect delegates for the primary. Candidates approved by the screening process advanced to a primary set for 25 May, in concurrence with all other PDP gubernatorial primaries; challenges to the result could be made in the following days.

The weeks before the primary were dominated by party infighting and lawsuits between the factions. On the primary date, two separate factional primaries were held with one faction holding a primary at the Olusegun Obasanjo Presidential Library while the faction held a primary at the state Nigeria Union of Journalists secretariat in Abeokuta. While the NUJ secretariat primary was peacefully held and resulted in Segun Sowunmi's victory, the presidential library primary was marred by violence and gunshots as supporters of Oladipupo Olatunde Adebutu and Jimi Lawal clashed over the delegate list; eventually Lawal walked out in protest and the election ended in Adebutu winning unanimously. After the results were released, Lawal called for the primary to be annulled in a letter to the national PDP. A few days after the primaries, the PDP National Working Committee issued a certificate of return to Adebutu but Sowunmi continued to contend that his primary is legitimate. For his part, Adebutu began a reconciliation process in early June before picking Adekunle Akinlade as his running mate a month later. Despite the process, Lawal continued with his lawsuit to annul the primary; the case was initially successful and the primary was annulled on 27 September by a Federal High Court based on irregularities in violation of the Electoral Act. However, a Court of Appeal in Ibadan overturned the High Court ruling and reinstated Adebutu as nominee. In January, a Supreme Court panel affirmed the Court of Appeal ruling in favor of Adebutu.

==== Nominated ====
- Oladipupo Olatunde Adebutu: former House of Representatives member for Remo/Shagamu/Ikenne (2015–2019) and 2019 PDP gubernatorial candidate
  - Running mate—Adekunle Akinlade: 2023 APC gubernatorial candidate, former House of Representatives member for Egbado South/Ipokia (2015–2019), and 2019 APC gubernatorial candidate and APM gubernatorial nominee

==== Eliminated ====
- Abimbola Abodunrin
- Jimi Lawal: former Kaduna State Governor Nasir Ahmad el-Rufai aide and 2019 APC gubernatorial candidate
- Segun Sowunmi: Atiku Abubakar 2019 presidential campaign spokesman

==== Withdrew ====
- David Bamgbose: 2015 APGA gubernatorial nominee (defected after the primary to obtain the PRP nomination)

==== Results ====
PDP presidential library primary results
Party	Candidate	Votes	%
PDP	Ladi Adebutu	714	100.00%
PDP	Other candidates	0	0.00%
Total votes		714	100.00%

Invalid NUJ secretariat primary results
Candidates' vote share
1. ~~Segun Sowunmi~~ (92.5%)
2. ~~Jimi Lawal~~ (5.01%)
3. ~~Ladi Adebutu~~ (2.50%)

~~PDP NUJ secretariat primary results~~
Party	Candidate	Votes	%
PDP	~~Segun Sowunmi~~	554	92.49%
PDP	~~Jimi Lawal~~	30	5.01%
PDP	~~Ladi Adebutu~~	15	2.50%
Total votes		599	100.00%
Invalid or blank votes		3	N/A
Turnout		602	Unknown

=== Minor parties ===
- Abayomi Monsuru Omosanya (Accord)
  - Running mate: Bashirat Folashade Adenekan
- Samuel Olufemi Adeyemi (Action Alliance)
  - Running mate: Safiat Iskil-Ogunyomi
- Kazeem Shokunbi (Action Democratic Party)
  - Running mate: Oluronke Morenikeji Oseni
- Olufemi Omoshile Falana (Action Peoples Party)
  - Running mate: Basirat Oluwatosin Ijaola
- Adeyemi Harrison (African Action Congress)
  - Running mate: Olubukola Oloniyo
- Olubiyi Otegbeye (African Democratic Congress)
  - Running mate: Olatunde Awonuga
- Jolaoluwa Olutosin (Allied Peoples Movement)
  - Running mate: Sulaymon Abiola Bisiriyu
- TBD (Labour Party)
  - Running mate: TBD
- Olufemi Ajadi Oguntoyinbo (New Nigeria Peoples Party)
  - Running mate: Shakirat Oluwakemi Idris Arowolo
- Tofunmi Ogunrombi (National Rescue Movement)
  - Running mate: Femi Branch
- Cyrus Oluwaseun Johnson (People's Redemption Party)
  - Running mate: Remilekun Bolaji Quadri
- Tony Ojeshina (Social Democratic Party)
  - Running mate: Idowu Oluyemi Olugbenga

== Campaign ==
As the general election campaign began in June 2022, pundits focused on the major candidates' attempts to unify their parties in the wake of the party primaries. Both Abiodun and Adebutu started party reconciliation processes but both faced difficulties; the most major post-primary change was the sudden defection of Adekunle Akinlade and other allies of former Governor Ibikunle Amosun from the APC to the PDP with Akinlade emerging as Adebutu's running mate. Despite the PDP's poor showing in 2019, (Note: 2019 PDP nominee Buruji Kashamu only obtained about 10% of the vote.) analysts noted the political clout that the defectors held while the APC publicly recorded its indifference. However, by August, the APC set up reconciliation efforts to prevent further defections but the moves were impacted by the Amosun-Abiodun feud publicly reigniting after Amosun alleged that the 2019 election was rigged against Akinlade with Abiodun replying that Amosun had "self-delusion." For the PDP, observers noted that internal crises had negatively affected the party in every gubernatorial election since 2011 as the nominees of unrecognized factions continued to claim to be the legitimate PDP nominee.

In September, while continuing to dismiss intraparty rival Segun Sowunmi's claim to the nomination, Adebutu and the PDP become controversial for a leaked document outlining their attempt to consolidate the alliance with the Akinlade-led defectors. To secure the alliance, Adebutu and Akinlade had signed an agreement in June that had delineated the amount of appointed offices and nominations that would be filled by Akinlade group members. In the wake of the leak, the PDP defended the document as a "memorandum of understanding" to facilitate more cohesive governance and campaigning but critics attacked the paper as an attempt by Adebutu and Akinlade to corruptly divide "positions and resources among their cronies." These dynamics took a backseat to court drama a few days later, when a case from losing primary aspirants led a High Court to annul the PDP primary and order the party to conduct a new primary. The PDP did not organize a new primary, instead appealing the ruling as Adebutu continued to claim to be the rightful nominee amid further counterclaims and court battles. Also in early October, former Governor Amosun snubbed both Abiodun and the Adebutu-Akinlade ticket in revealing his endorsement of ADC nominee Olubiyi Otegbeye.

In the wake of the deepening PDP crisis and Amosun's endorsement of Otegbeye, journalists reported in November that Abiodun could be on track for a comfortable victory due to the divided opposition and support from traditional leaders. However, following weeks brought a massive shifts to the race as a Federal High Court ruling disqualified Otegbeye and all other Osun ADC nominees for the party's improper nomination processes while a Court of Appeal decision reinstated Adebutu as the legitimate PDP nominee. Although Adebutu was reinstated (and later confirmed by a Supreme Court ruling in January), internal PDP opponents vowed to continue their efforts against him as pundits noted that the infighting could still pose a major risk for the Adebutu campaign. By January, Otegbeye was also reinstated by a court appeal as legitimate nominee with pundits swiftly reviewing his renewed campaign and its prospects.

The next month, attention largely switched to the presidential election on 25 February. In the election, Ogun State voted for Bola Tinubu (APC); Tinubu won 58.9% of the vote to defeat Atiku Abubakar (PDP) at 21.4% and Peter Obi (LP) at 14.8%. Although the result was unsurprising as Ogun is in Tinubu's southwestern base and projections had favored him, the totals led to increased faith in Abiodun's chances due to Tinubu's wide margin of victory. On the other hand, gubernatorial campaign analysis reiterated the potential impact of the split in the former APC base between Abiodun and Otegbeye (who by this point was regarded as a major contender). Despite the APC split, the EiE-SBM forecast projected Abiodun to win based on the "overwhelming victory" of Tinubu. Other reports noted regional dynamics in addition to internal party crises.

== Projections ==
Source	Projection	As of
Africa Elects (Note: AfricaElects projections predict the likelihood of a candidate winning a state by categorizing a state as "Safe" for exceedingly likely, "Likely" for somewhat likely, and "Lean" for least likely. If no clear determination could be made, states are categorized as "tossups".)	Likely Abiodun	17 March 2023
Enough is Enough- SBM Intelligence (Note: EiE-SBM projections predict which candidates will win states.)	Abiodun	2 March 2023

== Conduct ==
=== Electoral timetable ===
On 26 February 2022, the Independent National Electoral Commission released the timetable, setting out key dates and deadlines for the election. Months later on 27 May 2022, INEC made a slight revision to the timetable, allowing parties extra time to conduct primaries.

- 28 February 2022 – Publication of Notice of Election
- 4 April 2022 – First day for the conduct of party primaries
- 9 June 2022 (Note: The original deadline was 3 June; however, INEC pushed it back to 9 June at the behest of parties.) – Final day for the conduct of party primaries, including the resolution of disputes arising from them
- 1 July 2022 – First day for submission of nomination forms to INEC via the online portal
- 15 July 2022 – Final day for submission of nomination forms to INEC via the online portal
- 12 October 2022 – Commencement of the official campaign period
- 16 March 2023 (Note: The original deadline was 9 March; however, INEC pushed it back to 16 March.) – Final day of the official campaign period

== General election ==
=== Results ===
2023 Ogun State gubernatorial election
Party	Candidate	Votes	%
A	Abayomi Monsuru Omosanya		
AA	Samuel Olufemi Adeyemi		
ADP	Kazeem Shokunbi		
APP	Olufemi Omoshile Falana		
AAC	Adeyemi Harrison		
ADC	Olubiyi Otegbeye	94,754	
APM	Jolaoluwa Olutosin		
APC	Dapo Abiodun	276,298	
LP	TBD		
New Nigeria Peoples Party	Olufemi Ajadi Oguntoyinbo		
NRM	Tofunmi Ogunrombi		
PDP	Ladi Adebutu	262,383	
PRP	Cyrus Oluwaseun Johnson		
SDP	Tony Ojeshina		
Total votes			100.00%
Invalid or blank votes			N/A
Turnout			

==== By senatorial district ====
The results of the election by senatorial district.

Senatorial District	Dapo Abiodun APC		Ladi Adebutu PDP		Others		Total Valid Votes
Senatorial District	Votes	Percentage	Votes	Percentage	Votes	Percentage	Total Valid Votes
Ogun Central Senatorial District (Note: Comprising the local government areas of Abeokuta North, Abeokuta South, Ewekoro, Ifo, Obafemi Owode, and Odeda.)	TBD	%	TBD	%	TBD	%	TBD
Ogun East Senatorial District (Note: Comprising the local government areas of Ijebu East, Ijebu North, Ijebu Ode, Ikenne, Odogbolu, Ogun Waterside, Remo North, and Sagamu.)	TBD	%	TBD	%	TBD	%	TBD
Ogun West Senatorial District (Note: Comprising the local government areas of Ado-Odo/Ota, Imeko Afon, Ipokia, Yewa North, and Yewa South.)	TBD	%	TBD	%	TBD	%	TBD
Totals	TBD	%	TBD	%	TBD	%	TBD

==== By federal constituency ====
The results of the election by federal constituency.

Federal Constituency	Dapo Abiodun APC		Ladi Adebutu PDP		Others		Total Valid Votes
Federal Constituency	Votes	Percentage	Votes	Percentage	Votes	Percentage	Total Valid Votes
Abeokuta North/Obafemi Owode/Odeda Federal Constituency (Note: Comprising the local government areas of Abeokuta North, Obafemi Owode, and Odeda.)	TBD	%	TBD	%	TBD	%	TBD
Abeokuta South Federal Constituency (Note: Comprising the local government area of Abeokuta South.)	TBD	%	TBD	%	TBD	%	TBD
Ado-Odo/Ota Federal Constituency (Note: Comprising the local government area of Ado-Odo/Ota.)	TBD	%	TBD	%	TBD	%	TBD
Egbado North/Imeko-Afon Federal Constituency (Note: Comprising the local government areas of Imeko Afon and Yewa North.)	TBD	%	TBD	%	TBD	%	TBD
Egbado South and Ipokia Federal Constituency (Note: Comprising the local government areas of Egbado South and Ipokia.)	TBD	%	TBD	%	TBD	%	TBD
Ifo/Ewekoro Federal Constituency (Note: Comprising the local government areas of Ifo and Ewekoro.)	TBD	%	TBD	%	TBD	%	TBD
Ijebu North/Ijebu East/Ogun Waterside Federal Constituency (Note: Comprising the local government areas of Ijebu East, Ijebu North, and Ogun Waterside.)	TBD	%	TBD	%	TBD	%	TBD
Ijebu Ode/Odogbolu/Ijebu North East Federal Constituency (Note: Comprising the local government areas of Ijebu North East, Ijebu Ode, and Odogbolu.)	TBD	%	TBD	%	TBD	%	TBD
Ikenne/Shagamu/Remo North Federal Constituency (Note: Comprising the local government areas of Ikenne, Remo North, and Shagamu.)	TBD	%	TBD	%	TBD	%	TBD
Totals	TBD	%	TBD	%	TBD	%	TBD

==== By local government area ====
The results of the election by local government area.

LGA	Dapo Abiodun APC		Ladi Adebutu PDP		Others		Total Valid Votes	Turnout Percentage
LGA	Votes	Percentage	Votes	Percentage	Votes	Percentage	Total Valid Votes	Turnout Percentage
Abeokuta North	TBD	%	TBD	%	TBD	%	TBD	%
Abeokuta South	TBD	%	TBD	%	TBD	%	TBD	%
Ado-Odo/Ota	TBD	%	TBD	%	TBD	%	TBD	%
Ewekoro	TBD	%	TBD	%	TBD	%	TBD	%
Ifo	TBD	%	TBD	%	TBD	%	TBD	%
Ijebu East	TBD	%	TBD	%	TBD	%	TBD	%
Ijebu North	TBD	%	TBD	%	TBD	%	TBD	%
Ijebu North East	TBD	%	TBD	%	TBD	%	TBD	%
Ijebu Ode	TBD	%	TBD	%	TBD	%	TBD	%
Ikenne	TBD	%	TBD	%	TBD	%	TBD	%
Imeko Afon	TBD	%	TBD	%	TBD	%	TBD	%
Ipokia	TBD	%	TBD	%	TBD	%	TBD	%
Obafemi Owode	TBD	%	TBD	%	TBD	%	TBD	%
Odogbolu	TBD	%	TBD	%	TBD	%	TBD	%
Odeda	TBD	%	TBD	%	TBD	%	TBD	%
Ogun Waterside	TBD	%	TBD	%	TBD	%	TBD	%
Remo North	TBD	%	TBD	%	TBD	%	TBD	%
Sagamu	TBD	%	TBD	%	TBD	%	TBD	%
Yewa North	TBD	%	TBD	%	TBD	%	TBD	%
Yewa South	TBD	%	TBD	%	TBD	%	TBD	%
Totals	TBD	%	TBD	%	TBD	%	TBD	%

== See also ==
- 2023 Nigerian elections
- 2023 Nigerian gubernatorial elections
