= 2023 Nigerian Senate elections in Ogun State =

- 25 February 2023

All 3 Ogun State seats in the Senate of Nigeria
	Majority party
Party	APC
Last election	3
Seats before	3
Seats won	3
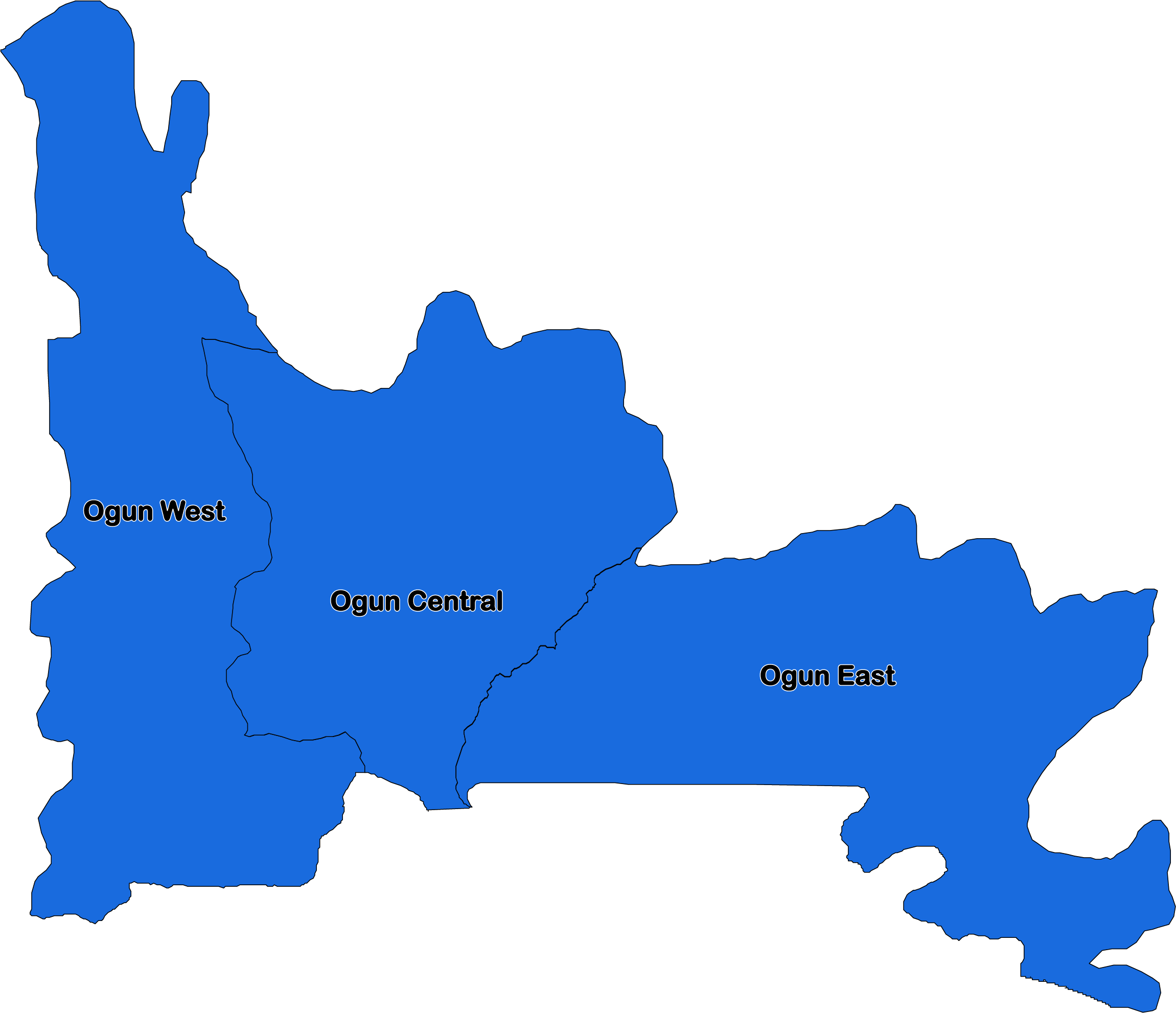
- APC incumbent retiring, lost renomination, or withdrew from primary

The 2023 Nigerian Senate elections in Ogun State was held on 25 February 2023, to elect the 3 federal Senators from Ogun State, one from each of the state's three senatorial districts. The elections coincided with the 2023 presidential election, as well as other elections to the Senate and elections to the House of Representatives; with state elections being held two weeks later. Primaries were held between 4 April and 9 June 2022.

== Background ==
In the previous Senate elections, none of the three incumbent senators were returned with all three retiring at the end of their terms. In the Central district election, Ibikunle Amosun (APC) gained the seat for the APC with 49% of the vote while Ramoni Olalekan Mustapha (APC) won the East district with 44%. In the West district, Tolu Odebiyi (APC) won the race with just 29% of the vote. The senatorial results were a continuation of APC control in the state as the party also won most House of Representatives seats, won a majority in the House of Assembly, and won the gubernatorial election along with Buhari winning the state in the presidential election.

== Overview ==
Affiliation	Party	Total
Affiliation	APC	Total
Previous Election	3	3
Before Election	3	3
After Election	3	3

== Summary ==
District	Incumbent		Results	
District	Incumbent	Party	Status	Candidates
Ogun Central	Ibikunle Amosun	APC	Incumbent retired New member elected APC hold	▌ ✓ Shuaibu Salisu (APC); ▌David Olumide Aderinokun (PDP)
Ogun East	Ramoni Olalekan Mustapha	APC	Incumbent withdrew from primary New member elected APC hold	▌ ✓ Gbenga Daniel (APC); ▌Dave Oladapo Salako (PDP)
Ogun West	Tolu Odebiyi	APC	Incumbent lost renomination New member elected APC hold	▌ ✓ Solomon Olamilekan Adeola (APC); ▌Ganiyu Adeleke Dada (PDP)

== Ogun Central ==
2023 Ogun Central Senatorial District election
- 25 February 2023
Nominee	Shuaibu Salisu	David Olumide Aderinokun
Party	APC	PDP
Senator before election
Ibikunle Amosun
APC
Elected Senator
Shuaibu Salisu
APC

The Ogun Central Senatorial District covers the local government areas of Abeokuta North, Abeokuta South, Ewekoro, Ifo, Obafemi Owode, and Odeda. Incumbent Ibikunle Amosun (APC) was elected with 48.5% of the vote in 2019. In April 2022, Amosun announced that he would run for president instead of seeking re-election; however, Amosun withdrew on the date of the APC primary in favour of eventual nominee Bola Tinubu.

=== General election ===
==== Results ====
2023 Ogun Central Senatorial District election
Party	Candidate	Votes	%
ADP	Olalekan Wasiu Hassan		
APP	Esther Olufunmilayo Keripe		
ADC	Ibukunolu Ogunjobi		
APC	Shuaibu Salisu		
APM	Olawale Afeez Olayiwola		
NRM	Sunday Akolade		
New Nigeria Peoples Party	Kehinde Adebowale David Teluwo		
PRP	Hezekiah Afolabi Ogunmeeun		
PDP	David Olumide Aderinokun		
SDP	Yinka Ola-Williams		
ZLP	Idiat Titilola Osho		
Total votes			100.00%
Invalid or blank votes			N/A
Turnout			

== Ogun East ==
2023 Ogun East Senatorial District election
- 25 February 2023
Nominee	Gbenga Daniel	Dave Oladapo Salako
Party	APC	PDP
Popular vote	115,147	58,708
Percentage	59.97%	30.58%
Senator before election
Ramoni Olalekan Mustapha
APC
Elected Senator
Gbenga Daniel
APC

The Ogun East Senatorial District covers the local government areas of Ijebu East, Ijebu North, Ijebu North East, Ijebu Ode, Ikenne, Odogbolu, Ogun Waterside, Remo North, and Sagamu. Incumbent Ramoni Olalekan Mustapha (APC), who was elected with 44.2% of the vote in 2019, initially sought re-election but withdrew from the primary.

=== General election ===
==== Results ====
2023 Ogun East Senatorial District election
Party	Candidate	Votes	%
ADP	Idris Olufunmilayo Adetutu		
APP	Oluwatosin Balikis Osiyoye		
ADC	Adeniyi Adebanjo		
APC	Gbenga Daniel		
APM	Yusuf Olanrewaju Lawal		
LP	Kazeem Adesina Banjoko		
NRM	Adewale Stanley Kuku		
New Nigeria Peoples Party	Wasiu Adebanjo		
PRP	Damilare Adebayo Otemoye		
PDP	Dave Oladapo Salako		
SDP	Sokoya Adewale		
Total votes			100.00%
Invalid or blank votes			N/A
Turnout			

== Ogun West ==
2023 Ogun West Senatorial District election
- 25 February 2023
Nominee	Solomon Olamilekan Adeola	Ganiyu Adeleke Dada
Party	APC	PDP
Popular vote	112,887	60,189
Percentage	58.70%	31.30%
Senator before election
Tolu Odebiyi
APC
Elected Senator
Solomon Olamilekan Adeola
APC

The Ogun West Senatorial District covers the local government areas of Ado-Odo/Ota, Egbado North, Egbado South, Imeko Afon, and Ipokia. Incumbent Tolu Odebiyi (APC), who was elected with 29.4% of the vote in 2019, sought re-election but lost renomination.

=== General election ===
==== Results ====
2023 Ogun West Senatorial District election
Party	Candidate	Votes	%
ADP	Isaac Eruanubare Jewemen		
APP	Olaniyi Saeed Bisiolu Akeeb		
ADC	Alani Michael Opaleye		
APC	Solomon Olamilekan Adeola		
LP	Michael Oluseyi Ashade		
NRM	Oluyinka Victor Oluranti		
New Nigeria Peoples Party	John Kayode Aina		
PRP	Gabriel Kolawole Ayeni		
PDP	Ganiyu Adeleke Dada		
Total votes			100.00%
Invalid or blank votes			N/A
Turnout			

== See also ==
- 2023 Nigerian Senate election
- 2023 Nigerian elections
- 2023 Ogun State elections
