= 2023 Nigerian presidential election in Ogun State =

- 25 February 2023
- Registered: 2,688,305
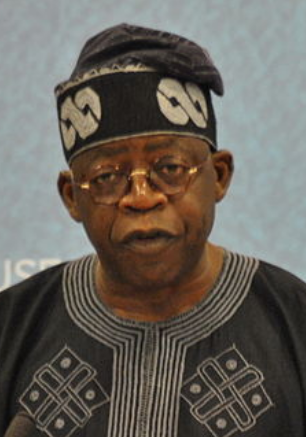

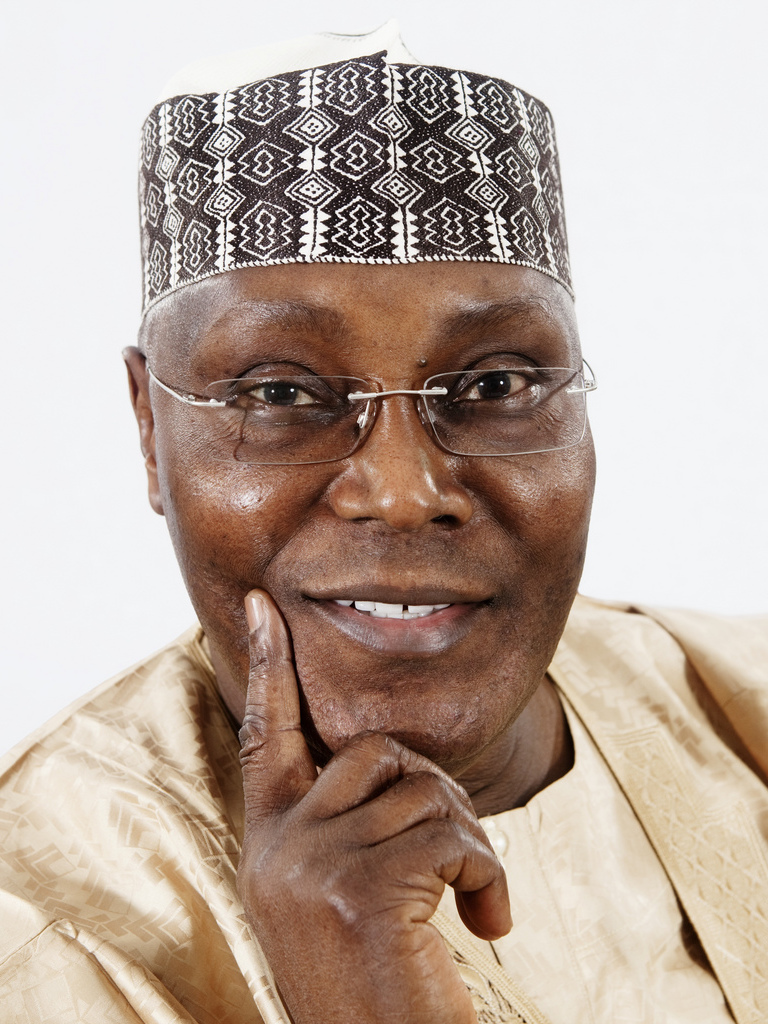

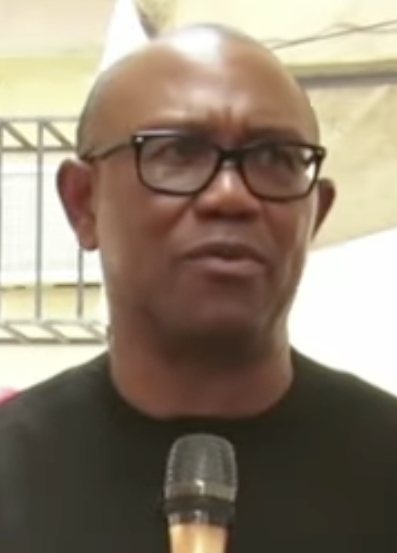
Nominee	Bola Tinubu	Atiku Abubakar
Party	APC	PDP
Home state	Lagos	Adamawa
Running mate	Kashim Shettima	Ifeanyi Okowa
Popular vote	341,554	123,831
Percentage	58.88%	21.35%
Nominee	Peter Obi	Rabiu Kwankwaso
Party	LP	New Nigeria Peoples Party
Home state	Anambra	Kano
Running mate	Yusuf Datti Baba-Ahmed	Isaac Idahosa
Popular vote	85,829	2,200
Percentage	14.79%	0.38%
President before election
Muhammadu Buhari
APC
Elected President
TBD

The 2023 Nigerian presidential election in Ogun State was held on 25 February 2023 as part of the nationwide 2023 Nigerian presidential election to elect the president and vice president of Nigeria. Other federal elections, including elections to the House of Representatives and the Senate, will also be held on the same date while state elections was held two weeks afterward on 11 March.

== Background ==
Ogun State is a small, Yoruba-majority southwestern state with vast natural areas and significant economic growth but facing a lack of affordable housing, an underdeveloped agricultural sector, and brain drain.

Politically, the 2019 elections were categorized as a reassertion of the state APC's control in the wake of a party rift that led allies of outgoing Governor Ibikunle Amosun to defect to the APM. Despite the defections, the APC held the gubernatorial office by a narrow 3% margin and the party won a majority in the House of Assembly. Federally, the APC swept all three Senate seats and won most House of Representatives seats. For the presidency, Ogun was won by APC nominee Muhammadu Buhari with about 50% but swung slightly towards the PDP.

== Polling ==
Polling organisation/client	Fieldwork date	Sample size					Others	Undecided	Undisclosed	Not voting
Polling organisation/client	Fieldwork date	Sample size	Tinubu APC	Obi LP	Kwankwaso NNPP	Abubakar PDP	Others	Undecided	Undisclosed	Not voting
BantuPage	January 2023	N/A	32%	23%	0%	9%	–	13%	12%	12%
Nextier (Ogun crosstabs of national poll)	27 January 2023	N/A	35.2%	36.3%	–	11.0%	5.5%	12.1%	–	–
SBM Intelligence for EiE (Ogun crosstabs of national poll)	22 January-6 February 2023	N/A	18%	22%	–	4%	9%	48%	–	–

== Projections ==
Source	Projection		As of
Africa Elects (Note: Africa Elects projections predict the likelihood of a candidate winning a state by categorizing a state as "Safe" for exceedingly likely, "Likely" for somewhat likely, and "Lean" for least likely. If no clear determination could be made, states are categorized as "tossups".)	Likely Tinubu		24 February 2023
Dataphyte (Note: Dataphyte projections predict candidates' projected votal shares in each state.)
Dataphyte	Tinubu:	44.95%	11 February 2023
Dataphyte	Obi:	18.14%	11 February 2023
Dataphyte	Abubakar:	21.63%	11 February 2023
Dataphyte	Others:	15.28%	11 February 2023
Enough is Enough- SBM Intelligence (Note: EiE-SBM projections predict which candidates will win states.)	Tinubu		17 February 2023
SBM Intelligence (Note: SBM projections predict which candidates will win states or, if no determination could be made, categorizes states as "Too close to call" (TCC).)	Tinubu		15 December 2022
ThisDay (Note: ThisDay projections predict candidates' projected votal shares in each state.)
ThisDay	Tinubu:	45%	27 December 2022
ThisDay	Obi:	5%	27 December 2022
ThisDay	Kwankwaso:	15%	27 December 2022
ThisDay	Abubakar:	20%	27 December 2022
ThisDay	Others/Undecided:	15%	27 December 2022
The Nation (Note: The Nation projections predict which candidates will win states or, if no determination could be made, categorizes states as "Battlegrounds.")	Tinubu		12-19 February 2023

== General election ==
=== Results ===
2023 Nigerian presidential election in Ogun State
Party	Candidate	Votes	%
A	Christopher Imumolen		
AA	Hamza al-Mustapha		
ADP	Yabagi Sani		
APP	Osita Nnadi		
AAC	Omoyele Sowore		
ADC	Dumebi Kachikwu		
APC	Bola Tinubu		
APGA	Peter Umeadi		
APM	Princess Chichi Ojei		
BP	Sunday Adenuga		
LP	Peter Obi		
NRM	Felix Johnson Osakwe		
New Nigeria Peoples Party	Rabiu Kwankwaso		
PRP	Kola Abiola		
PDP	Atiku Abubakar		
SDP	Adewole Adebayo		
YPP	Malik Ado-Ibrahim		
ZLP	Dan Nwanyanwu		
Total votes			100.00%
Invalid or blank votes			N/A
Turnout			

==== By senatorial district ====
The results of the election by senatorial district.

Senatorial District	Bola Tinubu APC		Atiku Abubakar PDP		Peter Obi LP		Rabiu Kwankwaso NNPP		Others		Total valid votes
Senatorial District	Votes	%	Votes	%	Votes	%	Votes	%	Votes	%	Total valid votes
Ogun Central Senatorial District (Note: Comprising the local government areas of Abeokuta North, Abeokuta South, Ewekoro, Ifo, Obafemi Owode, and Odeda.)	TBD	%	TBD	%	TBD	%	TBD	%	TBD	%	TBD
Ogun East Senatorial District (Note: Comprising the local government areas of Ijebu East, Ijebu North, Ijebu Ode, Ikenne, Odogbolu, Ogun Waterside, Remo North, and Sagamu.)	TBD	%	TBD	%	TBD	%	TBD	%	TBD	%	TBD
Ogun West Senatorial District (Note: Comprising the local government areas of Ado-Odo/Ota, Imeko Afon, Ipokia, Yewa North, and Yewa South.)	TBD	%	TBD	%	TBD	%	TBD	%	TBD	%	TBD
Totals	TBD	%	TBD	%	TBD	%	TBD	%	TBD	%	TBD

==== By federal constituency ====
The results of the election by federal constituency.

Federal Constituency	Bola Tinubu APC		Atiku Abubakar PDP		Peter Obi LP		Rabiu Kwankwaso NNPP		Others		Total valid votes
Federal Constituency	Votes	%	Votes	%	Votes	%	Votes	%	Votes	%	Total valid votes
Abeokuta North/Obafemi Owode/Odeda Federal Constituency (Note: Comprising the local government areas of Abeokuta North, Obafemi Owode, and Odeda.)	TBD	%	TBD	%	TBD	%	TBD	%	TBD	%	TBD
Abeokuta South Federal Constituency (Note: Comprising the local government area of Abeokuta South.)	TBD	%	TBD	%	TBD	%	TBD	%	TBD	%	TBD
Ado-Odo/Ota Federal Constituency (Note: Comprising the local government area of Ado-Odo/Ota.)	TBD	%	TBD	%	TBD	%	TBD	%	TBD	%	TBD
Egbado North/Imeko-Afon Federal Constituency (Note: Comprising the local government areas of Imeko Afon and Yewa North.)	TBD	%	TBD	%	TBD	%	TBD	%	TBD	%	TBD
Egbado South and Ipokia Federal Constituency (Note: Comprising the local government areas of Egbado South and Ipokia.)	TBD	%	TBD	%	TBD	%	TBD	%	TBD	%	TBD
Ifo/Ewekoro Federal Constituency (Note: Comprising the local government areas of Ifo and Ewekoro.)	TBD	%	TBD	%	TBD	%	TBD	%	TBD	%	TBD
Ijebu North/Ijebu East/Ogun Waterside Federal Constituency (Note: Comprising the local government areas of Ijebu East, Ijebu North, and Ogun Waterside.)	TBD	%	TBD	%	TBD	%	TBD	%	TBD	%	TBD
Ijebu Ode/Odogbolu/Ijebu North East Federal Constituency (Note: Comprising the local government areas of Ijebu North East, Ijebu Ode, and Odogbolu.)	TBD	%	TBD	%	TBD	%	TBD	%	TBD	%	TBD
Ikenne/Shagamu/Remo North Federal Constituency (Note: Comprising the local government areas of Ikenne, Remo North, and Shagamu.)	TBD	%	TBD	%	TBD	%	TBD	%	TBD	%	TBD
Totals	TBD	%	TBD	%	TBD	%	TBD	%	TBD	%	TBD

==== By local government area ====
The results of the election by local government area.

Local government area	Bola Tinubu APC		Atiku Abubakar PDP		Peter Obi LP		Rabiu Kwankwaso NNPP		Others		Total valid votes	Turnout (%)
Local government area	Votes	%	Votes	%	Votes	%	Votes	%	Votes	%	Total valid votes	Turnout (%)
Abeokuta North	TBD	%	TBD	%	TBD	%	TBD	%	TBD	%	TBD	%
Abeokuta South	TBD	%	TBD	%	TBD	%	TBD	%	TBD	%	TBD	%
Ado-Odo/Ota	TBD	%	TBD	%	TBD	%	TBD	%	TBD	%	TBD	%
Ewekoro	TBD	%	TBD	%	TBD	%	TBD	%	TBD	%	TBD	%
Ifo	TBD	%	TBD	%	TBD	%	TBD	%	TBD	%	TBD	%
Ijebu East	TBD	%	TBD	%	TBD	%	TBD	%	TBD	%	TBD	%
Ijebu North	TBD	%	TBD	%	TBD	%	TBD	%	TBD	%	TBD	%
Ijebu North East	TBD	%	TBD	%	TBD	%	TBD	%	TBD	%	TBD	%
Ijebu Ode	TBD	%	TBD	%	TBD	%	TBD	%	TBD	%	TBD	%
Ikenne	TBD	%	TBD	%	TBD	%	TBD	%	TBD	%	TBD	%
Imeko Afon	TBD	%	TBD	%	TBD	%	TBD	%	TBD	%	TBD	%
Ipokia	TBD	%	TBD	%	TBD	%	TBD	%	TBD	%	TBD	%
Obafemi Owode	TBD	%	TBD	%	TBD	%	TBD	%	TBD	%	TBD	%
Odogbolu	TBD	%	TBD	%	TBD	%	TBD	%	TBD	%	TBD	%
Odeda	TBD	%	TBD	%	TBD	%	TBD	%	TBD	%	TBD	%
Ogun Waterside	TBD	%	TBD	%	TBD	%	TBD	%	TBD	%	TBD	%
Remo North	TBD	%	TBD	%	TBD	%	TBD	%	TBD	%	TBD	%
Sagamu	TBD	%	TBD	%	TBD	%	TBD	%	TBD	%	TBD	%
Yewa North	TBD	%	TBD	%	TBD	%	TBD	%	TBD	%	TBD	%
Yewa South	TBD	%	TBD	%	TBD	%	TBD	%	TBD	%	TBD	%
Totals	TBD	%	TBD	%	TBD	%	TBD	%	TBD	%	TBD	%

== See also ==
- 2023 Ogun State elections
- 2023 Nigerian presidential election
