= Politics of Ogun State =

The politics of Ogun State function within the framework of a presidential republic, with the Governor of Ogun State as both head of state and head of government. Ogun State is known for a politically engaged citizenry. The official seat of government is in Abeokuta. Under the Constitution, the executive power is vested in the Governor. Such authority may also be exercised through the Deputy Governor or Commissioners. Legislative power is vested in a 26-member unicameral House of Assembly. Judicial power is exercised solely by the judiciary of Ogun State.

== Political institutions ==
As with the federal government of Nigeria, power in Ogun State is divided into three main branches: executive, legislative, and judicial.

=== Executive ===
The Executive branch of government in Ogun State is part of the government that is responsible for the daily administration of the state. The Executive branch consists mainly of executive council, ministries and various parastatals. It is headed by the Governor, who is both the chief of state and head of government. The governor is elected in the same manner as the President to no more than two consecutive four-year terms.

Each of the ministries is led by a Commissioner appointed by the Governor. Ogun State House of Assembly has the duty to confirm the Governor's appointments. Though parastatals have heads also appointed by the Governor, they are overseen by ministries run by Perm Secs who report to Commissioners.

Main office-holders
Office	Name	Party	Since
Governor	Dr. Prince Dapo Abiodun	All Progressive Congress	29 May 2019
Deputy Governor	Engr. Mrs Noimot Salako Oyedele	All Progressives Congress	29 May 2019

=== Legislative ===
The legislative powers in the state lie with the Ogun State House of Assembly. A unicameral body of 26 members elected every four years. The Assembly is presided over by a Speaker, assisted by other Principal Officers. All of whom are elected from among the House membership by the legislators.

Following general elections in April 2015, the current House of Assembly was formed. All Progressives Congress (APC) emerged as the largest party with 17 seats and 9 seats for the Peoples Democratic Party. Members of the House of the Assembly are elected from single-member constituencies. The 8th House of Assembly was inaugurated on 1 June 2015.

=== Judicial ===
Rivers State has an independent judiciary, which interprets and applies the law in the state. It is composed of a number of courts, each specialized for a different task. Most judicial appointments including that of Chief Judge are made by the Governor, but acting upon the recommendation of the National Judicial Council. As the third arm, the judiciary plays a stabilizing role in the affairs of polity. It is equipped to adjudicate disputes between people or the government at various levels. Presently, there are 10 judicial divisions within the High Court of Justice, and about 20 judges carrying out their professional work.

== Political parties and elections ==
The main political players are the People's Democratic Party and the All Progressives Congress. These parties along with several minor ones put forward candidates for elections to the executive, legislative and local government councils. Alliance for Democracy first governed the state in 1999, by 2003 Peoples Democratic Party took over and by 2011 All progressives Congress took over.

== Local government ==
At local level, the state is divided into local government areas. There are 23 LGAs that handle local administration under an elected Chairman or Mayor. Each of the local government areas has its own administrative seat and is further split into wards. Council elections are organized through the Ogun State Independent Electoral Commission.

Rank	LGA	Population (1991)	Rank	Population (2006)
2	Ifo	215,055	1	539,170
1	Ado-Odo/Ota	234,647	2	527,242
4	Ijebu North	148,342	3	280,520
3	Shagamu	155,726	4	255,885
N/A	Abeokuta South	N/A	5	250,295
5	Obafemi-Owode	135,774	6	235,071
6	Abeokuta North	93,966	7	198,793
N/A	Egbado North	N/A	8	183,844
N/A	Egbado South	N/A	9	168,336
N/A	Ijebu Ode	N/A	10	157,161
N/A	Ipokia	N/A	11	150,387
7	Odogbolu	88,384	12	125,657
N/A	Ikenne	N/A	13	119,117
8	Odeda	86,950	14	109,522
10	Ijebu East	61,120	15	109,321
N/A	Imeko Afon	N/A	16	82,952
9	Ogun Waterside	61,919	17	74,222
N/A	Ijebu North East	N/A	18	68,800
N/A	Remo North	N/A	20	59,752
N/A	Ewekoro	N/A	19	55,093
	Ogun State	2,333,726	16	3,751,140

== See also ==
- Governor of Ogun State
- Ogun State House of Assembly
- Nigerian National Assembly delegation from Ogun
