= 2015 Ogun State gubernatorial election =

2015 gubernatorial election in Ogun State, Nigeria

- (Nigeria)
- 11 April 2015
Nominee	Ibikunle Amosun	Adegboyega Isiaka
Party	APC	PDP
Running mate	Yetunde Onanuga	Bilau Adekunle
Popular vote	306,988	201,440
Percentage	60.38%	39.62%
Governor before election
Ibikunle Amosun
ACN
Elected Governor
Ibikunle Amosun
APC

The 2015 Ogun State gubernatorial election occurred on 11 April 2015. Incumbent Governor APC's Ibikunle Amosun won election for a second term, defeating PDP's Adegboyega Isiaka and several minor party candidates. Amosun received 60.38% of the vote.

Ibikunle Amosun emerged unopposed in the APC gubernatorial primary after all the aspirants stepped down. He picked Yetunde Onanuga as his running mate.

Adegboyega Isiaka was the PDP candidate with Bilau Adekunle as his running mate.

== Electoral system ==
The Governor of Ogun State is elected using the plurality voting system.

== Primary election ==
=== APC primary ===
The APC primary election was held on --, 2014. The incumbent governor, Sen. Ibikunle Amosun, who was the sole contestant polled 3,554 votes to emerge winner. There were 3, 681 delegates in the exercise, with 16 invalid votes.

=== Candidates ===
- Party nominee: Ibikunle Amosun.
- Running mate: Yetunde Onanuga.

=== PDP primary ===
The PDP primary election was held on Monday, December 8, 2014. Even after the National Working Committee (NWC) of the party claimed the election was unauthorized, it was still carried out to produce Adegboyega Isiaka who polled 705 votes as the party's state governorship flag bearer, defeating closest contender, Jelili Kayode Amusan, with 150 votes. Omoba Segun Adewale, however, got no vote. There were over 900 delegates from all over the state. Other aspirants for the race include: former Speaker of the House of Representatives, Rt. Hon. Dimeji Bankole; former Minister for Mines and Power, Alh. Sarafadeen Ishola; former chairman Abeokuta South LGA, Prince Yanju Lipede, and others. Nine aggrieved aspirants, including: Asiwaju Tony Ojesina, Prince Yanju Lipede, Dr. Remilekun Bakare, Alh. Sarafa Tunji Ishola, Dr. Yomi Majekodunmi, Prof. David Bamgbose, Isiaq Akinlade, Alh. Rafiu Ogunleye and Hon. Dimeji Bankole, boycotted the election.

=== Candidates ===
- Party nominee: Adegboyega Isiaka
- Running mate: Bilau Adekunle.
- Jelili Kayode Amusan
- Omoba Segun Adewale
- Asiwaju Tony Ojesina: Boycotted.
- Remilekun Bakare: Boycotted.
- Yomi Majekodunmi: Boycotted.
- David Bamgbose: Boycotted.
- Isiaq Akinlade: Boycotted.
- Rafiu Ogunleye: Boycotted.
- Dimeji Bankole: Former Speaker, Federal House of Representatives: Boycotted.
- Sarafadeen Tunji Ishola: former chairman Abeokuta South LGA: Boycotted.
- Prince Yanju Lipede: Boycotted.

== Results ==
A total of five candidates registered with the Independent National Electoral Commission to contest in the election. APC Governor Ibikunle Amosun won re-election for a second term, defeating APC's Adegboyega Nasiru Isiaka and other minor party candidates. Amosun received 60.38% of the votes, while Isiaka received 39.62%.

The total number of registered voters in the state was 1,125,657.

Candidate	Party	Votes	%
Ibikunle Amosun	All Progressives Congress (APC)	306,988	57.46
Adegboyega Isiaka	People's Democratic Party	201,440	37.70
Kamar Babalola Akin-Odunsi	Social Democratic Party (SDP)	25,826	4.83
Others			
Total		534,254	100.00
Source: Premium Times, News Express

=== By local government area ===
Here are the results of the election by local government area for the two major parties. Blue represents LGAs won by Amosun. Green represents LGAs won by Isiaka.

County	Ibikunle Amosun PDP		Adegboyega Isiaka APC		Total votes
County	#	%	#	%	#
Abeokuta North	22,740		371		
Abeokuta South	35,511		10,288		
Ado-Odo/Ota	36,108		13,763		
Egbado North	15,594		16,001		
Egbado South	10,844		12,915		
Ewekoro	10,735		3,275		
Ifo	28,596		5,818		
Ijebu East	8,980		9,408		
Ijebu North	14,317		18,787		
Ijebu North East	5,992		6,780		
Ijebu Ode	10,570		11,381		
Ikenne	11,085		8,686		
Imeko Afon	8,253		12,412		
Ipokia	16,240		16,877		
Obafemi Owode	16,333		6,637		
Odeda	10,637		3,633		
Odogbolu	10,129		10,430		
Ogun Waterside	8,468		7,400		
Remo North	7,365		6,567		
Sagamu	18,491		14,011		
Totals					
