= List of Ogun State local government areas by area =

Rank	LGA	Area km^{2}		
6	Abeokuta North	93,966		
N/A	Abeokuta South	N/A		
1	Ado-Odo/Ota	234,647		
	Yewa North			
	Yewa South			
N/A	Ewekoro	N/A	19	55,093
2	Ifo	215,055	1	539,170
10	Ijebu East	61,120	15	109,321
4	Ijebu North	148,342	3	280,520
N/A	Ijebu North East	N/A	18	68,800
N/A	Ijebu Ode	N/A	10	157,161
N/A	Ikenne	N/A	13	119,117
N/A	Imeko Afon	N/A	16	82,952
N/A	Ipokia	N/A	11	150,387
5	Obafemi-Owode	135,774	6	235,071
8	Odeda	86,950	14	109,522
7	Odogbolu	88,384	12	125,657
9	Ogun Waterside	61,919	17	74,222
N/A	Remo North	N/A	20	59,752
3	Shagamu	155,726	4	255,885
	Ogun State	2,333,726	16	16,980.55

align=*center | 165000000
