= Nigerian National Assembly delegation from Ogun State =

Ogun's delegation in Nigeria's National Assembly

The Nigerian National Assembly delegation from Ogun State comprises three Senators, representing Ogun East, Ogun Central, and Ogun West, and nine Representatives, representing Ijebu-Ode/Odogbolu/Ijebu North East, Ijebu-North/Waterside/Ijebu East,Remo,Abeokuta South, Abeokuta North, Egbado South and Ipokia, Ogun East, Imeko Afon/Yewa North, Ado-Odo/Ota, Ifo/Em

== Fourth Republic ==
=== 9th Assembly (2019–2023) ===
| Senator | Party | Constituency |
|---|---|---|
| Ibikunle Amosun | APC | Ogun Central |
| Lekan Mustapha | APC | Ogun East |
| Tolu Odebiyi | APC | Ogun West |
| Representative | Party | Constituency |
| Otunba Adewunmi | APC | Ikenne/Shagamu/Remo North |
| Adekoya Adesegun | PDP | Ijebu North/Ijebu East/Ogun Waterside |
| Kolapo Osunsanya | APC | Ijebu Ode/Odogbolu/Ijebu North East |
| Ibrahim Isiaka | APC | Ifo/Ewekoro |
| Jimoh Olaifa | ADC | Imeko Afon/Egbado North |
| Olumide Osoba | APC | Abeokuta North/Obafemi- Owode/Odeda |
| Wasiu Lawal | APM | Egbado South and Ipokia |
| Olanrewaju Edun | APC | Abeokuta South |
| Jimoh Ojugbele | APC | Ado-Odo/Ota |

=== 8th Assembly (2015–2019) ===
| Senator | Party | Constituency |
|---|---|---|
| Lanre Tejuosho | APC | ogun Central |
| Buruji Kashamu | PDP | Ogun East |
| Joseph Dada | APC | Ogun West |
| Representative | Party | Constituency |
| Oladipupo Olatunde Adebutu | PDP | Ikenne/Shagamu/Remo North |
| Adekoya Adesegun | PDP | Ijebu North/Ijebu East/Ogun Waterside |
| Odeneye Olusegun | APC | Ijebu Ode/Odogbolu/Ijebu North East |
| Ibrahim Isiaka | APC | Ifo/Ewekoro |
| Kayode Oladele | APC | Imeko Afon/Egbado North |
| Mukaila Kassim | APC | Abeokuta North/Obafemi- Owode/Odeda |
| Adekunle Akinlade | APC | Egbado South and Ipokia |
| Samuel Williams | APC | Abeokuta South |
| Jimoh Ojugbele | APC | Ado-Odo/Ota |

=== 7th Assembly (2011–2015) ===
| Senator | Party | Constituency |
|---|---|---|
| Olugbenga Onaolapo Obadara | ACN | Ogun Central |
| Sefiu Adegbenga Kaka | ACN | Ogun East |
| Akin Babalola Kamar Odunsi | ACN | Ogun West |
| Representative | Party | Constituency |
| Buraimo Taofeek | ACN | Ikenne/Shagamu/Remo North |
| Abudu Abiodun | SDP | Ijebu North/Ijebu East/Ogun Waterside |
| Kehinde Odeneye | APC | Ijebu Ode/Odogbolu/Ijebu North East |
| Adeyemi Adekunle | SDP | Ifo/Ewekoro |
| Razaq Tunde Adewusi | PPN | Egbado North/Imeko Afon |
| Osoba Babatunde | APC | Abeokuta North/Obafemi- Owode/Odeda |
| Isiaq Akinlade | PDP | Egbado South and Ipokia |
| Samuel Williams | APC | Abeokuta South |
| Ogunola Tunde | APC | Ado-Odo/Ota |

=== 6th Assembly (2007–2011) ===
| Senator | Party | Constituency |
|---|---|---|
| Iyabo Obasanjo-Bello | PDP | Ogun Central |
| Ramoni Mustapha | PDP | Ogun East |
| Felix Bajomo | PDP | Ogun West |
| Representative | Party | Constituency |
| Mustapha Olalekan | PDP | Ikenne/Shagamu/Remo North |
| Olusola Ojugbele | PDP | Ijebu North/Ijebu East/Ogun Waterside |
| Salako Oladapo | PDP | Ijebu Ode/Odogbolu/Ijebu North East |
| Anthony Ogunbanjo | PDP | Ifo/Ewekoro |
| Sowande Abayomi | PDP | Imeko Afon/Egbado North |
| Amusan Kayode | PDP | Abeokuta North/Obafemi- Owode/Odeda |
| Isiaq Akinlade | PDP | Egbado South and Ipokia |
| Dimeji Bankole | PDP | Abeokuta South |
| Razak Tunde Adewusi | PDP | Egbado North Imeko Afon |

=== The 5th Parliament (2003–2007) ===
| OFFICE | NAME | PARTY | CONSTITUENCY | TERM |
| Senator | Ibikunle Amosun | Peoples Democratic Party | Ogun Central | 2003–2007 |
| Senator | Iyabo Anisulowo | People Democratic Party | Ogun East | 2003–2007 |
| Senator | Tokunbo Ogunbanjo | People Democratic Party | Ogun West | 2003–2007 |
| Representative | ---- | ---- | Ijebu Ode/Odogbolu/Ijebu North East | 2003–2007 |
| Representative | ---- | ---- | Remo | 2003–2007 |
| Representative | ---- | ---- | Abeokuta North | 2003–2007 |
| Representative | ---- | ---- | Abeokuta South | 2003–2007 |
| Representative | ---- | ---- | Ogun East | 2003–2007 |
| Representative | ---- | ---- | Egbado South and Ipokia | 2003–2007 |
| Representative | Razak Tunde Adewusi | PDP | Egbado North/Imeko Afon | 2003–2007 |
| Representative | ---- | ---- | Ifo/Ewekoro | 2003–2007 |
| Representative | ---- | ---- | Ado-Odo/Ota | 2003–2007 |

=== The 4th Parliament (1999 -2003) ===
| OFFICE | NAME | PARTY | CONSTITUENCY | TERM |
| Senator | Olabiyi Durojaiye | AD | Ogun East | 1999–2003 |
| Senator | Femi Okurounmu | AD | Ogun Central | 1999–2003 |
| Senator | Afolabi Olabimtan | AD | Ogun West | 1999–2003 |
| Representative | Adedeji Amusa Suraj | AD | Ijebu Ode/Odogbolu/Ijebu North East | 1999–2003 |
| Representative | Babatunde Olokun | AD | Remo | 1999–2003 |
| Representative | Laosihe Abraham Lanare | AD | Abeokuta South | 1999–2003 |
| Representative | Mustapha Olabode | AD | Abeokuta North | 1999–2003 |
| Representative | Odutan Kamaorun Alabi | AD | Egbado South and Ipokia | 1999–2003 |
| Representative | Onadeko Onamusi | AD | Ogun East | 1999–2003 |
| Representative | Owolabi Ashamu Ola | AD | Imeko Afon/Yewa North | 1999–2003 |
| Representative | Rasheed Babawale Remi | AD | Ado-Odo/Ota | 1999–2003 |
| Representative | yaya Abayomi Collins | AD | Ifo/Ewekoro | 1999–2003 |
