= Ago-Iwoye =

City in Ogun State, Nigeria

- Town
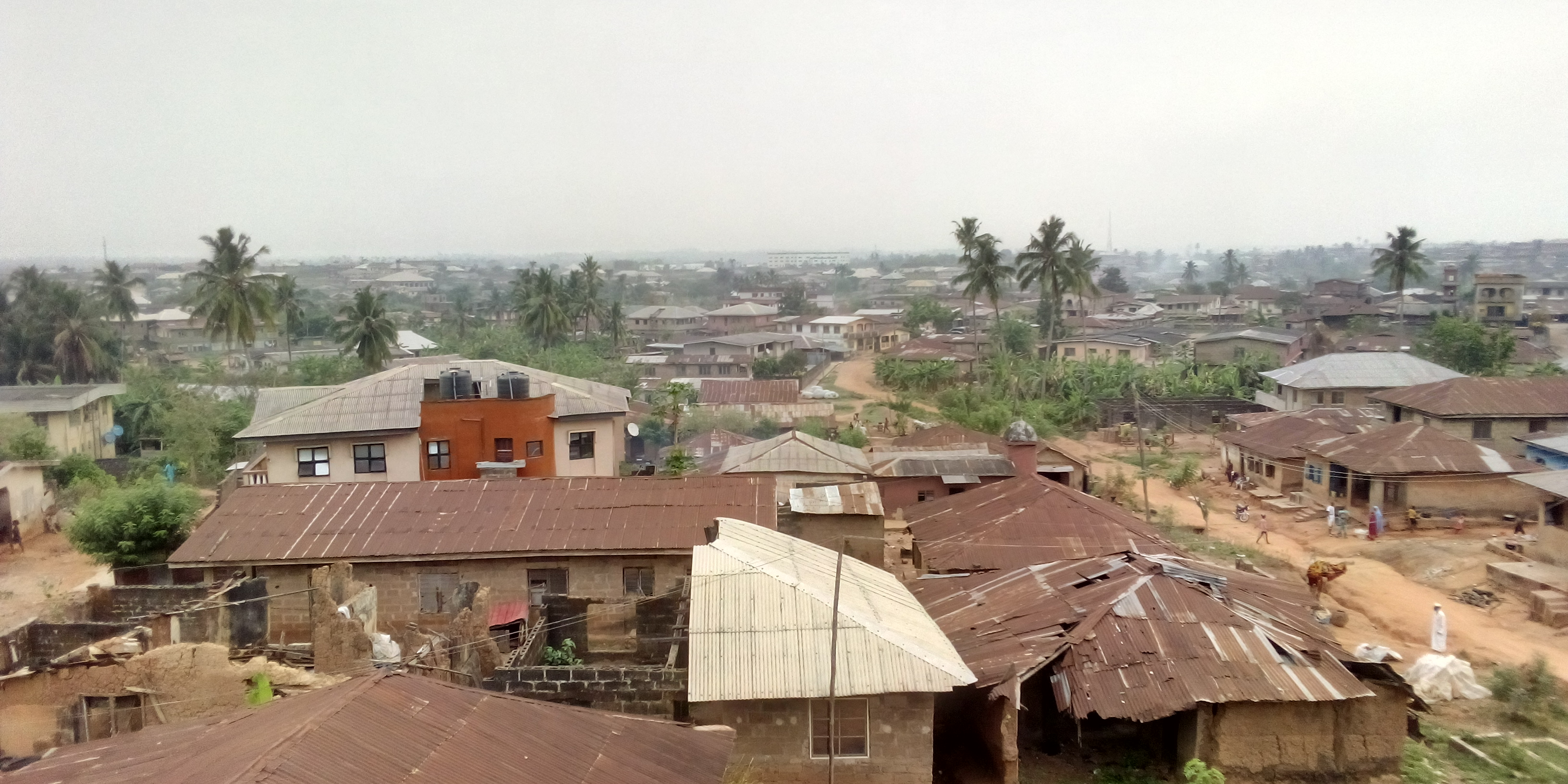

- Ago-Iwoye's location in Nigeria
- Country: Nigeria
- Zone: South West
- State: Ogun State
- Local government area: Ijebu North

Government
  - Ebumawe: Oba Abdul Rasaq Adesina Adenugba
- Elevation: 65 m (213 ft)
- Time zone: UTC+1 (WAT)
- Postal code: 1020107

Ago-Iwoye is a town in Ogun State, Nigeria of the Ijebu Kingdom. It is located in the Ijebu North Local Governmental Area and the main town comprises seven contiguous districts: Ibipe (considered the leading settlement), Isamuro, Idode, Odosinusi, Igan, Imosu, and Imere. The main campus of Olabisi Onabanjo University is located 7 km west of the city. In 1963, the town had a population of 14,718; by 2013, it was estimated to be about 190,000, with 40,000 of those being university students.

== History ==
=== Establishment ===
Iwoye was a settlement established in 1425 with 73 Imososi families and is considered "one of the ancient towns in Yorubaland." Iwoye, also called Wojaiye, coexisted peacefully with surrounding areas for several centuries until the 1800s ushered in a 70-year period of fratricidal wars. The Egba were interested expanding into Abeokuta, inspiring violence between the two groups and "le[ading] to the desertion of many places." The original land on which Iwoye stood was not exempt. The brutal Gbedeke War of 1831 saw Iwoye moving southeast to seek out "a new War Camp" (Ago). The new settlement was called Ago Meleki, "Meleki's Camp," for the man who led the Iwoye retreat. The organisation Ago Iwoye Progressives Union is said to have inspired the village to merge Ago and Iwoye, thus commemorating their previous home and celebrating their new one. It was officially changed in 1946.

=== Introduction of Islam ===
Islam trickled into town via soldiers, settlers, immigrants, traders, and enslaved Muslims. They had a sizeable presence by the end of the 19th century and occupied villages alongside Hausa, Fulani, Tapa, and Yoruba communities. Ago-Iwoye's leaders, the Osugbo, as well as other traditionalists were not welcoming and threatened them with death. Scholar Alfa 'Uthman Akeugberu knelt one day to pray in front of a non-Muslim friend, which was forbidden. The town Elders decided to sacrifice him and tied him to a tree; his friend later rescued him. Following this attempted assassination, the Muslim community in Ago-Iwoye fell apart and emigrated to the nearby villages of Difase and Eredo. By the 1890s, the religion had reemerged and were welcomed back by the town. One of the male members of the Osugbo fraternity witnessed what he believed was a family member recovering from illness at the verge of death; he subsequently converted to Islam, taking several of his group with him. Akeugberu eventually established the town's first Arabic and Qur'anic school.

=== Colonisation and Christianity ===
British colonisation began in the mid-19th century but became official in 1914, and Ijebu-Igbo, Imusin, and Ago-Iwoye were, "for administrative convenience, turned into political units," each under a designated baale. In Ago-Iwoye, the title rotated between the villages.

Christian missionaries first started to introduce western education and Christianity to the town in 1892 but were unsuccessful. They returned later that year to take advantage of the upset caused by the Magbo War of 1892, also known as the British-Ijebu War. With Britain occupying Ijebuland, the missionaries were accompanied by British soldiers as they spread the word of Christ. The Church Mission Society and the Wesleyan Methodist Church were at this time the largest presence in town. The Wesley School, the first Christian institution in Ago-Iwoye, began converting students from Arabic schools to give them a "new education." Conversion techniques included forcibly baptising Muslim children, indoctrinating them at schools where they were away from their parents, and giving them Christian names. As western education spread, the idea of literacy came under fire; Islamic scholars were now considered illiterate under "a new system of literacy." Further, Christianity was seen as a prerequisite for getting any sort of gainful employment throughout the 68 years of colonial rule.

In the early 20th century, Ijebu-Igbo, Imusin, and Ago-Iwoye came together to "[advance] territorial group interest under colonial dispensation" and formed advocate groups, respectively the Iejebu-Igbo Patriotic Society (1922), the Ago Progressive Union (1926), and the Ijebu-Imusin Progress Society (1932). Due to Britain's indirect rule, area customs were respected, but did not stop them from bringing capitalism into Ogun and surrounding areas by establishing a market economy and monetising political offices that had historically been hereditary.

Tides turned for Muslims in the 1930s, when Muslim schools expanded, and non-Christians were given legal protection in the face of forced conversion under an education ordinate: "No child in a government school could receive religious instruction to which the parents or guardian has objected or could be forced to present when such instruction was given at such school." Whereas Christian missionaries weaponised Qur'an passages, Muslim scholars started finding commonality between the two holy books. Regardless, English and Yoruba became the languages of instruction rather than Arabic.

Decolonisation began with earnest in 1957 and Nigeria gained independence from British colonial rule on 1 October 1960.

== Ebumawe/Leadership ==
By the end of the 1920s, not long into colonial rule, Ago-Iwoye locals began discussing the revival of their traditional hereditary titles, including the Ebumawe. This came to fruition in 1931 when the office was reinstated, and the first Ebumawe since the title's brief extinction, Oba Akadi Alonge Adenugba, was crowned. The current Ebumawe is Oba Abdul Rasaq Adesina Adunugbe, the grandson of the Akadi Alonge, who ruled 1932–1944. Adunugbe took the throne on 8 May 2004 and shortly thereafter was named a "first-class Oba" by the Ogun state government.

Oba Adunugbe attempts to honor both traditionalism and modernization, particularly with the university nearby; traditionally, men were not allowed to plait their hair and women were not allowed to wear trousers, and the Oba is aware he can only control so much. He also makes himself, a Muslim, available to non-Muslims and welcomes people of all religions to celebrate their traditions at his palace. In his first 15 years as Ebumawe, he established a prison farm, Federal Safety Corps Divisional offices, a five-day marketplace, and a Rotary Club to "boost social activities in the town." In 2017, he received an "Ambassador of Peace" award for his commitment to the town and its people, particularly the university community, from the National Association of Nigeria Students. Annual festivals, such as the Agemo, Egungun, Ogun, and Olokun festivals, are celebrated; the Oba makes sure the traditional elements, such as not eating yams before the Iri ji festival, are kept alive.

Oba Adunugbe has also revived the traditional practice of age groups, called regberegbes, which ties together people born within a three-year period. Historically, the regberegbes have strengthened community ties. Adunugbe holds "Oba-in-council" forums, where people of any class, age, religion, age group, etc., can bring forward concerns or ideas.

== Infrastructure ==
Ago-Iwoye is steadily growing and urbanising; there is a central business district that has highlighted the lack of city planning that went into building up the city. As of 2013, there were no known existing traffic plans and "required pedestrian facilities were virtually absent." Oba Adunugbe has expressed interest in building factories in the area to usher in more commercialism, but said that the government would have to make those financial decisions.

Ago-Iwoye has been tapped as one of 15 major communities that will benefit from the state's Urban Water Resuscitation projects. Dapo Abiodun, the Ogun state governor, shared plans in 2022 to "introduce a community-based water supply scheme called 'water kiosking'. Abiodun also promised that roads that were torn up for construction more than a decade ago "would receive priority attention." The Ikenne-Ilishan-Ago-Iwoye Road was among the roads listed.

== Agriculture ==
Ago-Iwoye's economy is primarily agricultural; in 1963, twenty years before the university was established, it was estimated that 80-90% of the population worked on farms. Among the goods produced are yams, cassava, cocoyams, maize, melons, egusi, kolanuts, cocoa, palm oil, garri, bananas, and rice.

== University ==
Olabisi Onabanjo University (OOU) was opened in January 1983 as the state-owned Ogun State University. The main campus is in Ago-Iwoye, while other campuses are in the nearby towns of Ayetoro, Ibogun, and Shagamu.

OOU Ago-Iwoye has 6 faculties and a number of departments:

- Faculty of Arts: English, Performing Arts, History and Diplomatic Studies, Linguistics and Nigerian Languages, Foreign Languages, Philosophy, Religious Studies
- Faculty of Science: Plant Science, Zoology and Environmental Biology, Chemical Sciences, Earth Sciences, Mathematical Sciences, Physics, Microbiology
- Faculty of Social Science: Geography and Regional Planning, Political Science, Sociology, Psychology, Economics, Mass Communication
- Faculty of Administration and Management Sciences: Accounting, Banking and Finance, Transport Management, Public Administration, Cooperative and Rural Development, Business Administration, Industrial Relations and Personnel Management
- Faculty of Education: Educational Management and Business Studies, Educational Foundations and Counselling, Curriculum Studies and Instructional Technology, Human Kinetics and Health Education, Arts and Social Science Education
- Faculty of Law: Private Law, Business and Industrial Law, Public Law, Jurisprudence and International Law

The university, according to Oba Adunugbe, is the backbone of the community's commercialism. "Before, on ordinary days," he said, "when you went to a house, you only saw goats and fowls at the doors steps because people would have all gone to farm." At times, there were more OOU students than locals living in Ago-Iwoye. The university students are keen protestors, which has made the police wary of them. Oba Adunugbe "formed a committee" with the university to better relations between the OOU and the town and to handle mutual issues. During a 2014 protest over increased fees, the university shut down until the anger receded, which was another controversial decision.

=== Crime ===
Like many parts of Africa, Ago-Iwoye has an active Black Axe presence. The Aiye cult group, as they are also known, started as a Nigerian crime syndicate that eventually made its way into the highest societal positions and is now international. Black Axe began as a student cofraternity at the University of Benin and primarily recruits males ages 16–23, specifically targeting university students.

On 16 June 2005, a boy walking home from Wesley High School at night with a friend was shot dead by "the Vigilante Group." The next morning, angry OOU students stormed the king's palace and burned it down. The fighting—at this point between townspeople and students—was only stopped when police from Abeokuta arrived. The university closed for a while afterwards. Security in Ago-Iwoye has increased since then, with more volunteers working with police to keep the peace. Oba Adenugba believe that "hired hoodlums" were pretending to be protesting OOU students. In 2013, due to the university being the main target for crime and violence, Ogun State brought in APCs to "monitor and curtail the nefarious activities of the hoodlums who used to terrorise the university community.
