= Ijebu =

Ijebu may refer to:

== People ==
- Ijebu Kingdom, Yoruba kingdom in pre-colonial Nigeria
- Ijebu people, an subethnic group of the Yoruba from Nigeria

== Places ==
- Ijebu, Owo, a local government area of Ondo State, south-western Nigeria
- Ijebu Diocese of the Church of Nigeria
- Ijebu-Ode Diocese of the Catholic Church
- Ijebu East, a local government area in Ogun State, Nigeria
- Ijebu Igbo, a town in Ogun State, Nigeria
- Ijebu Ode, a town in Ogun State, Nigeria
- Ijebu North, a local government area in Ogun State, Nigeria
- Ijebu North East, a local government area in Ogun State, Nigeria
