= Ibrahim Isiaka =

Nigerian politician

Ibrahim Ayokunle Isiaka

Member of the House of Representatives
- Constituency: Ifo/Ewekoro Federal Constituency

Personal details
- Born: 6 July 1966 (age 59) Ogun State, Nigeria
- Party: All Progressives Congress
- Occupation: Politician

Ibrahim Ayokunle Isiaka (born 6 July 1966) is a Nigerian politician representing the Ifo/Ewekoro Federal Constituency in Ogun State. He is a member of the All Progressives Congress and serves in the 10th National House of Representatives.
