= Tella Babatunde =

Nigerian journalist and politician

Hon. Tella Opeolu Babatunde

Deputy Chief Whip of the Ogun State House of Assembly
- Incumbent
- Assumed office June 2023
- Governor: Dapo Abiodun
- Constituency: Abeokuta North

Personal details
- Born: 23 October 1964 (age 61) Ibadan, Oyo State, Nigeria
- Party: All Progressives Congress
- Education: Lead City University
- Occupation: Journalist, administrator, academic, lawmaker, politician

Tella Opeolu Babatunde (born 23 October 1964) is a Nigerian journalist, administrator, academic, lawmaker, and politician. He serves as Deputy Chief Whip of the Ogun State House of Assembly, representing Abeokuta North Constituency.

== Early life ==
Babatunde was born on 23 October 1964 at University College Hospital, Ibadan, Oyo State. He is a native of Isaga-Orile in the Abeokuta North Local Government Area of Ogun State.

== Career ==
He was a part-time lecturer in the Department of Mass Communication at the Federal Polytechnic, Ilaro from October 2018. He also lectured part-time at the School of Communication and General Studies, Moshood Abiola Polytechnic, Abeokuta, between April 2011 and 2017, and at the Centre for Continuing Education, Department of Mass Communication, Olabisi Onabanjo University, Ago-Iwoye, from October 2011 to February 2015.

=== Political career ===
Babatunde was elected to the Ogun State House of Assembly representing Abeokuta North Constituency. He serves as Deputy Chief Whip of the Assembly.
