= Kolapo Osunsanya =

Nigerian politician

Kolapo Korede Osunsanya

Member of the House of Representatives
- Incumbent
- Assumed office 2019
- Constituency: Ijebu Ode/Odogbolu/Ijebu North East Federal Constituency

Personal details
- Born: 1963 (age 62–63) Ogun State, Nigeria
- Party: All Progressives Congress (APC)
- Occupation: Politician

Kolapo Korede Osunsanya is a Nigerian politician who served as a member representing the Ijebu Ode/Odogbolu/Ijebu North East Federal Constituency in the House of Representatives. Born in 1963, he hails from Ogun State. He was elected into the House of Assembly at the 2019 elections under the All Progressives Congress (APC). The Election Petitions Tribunal in Abeokuta nullified the electoral results due to irregularities and ordered a re-run election in affected wards.
