= Jelili Kayode Amusan =

Nigerian politician

Jelili Kayode Amusan is a Nigerian politician. He was a member of the Federal House of Representatives representing Abeokuta North/Obafemi Owode/Odeda Federal constituency in Ogun state.
