= D.S. Adegbenro ICT Polytechnic =

Educational institution in Nigeria

- Type: Public
- Established: 2006
- Rector: Dr.Rauf Adegoke Akeem
- Location: Ewekoro, Ogun State, Nigeria
- Website: Official website

The D.S. Adegbenro ICT Polytechnic is a state government higher education institution located in Ewekoro, Ogun State, Nigeria..

== History ==
The D.S. Adegbenro ICT Polytechnic was established in 2006. It was formerly known as Gateway ICT Polytechnic.

== Courses ==
The institution offers the following courses;

- Statistics
- Electrical/Electronic Engineering Technology
- Computer Science
- Business Administration and Management
- Office Technology And Management
- Agricultural Technology
- Science Laboratory Technology
- Computer Engineering
- Marketing
- Public Administration
- Accountancy
- Mass Communication
- Library Science
