= Olusegun Kehinde Odeneye =

Nigerian politician

Member of the House of Representatives of Nigeria
- In office 2011–2015
- Constituency: Ijebu Ode/Odogbolu/Ijebu North-East

Personal details
- Born: 1970 (age 55–56) Ogun State, Nigeria
- Party: Action Congress of Nigeria; All Progressives Congress
- Occupation: Politician, chartered accountant

Olusegun Kehinde Odeneye is a Nigerian politician. He was a member of the Federal House of Representative, representing Ijebu Ode/Odogbolu/Ijebu North-East Federal Constituency of Ogun State in the 7th National Assembly.
