= Abudu Abiodun =

Nigerian politician

Member of the Ogun State House of Assembly
- In office 2007–2015
- Constituency: Ijebu North/Ijebu East/Ogun Waterside

Commissioner for Environment
- Incumbent
- Assumed office 2021

Personal details
- Born: Ogun State, Nigeria
- Occupation: Politician

Abudu Abiodun is a Nigerian politician from Ogun State, Nigeria. He served in the Ogun State House of Assembly, representing the Ijebu North/Ijebu East/Ogun Waterside constituency from 2007 to 2015. He also served as the Commissioner for Environment in 2021.
