= Adebori =

Coordinates: 7°20′43″N 3°24′23″E

Adebori is a village in Obete District of Odeda Local Government Area, Ogun State, Nigeria. The village zip code is 110125.
