= Abeokuta North constituency =

Coordinates: 7°12′41″N 3°08′16″E

Abeokuta North (also known as Obafemi-Owode or Odeda federal constituency) is a National Assembly delegation in Ogun State, Nigeria. It is Currently represented by Olumide Osoba After The 2019 general elections.

Chief M.K.O Abiola was a prominent Nigerians from Abeokuta North. Abiola was the acclaimed winner of the 1993 Presidential election which was later annulled by president Ibrahim Babangida.

It covers the LGAs of Abeokuta North, Obafemi Owode, and Odeda.
