= Jimoh Ojugbele =

Nigerian politician

Jimoh Ojugbele is a Nigerian politician. He was a member of the Federal House of Representatives, representing Ado-Odo/Ota Federal Constituency of Ogun state in the 9th National assembly.
