= Ijebu Igbo =

Town in Nigeria

Ijebu Igbo Oloja Igbo
- Town
- Location within Nigeria
- Coordinates: 6°58′N 4°00′E
- Country: Nigeria
- State: Ogun
- LGA: Ijebu North

Government
  - Type: Democratic
- Time zone: UTC+01
  - Summer (DST): UTC+01 (WAT)
- Postal code: 110001
- Climate: Aw

Ijebu Igbo (Yoruba: Ìjẹ̀bú-Igbó) is a town in Ogun State, Nigeria. It is the headquarters of Ijebu North Local Government Area of Ogun State, Nigeria. It is approximately a 15-minute drive north of Ijebu Ode.

== History ==
The name Ijebu-Igbo (Ijebu + forest) refers to the forested nature of this region within the larger Ijebu area. Ijebu-Igbo comprises five distinct towns: Okesopin, Ojowo, Atikori, Oke-Agbo, and Japara. According to oral tradition, the founder of Ijebu-Igbo was a skilled hunter who frequently hunted in the northern part of Odo-Oluiwa; an area near present day Ijebu Ode, where he was originally a prince. Following the sudden death of his father and the controversial accession of his younger brother, Ofiranoye, to the throne while he was away hunting, the prince identified as Onayelu; chose not to return to Ijebu Ode. Instead, he settled permanently in the area where he had been hunting, which is now known as Ijebu-Igbo.

The Ijebu Igbo forest reserve, known as the Omo forest reserve, is one of the twelve largest forest reserves in Nigeria.

A short introductory expose of Ijebu Igbo the ijebu dialect by a native speaker

- Ijebu Igbo Forest Reserve
- Queen Elizabeth forest reserve
- J1 forest reserve
- J2 forest reserve
- J3 forest reserve
- J4 forest reserve
- Apoje forest reserve and many more.

== People ==
The town's primary economic activities are timber, cocoa, and exploitation of mineral resources and it is home to many sawmills and also a developed quarry.

Like all other Ijebus, the people of Ijebu Igbo are very enterprising, industrious, religious and accommodating. Their entrepreneurial footprints can be seen in businesses and sectors like agriculture, sawmilling, food, and agro-processing, oil palm produce, real estate, education, hospitality, banking, oil and gas, media, fashion, and technology among others. They speak the Ijebu dialect, which is a dialect of the Yoruba language.

=== Classification ===
Ijebu Igbo is divided into five clans; Oke-Sopin, Oke-Agbo, Ojowo, Atikori, and Japara.

An Oba (king) is enthroned to govern each of these clans. These Obas are classified as "second-class" and they all submit to the headship of the Orimolusi of Ijebu-Igbo. The Orimolusi is a first-class Oba and he is the supreme head of Ijebu-Igbo.

=== Traditional Rulers in Ijebu-Igbo and its Environment ===
- The Orimolusi of Ijebu-Igbo
- The Ebumawe of Ago-Iwoye
- The Limeri of Awa
- The Alaporu of Ilaporu
- The Oloru of Oru-Ijebu
- The Sopenlukale of Oke Sopin
- The Bejeroku of Oke-Agbo
- The Olokine of Ojowo
- The Keegbo of Atikori
- The Abija Parako of Japara
- The Lowa of Asigidi.

== Government ==
The Orimolusi is the traditional ruler of Ijebu-Igbo land and a first-class Oba within the Ogun State traditional system.

The traditional authority of the Orimolusi is associated with multiple communities within the Ijebu-Igbo area and surrounding settlements in Ogun State.

== Local Community Development Areas ==
The local governments and LCDA are all under the authority of the Orimolusi of Ijebu Igbo( Oloja Igbo).

The last Orimolusi of Ijebu-Igbo was late Oba Samuel Adetayo Onasanya (Ikupakude IV), who died in 1994.

- Ijebu East Ogbere
- Ijebu East Central Ojowo
- Ijebu North Ijebu Igbo
- Ijebu North Central Oru
- Ijebu Igbo West Ojowo
- Ago Iwoye Ibipe
- Ijebu North East Atan
- Yemoji Ilese

== Geography ==
Ijebu Igbo is the second largest town in Ogun State and the largest among Ijebus in terms of land mass, there are arable land for farming.

Also there are hundreds of villages and hamlets under Ijebu Igbo. The town is bordered by Ibadan, Ikire, and Ondo.

== High Schools and Colleges ==
Ijebu Igbo boasts of many secondary schools, amongst which are two of the foremost secondary schools in Nigeria, Molusi College & Abusi Edumare Academy, founded on January 28, 1949 and January 1971 respectively.

Ijebu Igbo is also home to some higher institutions such as Abraham Adesanya Polytechnic (AAPOLY), established in 2004 and owned by Ogun State government, and Nigeria Prison Service Academy, a first of its kind institution in sub-Saharan Africa.

== Notable People from Ijebu Igbo ==
- Mike Adenuga (born 1953), businessman
- Abraham Adesanya (1922–2008), politician and lawyer
- Olabiyi Durojaiye (1933–2021), politician
- Buruji Kashamu (1958–2020), politician
