= Shuaibu Salisu =

Nigerian politician

Senator for Ogun Central
- Incumbent
- Assumed office 11 June 2023
- Preceded by: Ibikunle Amosun

Personal details
- Born: Abeokuta, Ogun State, Nigeria
- Party: All Progressives Congress (APC)
- Profession: Legislative aide

Shuaib Afolabi Salisu is a Nigerian senator for Ogun Central constituency of Ogun State since 2023. He previously served as the Chief of Staff to Governor Dapo Abiodun of Ogun state from 2019 to 2023.

== Senate career ==
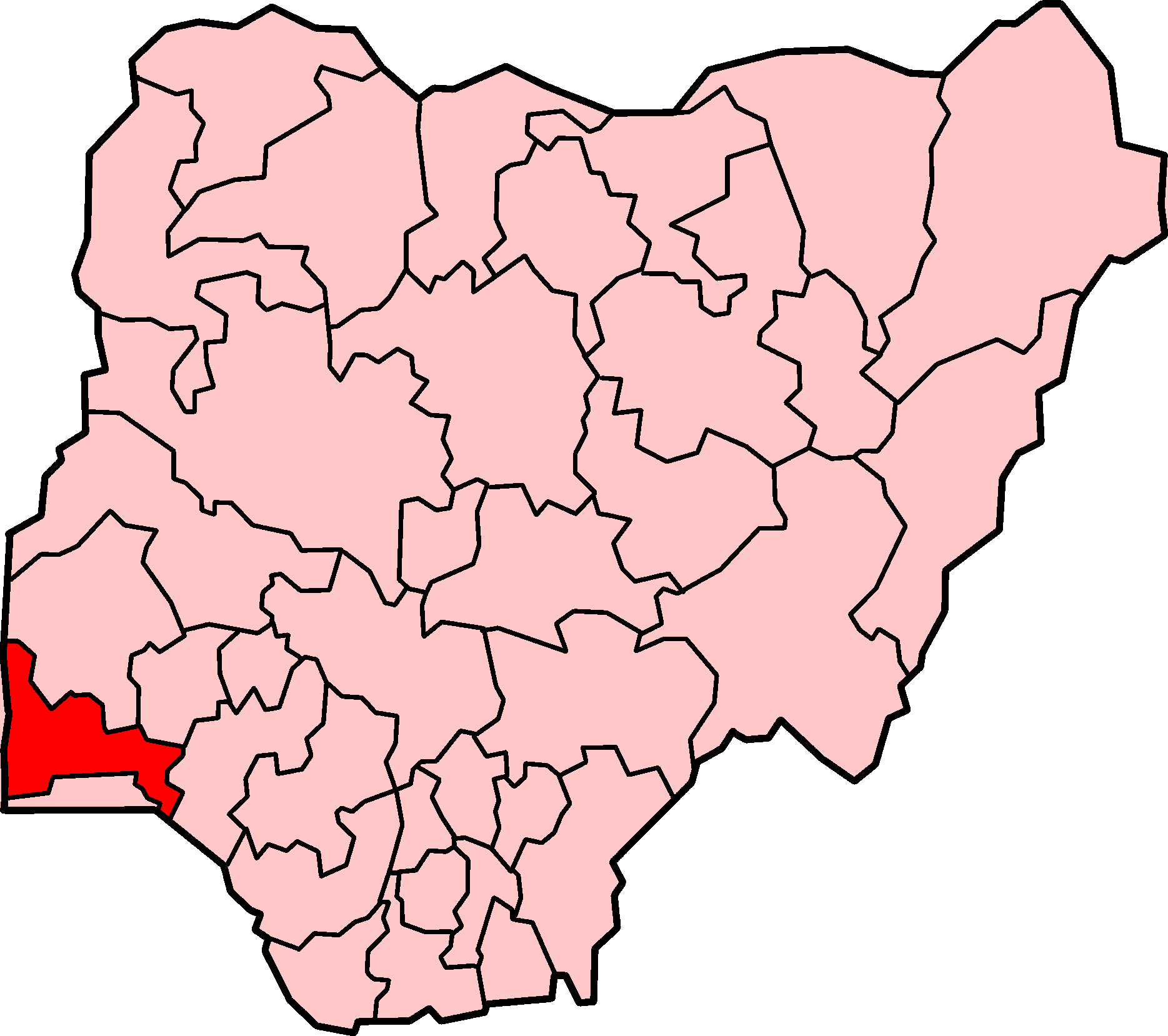
Ogun State in Nigeria

Salisu was elected to the National Senate for the Ogun West constituency in 2023, pulling a total of 96,759 votes to defeat his closest rival, Olumide Aderinokun of the People's Democratic Party (PDP), who pulled 52,440 votes. Since 2023, he has been the Chairman of the Senate Committee on ICT & Cyber Security and Vice Chairman of the Senate Committee on Media and Publicity.

== Role in Opposition to Huaxin–Lafarge Deal ==
In March 2025, Senator Salisu emerged as the principal figure behind the Nigerian Senate's attempt to halt the proposed acquisition of Lafarge Africa Plc by China's Huaxin Cement Co. The Senate, acting on his sponsored motion, directed the Bureau of Public Procurement to suspend the US$1 billion transaction, citing concerns over national security and economic sovereignty.

The Senate's sudden alarm came despite the fact that Lafarge Africa had long been majority-owned by Swiss multinational Holcim AG, which merged with Lafarge in 2015 and rebranded as Holcim Group in 2021. Holcim's planned divestment of its 83.8% stake to Huaxin included a matching offer to minority shareholders with a nearly 20% premium. Critics of the Senate's intervention noted the inconsistency in raising national security concerns now, when past foreign ownership had not attracted similar scrutiny.

Senator Jimoh Ibrahim (APC, Ondo South) warned against converting the Senate into a "sales Senate" and undermining regulatory authorities, while Senator Binos Yaroe (PDP, Adamawa Central) reminded colleagues that ownership changes in public companies are standard business practice. He cautioned against sending negative signals to foreign investors, especially given Nigeria's need for capital inflows. Some observers suggested the opposition may have been influenced by entrenched domestic competitors wary of Huaxin's market entry. Huaxin, unlike the relatively passive Holcim, has been rapidly expanding across Africa and is seen by analysts as a potential disruptor in Nigeria's cement industry, which is currently dominated by local giants such as Dangote Cement and BUA Cement. Senator Salisu's state of Ogun is home to the largest cement plant of Dangote Cement.
