= South West (Nigeria) =

- Interactive map of South West
- Country: Nigeria
- States: Ekiti State; Lagos State; Ogun State; Ondo State; Osun State; Oyo State
- Largest city: Lagos
- Major cities: Abeokuta; Ado Ekiti; Akure; Badagry; Ibadan; Ifẹ; Ijebu Ode; Ikorodu; Ilesa; Obafemi Owode; Ogbomosho; Ondo City; Osogbo; Ota; Owo; Oyo; Sagamu

Population (2022)
  - Total: 41,192,000
- Time zone: UTC+1 (WAT)
- Languages: French; English; Ewe; Gun; Hausa; Igbo; Itsekiri; Izon; Nigerian Sign Language; Yoruba

South-West among the six geopolitical zones of Nigeria.

The South West (often hyphenated to the South-West) is one of the six geopolitical zones of Nigeria representing both a geographic and political region of the country's southwest. It comprises six states which includes Ekiti, Lagos, Ogun, Ondo, Osun, and Oyo.

The zone stretches along the Atlantic seaboard from the international border with Benin Republic in the west to the South South in the east with the North Central to the north. The South West is split with the Central African mangroves in the coastal far south while the major inland ecoregions are the Nigerian lowland forests ecoregion in the south and east along with the Guinean forest–savanna mosaic ecoregion in the drier northwest. The weather conditions vary between Nigeria's two, distinctive seasons; the rainy season (March - November) and the dry season named the Harmattan (from November - February). The Harmattan is a dry and dusty northeasterly trade wind (of the same name), which blows from the Sahara over West Africa into the Gulf of Guinea. During this season, the wind transports the eponymous Harmattan dust, particles of fine Saharan sand.

Culturally, the vast majority of the zone falls within Yorubaland–the indigenous cultural homeland of the Yoruba people, a group which makes up the largest ethnic percentage of the southwestern population.

Linguistically, the South West is largely homogenous when compared to other regions in Nigeria, with Yoruba being the dominant language. There are, however, pockets of minor languages spoken in the region, particularly the Gun language spoken in Badagry and various indigenous communities along the Nigeria–Benin Republic border.

Economically, the South West's urban areas–mainly the cities of Lagos and Ibadan contributes greatly to the Nigerian economy while rural areas lag. The region has a population of over 50 million people, more than 22% of the total population of the country. Lagos is the most populous city in the South West as well as the most populous city in Nigeria and also the most populous city in Africa. The metropolis and its inner suburbs, together called the Lagos Metropolis Area, form the eighth largest metropolitan area in the world with about 21 million people; other large southwestern cities include (in order by population) Ibadan, Ogbomosho, Ikorodu, Akure, Abeokuta, Oyo, Ifẹ, Ondo City, Ado Ekiti, Iseyin, Sagamu, Badagry, Ilesa, Obafemi Owode, Osogbo, Eruwa, Ikare and Owo.

== Languages ==
The most widely spoken language in the South-West is Yoruba, one of the nation's most widely spoken indigenous languages and the native tongue of the Yoruba people, who constitute the largest ethnic group in the zone. Yoruba functions as both a mother tongue and a regional lingua franca, with numerous dialects spoken across the zone. Other indigenous languages spoken within the zone include Ewe and Gun — particularly in border communities and among migrants in the rest of the region — as well as Izon, which is spoken in southern Ondo State and Ijaw migrant communities.

In addition to indigenous languages, English — the official language of Nigeria — is widely spoken and serves as the primary language of business, education, and government throughout the zone. Along with standard English and Yoruba, Nigerian Pidgin English is also commonly used as a lingua franca.

Several non-indigenous Nigerian languages are also present due to internal migration, commerce, and regional integration. These languages — including Efik, Edo, Fulfulde, Hausa, Ibibio, Igbo, Nupe, and Urhobo — are spoken by sizable communities of non-indigenes from other parts of Nigeria along with their descendants. French is taught in educational institutions in addition to being spoken by cross-border traders and migrants from neighboring Francophone countries such as Benin, Ivory Coast, and Togo.

For sign languages, Nigerian Sign Language is used by members of the deaf community across the South-West with its forerunner American Sign Language being first used in Nigeria at the Ibadan Mission School for the Deaf in 1974. Additionally, Yoruba Sign Language is an indigenous community sign language used in the deaf community of Akure. Deaf education institutions operate in Eruwa, Ibadan, Lagos, and Ogbomosho.
