= 2019 Nigerian Senate elections in Ogun State =

The 2019 Nigerian Senate election in Ogun State held on February 23, 2019, to elect members of the Nigerian Senate to represent Ogun State. Ibikunle Amosun Oyelaja representing Ogun Central, Ramoni Olalekan Mustapha representing Ogun East, and Tolulope Akinyemi Odebiyi representing Ogun West all won on the platform of the All Progressives Congress.

== Overview ==
Affiliation	Party		Total
Affiliation	APC	PDP	Total
Before Election	2	1	3
After Election	3	0	3

== Summary ==
District	Incumbent	Party	Elected Senator	Party
Ogun East	Buruji Kashamu	PDP	Ramoni Olalekan Mustapha	APC
Ogun Central	Lanre Tejuosho	APC	Ibikunle Amosun	APC
Ogun West	Joseph Dada	APC	Tolulope Akinremi Odebiyi	APC

== Results ==
=== Ogun East ===
A total of 22 candidates registered with the Independent National Electoral Commission to contest in the election. APC candidate Ramoni Olalekan Mustapha won the election, defeating PDP candidate Sosanwo Adeola Ayoola and 20 other party candidates. Ramoni of APC received 44.21% of the votes, while Sosanwa received 43.07%

2019 Nigerian Senate election in Ogun State
Party	Candidate	Votes	%
APC	Ramoni Olalekan Mustapha	85,761	44.21%
PDP	Sosanwo Adeola Ayoola	83,528	43.07%
Others		24,674	12.72%
Total votes		193,963	100%
APC hold			

=== Ogun Central ===
A total of 19 candidates registered with the Independent National Electoral Commission to contest in the election. APC candidate Ibikunle Amosun Oyelaja won the election, defeating PDP candidate Solomon Abiodun Sanyaolu, ADC candidate Titilayo Oseni-Gomez and 16 other party candidates. Amosun of APC received 48.51% of the votes, Oseni-Gomez received 20.43% while Sanyaolu received 18.32%

2019 Nigerian Senate election in Ogun State
Party	Candidate	Votes	%
APC	Ibikunle Amosun	88,110	48.51%
PDP	Solomon Abiodun Sanyaolu	33,276	18.32%
ADC	Titilayo Oseni-Gomez	37,101	20.43%
Others		23,153	12.75%
Total votes		181,640	100%
APC hold			

=== Ogun West ===
A total of 20 candidates registered with the Independent National Electoral Commission to contest in the election. APC candidate Tolu Odebiyi won the election, defeating PDP candidate Abiodun Odunleye Odunjo, APM candidate Bolanle Olusegun Gbeleyi and 17 other party candidates. Tolu of APC received 29.36% of the votes, while Odunjo received 22.60%

2019 Nigerian Senate election in Ogun State
Party	Candidate	Votes	%
APC	Tolu Odebiyi	56,452	29.36%
PDP	Abiodun Odunjo	43,454	22.60%
Others		92,385	48.04%
Total votes		192,291	100%
APC hold			
