= Ijebu North =

- LGA
- Interactive map of Ijebu North
- Location in Nigeria
- Coordinates: 6°57′N 4°00′E
- Country: Nigeria
- State: Ogun State
- Headquarter: Ijebu Igbo

Government
  - Local Government Chairman: Odusanya Omobolaji (APC)

Area
  - Total: 967 km^{2} (373 sq mi)

Population (2006 census)
  - Total: 284,336
- Time zone: UTC+1 (WAT)
- 3-digit postal code prefix: 120
- ISO 3166 code: NG.OG.IJ

Ijebu North is a Local Government Area in Ogun State, Nigeria. Its headquarters are in the town of Ijebu Igbo at 6°57′N 4°00′E.

It has an area of 967 km^{2} and a population of 284,336 at the 2006 census.

The postal code of the area is 120.

The local government was established in 1979 and has its headquarters at Ijebu Igbo. It is bounded by Oluyole Local Government of Oyo State in the north, in the west by Ijebu East Local Government, in the south by Ijebu North East, Odogbolu and Ijebu Ode Local Government, and in the east by Ikenne Local Government. The region is partitioned into local wards Atikori, Oke-Agbo, Ojowo/Japara, Oke-Sopen, Ome, Oru-awa-ilaporu, Osun and Ago-Iwoye urban I, Ago-Iwoye urban II, Ako-Onigbagbo Gelete, and Mamu/Ehin-Etiri.

It plays host to Olabisi Onabanjo University (Annex campus).

This region is peopled by the Ijebus, who live in the following major towns: Ago-Iwoye, Oru, Awa, Ilaporu, etc. There are several markets in the town but the most popular of them all is Station Market. Also several indigenes of the town engage in timber business so there are many sawmills in the town.
