= Obafemi Owode =

LGA in Ogun state

Owode Owode Egba
- LGA and Town
- Obafemi Owode
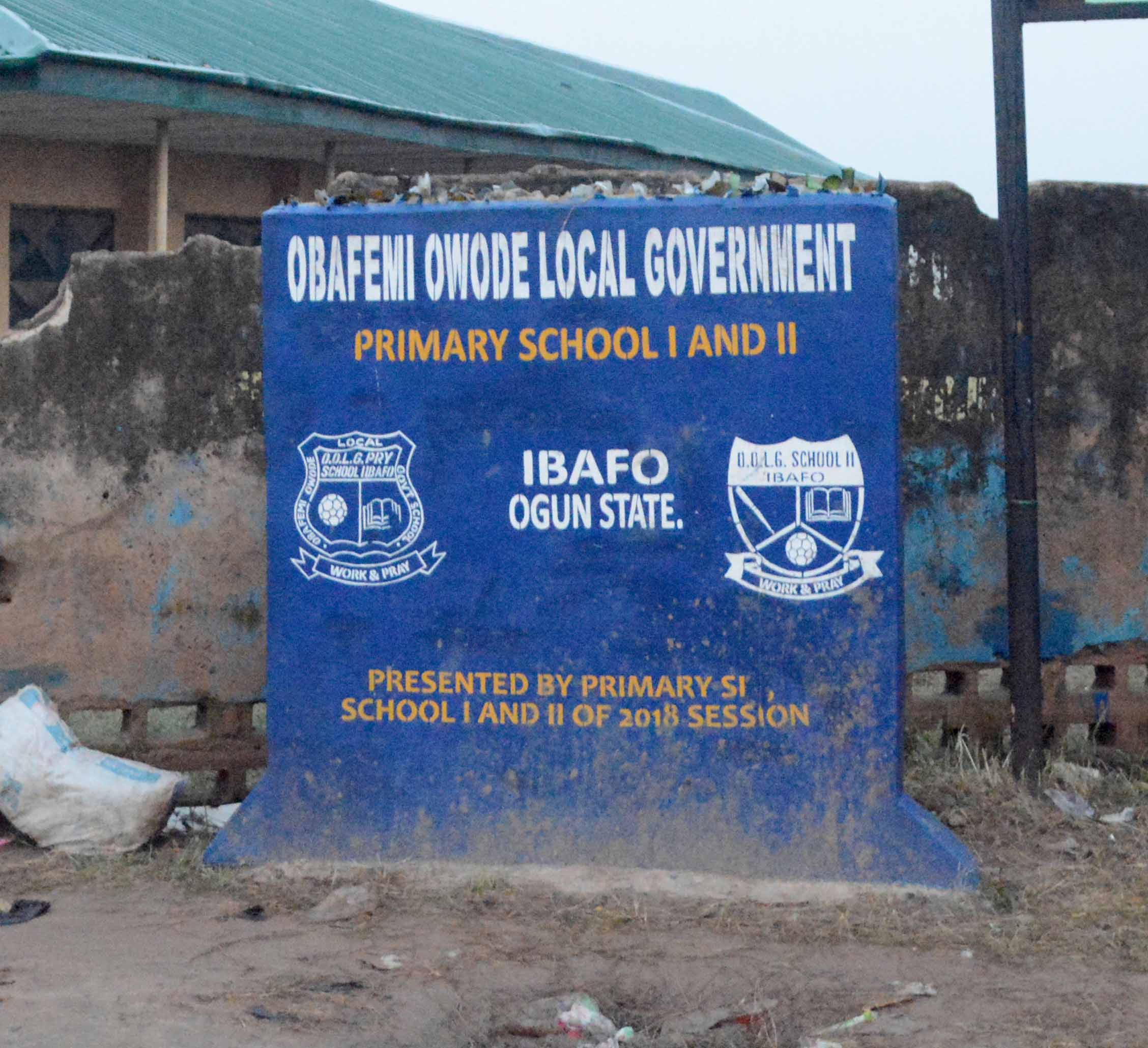
- Obafemi Owode sign board donated by schools
- Interactive map of Owode
- Location in Nigeria
- Coordinates: 6°57′N 3°30′E
- Country: Nigeria
- State: Ogun State

Government
  - Local Government Chairman: Adesina Ogunsola (APC)

Area
  - Total: 1,410 km^{2} (540 sq mi)

Population (2022)
  - Total: 399,800
- Time zone: UTC+1 (WAT)
- 3-digit postal code prefix: 110
- Area code: 110106
- ISO 3166 code: NG.OG.OO

Obafemi Owode or simply Owode is a town and Local Government Area in Ogun State, Nigeria.

It has an area of 1,410 km^{2} and a population of 228,851 at the 2006 census. The population was estimated to be 399,800 in 2022.

The postal code of the area is 110.

== Historical background ==
Obafemi Owode Local Government is one of the Local Governments that came into existence through Edict No.9 of 1976, resulting from the 1976 Local Government reforms, prior to this period, the administration of the area was carried out by Oba Provincial Authority, Owode District Council and Obafemi District Council.

Obafemi Owode Local Government has its headquarters at Owode Egba.

== Boundaries ==
Obafemi Owode Local Government shares common boundaries with the following Local and State Governments:

- North - Odeda Local Government and Oyo State
- East - Sagamu and Ikenne Local Governments
- South - Ifo Local Government and Lagos State

== Population and area ==
Population: Obafemi-Owode Local Government has an estimated population of 230,000.

Land mass: It is made up of about 1,204 towns and villages with a land mass of 104,787.07 hectares (258,934.5 acres) of largely agricultural land.

== People ==
Obafemi Owode Local Government is made up of people residing in Adigbe, Oba, Kobape, Obafemi, Ogunmakin, Ajebo, Owode, Mowe, Ibafo, Iro town and Mokoloki towns and they are mostly Egbas. Therefore the common language being spoken is the Yoruba with the Egba dialect. The traditional institution of the people is predominantly governed by Baales with the exception of a very early settlement called Iro town, Oba Sanusi Ogunrinde Oyero. Eribi IV (Late), followed by other towns like Ibafo, Ofada, Mokoloki, Owode and others during the administration of the former governor of the state Senator Ibikunle Amosun.

=== Culture ===
An insight into the cultural aspects of the people reveals that they are blessed with rich Yoruba traditional dances such as Ogodo dance, Egungun and Bolojo dances, in some areas of the Local Government.

== Infrastructural development ==
Obafemi Owode Local Government has some motorable (graded) roads which are linked by state and federal road network for inter and intra city connections.

The Federal roads running through the Local Government area include:

- Lagos-Ibadan Express way
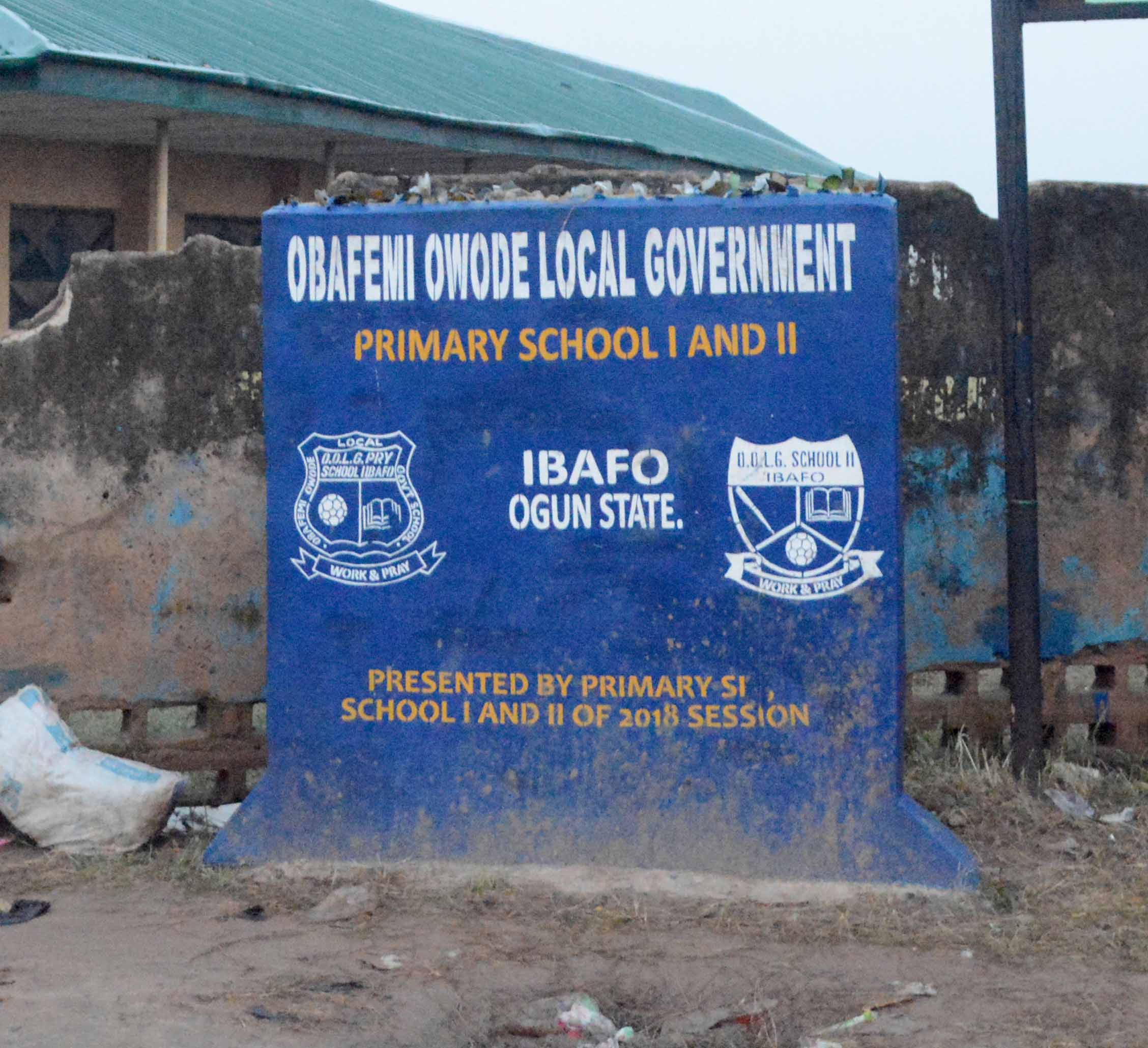
  Ibafo
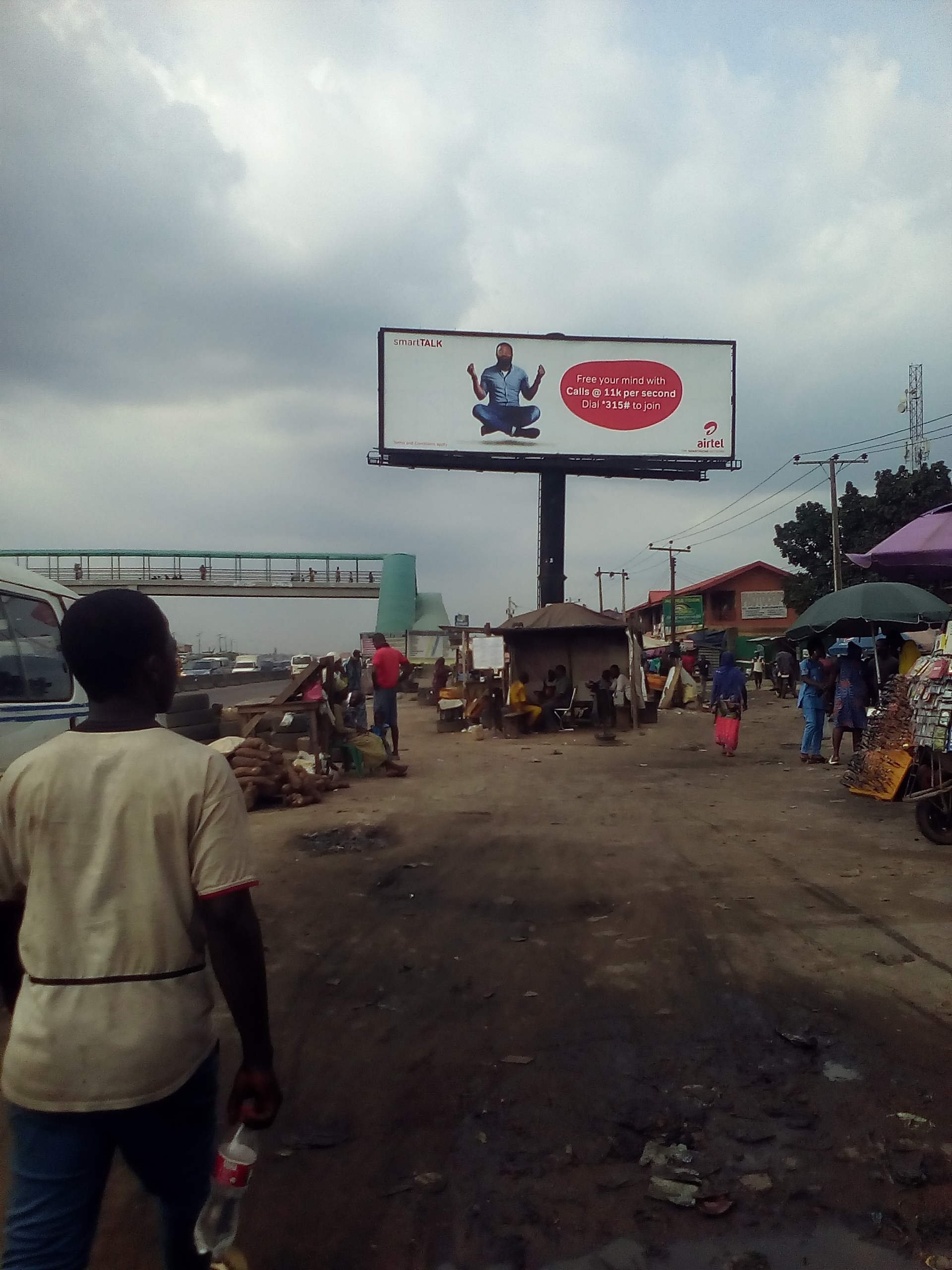
  Ibafo 5
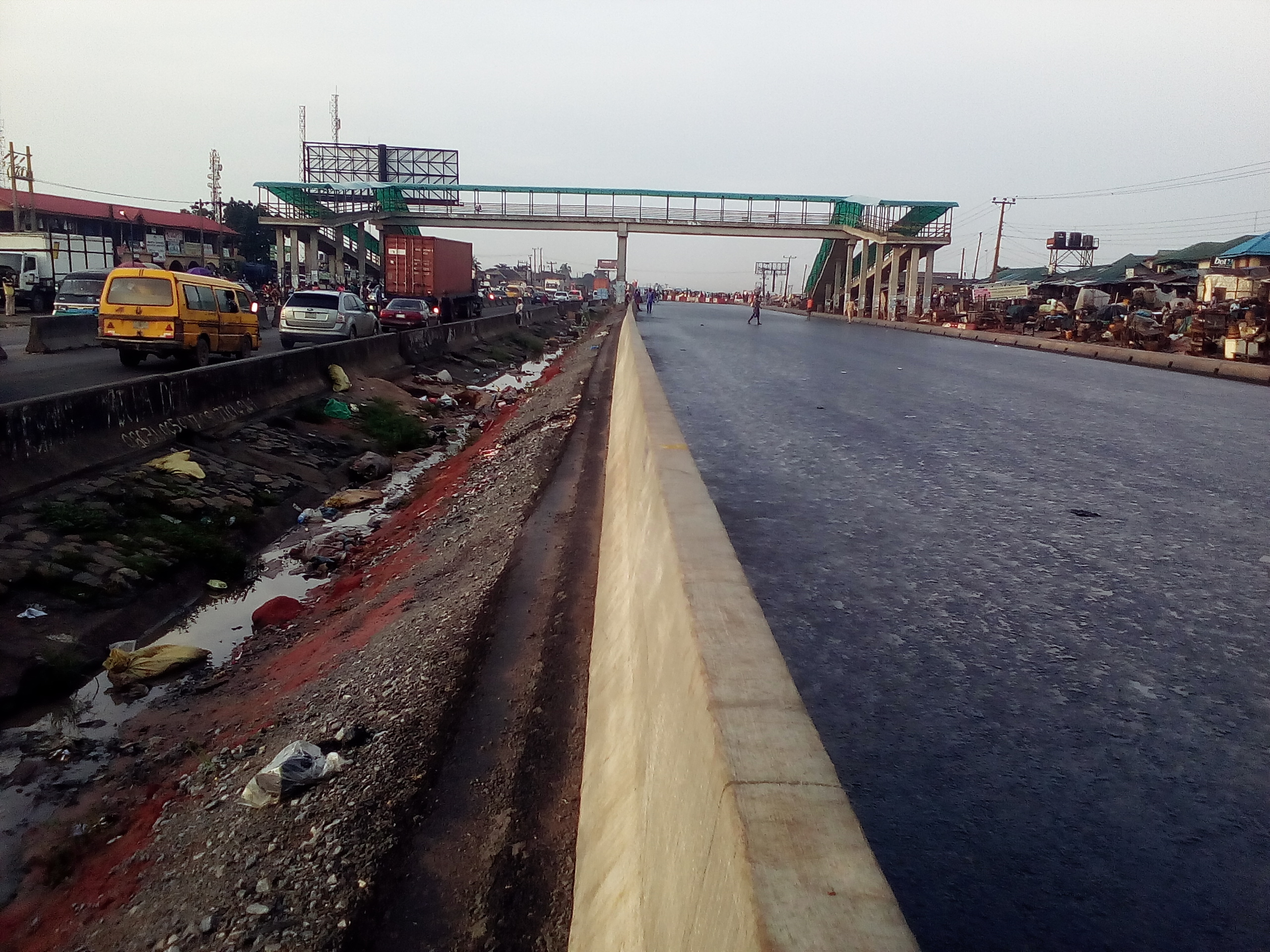
  Ibafo bridge 2
- Abeokuta-Sagamu road
- Sagamu-Papalanto road
- Pakuro-Magbon road (bad and abandoned road)

State roads within the area include:

- Owode-Siun-Ofada road
- Siun-Iperu road
- Owode-Obafemi road
- Kobape-Oba-Ojere road
- Idi-Aba-Ajebo road
- Ogunmakin-Ajebo road
- Ofada-Mowe road
- Pakuro-Ijere road (bad and abandoned road)

=== Health services ===
Obafemi Owode Local Government has competent staff and facilities. In all, there are 4 medical doctors and 46 para-medical staffers while there are 22 health clinics and 12 health posts. Both human and material resources are evenly spread all over the health districts. Recently commissioned, are two newly completed health clinics to boost the health projection plan of the Local Government.

Apart from the curative aspect of health, this Local Government attends to the preventive aspect particularly in the area of contagious diseases such as guinea-worm eradication and global 2001 programme. The Rotary Club of Ake, Abeokuta has also given support in this respect.

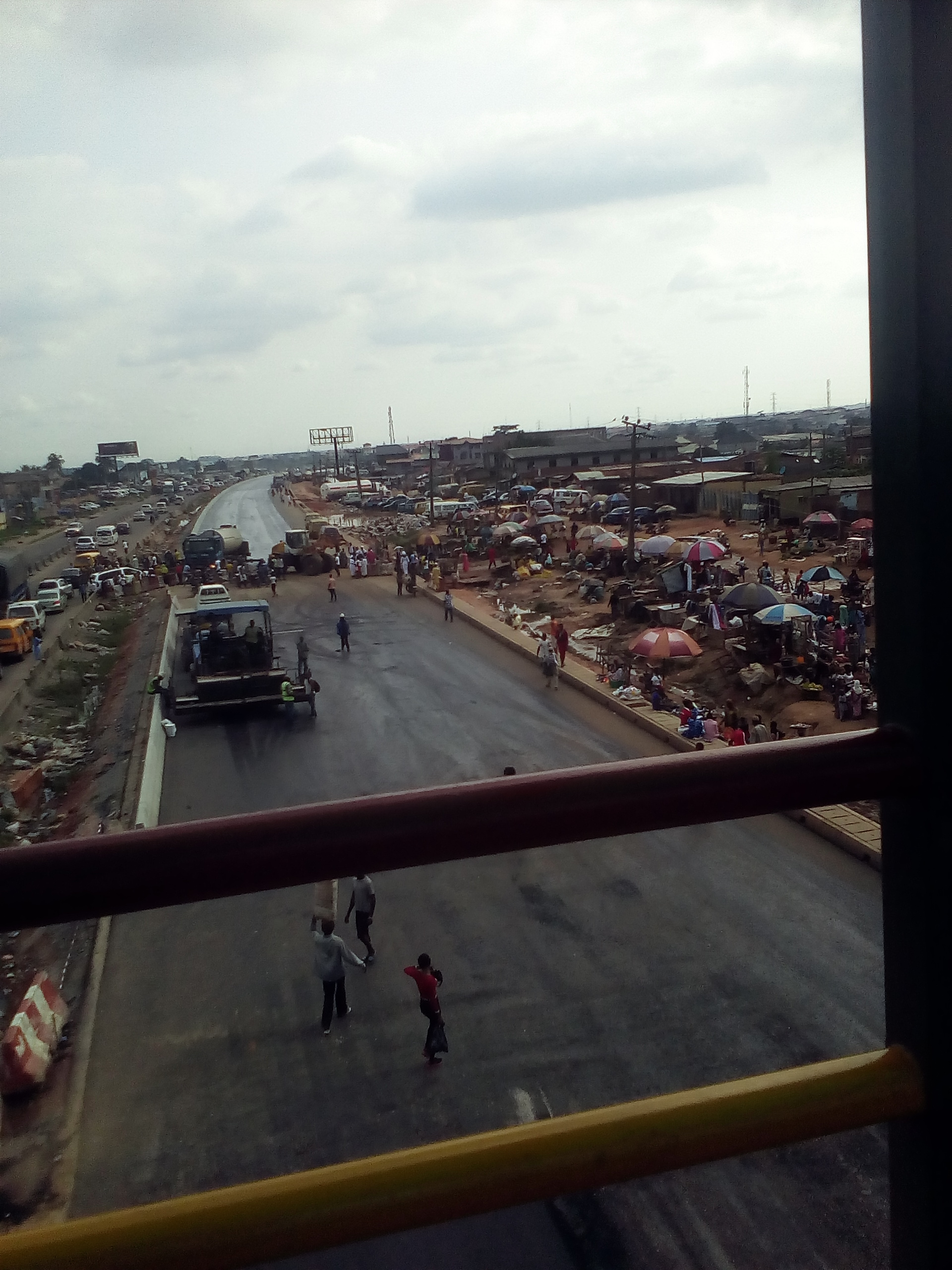
Aerial view of Ibafo

== Economic and investment opportunities ==
=== Agriculture ===
Obafemi Owode Local Government is endowed with vast fertile land suitable for the cultivation of rice, kolanut, sugarcane, maize, cassava, tomatoes and a wide variety of vegetables. The Local Government is generally regarded as the land of OFADA rice. The major food crops of the area includes cassava, rice, cocoyam, plantain, maize and vegetable, while palm produced and cocoa form the major cash crops.

=== Occupation ===
The people are predominantly farmers, most of whom engage themselves in farming of arable crops. There are also some who engage in livestock and fishing.

In recent times, however, the people of the area engage themselves in Quarry business, artisan works and handcrafts, such as dye making and pottery. The popular adire fabrics are also produced in some areas of the Local Government.

=== Major markets ===
The major markets in the area includes the Siun market, Ogunmakin market, Obafemi market, Mokoloki market, Mowe, Ibafo and Owode markets.

=== Tourism ===
Obafemi Owode Local Government has within it privately owned hotels for the relaxation and comfort of residents and visitors. Notable among these, are the Owode motel, based in Owode-Egba and the Don-Emilia Royal hotel based in Mowe-Ibafo.

Tourist attractions of the area include the wildlife forest of the area, grass less mountains found in some area and the Youth centre at Ofada town.

== Climate ==
In Owode, the rainy season is overcast, the dry season is partly overcast, and it is oppressive and hot year round.
