= Abeokuta South =

- LGA
- Interactive map of Abeokuta South
- Location in Nigeria
- Coordinates: 7°09′N 3°21′E
- Country: Nigeria
- State: Ogun State
- Headquarter: Ake Abeokuta

Government
  - Local Government Chairman: Balogun Olaniyi Afees (APC)
  - Vice Local Government Chairman: Chief (Mrs) Ogunmokun Oluranti Ogunjemilusi (APC)

Area
  - Total: 71 km^{2} (27 sq mi)

Population (2006 census)
  - Total: 250,278
  - Density: 3,500/km^{2} (9,100/sq mi)
- Time zone: UTC+1 (WAT)
- 3-digit postal code prefix: 110
- ISO 3166 code: NG.OG.AS

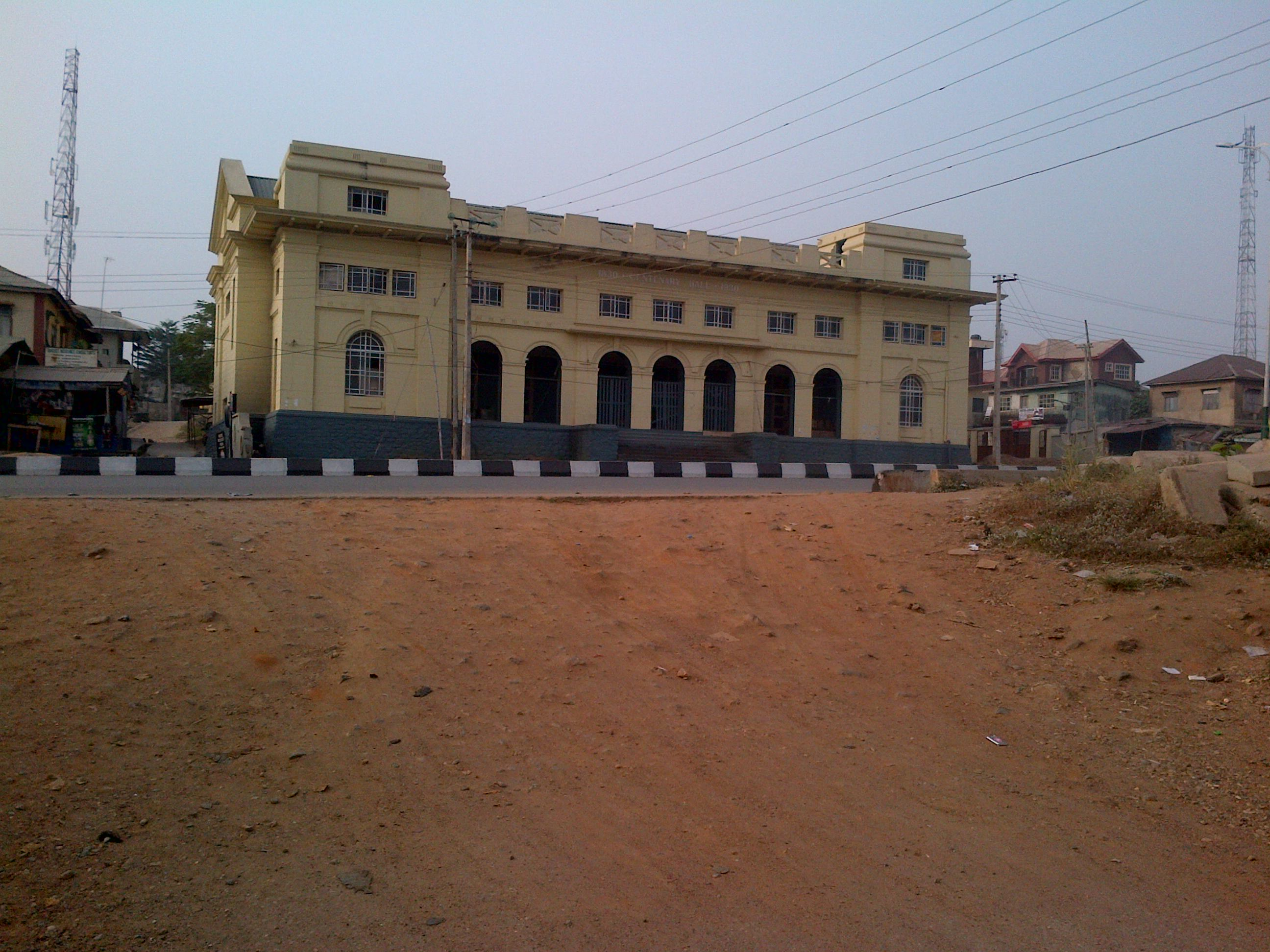
Centenary hall Ake Abeokuta, Ogun State

Abeokuta South is a Local Government Area in Ogun State, Nigeria. The headquarters of the LGA are at Ake Abeokuta at 7°09′00″N 3°21′00″E.

It has an area of 71 km^{2} and a population of 250,278 at the 2006 census.

The postal code of the area is 110.

It was represented by Dimeji Bankole, the former speaker of the House of Representatives, from 2003 to 2011.

== See also ==
Abeokuta
