= Yewa South =

- LGA
- Interactive map of Yewa South
- Location in Nigeria
- Coordinates: 6°48′N 2°57′E
- Country: Nigeria
- State: Ogun State
- Headquarter: Ilaro

Government
  - Local Government Chairman: Salami Lateef Adebayo (APC)

Area
  - Total: 629 km^{2} (243 sq mi)

Population (2006 census)
  - Total: 168,850
  - Density: 268/km^{2} (695/sq mi)
- Time zone: UTC+1 (WAT)
- 3-digit postal code prefix: 111
- ISO 3166 code: NG.OG.ES

Yewa South, (formerly Egbado South), is a Local Government Area in the west of Ogun State, Nigeria bordering the Republic of Benin. Its headquarters are in the town of Ilaro at 6°53′00″N 3°01′00″E in the north of the area.

It has an area of 629 km^{2} and a population of 168,850 at the 2006 census.

The postal code of the area is 111.( zip code 112061)

The area has 10 wards, Ilaro I, Ilaro II, Ilaro III, Iwoye, Idogo, Owode I, Owode II, Ilobi/Erinja, Oke-Odan and Ajilete.

The people speak the Yewa dialects of the Yoruba language as well as Ogu language of gbè language family, called “Ègùn” by the Yorùbá language speakers. There are seven areas or villages headed by Obas or Royal Fathers: Ilaro, Idogo, Iwoye, Oke-Odan, Ijanna, Itoro, Owode, Erinja, Ajilete and Ilobi.

Other towns and villages within the local government area are Olute, Iweke, Ipaja, Itolu, Eredo, Abule Olopa, idologum, Pahayi, Fagbohun, and Ol okuta.
