= Ogun Waterside =

Ogun Waterside Ebute Ogun
- LGA
- Interactive map of Ogun Waterside
- Location in Nigeria
- Coordinates: 6°29′N 4°24′E
- Country: Nigeria
- State: Ogun State
- Headquarter: Abigi

Government
  - Local Government Chairman & Head of Local Council: Adekunle Abdulateef Mudashiru (APC)

Area
  - Total: 1,000 km^{2} (390 sq mi)

Population (2016 estimate)
  - Total: 103,200
  - Density: 103.2/km^{2} (267/sq mi)
  - Ethnicities: Yoruba (Ijebu Ikale and Ilaje)
- Time zone: UTC+1 (WAT)
- 3-digit postal code prefix: 122
- ISO 3166 code: NG.OG.OW

Ogun Waterside is a Local Government Area in Ogun State, Nigeria. It is the only area of the state with a coastline on the Bight of Benin and also borders Lekki Lagoon. Its headquarters are in the town of Abigi at 6°29′N 4°24′E. Other towns and villages in the local government include: Ilushin, Lukogbe, Iwopin, Olojumeta, Makun Omi, Agbure, Ode Omi, Ibu, Itebu Manuwa, Ibiade, Efire, Lomiro, Oni, Ayede, Igele, Ayila, Irokun and Araromi seaside.

== Geography ==
Ogun waterside has an area of 1,000 km^{2} and an estimated population of 103,200 as in 2016 resulting in a population density of 103.2 per square kilometre (267/mi^{2}). The population growth rate is +3.35% per year. It is bordered by Ijebu East local government to the Northwest, Odigbo, Okitipupa and Ilaje local government areas of Ondo state to the Northeast, East and Southeast respectively, Epe local government of Lagos state to the West, and the Atlantic Ocean to the South.

The postal code of the area is 122.

== History and traditional institutions ==
Ogun waterside is composed mainly of the Ijebu, the Ilaje and the Ikale. All groups largely observe similar customs and uphold the same traditions as other yorubas, but shaped to a large extent by their amphibious environment among swamps, large water bodies such as creeks, rivers and lagoons as well as forests.

=== Traditional rulers ===
Traditional rulers in Ogun waterside are known as Obas and Olojas, among which are the following.

- Lenuwa of Ode Omi.
- Liken of Iwopin.
- Onipe of Ibu.
- Oloja of Ayede.
- Elero of Itebu Manuwa.
- Onirokun of Irokun.
- Alarige of Ibiade.
- Onisin of Ilusin.
- Ojotumoro of Abigi.
- Elefire of Efire
- Osobia of Makun omi
- Oloni of Oni

== Attractions ==
- Iwopin boat regatta
- Awodikora Okun beach side
- Illushin Rubber estate
