= Ikenne =

- LGA and Town
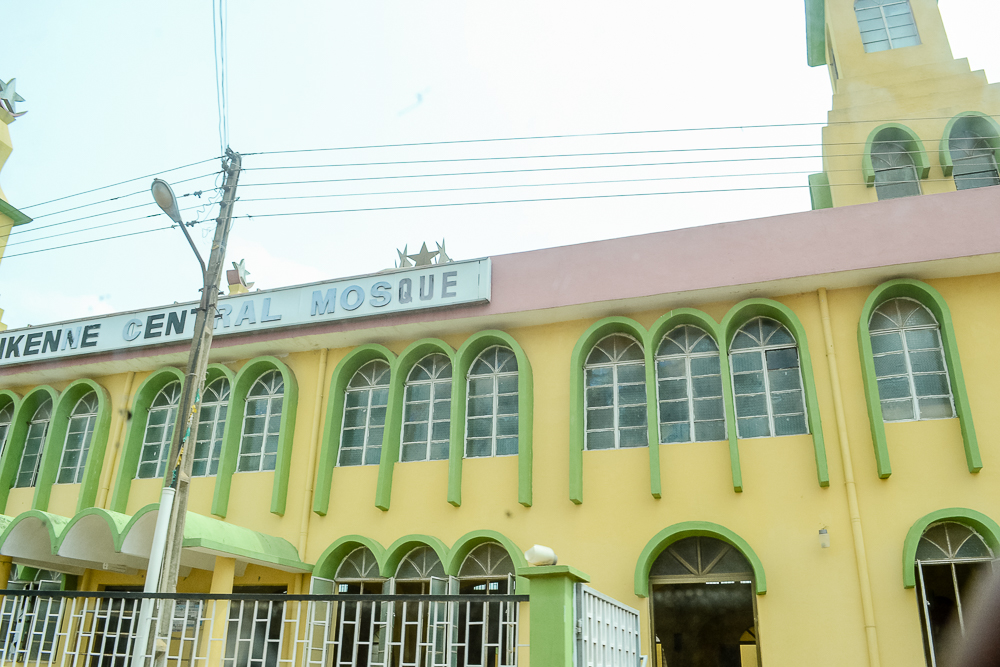
- Interactive map of Ikenne
- Location in Nigeria
- Coordinates: 6°52′N 3°43′E
- Country: Nigeria
- State: Ogun State

Government
  - Local Government Chairman: Jamiu Asimi (APC)

Area
  - Total: 144 km^{2} (56 sq mi)

Population (2006 census)
  - Total: 118,735
  - Density: 825/km^{2} (2,140/sq mi)
- Time zone: UTC+1 (WAT)
- 3-digit postal code prefix: 121
- ISO 3166 code: NG.OG.IK

Ikenne is a town and Local Government Area in Ogun State, Nigeria.

It has an area of 144 km^{2} and a population of 118,735 at the 2006 census.

The postal code of the area is 121.

== Wards in Ikenne ==
1. Ikenne i
2. Ikenne ii
3. Ilisan i
4. Ilisan ii
5. Irolu
6. Iperu i
7. Iperu ii
8. Iperu iii
9. Ogere i
10. Ogere ii

== Notable people in Ikenne ==
- Obafemi Awolowo
- Yemi Osibajo
- Kunle Soname
- Remsport
