= Ewekoro =

- LGA
- Interactive map of Ewekoro
- Location in Nigeria
- Coordinates: 6°56′N 3°13′E
- Country: Nigeria
- State: Ogun State
- Headquarter: Itori

Government
  - Local Government Chairman: Adesina Sikiru Adisa (APC)

Area
  - Total: 594 km^{2} (229 sq mi)

Population (2006 census)
  - Total: 55,156
  - Density: 92.9/km^{2} (240/sq mi)
- Time zone: UTC+1 (WAT)
- 3-digit postal code prefix: 112
- ISO 3166 code: NG.OG.EW

Ewekoro is a Local Government Area in Ogun State, Nigeria. Its headquarters are in the town of Itori, at 6°56′00″N 3°13′00″E.

It has an area of 594 km^{2} and a population of 55,156 at the 2006 census.

The postal code of the area is 112.

Ewekoro LGA is of great economic importance to the local economy as it being quarried for a production of cement by Lafarge (West African Portland Cement Company) Ewekoro and Dangote group. The cement has been quarried since the year 1959, which was the start of Lafarge cement in the country of Nigeria. Despite being underdeveloped, Ewekoro has the potential to be, a favorable destination to potential investments due to its proximity to the two largest cities in the south west of Nigeria.
