= Abeokuta North =

- LGA
- Interactive map of Abeokuta North
- Location in Nigeria
- Coordinates: 7°12′N 3°12′E
- Country: Nigeria
- State: Ogun State
- Headquarter: Akomoje

Government
  - Local Government Chairman: Adebayo Ayorinde (APC)

Area
  - Total: 808 km^{2} (312 sq mi)

Population (2006 census)
  - Total: 201,329
  - Density: 249/km^{2} (645/sq mi)
- Time zone: UTC+1 (WAT)
- 3-digit postal code prefix: 110
- ISO 3166 code: NG.OG.AN

Abeokuta North is a Local Government Area in Ogun State, Nigeria. Its headquarters are in the town of Akomoje, near Abeokuta. It has an area of 808 km^{2} and a population of 201,329 at the 2006 census.

The local government area includes the Oyan Dam, an important source of water to the cities of Lagos and Abeokuta. Communities who rely on the Oyan lake for fishing and water supply show high levels of urinary Schistosoma infection.

The postal code of the area is 110.

== See also ==
- Abeokuta North constituency
