= Ifo, Ogun State =

Ifo Ifọ̀
- LGA and Town
- Nickname: E4, Home of Harmony
- Motto: sha sha
- Interactive map of Ifo
- Location in Nigeria
- Coordinates: 6°49′N 3°12′E
- Country: Nigeria
- State: Ogun State

Government
  - Local Government Chairman: Hon. Idris Olalekan Kusimo (KUSH) (APC)

Area
  - Total: 521 km^{2} (201 sq mi)

Population (2006 census)
  - Total: 524,837
  - Density: 1,010/km^{2} (2,610/sq mi)
- Time zone: UTC+1 (WAT)
- 3-digit postal code prefix: 112
- ISO 3166 code: NG.OG.IF
- National language: Yorùbá

Ifo is a town and local government area in Ogun State, Nigeria. It has an area of 521 km^{2} (201 sq mi) and a population of 698,837 at the 2006 census. The postal code of the area is 112.

Major communities in Ifo local government area include Ifo Town, Agbado, Giwa Oke Aro, Akute Ajuwon, Ibogun, Coker Ilepa, Ibaragun, Lemode, Robiyan, Ope Ilu, Itoki, Mapara town, Adiyan, Matogun village, Matogun village, Abule Ekun village, Orile ifo town. The paramount traditional ruler and permanent Chairman Obas Council in IFO LGA is Olofin of Isheri Oba (Engr) Sulaiman Adekunle Bamgbade he is also the only king in the Chief law of Ogun state with prescribed authority to appoint Baale in IFO Local government Area in general as Gazetted in 1980. Also, a permanent member of the Ogun/ State Council of Obas.

== Transportation ==
Ifo is connected to nearby Lagos by a railway that was completed in 1899, with a length of 77 kilometres (48 mi). Roads connect it to Lagos as well as Abeokuta, Ilaro, Shagamu, Itori, and Ketou.

== Languages ==
The main language is the Egba dialects of the Yoruba language.

== Nearby localities ==
Nearby major towns include Soyinka Alaja, Iyana Cele, Igbusi, Ilepa, Onihale, Pakoto, Kajola, Lisa, Oyero, Arepo, Seriki, Coker, Ibogun, Matogun, Lambe, Alagbole, Ajuwon and Akute, Ojodu, Isheri all of which constitute their own communities with their own traditional rulers (Obas and Baale's). Together these areas make up Ifo Division. Ifo Division has a large industrial area containing several factories. The town of Ifo itself is home to branches of several established Nigerian banks. Ifo is the fastest growing part-market of the Ogun metropolis, owing in part to increasing influxes of people from Ifo's surrounding towns and villages who are attracted by the town's proximity to Lagos State.

== Religion and Tradition ==
Inhabitants of Ifo include adherents to several religions, including Isese, Christianity, and Islam. The traditional leader of the people is the Olu Ifo of Ifo land.

== Education ==
Within greater Ifo, there are more than 5 public primary schools and 10 secondary schools. There are also several private nurseries, primary and secondary schools, and 2 tertiary institutions.

Local schools include:

- The prime scholar's school, Ifo
- Bookers International School, Ifo
- Rex-Age transnational School
- Emili-Obadina Memorial school, Ajowa.
- Community primary school, Agosi
- The Nations Talents school, Ifo.
- Astute college
- Rabbi Comprehensive College
- Government Primary School 1,2,3
- Abekoko Grammar School
- Nawair u Deen Grammar School
- Great Grace Secondary School, Onihale
- Great Grace Children Academy, Onihale
- Ifo High School
- Adenrele High School
- Don Phillips group of schools
- Estad group of schools, Olose, Ifo
- Leah's primary school
- Temperance comprehensive college
- Methodist high school
- Government Technical College, Olose, Ifo
- Oke pata Senior govt College
- Martins Montessori College
- Toaz Primary School
- Step Up group of school
- Pakoto High School
- Solu Senior Grammar School
- Ireti Olu Model college, Ifo
- Access model college
- Ifo City Polytechnic, Ifo
- Moboluwaduro High School, Gasoline
- Community High School, Okungbolu
- Saint Agnes Private High School, Adiyan
- Vital link international school, Agosi, Ifo
- Ar nur International College, Ifo
- Adnaps group of schools
- Double crown group of schools
- New Life Secondary School, Ifo
- Ajuwon High School, Iju Ajuwon
- Breakthrough Academy, Awo Akute
- God's Grace School
- Ifo college of technology, Tecno-Bus/stop

Olabisi Onabanjo University is a public university located in the Ibogun area of the town.
