= Odeda =

- LGA and town
- Motto: Odeda PAPADA
- Interactive map of Odeda
- Location in Nigeria
- Coordinates: 7°13′55″N 3°31′38″E
- Country: Nigeria
- State: Ogun State

Government
  - Local Government Chairman and the Head of the Local Government Council: Folasade Adeyemo (APC)

Area
  - Total: 1,560 km^{2} (600 sq mi)

Population (2006 census)
  - Total: 109,449
  - Density: 70.2/km^{2} (182/sq mi)
- Time zone: UTC+1 (WAT)
- 3-digit postal code prefix: 110
- ISO 3166 code: NG.OG.OD

Odeda (or Awdeda) is a Local Government Area and town in Ogun State, Nigeria. The headquarters of the LGA are at Odeda on the A5 highway.

It has an area of 1,560 km^{2} and a population of 109,449 at the 2006 census. The local government is bounded at Bakatare. A small village close to Oyo State and also bounded at Alogi, a big urban centre that bound the local government area from Abeokuta-south.

The important landmarks in odeda includes Odeda farm institute, a Catholic church, odeda market, a police station, a quarry and the rail line that heads to Ibadan

The postal code of the area is 110.
