= Odogbolu =

Ijebu Odogbolu
- LGA and town
- Interactive map of Ijebu Odogbolu
- Location in Nigeria
- Coordinates: 6°46′N 3°48′E
- Country: Nigeria
- State: Ogun State

Government
  - Local Government Chairman: Dr. Babatunde Oyetola Diya(APC)

Area
  - Total: 541 km^{2} (209 sq mi)

Population (2006 census)
  - Total: 127,123
  - Density: 235/km^{2} (609/sq mi)
- Time zone: UTC+1 (WAT)
- 3-digit postal code prefix: 120
- ISO 3166 code: NG.OG.OB

Odogbolu is a town and Local Government Area in Ogun State, Nigeria.

It has an area of 541 km^{2} and a population of 127,123 at the 2006 census.

The postal code of the area is 120.

Oladipo Diya, the de facto Vice President of Nigeria during the Sani Abacha military junta from 1994, was born in Odogbolu.

The King is called Alaye of Odogbolu, in the person of Oba Adedeji Olusegun Onagoruwa
