= Ijebu North East =

- LGA
- Interactive map of Ijebu North East
- Location in Nigeria
- Coordinates: 6°54′N 4°01′E
- Country: Nigeria
- State: Ogun State
- Headquarter: Atan

Government
  - Local Government Chairman: Folusho Badejo (APC)

Area
  - Total: 118 km^{2} (46 sq mi)

Population (2006 census)
  - Total: 67,634
  - Density: 573/km^{2} (1,480/sq mi)
- Time zone: UTC+1 (WAT)
- 3-digit postal code prefix: 120
- ISO 3166 code: NG.OG.IN

Ijebu North East is a Local Government Area in Ogun State, Nigeria. Its headquarters is in the town of Atan at 6°54′N 4°01′E. The LGA has an area of 118 km^{2} (46 mi^{2}).

The postal code of the area is 120.
