= Babatunde =

Nigerian given name

- Gender: Male
- Language: Yoruba

Origin
- Meaning: Father returns, or father has returned

Other names
- Variant forms: Babajide; Babatunji; Babawande; Babaside; Babatide; Bababode; Tunde
- Related names: Yetunde
- See also: Yetunde, Tunde

Babatunde // (variant forms: Babatunji, Babajide, Babawande, Babaside, Babatide, Bababode) is a male given name. In the Yoruba language, it means 'father returns', or 'a father has returned'. This generally refers to a male ancestor such as a deceased father, grandfather, or great-grandfather.

== People named Babatunde ==
=== As a given name ===
- Babatunde Adebimpe, American actor and musician known professionally as Tunde Adebimpe
- Babatunde Aiyegbusi, Polish-Nigerian wrestler and former American football player
- Babatunde Agunloye, Canadian-based Nigerian film director and producer
- Babatunde Aléshé, British actor, writer and comedian
- Samuel Babatunde Bajah, Nigerian educator
- Babatunde Elegbede, military governor of Cross State, Nigeria, 1978–1979
- Babatunde Fashola, Nigerian politician; Minister of Power, Works and Housing, 2015–present; governor of Lagos State, 2007–2015
- Bomani Babatunde Jones, American sports journalist
- Babatunde Jose (1925–2008), Nigerian journalist
- Babatunde Lawal, Nigerian art historian in the United States
- Babatunde Lea, Afro-Cuban and worldbeat percussionist
- Babajide Ogunbiyi, American soccer player
- Babawande Olabisi, Nigerian-American baseball player known as Wande Olabisi
- Babatunde Olatunji, Nigerian drummer
- Babatunji Olowofoyeku, Nigerian lawyer, politician and educator
- Babatunde Oladotun (born 2008), American high school basketball player
- Babatunde Ogunnaike, Nigerian-American chemical engineer
- Babatunde Oshinowo, NFL player
- Babatunde Osotimehin, Nigerian politician; Minister of Health, 2007–2010
- Akinwande Oluwole Babatunde Soyinka, Nigerian Nobel laureate
- Babatunde Wusu, Nigerian-Finnish football striker
- Babatunde Yusuf, Nigerian football player

=== As a surname ===
- Babajide Collins Babatunde, Nigerian-born, Russian-based footballer
- Badmus Babatunde, Nigerian footballer
- Ibrahim Babatunde, Nigerian-born, Italian-based footballer
- Michael Babatunde, Nigerian footballer
- Obba Babatundé, American actor of stage and screen

== See also ==
- Yetunde
- Tunde
