= Adire (textile art) =

Dyed cloth made by the Yoruba people

Adire (Yoruba: Àdìrẹ) textile is a type of dyed cloth traditionally made by Yoruba women, using a variety of resist-dyeing techniques. This can be achieved through tie-dying, hand painting, stenciling, and stitched patterning.

Adire Symbols of the Adire Eleko type

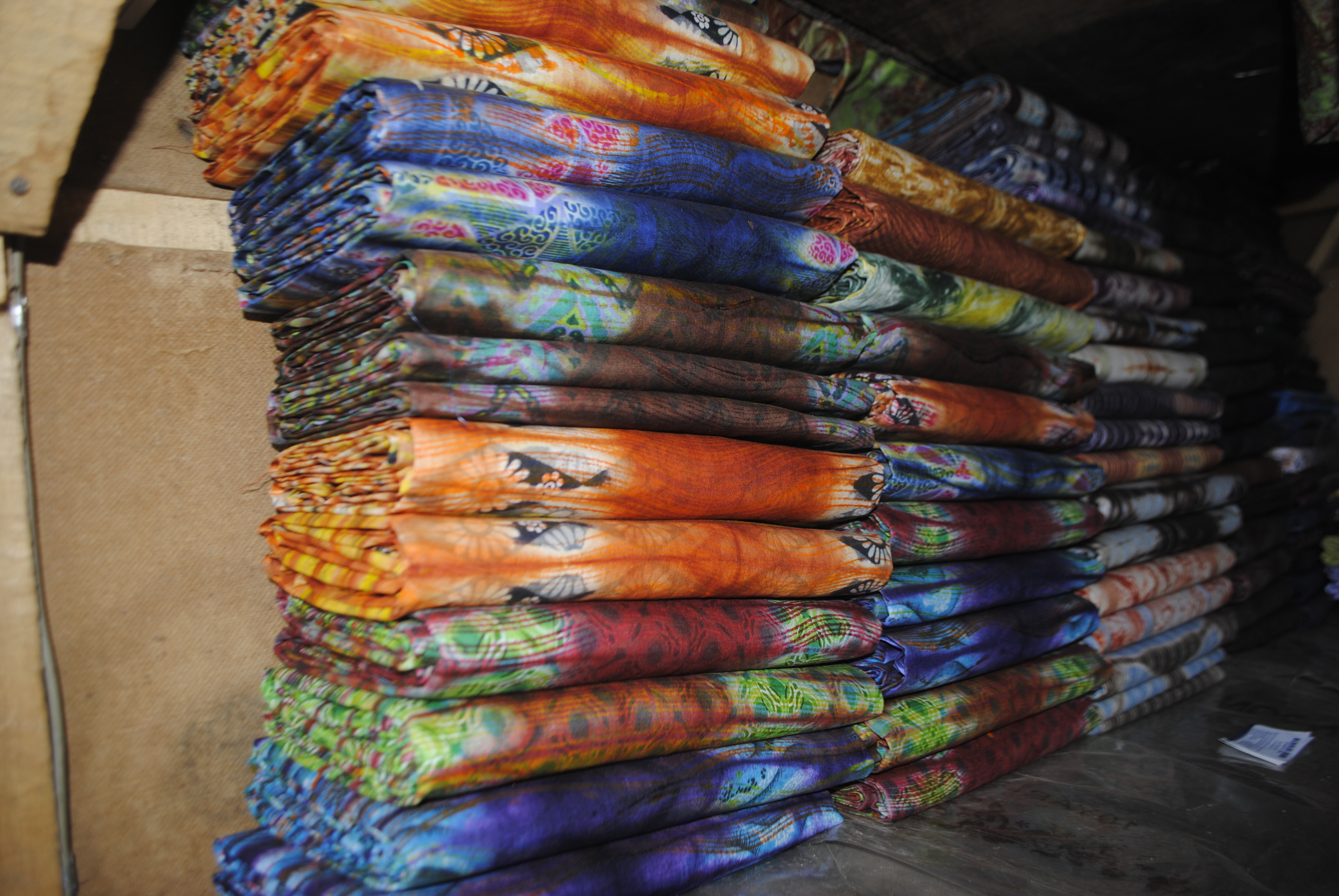
Bale of multicoloured Adire of the Oniko type

The word 'Adire' originally derives from the Yoruba words 'adi' which means to tie and 're' meaning to soak. It is a material designed with wax-resist methods that produce patterned designs in dazzling arrays of tints and hues. It is common among the Egba people of Ogun State. Adire artisans are renowned for their expertise in traditional Yoruba textile dyeing, where they create unique and intricate designs on fabric through a resist-dyeing process. They skillfully transform plain cloth into vibrant and culturally significant pieces of art which often involves meaningful Adire Symbols.

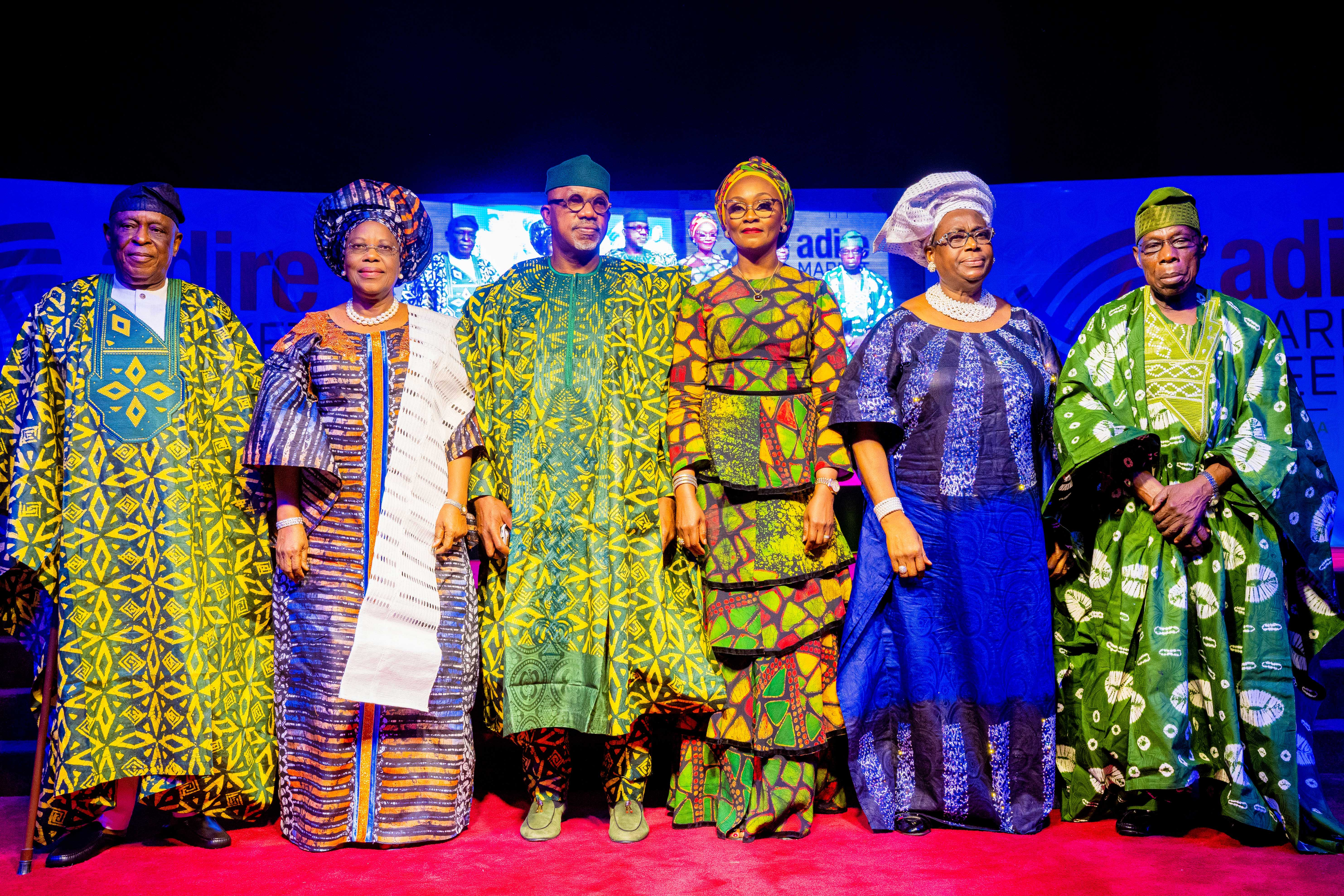
Former Nigerian president Olusegun Obasanjo and his wife, with the former governor of Ogun State, Segun Osoba, and his wife, and Governor Dapo Abiodun of Ogun State and his wife Bamidele Abiodun at the main stage of Adire Market Week, 9 April 2022

== History ==
Initially produced in south-western Nigeria, adire textiles traveled to northern Africa through Yoruba traders and trader families. Some families who chose to migrate up north began creating adire cloths to market to other women. Because it is usually made by women, patterns and themes of the Adire are passed down from mother to daughter within families. However, certain motifs can depend on the artist's abilities and craftmanship, as well as skills taught from older generations. The patterns of Adire are often representations of plants, animals, tools, and conceptual themes. Traditional themes are categorized into geometric, figural, skewmorphic, letters, and celestiomorphic types.

The earliest pieces of this type were probably simple tied designs on cotton cloth, handspun and woven locally (rather like those still produced in Mali). In the early decades of the 20th century came new access to large quantities of imported shirting material via the spread of European textile merchants in Abeokuta and other Yoruba towns that caused a boom in these women's entrepreneurial and artistic efforts, making adire a major local craft in Abeokuta and Ibadan that attracted buyers from all over West Africa. Abeokuta is considered to be the capital of adire-making in Nigeria; however, some suggest that the large cities of Ibadan and Osogbo (Yorubaland) are more important in adire-making because adire dyeing began in Abeokuta when Egba women from Ibadan returned with this knowledge. The cloth's basic shape became that of two pieces of shirting material stitched together to create a woman's wrapper cloth. New techniques of resist dyeing developed.

The tradition of indigo dyeing goes back centuries in West Africa. The earliest known example is a cap from the Dogon kingdom in Mali dating to the 11th century, dyed in the oniko style.

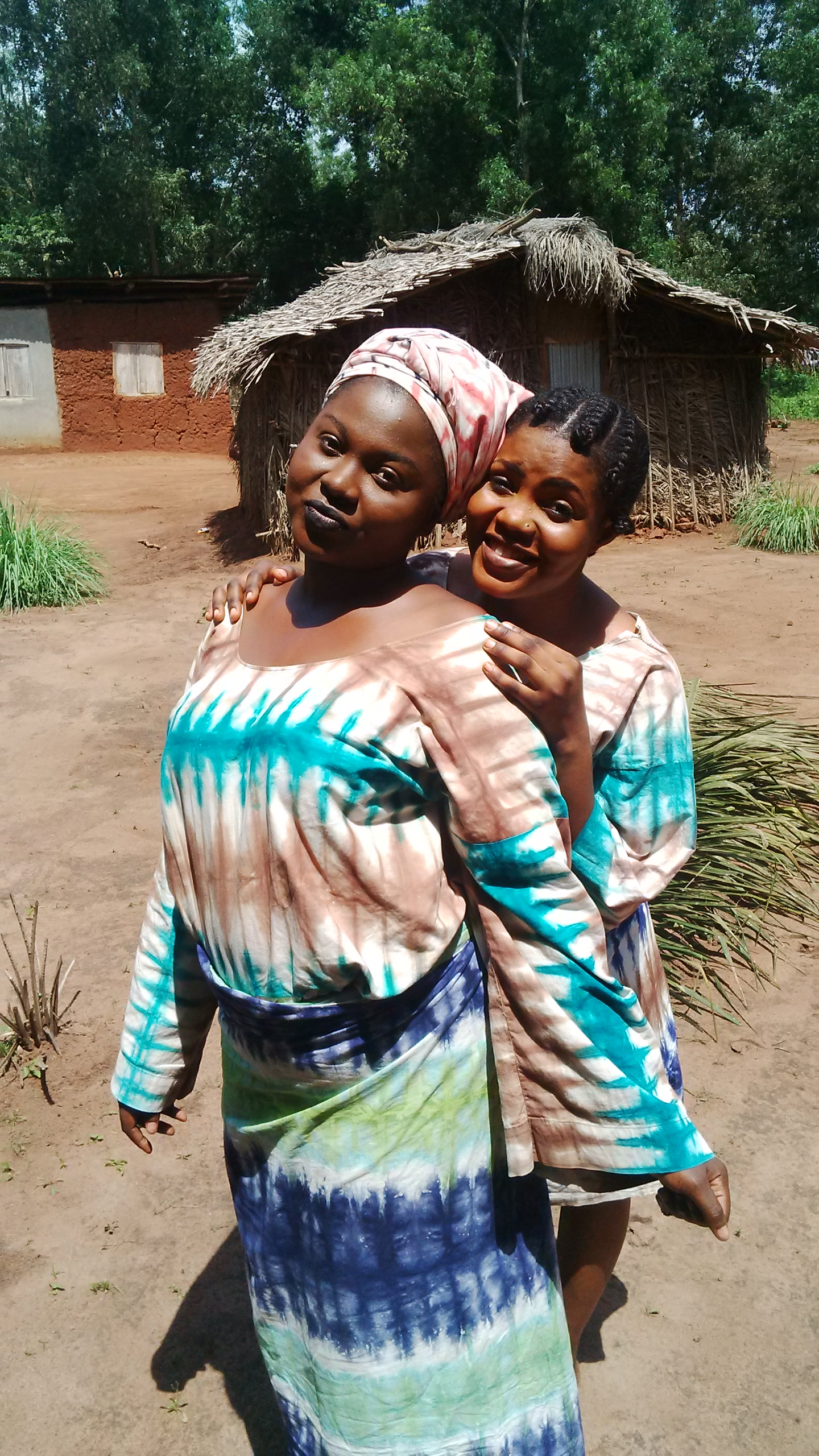
Yoruba women wearing adire clothing on historical set

However, by the end of the 1930s the spread of synthetic indigo, caustic soda, and an influx of new less skilled entrants caused quality problems and a still-present collapse in demand. Though the more complex and beautiful starch resist designs continued to be produced until the early 1970s, and despite a revival prompted largely by the interest of US Peace Corps workers in the 1960s, they never regained their earlier popularity. As of now, simplified stenciled designs and some better quality oniko and alabere designs are still produced, but local taste favours "kampala" (multi-coloured wax-resist cloth, sometimes considered as adire). However, there has been a recent revival of the Adire art by Nigerian professionals in the diaspora such as Dr Toyosi Craig, an innovator and energy expert, and Nigerian artisans like Nike Davies-Okundaye, who inspire younger designers ilike Amaka Osakwe (with her label Maki-Oh). Political figures and celebrities such as Michelle Obama and Lupita Nyong'o have worn adire-inspired clothes recently. Also, Bamidele Abiodun, the wife of the governor of Ogun State, launched Adire Market Week in 2022 as an initiative meant to promote adire and protect local textile manufacturers.

== Techniques ==
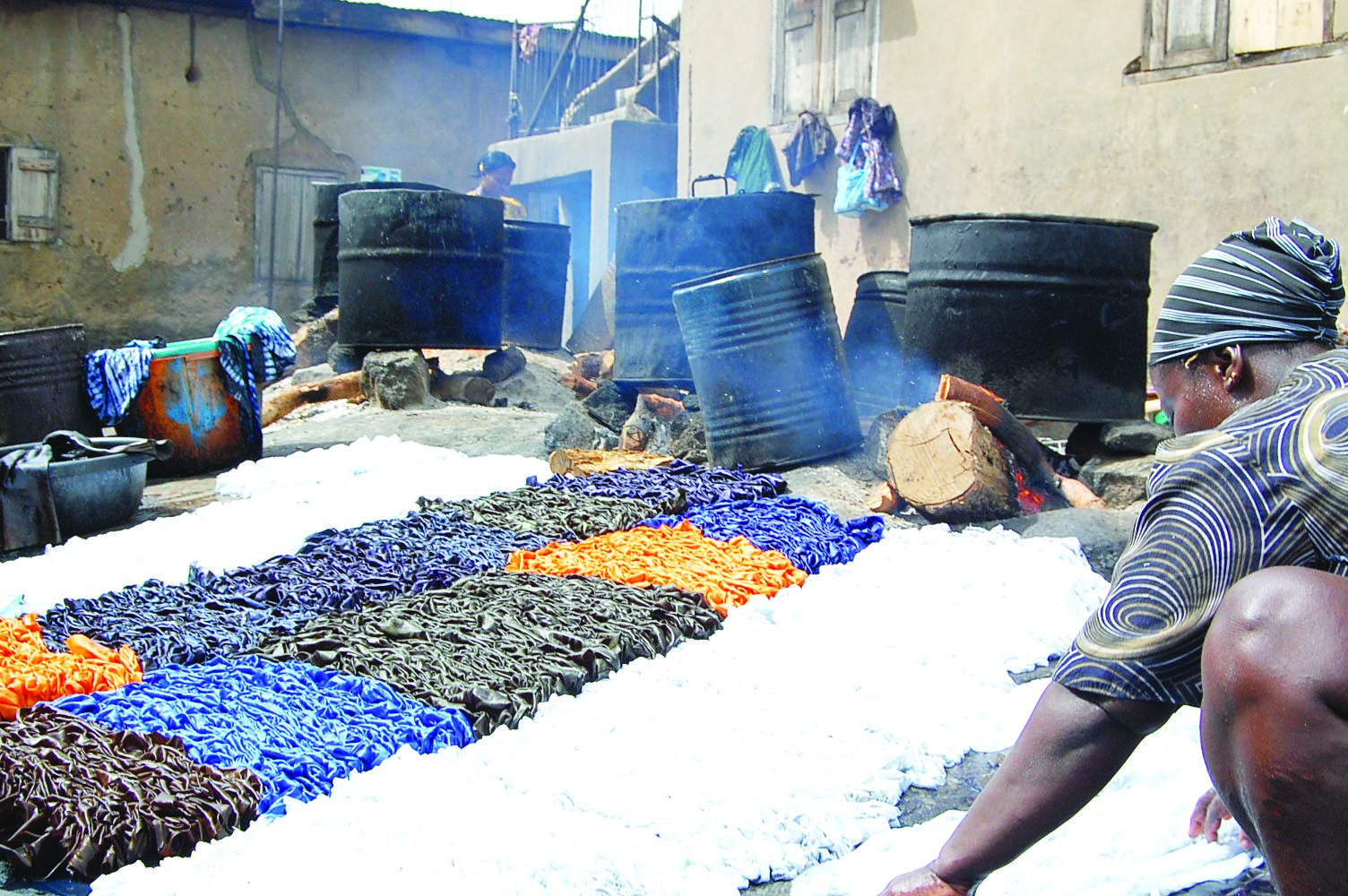
A woman dyeing cotton

Today, there are three primary resist techniques used in Nigeria:

- Oniko: this process involves tying raffia around hundreds of individual corn kernels or pebbles to produce small white circles on a blue background. The fabric can also be twisted and tied on itself or folded into stripes.
- Alabere: Stitching raffia onto the fabric in a pattern prior to dyeing. The raffia palm is stripped, and the spine sewn into the fabric. After dyeing the raffia is usually ripped out, although some choose to leave it in and let wear and tear on the garment slowly reveal the design.
- Eleko: Resist dyeing with cassava paste painted onto the fabric. Traditionally done with different size chicken feathers, calabash carved into different designs are also used, in a manner similar to block printing. Since the early twentieth century, metal stencils cut from the sheets of tin that lined tea chests have also been used.

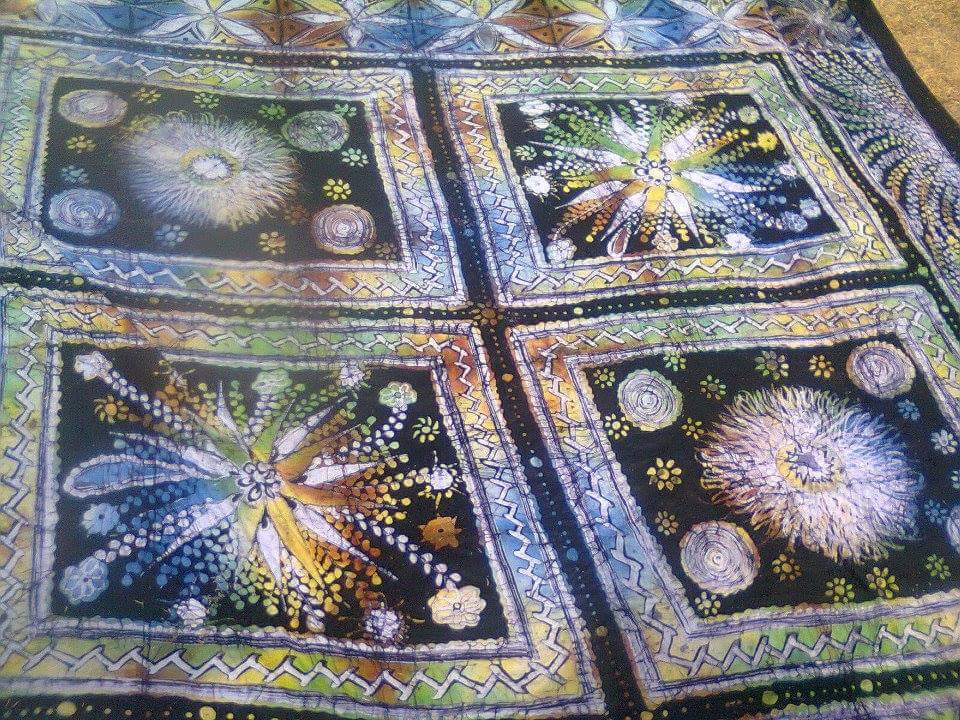
Adire Oniko

Most of the designs are named, with popular ones including the jubilee pattern (first produced for the silver jubilee of George V and Queen Mary in 1935), Olokun ("goddess of the sea"), Sunbebe ("lifting up of the beads") and Ibadandun ('Ibadan is sweet').

Nigeria is also known for its two-tone indigo resist designs, created by repeat dyeing of cloth painted with cassava root paste to create a deep blue; the paste is then washed out and the cloth dyed a final time. Quality cloth is dyed 25 or more times to create a deep blue-black color before the paste is washed out. Additional forms of indigo resist-dyeing exist in other parts of West Africa; for example, the Bamana of Mali use mud resist, while Senegalese dyers use rice paste rather than cassava root, and the Ndop of Cameroon use both stitch resist and wax resist.

== See also ==
- Adire Symbols
- Aso oke
- Pakaja
- Aso Olona
