= International School Ibadan =

Coordinates: 7°26′30″N 3°54′00″E

The International School, Ibadan
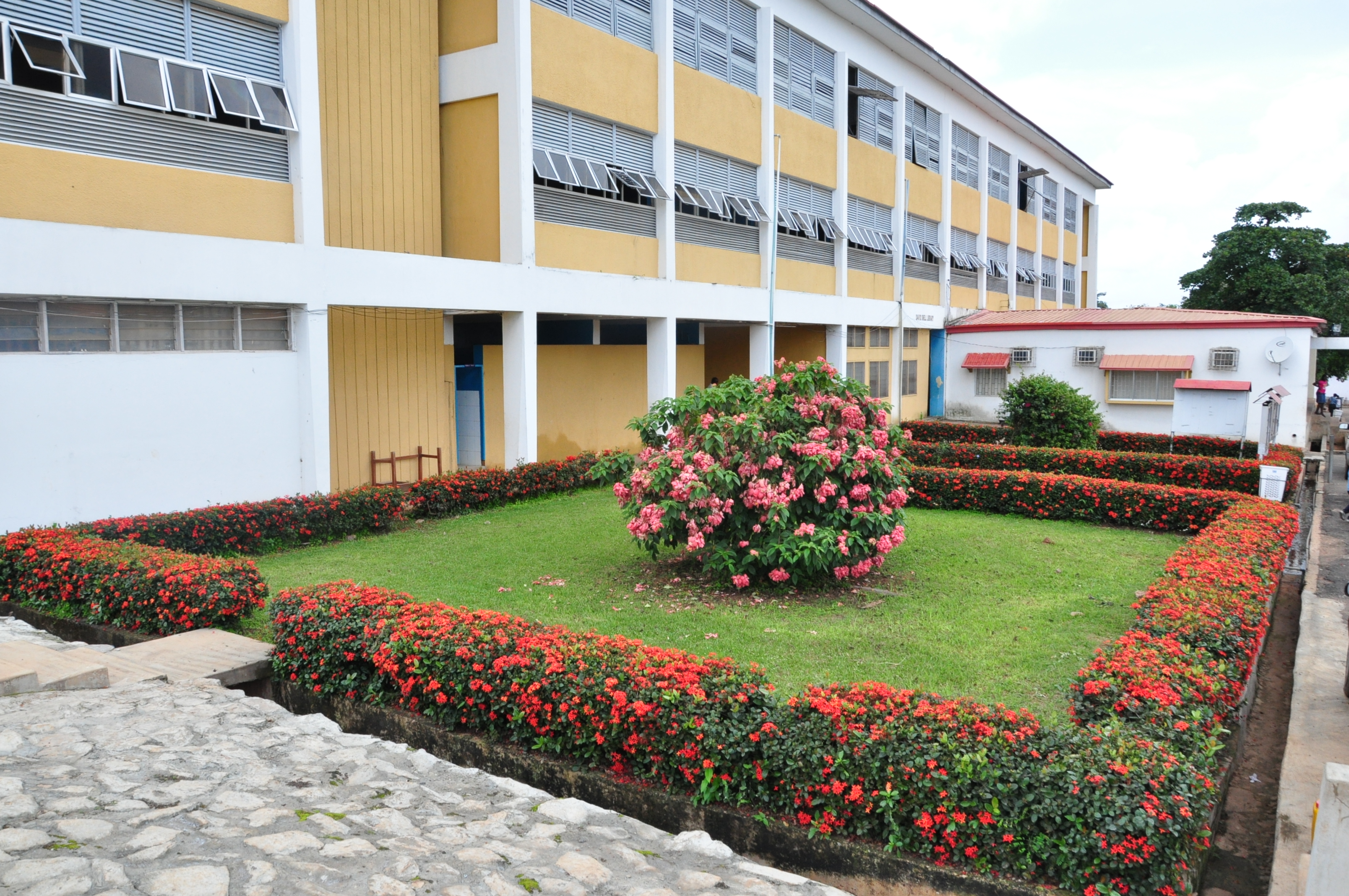
- ISI Main Block

Location
- Barth Road; Ibadan, Oyo State; Nigeria

Information
- School type: Secondary, Day & Boarding
- Motto: Integrity and Service
- Established: 1963
- Founder: Kurt Hahn
- Principal: Akintunde Y.
- Staff: 148
- Age: 10 to 19
- Classes: JS1 - SS3 & Advanced Level Classes
- Average class size: 35
- Education system: 6-3-3-4; UK National Curriculum
- Language: English
- Hours in school day: 8:00 a.m. – 2: 50 p.m.
- Classrooms: 48
- Campus type: Urban
- Houses: Benue, Ogun, Niger, Gongola, Osun
- Colors: White, blue & black
- Sports: basketball, track and field, football, volleyball
- Publication: The Microcosm
- Yearbook: Yes
- Graduates: Ex-ISI
- Website: isi.ui.edu.ng

The International School Ibadan (ISI) is located on the Campus of the University of Ibadan, Nigeria's oldest university.

== History ==
The school was founded by German-British educator Kurt Hahn on 13 October 1963 with funding received from the USAID, Ford Foundation and donation of land by the Nigerian Western Regional government. Most of the founding teaching staff were British expatriate educators from Gordonstoun in Scotland, which had also been founded by Hahn.

The school is a co-educational boarding and day School admitting pupils aged 10 to 16. It was primarily established for children of expatriates living and working in Nigeria. It opened its doors to children of expatriates of diverse nationalities, and highly placed Nigerians.

The first Principal was David S. Snell (1963–1965), followed by John Gillespie(1965–1968). The longest-serving principal was Anglican clergyman Archdeacon J.A. Iluyomade (1969–1985). He was also the first indigenous head of the school. After him was Rev. (Dr.) Dapo Ajayi (1986–1988), then Dapo Fajembola (1990 –1991). Thereafter came the first female principal, Esther Adetola Smith (1991–2004). After her was R.O. Akintilebo (2006–2007), Dr. Mark Brai Malik (2007–2017), Phebean O. Olowe (2017–2022), Akintunde Yinka (since 2022)

ISI runs social and extra-curricular activities such as the biannual international soiree, an evening where all the nationalities represented among staff and students display the food, clothing and other material aspects of culture for sale to raise money for the less-privileged, and the Charity walk.

Academically, it originally followed the British system of five years to preparation for Ordinary Level (General Certificate of Education) and West African School Certificate Examinations, with another two years in the sixth form to prepare for Advanced level (General Certificate of Education) and Higher School Certificate examinations. As a result of the introduction of the 6-3-3-4 Nigerian educational system introduced in the late eighties, it runs the mandatory six years of secondary school education, in addition to preparing students for international exams like the annual IGCSE 'O' Levels and Cambridge 'A' level exams. For many years, it has offered preparation for the International Baccalaureate.

Although it now follows the 6-3-3-4 system of Nigerian education, many of the students continue to prepare for international examinations. Dr. M.B. Malik worked assiduously as principal towards the resuscitation of the Cambridge 'A' Level programme in September 2011, which continues.

The School celebrated its golden jubilee in October 2013.

== Alumni ==
ISI has produced notable alumni including

- Bamidele Abiodun, (First Lady of Ogun State)
- Oluwatoyin Asojo (American scientist)
- Bolanle Austen-Peters (Nigerian businesswoman)
- Wendy Beetlestone (US District Judge)
- Femi Emiola (American actress)
- Olukorede Adenowo (Nigerian banker)
- Akin Fayomi, (Nigerian diplomat)
- Toby Foyeh (British musician)
- Efa Iwara, (Nigerian actor)
- Funmi Iyanda (Nigerian television personality)
- Omobola Johnson (Nigerian former Communications Minister)
- Karen King-Aribisala, (Novelist and Associate Professor of English at University of Lagos)
- Desmond Majekodunmi, (Nigerian environmentalist)
- Tolu Ogunlesi, (Nigerian journalist)
- Ngozi Okonjo-Iweala (Director General of the World Trade Organization and former Nigerian Finance Minister)
- Ifedayo Olarinde (Freeze of Cool FM, multi-award winning OAP)
- Yewande Olubummo, (American Mathematics Professor)
- Olayinka Omigbodun (Nigerian physician and academic)
- Dolapo Osinbajo (Former Second Lady of Nigeria)
- Sasha P; (Nigerian rapper and Olympic torch bearer)
- Helen Prest-Ajayi (Miss Nigeria 1979)
- Joshua Uzoigwe (Nigerian musicologist)

== See also ==
- Kenneth Dike
- Samuel Tunde Bajah
