= Yetunde =

- Gender: Female
- Language: Yoruba

Origin
- Meaning: Mother Returns, or Mother has Returned

Other names
- Variant forms: Yewande; Yejide; Yeside; Yetide; Yetunji; Yebode; Iyabo/Iyabode
- See also: Babatunde; male names: Babatunde, Babawande, Babajide

Yetunde // is a traditional name of the Yoruba ethnic group for females which factors into Yoruba religious beliefs, meaning "Mother has returned". This is the name the Yoruba give to a daughter born shortly after the death of a paternal grandmother. In essence, the baby is regarded in Yoruba society and worldview as the reincarnation of their grandmother. In similarity, Babatunde (father again come) and Babajide (father wake come) are the male equivalent.

== Spelling variations ==
Iyabo, Iyamide, Yetunde, Yedjide, or Yewande, meaning "Mother has returned".

== Notable people with the name include ==
- Anthonia Yetunde Alabi, Nigerian musician and businesswoman.
- Pamela Ayo Yetunde, American Buddhist pastoral counselor, hospice worker, writer and educator
- Yetunde Barnabas, Nigerian actress
- Yetunde Onanuga, Nigerian politician
- Yetunde Price, the elder half-sister of tennis players Venus Williams and Serena Williams.
- Yetide Badaki, American actress
- Yejide Kilanko, Nigerian-Canadian writer
- Agnes Yewande Savage, Scottish-Nigerian physician
- Yewande Osho, British comedian and actress.
- Yewande Adekoya, Nigerian actress.
- Yewande Akinola, Nigerian engineer
- Yewande Olubummo, American scientist
- Yewande Komolafe, American chef

Notable people with the alternative name form include:

- Iyabo Obasanjo-Bello, daughter of Nigerian former president.
- Iyabo Anisulowo, Nigerian politician
- Iyabo Ojo, Nigerian actress.
- Olufunke Iyabo Osibodu, Nigerian banker
- Iyabode Ololade Remilekun Wallinkoski, Finnish model.
- Comfort Iyabo Momoh British-Nigerian nurse/midwife.

== See also ==
- Babatunde
- Tunde
