= Osakwe =

- Gender: Male
- Language(s): Igbo

Origin
- Word/name: Nigeria
- Meaning: God agrees

Osakwe is a surname. Notable people with the surname include:

- Ada Osakwe (born 1981), Nigerian economist, entrepreneur, and corporate executive
- Amaka Osakwe (born 1987), Nigerian fashion designer
- Patrick Osakwe (born 1948), Nigerian politician
