= Daddy Freeze =

Nigerian broadcaster and radio talk show host (born 1976)

- Born: Ifedayo Olarinde; 6 May 1976 (age 50); Cluj-Napoca, Romania
- Education: University of Ibadan
- Occupations: Broadcaster, media personality
- Years active: 1996–present
- Spouse: Benedicta Elechi

Ifedayo Olarinde (born 6 May 1976), popularly known as Daddy Freeze, is a Nigerian-Romanian broadcaster and radio talk show host. His well-known accomplishments include anchoring Cool FM Nigeria and starting the Free Nation Church, an online ministry.

== Early life ==
Ifedayo Olarinde was born in Cluj-Napoca, Romania, to a Nigerian father and a Romanian mother. He spent most of his early years in Ibadan, where he attended the International School Ibadan. He earned a degree in sociology from the University of Ibadan, and is from Oyan Town, Odo Otin, Osun State.

== Career ==
Freeze commenced his radio career in 1996 with the Broadcasting Corporation of Oyo State (BCOS), where he served as a correspondent on The World Chart Show. He joined Cool FM in 2001 and worked in radio presenting, television, and general entertainment. He later became a senior broadcaster at the Cool FM station in Lagos.

Freeze is also an event compere and has hosted a number of musical concerts, comedy shows, and Nollywood premieres in Nigeria, Ghana, and the United Kingdom. He is the leader of the #FreeTheSheeple Movement. In 2017, he started the Free Nation Church, an online ministry that holds Sunday and weekday services.

In 2020, Freeze announced his departure from Cool FM, where he had worked for over 20 years. In June 2025, The Honest Bunch podcast announced him as their new host after Nedu Wazobia's departure.

== Controversy involving David Oyedepo ==
In 2018, Freeze ridiculed pastor David Oyedepo for allegedly lying, chastised him for cursing Fulani herders, and accused him of underpaying his staff. Consequently, he had faced criticism from a number of respectable clerics, such as David Ibiyeomie and Paul Enenche. On 12 September 2020, Freeze expressed regret to Oyedepo.

== Accolades ==
- 2011 Nigerian Broadcasters Merit Awards – Most Popular Radio Presenter
- 2012 Mode Men Awards – Radio Personality of the Year
- 2013 Nigeria Entertainment Awards – Best Radio/TV Personality
- 2014 Nickelodeon Kids' Choice Awards – Favourite Nigerian On-Air Personality
- 2023 Social Media Awards - Most engaging on-air personality on social media
