= Hussey College Warri =

High school in Nigeria

Hussey College
- Warri, Delta State; Nigeria

Information
- Type: Public
- Motto: Citizenship and Education, Labour and Unity
- Established: 3 February 1947
- Principal: MACK4PF
- Enrollment: Approx 3000
- Campus: Upper Erejuwa
- Colors: Ash Blue and White
- Nickname: Hussians
- Website: http://www.husseycollegewosa.org/

Hussey College Warri is a secondary school located along Upper Erejuwa Road in Warri, Delta State, Nigeria. It is one of the oldest and most prestigious colleges in Delta State and Nigeria, having produced many notable figures in the Nigerian professional and political scenery. The school has literally raised several generations of Nigerians from all tribes and backgrounds and schooled them in the best tradition of scholarship, athleticism, citizenship and morality. The 60th anniversary celebration (Diamond Jubilee) of the foundation of Hussey College, Warri was organised by the Old Students Association in 2007.

Hussey College was named after Eric Robert James Hussey, the first British Director of Education in Nigeria and one time Olympic games competitor, he competed in the 1908 Summer Olympics.

Hussey College started as only boys' secondary school (single-sex education) at inception in 1947. It became a mixed secondary school – boys and girls – (coeducation) in 1960 when the first set of girls were admitted. The school was reverted to only boys' school in the early 2000s by the Delta State Government and was renamed "Hussey Boys Model College".

== History ==
Hussey College was founded on 3 February 1947 as the first college in Warri by three Itsekiri personalities, Chief Ogbemi Newe Rewane, the late Ologbotsere of Warri, his brother Alfred Rewane and Chief Elliot Nekapenami Andrew Begho, the late Iserigho of Warri kingdom. Their aim was to establish a secondary school that would offer qualitative education to young men and women in Warri and beyond - Nigeria.

The motive of the founding fathers was to redress the vacuum situation following the relocation of Warri College, the then Government Secondary School in the city to Ughelli as Government College, Ughelli in 1946 and the founding of Urhobo College in Effurun (outskirt of Warri) by Urhobo Progressive Union (UPU) in 1946. It became pertinent and urgent for the need of a secondary to be sited in Warri to fill in the vacuum. Chief O. N Rewane and Begho filled this vacuum with the founding of Hussey College in Warri through private entrepreneurship.

The idea to establish a school was first mooted in 1935 by both men, then barely in their twenties, at the Government College, Ibadan where they were students. Rewane and Begho along with Mr V. A. Savages (B.A. Hons) did the spade work to ensure that the school became reality. At inception Rewane was treasurer, Begho the manager and Savage, the pioneer principal. They were educationists per excellence.

Hussey College Warri, from inception became cosmopolitan with students' intake across the length and breadth of Nigeria. It was a college of both academic and athletic excellence and the breeding ground of future leaders in various department of national life. Hussey College has established itself as the most distinguish and credible secondary school in Warri and Nigeria in general.

== School Houses ==
Formerly, before the conversion of Hussey College into Hussey Boys Model College (only boys' school), Hussey College used to have seven competitive houses: four boys' houses and three girls' houses.

The boys' houses were:

- Dore (red)
- Ikoli (yellow)
- Nana (green)
- Seville Dawes (blue)

While the girls' houses were:

- Ejimogho (yellow)
- Iye (red)
- Otsowode (blue)

The boys' houses competed among fellow boys' houses while the girls' houses also competed among fellow girls' houses. Unlike in other mixed schools where boys and girls share the same house name, Hussey College operated unisex houses. These houses competed for medals, laurels and points in the school annual inter-house sports (Hussey College Annual Inter-House Sports Competition) which pulled huge crowd from all over Warri and beyond – especially the invitation relay events, which was a delight to watch and highly talked about in town, usually added glamour to the inter-house sports.

During the school annual inter-house sports competition, Seville Dawes House often had the upper hand among the male houses, with its arch-rival being Dore House. However, in some years, dark horse like Ikoli House usually acted as giant killer to come first. And the minnow Nana House (with mother-luck on their side) usually pulled surprises in their rare few lucky years too.

While Otsowode House dominated the female houses, with her bitter arch-rival being Iye House, but in some years, Ejimogho - especially years she had elite talented athletes - usually bamboozled her way to clinch first spot.

While the rivalry between Seville Dawes and Dore – and other male houses – was mere healthy competition left behind on the athletic field, the rivalry between Otsowode and Iye – in extension Ejimogho – was bitter and often carried over to the classrooms.

== Principals ==
The former principals and teachers of Hussey college were part the team that nurtured the institution into a centre of excellence. A bronze scroll containing the names of pioneer principals and early teachers as a tribute to theircontributions was unveiled during the 60th anniversary celebration of the school.

- Mr. V. A. Savages (B.A. Hons) - The pioneer principal.
- Eng. R. S. Mckenzie - The second principal.
- Mr. G.C. Pillai - Principal (1963–1965) appointed by Chief O.N. Rewane, Chemistry teacher (1961–1963)
- Chief E. A. Adeyemo - The first indigenous principal.
- Justice F. O. Awogu, Phd
- Mr. Amata
- Mr. Afam Mordi
- Mr. Igodan
- Mr. Godwin P. Alufohai
- Chief Michael Ojeifo Ojo – A popular principal in the 1980s.
- M. A. Usiomoifo - A principal in the late 1980s to early 1990s (1988–1991), was transferred to Edo State immediately after the creation of Delta State in 1991.
- Dr. Joseph Anidu Egenege - A principal in the early 1990s immediately after the creation of Delta State from Bendel State, later Associate Professor of Health Education, Dept of Public and Community Health, Novena University, Ogume, Delta State, Nigeria.
- Mr. J. M. Edah
- Mr. Ikimi
- Rev. T. U. Aliagba
- Mrs. Omabegho
- Mr. Peter Okotie
- Mr. Hendrix O. O. Ajuyah
- Chuks

== Notable teachers ==
- Dr. Alex Ekwueme - Former vice president of Nigeria who was Physics Master between 1950 and 1952.
- Justice Victor Ovie Whisky - A jurist who served as a Chief Judge of the Benin High Court in the late 1970s and later as the chairman of the Federal Electoral Commission (FEDECO) from 1980–1983.
- Abel Guobadia - Former Independent National Electoral Commission (INEC) Chairman, Commissioner for Education and later Commissioner for Finance in the former Bendel State (now Edo and Delta) between 1979 and 1983.

== Notable alumni ==
=== Politics, Law and Government ===
- Brigadier Bassey Asuquo - Former Military Governor of Delta and Edo states.
- Navy Commander Temi Ejoor - Former military Administrator of Enugu and Abia States.
- Brigadier General Mobolaji Johnson - Former Military Governor of Lagos State attended Hussey College from 1952 to 1954.
- Brigadier General Sunday Tuoyo (rtd.) - Former Military Governor of old Ondo State.
- Hon Justice Alfred Eyewumi Awala (JCA). Justice of the Federal Court of Appeal

=== Military Personnel ===
- Major Isaac Jasper Adaka Boro - Scientist, academic, administrator, soldier to the core and Niger Delta Nationalist. He attended Hussey College, passed the West African School Certificate Examinations in 1957 and produced the best school certificate result for the college in that year.

=== Academia ===
- Professor Samuel Tunde Bajah - Renowned chemistry teacher, lecturer and also a former teacher at Hussey College. He attended Hussey College between 1949 and 1954, and was in the school's athletic team that won the Grier Cup in 1954.

=== Sports Personalities ===
Hussey College almost from inception became a centre for sporting excellence, raising great sportsmen and women who represented Nigeria at international meets and competitions.

- Clement Temile - Who was a member of the nation's football team, the Green Eagles.
- Thompson Usiyan - Who was a member of the nation's football team, the Green Eagles.

=== Entertainment ===
- Carter Efe, online streamer and comedian
