= Tunde =

- Gender: Unisex
- Language: Yoruba

Origin
- Origin: Nigeria
- Meaning: returns
- Region of origin: South western Nigerian

Tunde audio is a unisex name, originally a diminutive form of a Yoruba name for a native of Nigeria which also means "returns". Hence, when Tunde is combined with other Yoruba words such as Baba (father) or Yeye/Iya/Mama (mother) to form Babatunde and Yetunde respectively, the meaning becomes 'father or mother has returned'. Similarly, Omo (son) or Ola (wealth) can be added to Tunde.

Notable persons with the name Tunde include:

- Tunde Adebimpe (born 1975), American actor, director and musician
- Tunde Adisa, Nigerian para table tennis player
- Tunde Baiyewu (born 1965), British-Nigerian singer
- Tunde Enahoro (born 1990), Nigerian former footballer
- Tunde Idiagbon (1942–1999), Nigerian soldier
- Tunde Jegede (born 1972), Nigerian composer and musician
- Tunde Nightingale (1922–1981), Nigerian musician

== See also ==
- Babatunde
- Yetunde
- Tünde, Hungarian female given name
