= Adire Symbols =

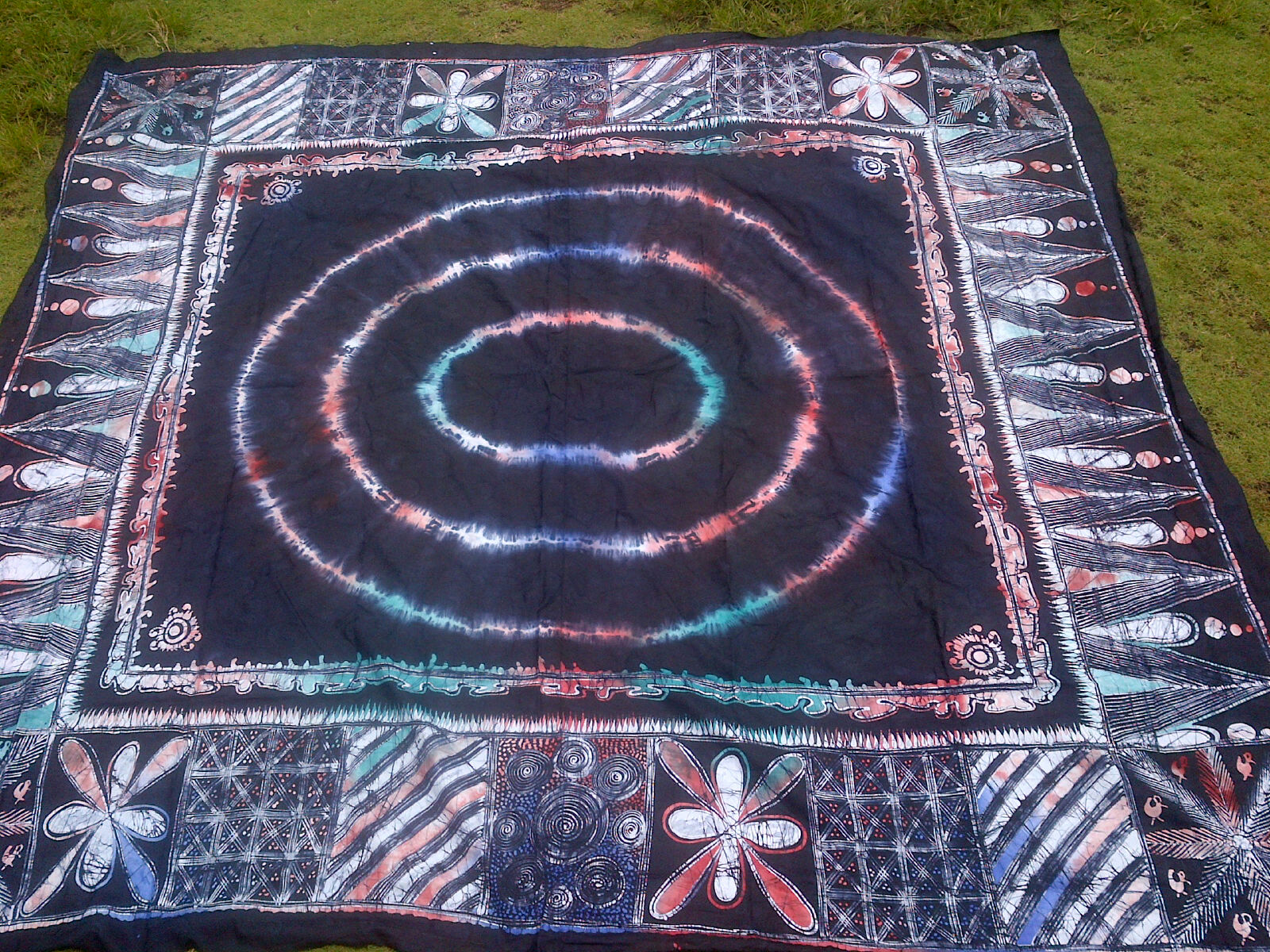
Adire with symbolic motifs

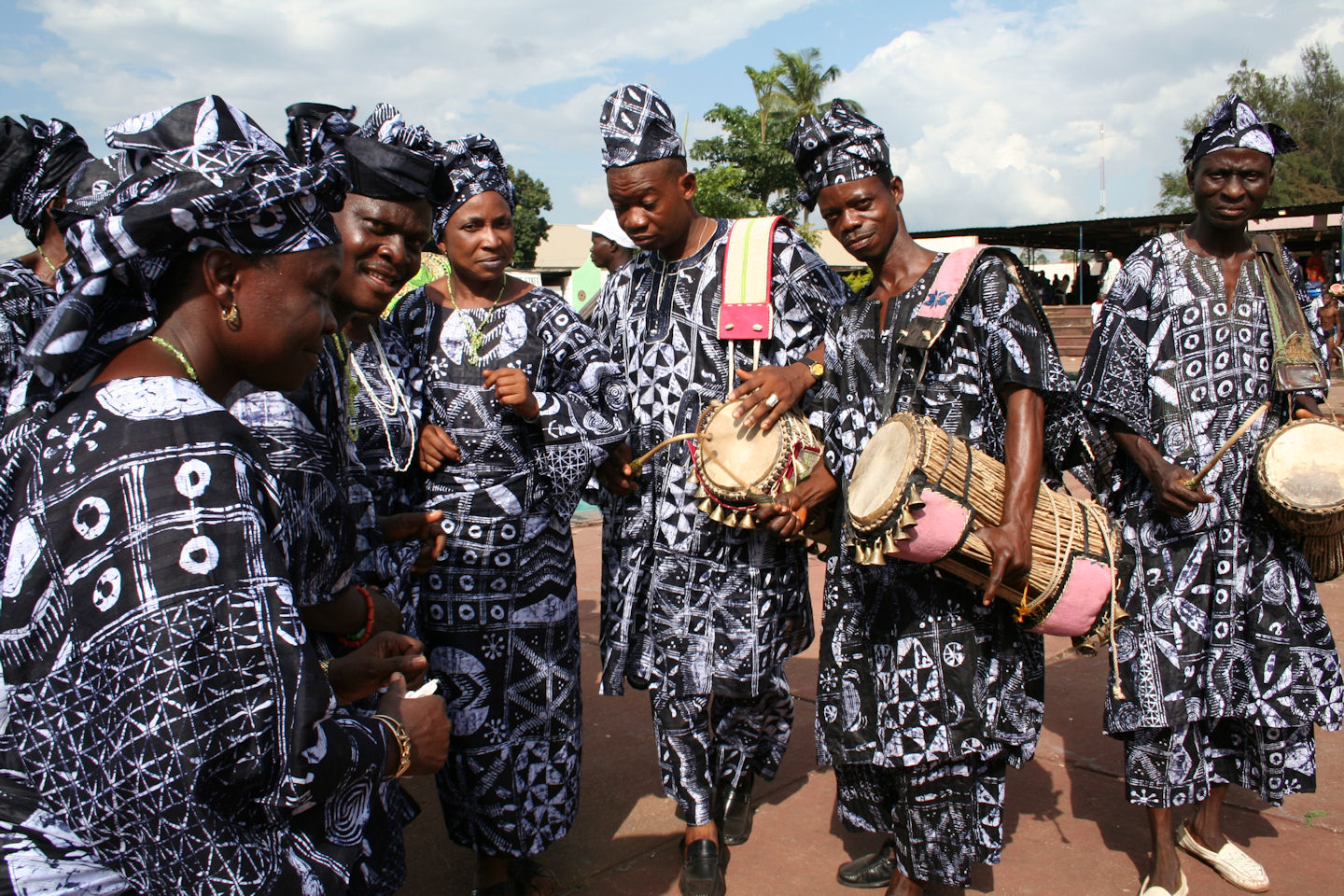
Some Adire symbols

Adire symbols are the symbols traditionally made on Adire, a traditional Yoruba tie-dye fabric. The pictograms or pictographs on the indigo-dyed fabric represent proverbs, nature, and aspirations. The Adire symbols include: Ododo (flower), Olokun (wealth), Igi Iye (life tree) – symbolizing growth, Kọkọrọ (key), Sunbebe (royal beads), Ejo (snake) – symbolizing transformation, Odan (fig tree) – symbolizing life, Owo (cowries) – symbolizing wealth/money, and Dundun/Gangan (talking drums) – symbolizing festivity. These motifs, which usually vary from geometric shapes to animals and plants, convey relevant meaning from the Adire maker.

== Adire symbols, motifs and their meanings ==
Adire symbols include a list of motifs and patters that contain deeper meaning or objects that appear in the everyday lives of Yoruba people, to which certain beliefs, thematic interpretations and semiotic expressions are attached. The patterns can be categorized into; geometric, figural, and letter patterns, while the motifs can be; floral, animal/fauna, object and abstract. The motifs bear names, and are trans-generational, and are usually passed down within families, although they are not completely static.

=== List of objects ===
- Opon Ifá – Divination tray
- Yẹti – Earring; You'll only hear good news around you
- Ilẹkẹ Bebe – Waist beads
- Amuga – Fork
- Owo ẹyọ – Cowrie shells; Represents wealth and prosperity.
- Ṣẹkẹrẹ – Gourd rattle
- Akẹtẹ – Wide brimmed hat
- Aago Ọwọ – Watch
- Ade – Crown
- Ọpa – Staff; Longevity, balance
- Ewe Ẹgẹ/Paki/Gbaguda – Cassava leaves; Resources. Every part of the cassava is useful, don't be lazy, make use of resources.
- Ọka Bàbà – Guinea corn; The hand that gives/feeds you will never lack.
- Agbòòrùn – Umbrella; Represents shade and protection.

=== List of symbols and patterns ===
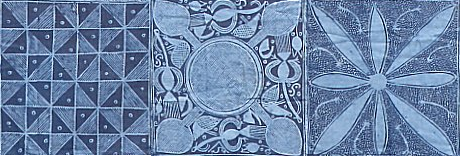
Adirẹ Ẹlẹkọ with Ojú ara, Amuga (middle) and Ewe ẹgẹ (right)

- Orita – Crossroads; Crossroads of life.
- Olokun – Deity of the sea; Prosperity, Mystery, its swirling pattern reminds wearers to embrace dynamism like water.
- Ọmọnile – Wall gecko; A peaceful home, a stable home.
- Ilu Gangan (Checkered squares split into dark and light triangles) – Talking drum; An eventful life, Festivity
- Ejo ati ẹyẹ – A snake and a bird on a tree; The enemies in your own home will not hurt you openly.
- Digi – Mirror/Diagonal hatch; Self reflection, reflection of life, someone who is a reflection in your life.
- Olókòtó – Concentric spirals; The cycle of life, going through the natural stages of life, we start small but grow bigger.
- Orita mẹta – Three way crossroads; Your journey may be difficult, but you will eventually get there.
- Ìyẹ – Feathers; Anywhere you wish to be, you'll get there fast.
- Iṣan òkun – Waves: Wave away any troubles; vastness; depth and continuity.
- Pẹpẹyẹ – Four ducks with converging beaks; Ducks eat stone but will excrete water, all the schemings of your enemies will avail to nothing.
- Agbolé – Homestead/Concentric rectangles with a central circle; The family home. When a family lives together, their bond is stronger, you don't leave fire burning on a roof and go to sleep.
- Ṣẹkẹrẹ pẹlu Owo ẹyọ – Gourd with cowry shells and lines; Gourd rattles need not be beaten with a stick, do not expend energy on unnecessary things.
- Ogbó/Atọ – Concentric squares; Long life, the blessings of longevity and prosperity.
- Orokun Arọ – Lame knee; A foretold battle will not kill a wise handicap, be proactive about your insufficiencies. Don't let your disabilities deter you.
- Òkòtó – Spiralling circles; Every stage in life is short.
- Dùndún (A square divided into 8 triangles) – Talking drum – Celebration and joy, an eventful life.
- Agẹmọ/Ọ̀ga – Chameleon; Adaptability and escape from difficult situations.
- Awẹ Igba – Calabash halves with squares in the middle – Life is sweet, but money makes it sweeter.
- Òpó ilé/Opomulero – Pillars/Cornerstone; Strength and support, also that which you struggle to get lasts longer in your hands.
- Egungun Ẹja – Fish bones; Don't bite off more than you can chew.
- Adé – Crown (triangular pattern); There is no king without a crown; a wealthy woman is the crown of her husband.
- Alangba bẹrẹkẹtẹ – Fat lizard; A family/home that is well fed/taken care of. The lizard's big stomach is a symbol of wealth.
- Ojú ìdí/Ara – Central tray with four spoons/ladles; Only a woman can reveal the true father of her children.
- Ọkọ̀ pẹlu Ẹrù – A canoe with a circular luggage in middle; Two men quarrelling will not sit on the same side in a boat and will not work together; Settle your differences and grow together.

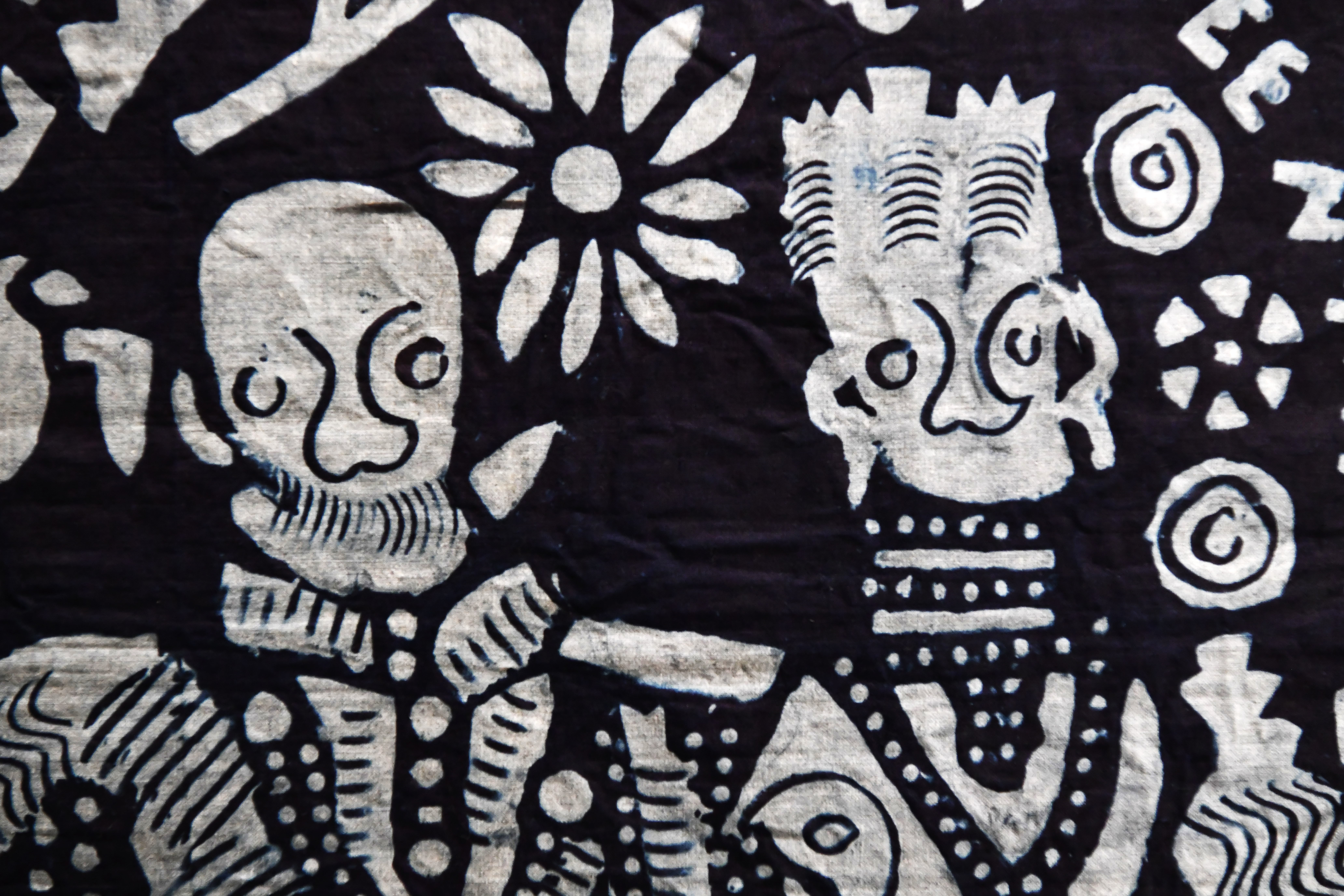
Adire Eleko of George V and Queen Mary with Adire symbols

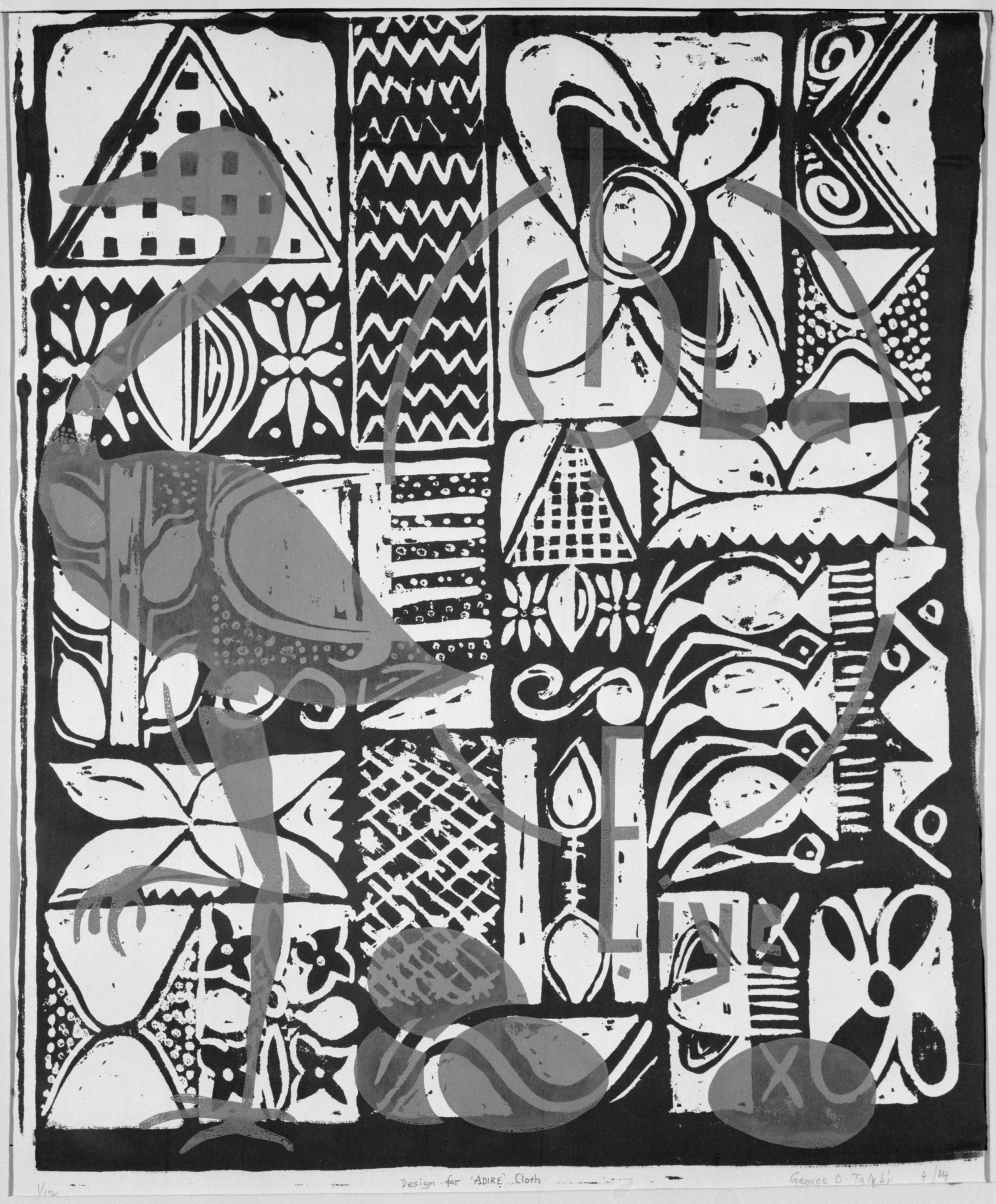
Adire symbols designs

== Bibliography ==
- Yamamoto, Sakae (20 July 2015). Human Interface and the Management of Information. Information and Knowledge Design: 17th International Conference, HCI International 2015, Los Angeles, CA, USA, August 2-7, 2015, Proceedings, Part I. Springer. p. 218. ISBN 978-3-319-20612-7.
