= Helen Prest-Ajayi =

Nigerian lawyer and writer (born 1959)

- Born: 17 September 1959 (age 66)
- Education: International School Ibadan; Obafemi Awolowo University; King's College London
- Occupations: lawyer, businesswoman
- Beauty pageant titleholder
- Title: Miss Nigeria 1979

Helen Prest-Ajayi, formerly Prest-Davies, (née Prest, born 17 September 1959) is a Nigerian lawyer, writer and beauty pageant titleholder. Helen was raised in England. She attended the International School Ibadan for her advanced levels and Obafemi Awolowo University for her undergraduate studies in Law prior to her pageantry. After she was crowned Miss Nigeria at the age of 19 in 1979, she represented Nigeria at the Miss World 1979 pageant and furthered her education at King's College London, earning an LLM. She was also active as a columnist in the 1990s. She is currently the CEO of Media Business Company. She is the granddaughter of the Nigerian founding father Chief Arthur Prest and daughter of politician Chief Michael Godwin Prest. She has three daughters. She married her first husband businessman Jimmy Davies in 1988.

== Personal life ==
Helen Prest stopped practising law due to health issues and became a writer and has authored many books which include "The Complete English Guide". She was bereaved of her partner Dr Tosin Ajayi on 26 April 2020.
