= Akin Fayomi =

Nigerian career diplomat

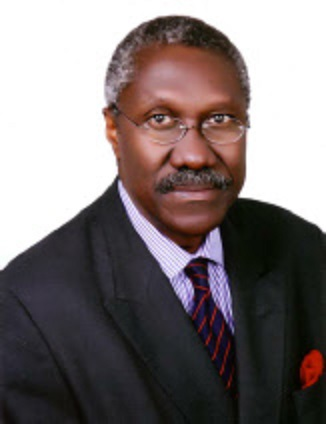

Nigeria Ambassador to France and the Principality of Monaco
- In office July 2012 – December 2013
- President: Goodluck Jonathan

Personal details
- Born: Akinyele Oladipo Fayomi; 8 November 1955 (age 70) Abeokuta, Ogun State, Nigeria
- Education: University of Ibadan and University of Ife
- Profession: Diplomat

Ambassador Akin Fayomi (born 8 November 1955) is a Nigerian career diplomat who was the Minister/Head of Political Affairs at the High Commission of Nigeria, London from July 2004 to March 2007. Later he was Ambassador and Special Representative of the Chairperson of the African Union Commission (SRCC) to Liberia from January 2010 to July 2011. He was then appointed as Under-Secretary in the Ministry of Foreign Affairs from July 2011 to July 2012, before his appointment as The Ambassador of Nigeria to France from July 2012 to December 2013. He was also appointed as the first Nigerian Ambassador to the Principality of Monaco during the same period.

== Early life and education ==
Akinyele O. Fayomi was born in Abeokuta, Nigeria. He attended Loyola College and The International School both in Ibadan for his secondary and higher secondary education. He studied history at the University of Ibadan and received his BA Honours in 1977. He later studied International Relations at the University of Ife and received his Master of Science degree in 1986. He obtained a certificate in "Negotiation and Mediation Skills" in March 2008 from the Legon Centre for International Affairs, University of Ghana.

He started his career in the Foreign Service in 1978.

== Diplomatic career ==
On joining the Nigerian Foreign Service in 1978. He served in the Ministry of Foreign Affairs and Nigerian embassies in Rio de Janeiro, Beijing, Harare, Seoul, London, Monrovia and Paris. He was also in Liberia as the Ambassador & Special Representative of the African Union and retired from the Foreign Service in 2013 after serving as the Nigerian Ambassador to France and the Principality of Monaco.

He is current Chairman of Nigeria's Inter-Ministerial Committee on Darfur (IMCD) since Oct. 2007 and was the Secretary of the Nigerian Delegation to the African Union Summits in Accra, June/July 2007 and Addis Ababa, January/February 2008; Sharm-El Sheikh, June/July 2008 and to the Commonwealth Heads of Government Meetings (CHOGM), in Limassol 1992; Abuja 2003; Valletta 2005; and Perth 2011.

Akin was also present as a member of the Nigerian Delegation to the United Nations General Assembly in New York in 2004, 2005, 2006, 2011 and 2012.

== Personal life ==
Akin is married to Olayinka Fayomi and they have four adult children. He is also a recipient of an honorary chieftaincy title conferred on him by President Ellen Johnson Sirleaf of Liberia. Akin was given the Distinguished Foreign Service Award for his 35-year meritorious service by the Government of Nigeria in December 2014.

Diplomatic posts
Preceded by	Nigerian Ambassador to France; July 2012 – December 2013	Incumbent
