= Olajumoke Adenowo =

Nigerian architect and author

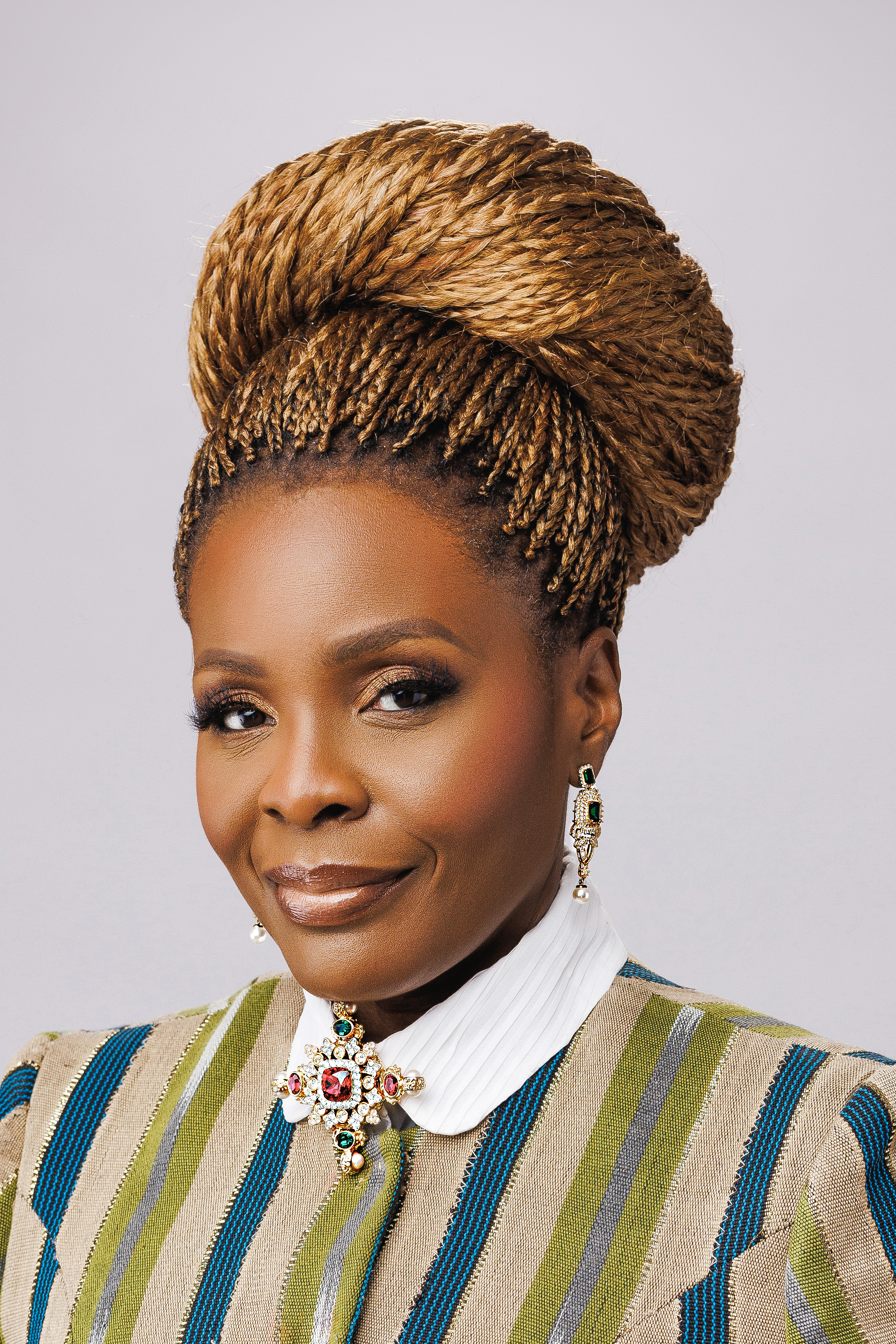
- Born: 16 October 1968 (age 57); Ibadan, Oyo State, Nigeria
- Education: BSc Hons Architecture [1988], Masters in Architecture [1991] at Obafemi Awolowo University, Chief Executive Programme [CEP] Lagos Business School [2002]
- Occupations: Chartered Architect - Principal Architect AD Consulting; Chartered Arbitrator; Founder, Awesome Treasures Foundation; Author, Radio Host / Podcaster Speaker
- Known for: Architecture
- Spouse: Olukorede Adenowo

Olajumoke Olufunmilola Adenowo (born 16 October 1968) is a Nigerian architect and founder of AD Consulting, a boutique architecture and interior design firm established in 1994. She has been recognized in both Nigerian and international media for her contributions to contemporary African architecture.

== Early life and education ==
Adenowo was born in Ibadan, Oyo State, Nigeria, to academic parents—her father taught history and her mother criminology. She lived in the Obafemi Awolowo University campus, between 1962 and 1972.

Living on the campus and trips to Paris and the Palais de Versailles as a young child impressed Adenowo, influencing her decision to study architecture. At 14, she enrolled in Obafemi Awolowo University. She graduated at 19, receiving a Bachelor of Science in Architecture with Honours. She won the prize for Best Student Design as an undergraduate. She continued graduate studies there, earning a Masters Degree in Architecture with distinction in 1991.

Adenowo studied at the Lagos Business School's Chief Executive Programme (2002), the IESE Business School at the University of Navarra in Barcelona, Spain (2005). She also graduated from the Yale School of Management (2016) and the Harvard Kennedy School (2019).

Adenowo’s design philosophy, "NeoHeritage Architecture", leverages on her experiential understanding of heritage design to define contemporary African Architecture of global relevance.

== Architecture ==
After graduating from university, Adenowo was hired as an Assistant Architect at Towry Coker Associates. She then practiced as an architect in Lagos at Femi Majekodunmi Associates. She worked on the Federal Ministry of Finance project in Abuja at the age of 23.

In 1994, at the age of 25, Adenowo founded her boutique architecture and interior design firm, AD Consulting. Since its inception, AD Consulting has been involved in designing and constructing more than 114 projects. These include Institutional buildings, Office Building Complexes, Mixed Use developments, auditoria, private residences, healthcare facilities, industrial campuses and Master plans. AD's clients span national and multi-national clients, including Coca-Cola, L’Oreal, Access Bank plc and Guaranty Trust Bank.

== Professional affiliations ==
- Fellow, Nigerian Institute of Architects.
- Associate Member of the Chartered Institute of Arbitrators.
- Member of the African Leadership Network.
- Vital Voices Lead Fellow.
- Member of the Global Philanthropy Forum.
- Member of African Philanthropy Forum.

== Media ==
Adenowo has been profiled by CNN, which referred to her as "Africa’s Starchitect." In 2018, she was recognized by the Royal Institute of British Architects (RIBA) among notable women in architecture.

== Academia and features in academic publications ==
In 2019, Olajumoke Adenowo was appointed as a visiting professor at the Technische Universitat Munchen (TUM) in Germany. She was honoured as a Laureate and Guest Scientist at the Chair of Theory, History of Architecture and Art & Design arms of the university's Department of Architecture. This programme was established in collaboration with the Bavarian Ministry of Education.

Her Monograph “Neo Heritage; Defining Contemporary African Architecture“ is the first work by a black Architect to be published by Rizzoli, the leading Art, Architecture and Design Publisher.

== Other business endeavors ==
In parallel to founding AD Consulting, Adenowo also founded and ran Advantage Energy, an oil and gas services firm.

== Public speaking ==
Recognized as a thought leader on Architecture, the Arts, leadership, Youth and Women’s Empowerment, she regularly speaks at international summits and conferences. She has spoken at the McKenzie Executive leadership platform, Harvard Business School (African Business Club). SOLVE at MIT, Haust Der Kunst (Munich), the Institute of Directors, the Global Women’s Forum, Cambridge University African Society and many other platforms.

Since 2011 she has hosted a syndicated radio show and podcast on leadership; "Voice of Change". She has been featured by international media outlets such as CNN and Fortune.

== Service on boards, corporate bodies, and social initiatives ==
- Dezeen Awards - Judge 2025.
- Cartier Women's Initiative Awards - Jury Member - 2018.
- Vocational Training and Professional Development Academy (VPDA), Director - 2018
- British School of Lome, Member Board of Governors - 2012
- Fountain Holdings Limited, Director – 2011
- Purple Girl Foundation, Trustee -2018
- Rebuild Lagos Trust Fund, Member Technical Committee - 2021

== Philanthropy ==
In 1999, Adenowo established the Awesome Treasures Foundation (ATF), a faith-based non-governmental organization focused on developing transformational leaders for peace and societal advancement. Recognized by the United Nations and the United States Congress, the foundation operates through a global network of volunteers and partners across six continents. ATF aims to raise 1,000 leaders by 2030, with a special focus on empowering women and youth.

== Recognition and awards ==
- United States Congress in 2023 for her impact on Leadership and Philanthropy.
- Forbes Woman Africa Entrepreneur of the Year 2020
- Forbes Africa 50 Most Powerful Women in Africa 2020
- Forbes Africa 50 Over 50 Most Powerful Women in Africa 2023
- New African Woman in Business Award 2016
- Africa's Most Inspiring Business Woman by the La Batisseurs Des Economie De L’Afrique 2017.
- Featured in the Hall of Fame of people of Black ancestry at the University of West England, Bristol.
- Featured on the Wall of Fame, Obafemi Awolowo University, Ile -Ife 2021
- Included in the "Who Will Be Who in The 21st Century" by the International Biographical Centre in Cambridge, UK 1991
- The International Alliance for Women World of Difference 100 Award
- The Ekiti State Merit Awards, 2014
- Ambassador of Excellence for outstanding achievements in architecture and women's development Obafemi Awolowo University 2018

== Authored publications ==
- Neo Heritage Defining Contemporary African Architecture published by Rizzoli . ISBN 9788891836168
- Beyond My Dreams; September 2019. ISBN 9789785696936
- Acts of the Holy Spirit Vol I ISBN 9789785884302
- Acts of the Holy Spirit Vol II ISBN 9789789948918
- Ruth; Strategic Wisdom to Overcome the Impossible ISBN 9789785739022
- Rahab: Wisdom for a Quantum Change (Kingdom Dynamics for the Market Place) ISBN 9789785739008
- Tamar: Destiny Attained Against all Odds (Kingdom Dynamics for the Marketplace) ISBN 9789785739015
- Appointment with Destiny [Volume 1]: The Path to the Throne
- Lifespring: The Mother's Prayer manual (Revised and Updated Edition). AuthorHouse; ISBN 978-1-4685-8288-8
- The Mysterious Seed: Powerful Secrets of Financial Increase. AuthorHouse; ISBN 978-1-4685-8285-7
- Designed for Marriage. ISBN 978-978-932-589-4
- Adenowo, O., et al. (2024). Curating Transcultural Spaces: Perspectives on Colonial Conflicts in Museum Culture. Edited by Hegenbart, S. New York: Bloomsbury.
- Designed for Marriage. ISBN 978-978-932-589-4
- Mrs. A by Temitope Adeyemi-Kayode, PH.D - https://selar.co/2e524g

== Personal life ==
She is married to Olukorede Adenowo. They have two sons.

== See also ==
- List of Nigerian architects
