= Adegoke Olubummo =

Nigerian mathematician

Adegoke Olubummo was a Nigerian academic and mathematician. He is known for being the first Nigerian professor in mathematics.

== Early life and education ==
Adegoke attended Ifaki Methodist school and finished in 1937. In 1938, he continued to Wesley College in Ibadan. He got his a B.A. from Fourah Bay College in Sierra Leone.

In 1952, he earned his M.A. in Mathematics and Ph.D. in 1955 from King's College, University of Durham.

He began lecturing in the mathematics department at the University College, Ibadan in 1955 and became a full professor in 1964. He was the head of the Department of Mathematics at the University of Ibadan for many years. He became the Dean of the Faculty of Science of Ondo State University after retiring from the University of Ibadan in 1985.

== Personal life ==
Adegoke has three children who are mathematicians. He is the father to the mathematician Yewande Olubummo.
