= Oluwatoyin Asojo =

Nigerian Professor

- Born: Nigeria
- Education: International School Ibadan; Pearson College UWC University of Houston Trent University
- Scientific career
- Fields: Crystallography, proteins, drug resistance, pathogens, mechanisms
- Workplaces: University of Houston Tibotec University of Nebraska Medical Center

Oluwatoyin (Toyin) Asojo is Associate Director for Inclusive Excellence at the Dartmouth Cancer Center. She was previously an associate professor and chair of the Department of Chemistry and Biochemistry at Hampton University and an associate professor of pediatrics-tropical medicine at the Baylor College of Medicine. Asojo works at the interface of math, chemistry, biology, and computation. She is a crystallographer with an interest in the structural studies of proteins from neglected tropical disease pathogens.

== Early life and education ==
Asojo was born in Oyo State, Nigeria, and spent her early life at the University of Ibadan Campus. She was a member of the Ibadan Poetry Club and volunteered at an orphanage while at school. Her father was a chief laboratory scientist at the University of Ibadan. She would spend several hours a week in the lab. She attended the International School Ibadan and applied for a United World College scholarship that would allow her to study abroad, and was one of only seven from ~10,000 applicants to be selected. She earned an International Baccalaureate diploma in 1989 from Pearson College UWC. In 1992, Asojo completed a dual degree at Trent University, majoring in chemistry and economics, followed by a BSc with honors in 1993 in chemistry. Asojo earned a PhD at the University of Houston in 1999.

== Research ==
Asojo has conducted research in industry, academia, and government. After graduating, Asojo was appointed a postdoctoral fellow at the National Cancer Institute. She spent a year as a staff scientist at Tibotec in Rockville, Maryland. In 2003, Asojo joined the University of Nebraska Medical Center as a research assistant professor. She simultaneously managed the X-ray crystallography facility at Eppley Institute for Research in Cancer and Allied Diseases. Here she studied membrane proteins involved in multi-drug resistance. She was awarded two National Institutes of Health grants in 2005, studying alternative treatments to the hookworm infection. She held an adjunct position at Olabisi Onabanjo University.

Asojo is a professor of biochemistry and cell biology at Dartmouth's Geisel School of Medicine (https://geiselmed.dartmouth.edu/faculty/facultydb/view.php/?uid=8447), and was previously at Hampton University in Hampton, VA, where she was an associate professor of chemistry and biochemistry, and Baylor College of Medicine, where her lab was dedicated to the production, purification and crystallization of proteins. At Baylor College of Medicine, she worked with the Texas Children's Vaccine Center and the National School of Tropical Medicine. She coordinated summer research projects for disadvantaged high school students through the American Chemical Society Project SEED. She won the Carnegie African Diaspora Fellowship in 2016. Since 2014, Asojo has been an editor for Nature's Scientific Reports and an associate editor specializing in crystallography for BMC Structural Biology.

== Awards and honors ==
2016 - Society for Science & the Public Science Advocate Grant program

2016 - Carnegie African Diaspora Fellowship in 2016.

2017 - Baylor College of Medicine Norton Rose Fulbright Faculty Excellence Award in Teaching

== Selected publications ==
Asojo's most cited publications include:

- Asojo, O. A., Goud, G., Dhar, K., Loukas, A., Zhan, B., Deumic, V., ... & Hotez, P. J. (2005). X-ray structure of Na-ASP-2, a pathogenesis-related-1 protein from the nematode parasite, Necator americanus, and a vaccine antigen for human hookworm infection. Journal of molecular biology, 346(3), 801-814.(Cited 165 times, according to Google Scholar)
- Asojo, O. A., Gulnik, S. V., Afonina, E., Yu, B., Ellman, J. A., Haque, T. S., & Silva, A. M. (2003). Novel uncomplexed and complexed structures of plasmepsin II, an aspartic protease from Plasmodium falciparum. Journal of molecular biology, 327(1), 173-181. (Cited 152 times, according to Google Scholar.)
- Nachon, F., Asojo, O. A., Borgstahl, G. E., Masson, P., & Lockridge, O. (2005). Role of water in aging of human butyrylcholinesterase inhibited by echothiophate: the crystal structure suggests two alternative mechanisms of aging. Biochemistry, 44(4), 1154-1162. (Cited 116 times, according to Google Scholar.)
- Asojo, O. A., Afonina, E., Gulnik, S. V., Yu, B., Erickson, J. W., Randad, R., ... & Silva, A. M. (2002). Structures of Ser205 mutant plasmepsin II from Plasmodium falciparum at 1.8 Å in complex with the inhibitors rs367 and rs370. Acta Crystallographica Section D: Biological Crystallography, 58(12), 2001-2008.
- Hotez, P. J., Asojo, O. A., & Adesina, A. M. (2012). Nigeria:“Ground Zero" for the High Prevalence Neglected Tropical Diseases. PLoS Negl Trop Dis, 6(7), e1600.
