= Arthur Prest =

Nigerian politician (1906–1976)

Chief Arthur Prest
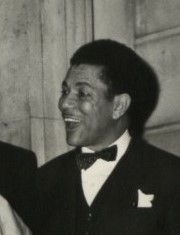
- Born: 1906
- Died: 1976 (aged 69–70)
- Occupation: Politician
- Spouse: Elizabeth Prest

Chief Arthur Edward Prest (10 February 1906 – 26 September 1976) was a Nigerian politician of biracial heritage from the Warri division of southern Nigeria.

== Life ==
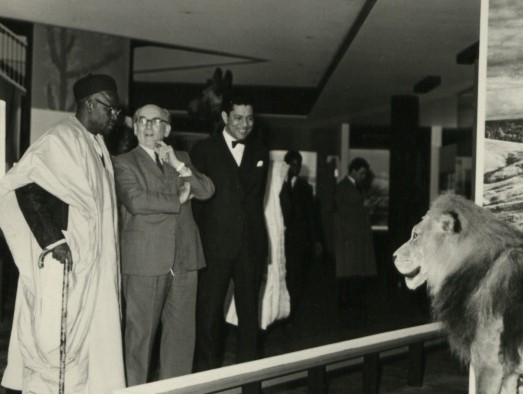
At the Commonwealth Institute with Mr. Kenneth Bradley, C. M. G., (centre) Director of the Institute, and Chief Arthur Prest (right), Acting High Commissioner for the Federation of Nigeria

Prest was born in February 1906 to a white English father from Liverpool who was a ship's captain and a merchant trader, and an Itsekiri royal Nigerian mother, Princess Mami Ogbe, who was the daughter of the Olu of Warri. In 1946, Prest was given the chieftaincy title of the Olorogun of Warri by the Olu of Warri, his kinsman.

Prest was an officer in the Nigerian police force and the first Nigerian commissioned police officer. He studied law in England, and registered at the Supreme Court of Nigeria in 1947, prior to his nomination as a representative of the Warri district in the Western Regional House of Assembly. He later became a High Court Judge in the then Mid-Western Region.

In 1950 Prest and Anthony Enahoro founded the Mid-West Party. Enahoro had already started the Mid-West Press and published the Nigerian newspaper from 1950 to 1953. In 1951, the Mid-West Party became part of the Action Group.

Prest was later made regional minister at Ibadan and deputy leader to Obafemi Awolowo. Further, he was appointed federal minister for communications in 1952. Prest, Awolowo, Sir Ahmadu Bello, Anthony Enahoro and others fought for Nigeria's independence and attended the Lancaster House talks that negotiated Nigeria's independence. He left the Action Group in 1957. Following this, Prest was High Commissioner for the Federation of Nigeria to the UK.

In 1971, Prest was involved in a prominent court case. He challenged the Itsekiri Communal Lands Trust which wanted to use the purported overlord rights of the Olu of Warri over lands in Warri. The overlord rights would have given the trust indirect ownership of all lands, including overriding the rights of ownership of landlords. However, the communal lands trust lost the case.

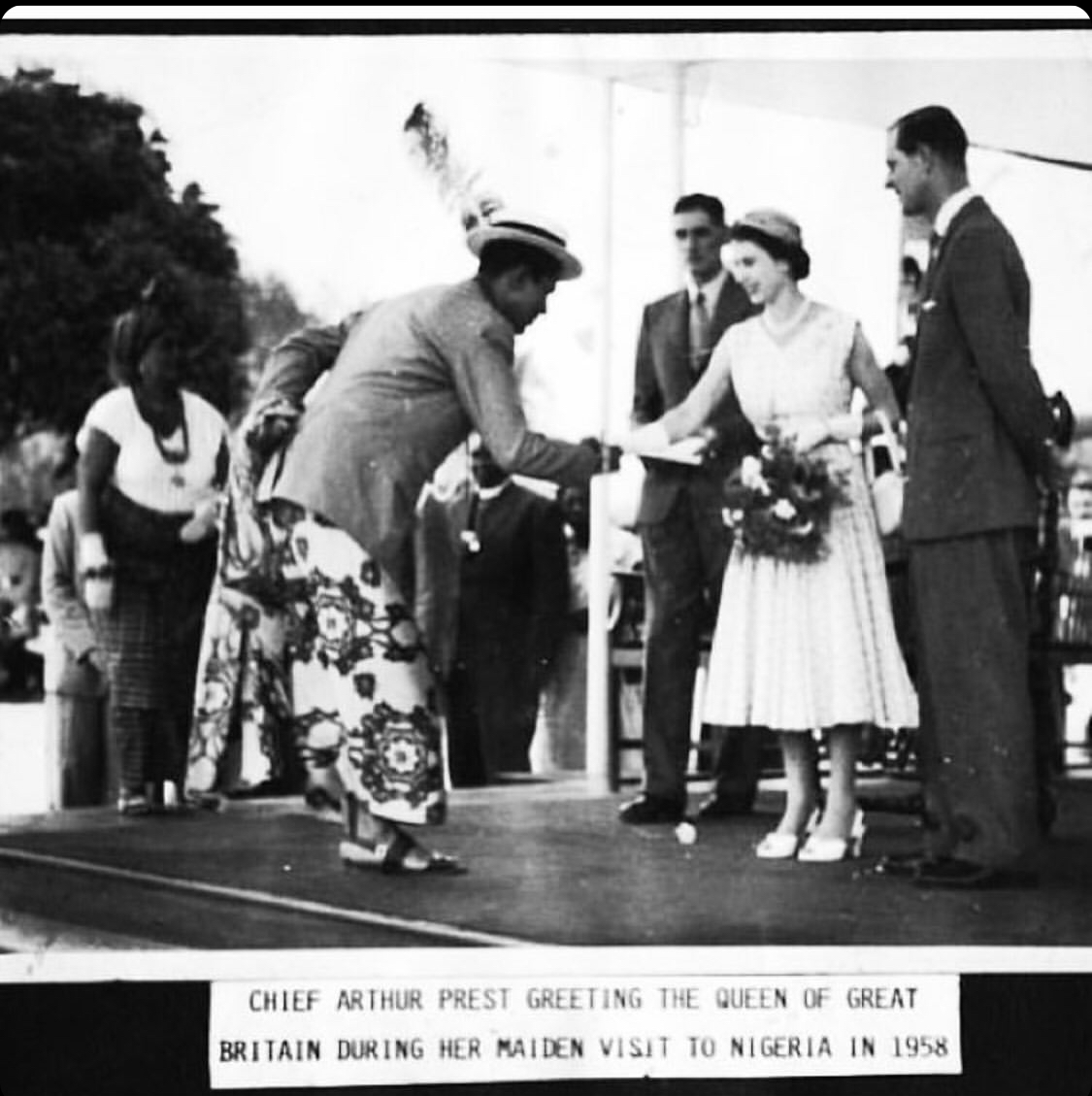
Arthur Prest with Queen Elizabeth II and Prince Philip

Prest had a rich and full family life. He had several children, the most prominent being his first son Chief Michael Godwin Prest, who became a successful lawyer, politician and Chief of Staff to Nigerian President Shehu Shagari in 1979. Chief Michael Prest had 4 children. His eldest child and granddaughter to Arthur Prest is Helen Prest-Ajayi, a former Miss Nigeria in 1979, lawyer, author and literacy advocate. His son and grandson of Arthur Prest, Michael J. Prest is Nigeria's first oil trader, oil tycoon and philanthropist. He was the architect of the company law case of Prest v Petrodel Resources Ltd that has been taught in law schools and defined the direction of company law.

Chief Arthur Prest died in 1976.

== Further information ==
- KWJ Post, The Nigerian Federal Election of 1959: Politics & Administration in a Developing Political System. Oxford, 1963
- Richard L Sklar, Nigerian Political Parties: Power in an Emergent African Nation, Princeton, NJ, 1963
- Michael Vickers, Ethnicity & Sub-Nationalism in Nigeria: Movement for a Mid-West State, Oxford, 2000
- Michael Vickers, A Nation Betrayed: Nigeria & the Minorities Commission of 1957, Trenton, NJ, 2010
