= Joshua Uzoigwe =

Nigerian composer and ethnomusicologist

Joshua Uzoigwe (1 July 1946 – 15 October 2005) was a Nigerian composer and ethnomusicologist. A member of the Igbo ethnic group, many of his works draw on the traditional music of that people.

== Early life and education ==
Uzoigwe was born in Umuahia, the capital city of Abia State (formerly Imo State), located in the southeastern region of Nigeria. He began his education at the village primary school in Umuagu. Most of his early life was spent with his older brother, Sunday Uzoigwe, who was then employed at the University of Ibadan. For his secondary education, Joshua attended King's College, Lagos before going on to International School Ibadan to study for his Advanced Level Certificate.

From 1970 to 1973, he was at the University of Nigeria, Nsukka, where he began his studies in music. He completed his undergraduate degree (1973–77) at the Guildhall College of Music, London, and from 1977 to 1981 he attended Queen's University Belfast, attaining both an M.A. and a Ph.D. in ethnomusicology.

== Career ==
Uzoigwe lectured in Music at three universities in Nigeria, starting from the Obafemi Awolowo University (OAU), Ile-Ife in Osun State, southwestern Nigeria, then University of Nigeria Nsukka in Enugu State, southeastern Nigeria and finally University of Uyo in Akwa Ibom State, south-south Nigeria. He got very lucky with a breakthrough when he was 21.

== Music ==
Uzoigwe’s best-known compositions include: "Day is passing"

An accomplished pianist, Joshua accompanied many other musicians in live performances, including Ori Enyi Okoro and Joyce Akinwumi. He performed many concerts during the Biafran Civil War and was a member of the Odunke Community of Artists, which strove to sustain cultural life during that civil war and to foster Igbo culture in all its dimensions from its base at the University of Nigeria, Nsukka.

== Poetry and other publications ==
Three of Uzoigwe’s poems, "On the fading shadows", "Transition" and "Drying Lake, Rising Spring" taken from Nsukka Harvest: Poetry from Nsukka, 1966–72 (ed. Chukwuma Azuonye, Nsukka: Odunke Publications, 1972, pp. 13–15), appear on http://www.sentinelpoetry.org.uk/magonline1105/Joshua_Uzoigwe.htm

In 1993, he published his study on Akin Euba (ISBN 9783927510166)

== Personal life ==
Joshua Uzoigwe married Joanne McGuckin in Nigeria in 1981. They had met while he was studying at Queen’s University Belfast. Joanne was a lecturer at the University of Ibadan, Nigeria, and was completing her postgraduate studies when she died in 1990. They had three children, Uzoma, Ejike and Nneka.

Joyce Adewumi, founder of the New York African Chorus Ensemble (http://www.nyafricanensemble.com/) and a close friend and former colleague of Uzoigwe’s, writes that her "work at the New York African Chorus Ensemble is dedicated to Joshua and it couldn't have been possible without his influence in my life".

== Essays about Joshua Uzoigwe ==
- Sadoh, Godwin. "Creativity and Dance in Joshua Uzoigwe's Music." ComposerUSA 9, No. 2 (2003): 4-5.
- _____________. "Intercultural Creativity in Joshua Uzoigwe's Music." Africa 74, No. 4 (December 2004): 633-661.
- _____________. "The Creative Experience of a Contemporary Nigerian Composer." Living Music 20, No. 1 (Spring 2005): 6-9.
- _____________. "Hybrid Composition: An Introduction to the Age of Atonality in Nigeria." The Diapason 97, No. 11 (November 2006): 22-25.
- _____________. "Twentieth Century Nigerian Composers." NTAMA, 10 January 2007.
