= Babatunde Yusuf =

Nigerian footballer

Yusuf Babatunde
Personal information
- Full name: Yusuph Babatunde Bakare
- Date of birth: June 13, 1983 (age 43)
- Place of birth: Owu, Nigeria
- Position: Defender

Team information
- Current team: Kwara United F.C.
- Number: 2

Youth career
- –1999: Calabar Rovers

Senior career*
Years	Team	Apps	(Gls)
1999–2000	Calabar Rovers	6	(0)
2000–2001	FAAN F.C.	17	(0)
2001–2002	Crown F.C.	20	(0)
2002–2003	Bida Lions F.C.	11	(0)
2003–2004	Diskabog F.C.	39	(0)
2005–present	Kwara United F.C.		
- * Club domestic league appearances and goals as of December 31, 2006

Yusuph Babatunde Bakare (born January 29, 1985, in Osi) is a Nigerian football player currently with Kwara United F.C. of Ilorin.

== Early life ==
Hails from Osi in the Ekiti local government area of Kwara State.

== Career ==
He is otherwise called ‘Keshi', he started his professional career with the Calabar Rovers of Calabar (1999–2000), FAAN F.C. of Lagos (2000–2001), Crown F.C. of Ogbomoso (2001–2002), Bida Lions F.C. (2002–2003), Diskabog F.C. of Ilorin (2003–2004) and Kwara United F.C. of Ilorin (2005 to date). He was two time runner-up in the state FA Cup in Niger (2002) & Kwara (2003) and won the 2005 edition with Kwara United F.C.
