= Amaka Osakwe =

Nigerian fashion designer

- Born: Nigeria
- Citizenship: Nigerian
- Education: Central Saint Martins
- Alma mater: University of the Arts London
- Occupation: Fashion designer
- Organization: Maki Oh
- Known for: Founder of Maki Oh; contemporary African fashion design
- Notable work: Maki Oh fashion collections
- Title: Creative Director, Maki Oh

Amaka Osakwe is a Nigerian fashion designer and creator of the African-based fashion label named Maki Oh. She has led her womanswear label since 2010 from Lagos, and it is a Nigerian-based label that is globally acknowledged.

== Life and career ==
Osakwe is of the Igbo tribe. She studied at the Arts University Bournemouth where she received a BA in fashion studies. In autumn/winter 2010 she launched her label. Inspired by rural Ghana’s Dipo rites-of-passage ceremony, during which girls taking part are partially naked and ornately adorned, Osakwe has played with cloaking and ornamentation using traditional African fabrics. Recently her label was discovered by the U.S. fashion scene in 2012, when she presented her designs at the New York Fashion Week. A signature of her brand is her use of a traditional Yoruba indigo-dyed textile called adire, a cultural specialty whose practice revolves around modern-day Ogun and Osun states in western Nigeria. Another is her way of combining Western silhouettes and native materials and motifs—to wit, a lace-blouse-and-pencil-skirt set appliquéd with unsettling raffia eyeballs.

International stars such as singers Beyoncé and Rihanna and Hollywood actress Kerry Washington have worn outfits by the Nigerian designers. U.S. First Lady Michelle Obama, well-known for being a style icon, wore an Amaka Osakwe-designed Maki Oh blouse during summer 2013 trip to South Africa. Her designs also have been worn by the likes of Solange Knowles, Lady Gaga, Issa Rae, and Leelee Sobieski and by Nigerian TV presenter Eku Edewor and are sold internationally through Farfetch.com, and in United States at the McMullen boutique in Oakland.

Osakwe was named "Designer of the Year" by African fashion magazine ARISE. Since 2010, her work has been showcased at the Museum at the Fashion Institute of Technology, the Vitra Design Museum, and the Brighton Museum & Art Gallery.
