= Samuel Tunde Bajah =

- Born: April 24, 1934; Warri, Delta State, Nigeria
- Died: 23 February 2008 (aged 73)
- Education: University of Ibadan; Oxford University; University of South Dakota
- Occupation: Educator
- Known for: Science Education in Nigeria
- Spouse: Ebun Agatha (m. 1963–2008)
- Children: 7

Samuel Olatunde Emiko Bajah (24 April 1934 – 23 February 2008) was science teacher and author. He co-wrote Chemistry: A New Certificate Approach with Arthur Godman.

== Personal life ==
Bajah was born on April 24, 1934, in Warri, Delta State, Nigeria to Joseph Bajah, a clerk with United Africa Company (UAC) in Burutu, and his wife, Mary Bajah.

Bajah married his wife, Ebun Agatha Bajah (née Olomu) on June 15, 1963, and together they had two sons and five daughters.

== Education ==
Samuel Tunde Bajah began his primary education at St. Andrews C.M.S. School, Warri, Delta State. Between 1949 and 1954, he attended Hussey College Warri where he obtained his West African Examination Certificate (WAEC). Bajah was in the school's athletic team that won the Grier Cup in 1954.

Bajah proceeded to the University of Ibadan, Oyo State, Nigeria where he obtained a B.Sc. (Hons) in Chemistry and graduated in 1962. At the University of Ibadan, he played soccer and was elected University Football Captain in 1962. Between 1963 and 1964, he was at the Oxford University for a Post-graduate Diploma in Education. He attended the University of South Dakota United States for his M.A and PhD degrees.

== Teaching career ==
Bajah started his teaching career as a chemistry teacher at his alma-mater, Hussey College, in 1962. He rose to the position of Director of Science of the School in 1965 and held this position until 1967. He joined the International School, University of Ibadan on 3 May 1967 and taught there till 1972. He proceeded to the University of South Dakota in the United States for his doctorate programme in Science Education in 1969. In 1972, he returned to Nigeria with his masters and doctoral degrees.

He returned to the Institute of Education, University of Ibadan as Research Fellow II. In the Institute of Education, he rose from the rank of Research Fellow II in 1972 to that of a Professor of Science Education and Evaluation in 1984.

At the University of Ibadan, he was nominated to the editorial boards of national and international journals. He was appointed Editor, West African Journal for Education between 1974 and 1980. He was the Acting Director of the Institute of Education from 1983 to 1985 and in 1989 he was elected the Dean of the Faculty of Education. He functioned fully as the Director of the Institute from 1996, leaving office in 1999.

Bajah was Director Education at the Commonwealth Secretariat, London (1991–1994). He featured either as a participant or consultant in conferences and workshops in Africa, Europe, America and Australia and a consultant to international organisations, including the World Bank, UNESCO, UNICEF, SIDA and DSE.

He established an NGO called Early Learning Science Series For Africa.

== Publications ==
Bajah was a writer of science books for students. Chemistry for Secondary Schools (A New Certificate Approach) which he co-authored with Arthur Godman, has been translated into six languages to include French and Spanish. The other science publications he wrote include Laboratory Exercise in Volumetric Analysis (Chemistry), Primary Science for Nigerian Schools, and African Science: Facts or Fiction.

== Awards and honours ==
In 1982 he became Fellow, Science Teachers Association of Nigeria (FSTAN). He was made Fellow, Chemical Society of Nigeria (FCSN) in 1998. In 1992, he was also honoured with the Distinguished Service to Science Education Worldwide. He was honoured with the Distinguished Chemical Society of Nigeria awards in 1996. Bajah was also a member of Royal Institute of Chemistry, United Kingdom; and a member of the Association of Science Education, United States.

== Death ==
Bajah died on 23 February 2008, aged 73.
