= Olukorede Adenowo =

Nigerian Bank CEOs

- Born: 1966 March 01; Oyo, Nigeria
- Occupation: Managing Director
- Organization: First Bank, United Kingdom
- Spouse: Olajumoke Adenowo

Olukorede Adenowo (born March 1, 1966) is a banking professional and was formerly the Chief Executive Officer of Standard Chartered Bank, Nigeria. He was previously the bank's Executive Director of Corporate, Commercial, and Institutional Banking, responsible for Nigeria and West Africa. He is also an executive director on the board of the bank. He was also previously the managing director and chief executive officer of Standard Chartered Bank (SCB) in Gambia and Senegal; the deputy managing director and deputy CEO for SCB, Cameroon, a non-executive director at SCB Gambia and Sierra Leone, and vice president of the Gambia Bankers Association and trustee of the Institute of Bankers of Gambia.

== Early life ==
Korede was born on March 1, 1966, in Ibadan, Nigeria, where he had his primary education at Maryhill Convent School and his secondary education at the International School, Ibadan (ISI).

== Education ==
In 1987, Korede got a BSc. Hon. in Economics at the University of Ife in Osun State, Nigeria, and a Master of Business Administration from the Lagos Business School under the IESE—International Graduate School of Management—at the University of Navarra in Barcelona, Spain. He is an alumnus of INSEAD and Said Business School of Oxford University and a member of the Institute of Chartered Accountants of Nigeria (ICAN)

== Career ==
Adenowo started his career working for Société Générale Bank Nigeria and Deloitte Nigeria, where he qualified as a chartered accountant in 1990. Deloitte Nigeria honored him with a Distinguished Alumni Award in 2015.

== Marriage and children ==
Korede Adenowo is married to Jumoke Adenowo. They both have two children, Toluwaloju Adenowo and Toluwalase Adenowo.
