= Yewande Olubummo =

Nigerian-American mathematician

- Born: February 8, 1960 (age 66)
- Education: Yale University; University of Massachusetts Amherst
- Scientific career
- Fields: Dynamical systems, functional analysis
- Workplaces: Spelman College; Smith College

Yewande Olubummo (born February 8, 1960) is a Nigerian-American mathematician whose research interests include functional analysis and dynamical systems. She is an associate professor of mathematics at Spelman College, where she served as chair of the mathematics department from 2006 to 2010. She is a member of the National Association of Mathematicians, as well as the Mathematical Association of America.

== Early life and education ==
Olubummo is originally from Ibadan in Nigeria, and is the oldest of three children of mathematician Adegoke Olubummo and hospital administrator Edak Olubummo; her father was the second Nigerian to earn a doctorate in mathematics. As a child, she was educated at the staff school of the University of Ibadan, where her father taught, and then at the International School Ibadan on the university campus. She earned a bachelor's degree with first class honours in mathematics from the University of Ibadan in 1980, and did her compulsory national service in the National Youth Service Corps as a mathematics teacher in Keffi.

On the advice of her father Olubummo moved abroad for graduate study, choosing Yale University over the University of Oxford (to which she was also admitted) because of its financial assistance. She felt alone, isolated, and the victim of racial discrimination at Yale; she did poorly on her doctoral exams, and ended up leaving in 1983 with a master's degree. At the suggestion of a visiting African-American mathematics professor, Donald F. St. Mary, she transferred to the University of Massachusetts Amherst, where she completed her doctorate eight years later in 1991. Her dissertation, Measures on Empirical Logics and the Properties of Their Associated Dual Banach Spaces, was supervised by Thurlow Cook.

== Career ==
While working towards her doctorate, Olubummo taught mathematics at Smith College. There, in 1991, she met Sylvia Bozeman, who had been visiting Smith as part of an academic audit of the Smith mathematics department. On Bozeman's recommendation, she took a position as a lecturer at Spelman College, and in 2000 she was promoted to associate professor. She served as chair of the mathematics department at Spelman from 2006 to 2010. In 2009, she was awarded the Spelman College Presidential Award for Teaching Excellence, whilst in 2018 she was awarded the Carnegie Foundation Africa Diaspora Fellowship, allowing her to run a graduate level course in functional analysis at Kwara State University, Ilorin. She is currently a faculty member of the National Alliance for Doctoral Studies in the Mathematical Sciences, an organisation which aims to improve representation of minorities in Mathematics.

Beyond her research, Olubummo is interested in increasing the participation of underrepresented groups in mathematics both in the US and in Nigeria. At Spelman, she led a National Science Foundation funded program, the Math Research and Mentoring Program, to encourage minority undergraduates in mathematics to go on to graduate study. In 2018, the Institute of International Education awarded Olubummo a Carnegie African Diaspora Fellowship, funding her travel to return to Nigeria and teach graduate-level mathematics as a visiting professor at Kwara State University.

She has published (with Thurlow A. Cook) Operational logics and the Hahn-Jordan property.

She was honored by Mathematically Gifted & Black in 2024 when she was added to their "Circle of Excellence."
