= Bamidele Abiodun =

Nigerian business personality

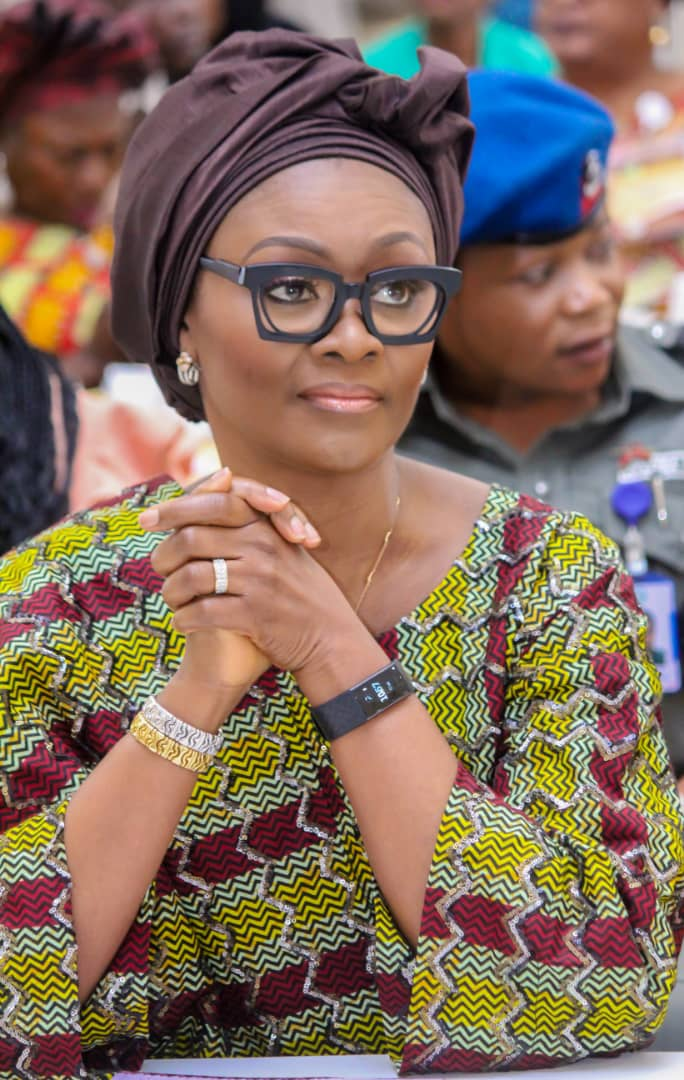
- H.E, First Lady Of Ogun State, Mrs Bamidele Adiodun
- Born: 16 July 1966 (age 59)
- Occupations: businesswoman, Philanthropist
- Spouse: Dapo Abiodun

Bamidele Abiodun (née Oduye; born 16 July 1966) is a Nigerian businesswoman, philanthropist and wife of Dapo Abiodun, governor of Ogun State, Nigeria.

== Early life and education ==
Bamidele Abiodun was born on 16 July 1966 to the family of Professor Oladipo Oduye, a former deputy vice chancellor at the University of Ibadan, Nigeria and the late Mrs Abimbola Wosilat Oduye both from Ilishan-Remo, Ogun State. She attended The International School, Ibadan for her secondary education and then obtained a Bachelor of Science Degree in Zoology from The University of Ibadan in 1988.

== Business and philanthropy ==
Abiodun entered the world of business in the mid-1990s. As first lady of Ogun State, she has initiated several programs with a focus on social welfare, education and poverty reduction. She has also been linked with ongoing work at the School for Special Needs in Abeokuta, Ogun State. In the month of August 2019, Mrs. Abiodun, in partnership with Learn Africa Plc. donated 42,000 books to primary and secondary schools in Ogun State.

In November 2019, Abiodun presented her commitment to advance the implementation of the International Conference on Population and Development (ICPD) Program of Action, at a high-level conference convened by the United Nations Population Fund (UNFPA) in Nairobi, Kenya.

On 6 February 2019 Abiodun partnered with First City Monument Bank (FCMB) on the SHEVENTURES program, an initiative focused on boosting the economic capacity of women by offering both financial and non-financial support to small and medium scale businesses owned by women. SHEVENTURES announced plans to grant 40 business women with small and medium scale businesses in Ogun State, interest-free loans quarterly.

== Personal life ==
Bamidele Abiodun married Dapo Abiodun in 1990 and had five children, including the late Olugbenga Abiodun, a Nigerian DJ also known as DJ Olu.

== See also ==
- List of first ladies of Nigerian states
