= The Great British Sewing Bee series 12 =

The Great British Sewing Bee
- Series 12
- Starring: Sophie Willan (Host); Esme Young (Judge); Patrick Grant (Judge)
- No. of episodes: 10

Release
- Original network: BBC One
- Original release: 14 July – 15 September 2026

Series chronology
- ← Previous; Series 11

The twelfth series of The Great British Sewing Bee began on 14 July 2026. This series has a new presenter, Sophie Willan, replacing Sara Pascoe from the previous series. Both Esme Young and Patrick Grant return as judges. The series consists of 12 contestants competing to be named the best sewer. The show airs on BBC One. The series was again recorded at Sunny Bank Mills (the venue used since series 8), a former textile mill located in Farsley, Leeds. The mill, which was founded in 1829, was a working textile mill until 2008.

== The Sewers ==
| Sewer | Age | Occupation | Place of Residency | Placement |
|---|---|---|---|---|
| Adele Burn | 36 | Primary school teacher | West Yorkshire | 6th |
| Angie Hinksman | 63 | Retired lecturer | Warwickshire | 10th |
| Anna Pownall | 27 | Barista & waitress | North Yorkshire | 1st |
| Beth Eames | 24 | Engineering Ph.D. student | Oxfordshire | Runner-up |
| Dawn | 64 | Chief Financial Officer | London | 12th |
| Emma Morwood | 45 | Classical soprano | Midlothian | Runner-up |
| Heather Storrod | 28 | Project manager | West Midlands | 4th |
| Lewis | 29 | Primary school teacher | East Sussex | 9th |
| Minnie | 30 | Full-time mum | Bedfordshire | 7th |
| Rebecca Weare | 27 | Chartered actuary | London | 5th |
| Sam Stephens | 31 | Heating engineer | West Yorkshire | 11th |
| Tim Freathy | 60 | Care farm director | Suffolk | 8th |

== Results and Eliminations ==
| Sewer | 1 | 2 | 3 | 4 | 5 | 6 | 7 | 8 | 9 | 10 |
|---|---|---|---|---|---|---|---|---|---|---|
| Anna | | | WIN | | WIN | | WIN | | | WINNER |
| Beth | | | | | | | | WIN | WIN | RUNNER-UP |
| Emma | WIN | | | | | | | | | RUNNER-UP |
| Heather | | | | WIN | | | | | ELIM | |
| Rebecca | | | | | | WIN | | ELIM | | |
| Adele | | WIN | | | | | ELIM | | | |
| Minnie | | | | | | ELIM | | | | |
| Tim | | | | | ELIM | | | | | |
| Lewis | | | | ELIM | | | | | | |
| Angie | | | ELIM | | | | | | | |
| Sam | | ELIM | | | | | | | | |
| Dawn | ELIM | | | | | | | | | |

Sewer won Garment of the Week

One of the judges' favourite sewers

Sewer was safe and got through to next round

One of the judges' least favourite sewers

Sewer was eliminated

== Episodes ==
Sewer eliminated Garment of the Week

=== Episode 1: British Summertime Week ===
In this episode, the pattern challenge was to make Summer shorts. The transformation challenge was to make a bag, which has a clear functional purpose, from two barbeque aprons. The made-to-measure challenge involved the sewers making an outfit for themselves, suitable for a perfect Summer day.

| Sewer | Pattern Challenge (Summer Shorts) | Transformation Challenge (Functional Bag) | | Made-to-measure (Perfect Summer Day) |
|---|---|---|---|---|
| Adele | 11 | Festival Bag | 5 | Strawberry Picking Dress |
| Angie | 8 | Travel Sewing Bag | 4 | Day-trip Dress |
| Anna | 1 | Hat Bag | 1 | Picnic Two-piece |
| Beth | 2 | Water Bottle Bag | 2 | Festival Two-piece |
| Dawn | 9 | Sewing Bag | 10 | Day-to-night Beach Dress |
| Emma | 4 | Music Bag | 7 | Swimming Twin Set |
| Heather | 10 | Gym Bag | 3 | Chelsea Day Dress |
| Lewis | 5 | Bag for a Wet Summer Walk | 11 | Smock & Shorts |
| Minnie | 6 | Knitting Bag | 8 | Heritage Dress |
| Rebecca | 3 | Rucksack | 6 | Farmer's Market Wrap Dress |
| Sam | 12 | Sports Bag | 9 | Holiday Two-piece |
| Tim | 7 | Fruit Collecting Bag | 12 | Two-piece Suit |

=== Episode 2: Prints and Colours Week ===
The pattern challenge was to make an adaptive shell top. For this, the judges were joined by fashion designer Victoria Jenkins, who also judged a similar challenge in series 11. The transformation challenge made use of purple and brown clothing. The made-to-measure challenge was to make an outfit using different fabrics and textures, but which had one dominent colour.

| Sewer | Pattern Challenge (Adaptive Shell Top) | Transformation Challenge (Purple and Brown Clothing) | | Made-to-measure (One Colour Outfit) |
|---|---|---|---|---|
| Adele | 10 | Top with Shoulder Straps | 8 | Cross-back Top & Culottes |
| Angie | 9 | Skirt with a Purple Tie | 10 | Wrap Top & Skirt |
| Anna | 2 | Asymmetric Top | 4 | Victorian-style Dress |
| Beth | 3 | Matching Top and Skirt Set | 7 | Maxi Dress |
| Emma | 7 | Asymmetric Top with Floral Print | 1 | Waistcoat & Skirt |
| Heather | 8 | Sleeveless Dress With Cut-Outs | 5 | Peplum Top & Dress |
| Lewis | 6 | Ruffled Bando Top | 9 | Cross-back Top & Skirt |
| Minnie | 4 | Halter Top | 6 | Velvet Dress |
| Rebecca | 1 | Full-length Evening Gown | 3 | Godet Dress |
| Sam | 11 | Wrap Skirt | 11 | Kaftan Dress |
| Tim | 5 | Halterneck Top With Drape | 2 | Batik Shirt & Shorts |

=== Episode 3: Reduce, Reuse and Recycle Week ===
The Balsam Flower Dress

The pattern challenge was to make three knickers out of second-hand T-shirts. This was the first time in the Sewing Bee that the pattern challenge required making multiple copies of the same item. The transformation challenge was to make a garment with "drama at the back" using cloth remnants and other materials destined to go to waste. The made-to-measure challenge was to make an outfit that has an environmental message.

This episode's winning garment, the Balsam Flower Dress made by Anna using Indian calico stamped with balsam flowers, was described by Patrick as "extraordinarily beautiful and incredibly well thought-through" and that "it was one of the best things we've ever seen in Sewing Bee".

| Sewer | Pattern Challenge (Knickers) | Transformation Challenge (Garment with "Drama at the Back") | | Made-to-measure (Garment with an Environmental Message) |
|---|---|---|---|---|
| Adele | 8 | Gathered and Tied Top | 8 | 'Save Our Seas' Dress |
| Angie | 7 | Coffee Bean Skirt | 10 | Patchwork Dress |
| Anna | 6 | Long Green Dress | 1 | Balsam Flower Dress |
| Beth | 4 | Striped Dress with Back Drape | 6 | Outfit for Life |
| Emma | 1 | Romeo & Juliet | 4 | Sewers vs Sewers Jumpsuit |
| Heather | 5 | Top with a Bow at the Back | 3 | Overfishing Two-piece |
| Lewis | 9 | Tabard with Hood | 9 | Organic Jumpsuit |
| Minnie | 2 | Ocean Netting Garment | 5 | Hand-stitched Outfit |
| Rebecca | 3 | Pink & Black Skirt | 2 | Tent Jumpsuit |
| Tim | 10 | Dress with Waterfall Drape | 7 | Grow Your Power Two-piece |

=== Episode 4: Mexico Week ===
For this episode, the judges were joined by Mexican fashion entrepeneur Erika Alvarez. The pattern challenge was to make a blouse using Oaxacan fabric and various ribbons and trims. The transformation challenge was to make a sculptural garment using two 'manteles de hule' (oilskin tablecloths). The made-to-measure challenge was to make an outfit for a Mexican festival.

| Sewer | Pattern Challenge (Mexican Folkoric Top) | Transformation Challenge (Sculptural Garment) | | Made-to-measure (Mexican Festival Outfit) |
|---|---|---|---|---|
| Adele | 6 | Top with Puffy Sleeves | 8 | Fiesta Grande de Enero Dress |
| Anna | 2 | Dress with Detachable Segments | 4 | Mexican Independence Day Dress |
| Beth | 1 | Orange Flying Saucer Sweet Dress and Hat | 3 | Día del Charro Dress |
| Emma | 3 | Dress with Fan | 6 | Fiesta de Santa Cecilia Outfit |
| Heather | 7 | Rain Coat style Dress with Hood | 5 | Fiesta Grande de Enero Outfit |
| Lewis | 5 | Rain Jacket with Hood | 9 | Carnaval de Veracruz Outfit |
| Minnie | 8 | One Shoulder Dress with Ruffles | 2 | Mexican Independence Day Outfit |
| Rebecca | 4 | Gingham Dress with Sunray-pleated Bodice | 1 | Guelaguetza Outfit |
| Tim | 9 | Dress with Fans | 7 | Carnaval de Tlaxcala Outfit |

=== Episode 5: Sports Week ===
In this episode the pattern challenge saw sewers making swimming shorts. For the transformation challenge, the sewers - working in pairs - created a two-piece outfit using a windsurfing sail. For the made-to-measure challenge, the sewers made embroidered bowling shirts, incorporating both appliqué and embroidery.

| Sewer | Pattern Challenge (Swimming Shorts) | Transformation Challenge (Two-piece Outfit) | | Made-to-measure (Bowling Shirt) |
|---|---|---|---|---|
| Adele | 8 | Triangle Top & Skirt | 3 | Blackburn Bowling Shirt |
| Anna | 5 | Criss-cross Trouser Suit | 1 | Cookery Bowling Shirt |
| Beth | 2 | Turquoise Stripe Dress | 2 | Barbell Club Bowling Shirt |
| Emma | 3 | Bustier Two-piece | 4 | Diving Bowling Shirt |
| Heather | 1 | Bustier Two-piece | 4 | Paragliding Bowling Shirt |
| Minnie | 7 | Turquoise Stripe Dress | 2 | Ice Hockey Bowling Shirt |
| Rebecca | 4 | Criss-cross Trouser Suit | 1 | Badgers Bowling Shirt |
| Tim | 6 | Triangle Top & Skirt | 3 | Early Morning Work Out Bowling Shirt |

=== Episode 6: Kids Week ===
The pattern challenge required the sewers to make a girl's tutu. For the transformation challenge, the sewers had to make a stuffed toy animal, using a child's fleece top. The made-to-measure challenge required sewers to make an original superhero costume for nine-year-olds to wear.

| Sewer | Pattern Challenge (Tutu) | Transformation Challenge (Stuffed Toy Animal) | | Made-to-measure (Superhero Costume) |
|---|---|---|---|---|
| Adele | 7 | Pig | 4 | Super Bee |
| Anna | 2 | Octopus | 1 | Rocket Boy |
| Beth | 1 | Monkey | 3 | Electra |
| Emma | 6 | Stegosaurus | 2 | Zip Kid |
| Heather | 4 | Elephant | 6 | Shapeshifter |
| Minnie | 5 | Teddy Bear | 5 | Cat Girl |
| Rebecca | 3 | Turtle | 7 | Treblemaker |

=== Episode 7: Music Week ===
The pattern challenge required the sewers to make a conical bra with a mesh bodice, such as that worn by Madonna. For the transformation challenge, the sewers had to create individual outfits for two different girl bands using bedroom furnishings (eg duvets, blankets, curtains, etc). The made-to-measure challenge required sewers to make a disco outfit.

| Sewer | Pattern Challenge (Madonna Inspired Cone Bra) | Transformation Challenge (Girl Band Outfits) | | Made-to-measure (Disco-inspired Outfit) |
|---|---|---|---|---|
| Adele | 6 | Halter Top with Skirt and Hat | 6 | Abba Inspired Two-piece |
| Anna | 5 | Two-piece with Cowl Neck and Suspended Skirt | 1 | All Silver Dance Outfit |
| Beth | 3 | Shorts with Studs | 2 | Pan's People-esque Two-piece |
| Emma | 4 | Crop-top and Skirt | 3 | Sparkly Mini Kaftan |
| Heather | 1 | Dress with Gingham Top | 5 | Disco Diva Stage Outfit |
| Rebecca | 2 | Costume using Gathered Curtains | 4 | Halston Inspired Two-piece |

=== Episode 8: Literary Icons Week ===
The pattern challenge required the sewers to make a deerstalker hat, made famous by Sherlock Holmes. For the transformation challenge, sewers had to create an outfit, from school uniforms, that a grown-up Matilda would wear. The made-to-measure challenge had sewers make an outfit inspired by Jane Austen.

| Sewer | Pattern Challenge (Deerstalker) | Transformation Challenge (Matilda-inspired Outfits) | | Made-to-measure (Jane Austen-inspired Outfit) |
|---|---|---|---|---|
| Anna | 5 | Tartan Tearaway | 1 | Goth-sten Outfit for Catherine Morland |
| Beth | 1 | Pleated Top with Shorts | 2 | Portrait Dress for Elizabeth Darcy |
| Emma | 2 | Lattice Top with Culottes | 4 | Austen-tatious Ball Gown |
| Heather | 4 | Pleated Skirt with Gingham Top | 3 | "If I was an Austen Heroine" Dress |
| Rebecca | 3 | Summer Gingham Dress | 5 | Promenade Outfit for Emma Woodhouse |

=== Episode 9: Wardrobe Heroes ===
This episode focused on the staples of people's wardrobes. The pattern challenge had the sewers make a leather jacket, using pre-cut kits made from plant-based leather. For the transformation challenge, sewers created an outfit, suitable for a woman to wear to a wedding, using discarded mens' shirts. The made-to-measure challenge had sewers making an outfit inspired by the little black dress.

| Sewer | Pattern Challenge (Plant-based Leather Jacket) | Transformation Challenge (Wedding Guest Outfit) | | Made-to-measure (Little Black Dress-inspired Outfit) |
|---|---|---|---|---|
| Anna | 4 | Muted Collared Two-piece | 1 | LBD Inspired Dress |
| Beth | 1 | Green Corduroy Dress | 4 | LBD Inspired Outfit |
| Emma | 2 | Floral Two-piece | 2 | LBD Inspired Dress |
| Heather | 3 | Gathered Pink and Pale Blue Dress | 3 | LBD Inspired Dress |

=== Episode 10: Final ===
The pattern challenge had the sewers making a cummerbund and a bow tie, such as a man would wear to a gala. For the transformation challenge, sewers were given gala tableware and were asked to create a chic outfit, suitable for a beach club. For the final made-to-measure challenge, the sewers had to make a metamorphosis-themed gala outfit. For this challenge, the sewers selected close friends to use as their live models.

| Sewer | Pattern Challenge (Cummerbund & Bow Tie) | Transformation Challenge (Beach Club Outfit) | | Made-to-measure (Metamorphosis-themed Gala Outfit) |
|---|---|---|---|---|
| Anna | 1 | Dress with Orange Pom-poms | 1 | Damselfly Dress |
| Beth | 3 | Peach and Floral Asymmetric Dress | 2 | Straw to Gold Dress |
| Emma | 2 | Silver and Lilac Jumpsuit | 3 | Mum On The School Run to Woman On A Night Out Oufit |

== Ratings ==
| Episode no. | Airdate | Total viewers (millions) | Weekly ranking all channels |
|---|---|---|---|
| 1 | 14 July 2026 | 3.639 | 8 |
| 2 | 21 July 2026 | 4.118 | 2 |
| 3 | 28 July 2026 | 4.249 | 2 |
| 4 | 4 August 2026 | 4.356 | 2 |
| 5 | 11 August 2026 | 3.517 | 6 |
| 6 | 18 August 2026 | 4.120 | 2 |
| 7 | 25 August 2026 | 4.381 | 4 |
| 8 | 1 September 2026 | 4.264 | 3 |
| 9 | 8 September 2026 | 4.237 | 4 |
| 10 | 15 September 2026 | 4.294 | 5 |
