= The Great British Sewing Bee series 11 =

The Great British Sewing Bee
- Series 11
- Starring: Sara Pascoe (Host); Esme Young (Judge); Patrick Grant (Judge)
- No. of episodes: 10

Release
- Original network: BBC One
- Original release: 15 July – 16 September 2025

Series chronology
- ← Previous; Series 10 Next → Series 12

The eleventh series of The Great British Sewing Bee began on 15 July 2025. Sara Pascoe, who had previously presented the eight and ninth series, returned as the presenter of the show after taking a season off due to maternity leave. Both Esme Young and Patrick Grant returned as the judges. The series consisted of 12 contestants competing to be named the best sewer. The show aired on BBC One. The series was filmed at Sunny Bank Mills, a former textile mill located in Farsley, Leeds. The mill, which was founded in 1829, was a working textile mill until 2008.

== The Sewers ==
| Sewer | Age | Occupation | Place of Residency | Placement |
|---|---|---|---|---|
| Caroline 'Caz' Wilson | 59 | Retired | Staffordshire | 1st |
| Dan Stones | 37 | Stage performer | Durham | 7th |
| Gaynor Mainwaring | 72 | Retired office manager | Port Talbot | 5th |
| Glendora Chase | 59 | Bus driver | Luton | 10th |
| Jessica 'Jess' Harriott-Kerr | 33 | Head of communications | London | 8th |
| Kit Giroux | 24 | Digital marketer | Manchester | 4th |
| Novello Nugée | 66 | Business owner and magistrate | London | 9th |
| Órla Ní Eadhra | 19 | Café worker/student | Inverness | Runner-up |
| Peter Everitt | 45 | Senior pre-construction manager | Devon | 11th= |
| Saffie Pluck | 32 | Lecturer | London | 11th= |
| Stuart Askew | 53 | Premises manager | Herefordshire | 6th |
| Yasmin Proctor-Kent | 30 | Scientist | Gateshead | Runner-up |

== Results and Eliminations ==
| Sewer | 1 | 2 | 3 | 4 | 5 | 6 | 7 | 8 | 9 | 10 |
|---|---|---|---|---|---|---|---|---|---|---|
| Caz | | | WIN | WIN | | WIN | | | | WINNER |
| Órla | | WIN | | | | | | WIN | | RUNNER-UP |
| Yasmin | | | | | | | | | WIN | RUNNER-UP |
| Kit | | | | | | | WIN | WIN | ELIM | |
| Gaynor | | | | | | | | ELIM | | |
| Stuart | | | | | | | ELIM | | | |
| Dan | | | | | WIN | ELIM | | | | |
| Jess | | | | | ELIM | | | | | |
| Novello | | | | ELIM | | | | | | |
| Glendora | | | ELIM | | | | | | | |
| Peter | WIN | ELIM | | | | | | | | |
| Saffie | | ELIM | | | | | | | | |

Sewer won Garment of the Week

One of the judges' favourite sewers

Sewer was safe and got through to next round

One of the judges' least favourite sewers

Sewer was eliminated

== Episodes ==
Sewer eliminated Garment of the Week

=== Episode 1: Shape Week ===
In this episode, Glendora fell ill and did not participate in the Transformation challenge judging and the entire Made-to-measure challenge. No sewer was eliminated, with all twelve progressing through to the next episode.

| Sewer | Pattern Challenge (Tie Front Blouse) | Transformation Challenge (Circle Skirts) | | Made-to-measure (Pleated Dress) |
|---|---|---|---|---|
| Caz | 2 | Batwing Sleeve Blouse | 1 | Denim Dress |
| Dan | 6 | Halter Top and Skirt | 4 | Pleated Disc Dress |
| Gaynor | 3 | Dress | 6 | Day Dress |
| Glendora | 4 | Shorts | 9 | n/a |
| Jess | 11 | Gathered Dress | 12 | 60's Baby Doll Dress |
| Kit | 1 | Gathered Top | 3 | Lightning Bolt Dress |
| Novello | 10 | Ruffled Top | 5 | Halterneck Dress |
| Órla | 5 | Gathered Blouse | 11 | Monochrome Mini Dress |
| Peter | 9 | Trousers with Braces | 7 | Statement Little Black Dress |
| Saffie | 12 | Halter Top | 10 | Custom Printed Dress |
| Stuart | 7 | Gathered Blouse | 8 | A-line Dress |
| Yasmin | 8 | Bow Blouse | 2 | Punky Tartan Mini Dress |

=== Episode 2: Activewear Week ===
In this episode, two sewers were eliminated. For the Transformation Challenge, the sewers were asked to make a party outfit from vintage cycling jerseys. The made-to-measure challenge involved making an athleisure garment, suitable for everyday use.

| Sewer | Pattern Challenge (Seven Panel Cap) | Transformation Challenge (Cycling Jerseys) | | Made-to-measure (Athleisure) |
|---|---|---|---|---|
| Caz | 8 | Purple Floral Dress | 11 | Yellow Tennis Outfit |
| Dan | 3 | Two Piece Outfit | 10 | Athleisure Outfit |
| Gaynor | 6 | Blue Patterned Dress | 5 | Roller Derby Kit |
| Glendora | 11 | Red and Black Dress | 4 | Yoga Class Outfit |
| Jess | 12 | Grey and Pink Two Piece | 8 | Post Work Out Princess |
| Kit | 1 | Colour-blocked Dress | 1 | Mesh Athleisure Wear |
| Novello | 9 | Yellow and Black Dress | 3 | Yoga Cool Down Clothing |
| Órla | 10 | Dress with Godets | 6 | Influencer's Outfit |
| Peter | 2 | Teal and Pink Two Piece | 7 | Skater Boy |
| Saffie | 4 | Blue Top with a Frill | 12 | Combo Climber |
| Stuart | 7 | Yellow Flower Dress | 9 | Tennis Two Piece |
| Yasmin | 5 | Top and Skirt | 2 | Pitch to Pub Outfit |

=== Episode 3: Design Icons Week ===
In the Pattern Challenge, the sewers were asked to make a Diane von Fürstenberg wrap dress.

| Sewer | Pattern Challenge (DVF Wrap Dress) | Transformation Challenge (Vivienne Westwood homage) | | Made-to-measure (Versace) |
|---|---|---|---|---|
| Caz | 1 | Tartan Bustier Dress | 8 | Dorothy-inspired Dress |
| Dan | 7 | Grey Dress with Tartan Ruffles | 5 | J-Lo-inspired Dress |
| Gaynor | 5 | Tartan Trousers & Lace Top | 9 | Cut Out Dress |
| Glendora | 8 | Pale Green Quilted Top and Tweet Skirt | 10 | Pandora Dress |
| Jess | 2 | Pannier Dress | 3 | Beyoncé-inspired Dress |
| Kit | 3 | Black Top and Patterned Gold Dress | 1 | Body Positivity Dress |
| Novello | 9 | Top, Skirt, Cape, and Wig | 6 | Medusa Mini Dress |
| Órla | 6 | Black and Tartan Corset Dress | 7 | Butterfly Outfit |
| Stuart | 10 | Blue Tartan and Yellow Check Dress | 4 | River of Gold Dress |
| Yasmin | 4 | Blue Tartan and Plum Silk Dress | 2 | Harness Dress |

=== Episode 4: Korea Week ===
This week, the judges were joined by renowned Korean fashion designer Eudon Choi. The pattern challenge was to make a traditional short jacket called a jeogori. The made-to-measure challenge was to make a garment based on the cheollik jacket.

| Sewer | Pattern Challenge (Jeodori) | Transformation Challenge (Tae Kwon Do Uniforms) | | Made-to-measure (Cheollik) |
|---|---|---|---|---|
| Caz | 3 | Sleeveless Dress | 2 | Camo Cheollik |
| Dan | 8 | Top and Cut-Out Trousers | 4 | Quilted Cheollik Dress |
| Gaynor | 7 | Striped Dress | 7 | Cheollik Day Dress |
| Jess | 6 | White Dress with Straps | 8 | Checkered Cheollik |
| Kit | 1 | Fan-shaped Dress | 1 | Choellik Jumpsuit |
| Novello | 9 | White Skirt with Red Braces | 9 | Welsh-inspired Cheollik |
| Órla | 5 | 60's Mini Dress | 6 | Cheollik Two Piece |
| Stuart | 4 | Woven Dress | 5 | Trench Coat Cheollik |
| Yasmin | 2 | Paneled Top | 3 | Cheollik Archery Dress |

=== Episode 5: Reduce, Reuse, Recycle Week ===
The episode's first challenge was to make a jacket using a zero-waste pattern design. The transformation challenge was to make a festival outfit using tents that had been rescued from festival campsites. The made-to-measure challenge was inspired by the WWII Make Do and Mend champaign.

| Sewer | Pattern Challenge (Zero-Waste Workwear Jacket) | Transformation Challenge (Festival Tent to Festival Outfit) | | Made-to-measure (Family Occasion Outfit) |
|---|---|---|---|---|
| Caz | 4 | Grey Top and Skirt | 2 | 60th Birthday Party Jumpsuit |
| Dan | 6 | Caped Bikini Ensemble | 1 | Wish Every Day Was Christmas Day |
| Gaynor | 7 | Top with Striped Pants | 5 | Out For A Family Meal Dress |
| Jess | 8 | Dress with Hood and Puff Sleeves | 8 | Summer Barbecue Dress |
| Kit | 1 | Mesh Top with Puffy Dress | 3 | All My Friends' Jeans Dress |
| Órla | 2 | Two-piece with Shoulder Cape | 4 | Christmas Cèilidh Dress |
| Stuart | 5 | Top and Skirt with Pockets | 7 | Menswear Summer Party Dress |
| Yasmin | 3 | Purple Dress with Straps and Ties | 6 | Pop the Champaign Playsuit |

=== Episode 6: Kids Week ===
This week, the judges were joined for the first challenge by fashion designer Victoria Jenkins, who specialises in adaptive clothing. The pattern challenge was to make dungarees. The made-to-measure challenge was to make fancy dress costumes, for nine-year-old children, inspired by what the sewers wanted to be when they were younger.

| Sewer | Pattern Challenge (Adaptive Dungarees) | Transformation Challenge (Maternity Wear to Playwear) | | Made-to-measure (Fancy Dress Costume) |
|---|---|---|---|---|
| Caz | 7 | Lavender Jacket and Trousers | 7 | Fashion Designer |
| Dan | 6 | Pop-star Outfit | 4 | Ringmaster |
| Gaynor | 4 | Plum and Lilac Top and Trousers | 3 | Ballerina |
| Kit | 1 | Striped Jumpsuit | 5 | Elton John-inspired Outfit |
| Órla | 5 | Striped Dress with Tights | 1 | Beekeeper |
| Stuart | 3 | Sunflower-patterned Top and Shorts | 6 | Polar Explorer |
| Yasmin | 2 | Mustard Vest Top and Skort | 2 | Politician |

=== Episode 7: Art Week ===
The pattern challenge was to make a Grayson Perry-inspired baby doll dress. The transformation challenge was to take paint-splattered clothing to make an asymmetric garment. The made-to-measure challenge was to make a garment inspired by the 1960s' Pop art movement.

| Sewer | Pattern Challenge (Grayson Perry-inspired Dress) | Transformation Challenge (Asymmetric Garment) | | Made-to-measure (Pop Art Outfit) |
|---|---|---|---|---|
| Caz | 3 | Khaki One-shoulder Dress | 3 | 2D "Cut Out Doll" Dress |
| Gaynor | 5 | Navy Skirt | 6 | Two-tone A-line Dress |
| Kit | 2 | Grey One-sleeved Top | 2 | Paper Dress |
| Órla | 4 | Asymmetric Pleated Skirt | 1 | Lippy Two Piece |
| Stuart | 6 | One-shoulder Top | 5 | Multi-Coloured Mini Dress |
| Yasmin | 1 | Blue and Grey Ruffled Dress | 4 | Face Cape and Mini Dress |

=== Episode 8: Movie Week ===
The pattern challenge was to make an Edith Head-inspired jacket. The transformation challenge was to make a garment suitable for an awards afterparty, using red velvet cinema curtains. The made-to-measure challenge was to make a costume for a horror film character. Garment of the Week was awarded to two of the made-to-measure costumes, the first time it happened since series 6, episode 6.

| Sewer | Pattern Challenge (Edith Head-inspired Jacket) | Transformation Challenge (Awards Afterparty Garment) | | Made-to-measure (Horror Film Costume) |
|---|---|---|---|---|
| Caz | 4 | Halterneck Mini-dress | 3 | High Priestess |
| Gaynor | 5 | Gathered Dress | 4 | Mari-morgan |
| Kit | 1 | Corset-top Dress | 2 | Scarecrow |
| Órla | 2 | Mini-skirt and Top | 5 | Horror Doll |
| Yasmin | 3 | Multi-pleated Gown | 1 | La Diablesse |

=== Episode 9: 1920s Week ===
The pattern challenge was to make Plus fours trousers. The transformation challenge was to take 1920s-style polo shirts and use them to make a colour-blocked garment. This challenge was won by Kit whose garment paid homage to the Amorphous Dress designed by judge Esme Young, and which was also the pattern challenge in series 8 episode 10. The made-to-measure challenge was to make a garment for a 1920s special event.

| Sewer | Pattern Challenge (Plus Fours) | Transformation Challenge (Colour-blocked Garment) | | Made-to-measure (1920s Special Event) |
|---|---|---|---|---|
| Caz | 3 | Vee-Neck Dress | 3 | Release Day Party Dress |
| Kit | 4 | Amorphous Dress | 1 | Miss Eldorado 1929 |
| Órla | 1 | Swirl Garment | 2 | Flapper Vote Dress |
| Yasmin | 2 | Harlequin Halterneck | 4 | Sailor Dress for a Lesbian Club Night |

=== Episode 10: Final ===
The pattern challenge was to make a bias cut slip dress. The transformation challenge was to make a stylish garment using translucent sheer fabrics. The made-to-measure challenge was to make a Trompe-l'œil garment, which tricks the eye. For this challenge, the live models were finalists' family members.

| Sewer | Pattern Challenge (Bias Cut Slip Dress) | Transformation Challenge (Sheer Fabric Garment) | | Made-to-measure (Trompe-l'œil Garment) |
|---|---|---|---|---|
| Caz | 3 | Geometric Plastic and Lace Dress | 1 | Golden Ribcage Dress |
| Órla | 1 | Dress with Brown Flowers | 2 | Pillars of Colour Dress |
| Yasmin | 2 | Polka-dot Skirt and Top | 3 | Satin and Tulle Illusion Dress |

== Ratings ==
| Episode no. | Airdate | Total viewers (millions) | Weekly ranking all channels |
|---|---|---|---|
| 1 | 15 July 2025 | 4.479 | 2 |
| 2 | 22 July 2025 | 3.720 | 8 |
| 3 | 29 July 2025 | 4.276 | 2 |
| 4 | 5 August 2025 | 4.156 | 2 |
| 5 | 12 August 2025 | 4.219 | 1 |
| 6 | 19 August 2025 | 4.407 | 1 |
| 7 | 26 August 2025 | 4.753 | 2 |
| 8 | 2 September 2025 | 4.264 | 4 |
| 9 | 9 September 2025 | 4.398 | 3 |
| 10 | 16 September 2025 | 4.586 | 3 |
