= The Great British Sewing Bee series 8 =

The Great British Sewing Bee
- Series 8
- Starring: Sara Pascoe (Host); Esme Young (Judge); Patrick Grant (Judge)
- No. of episodes: 10

Release
- Original network: BBC One; BBC Two (final)
- Original release: 27 April – 29 June 2022

Series chronology
- ← Previous; Series 7 Next → Series 9

The eighth series of The Great British Sewing Bee began on 27 April 2022. Sara Pascoe replaced Joe Lycett as the presenter of the show, with both Esme Young and Patrick Grant returning as judges. This series saw the programme moving out of London, it being filmed in a former textile mill called the Sunny Bank Mills, located in Farsley, Leeds. For the first time ever, there were 4 finalists in the final.

== The Sewers ==
Sewer	Age	Occupation	Place of Residency	Placement
Annie Phillips	32	Fashion Buyer	Surrey	Winner
Brogan Sommerville	25	Secondary School Teacher	Leicestershire	Runner-Up
Debra Drake	51	Communication Lead & Personal Assistant	North Wales	Runner-Up
Man Yee Woo	25	Actuary	London	Runner-Up
Cristian Clement	29	Retail Store Manager	Liverpool	5th
Gill Thomas	44	Public Health Intelligence Analyst	Doncaster	6th
Angela Fletcher	63	Health Visitor & School Nurse	Lancashire	7th
Marni Miller	50	Veterinary Surgeon	Devon	8th
Steve Cowling	32	Personal Running Coach	Newcastle	9th
Richy Wedge	34	Baker	Shrewsbury	10th
Chichi O'Malley	23	Research Analyst	Surrey	11th
Mitch Bridgewater	31	Theatre Manager	Cumbria	12th

== Results and Eliminations ==
Sewer	1	2	3	4	5	6	7	8	9	10
Annie						WIN		WIN		Winner
Brogan										Runner-Up
Debra	WIN		WIN		WIN					Runner-Up
Man Yee							WIN			Runner-Up
Cristian								ELIM		
Gill				WIN			ELIM			
Angela						ELIM				
Marni		WIN			ELIM					
Steve				ELIM						
Richy			ELIM							
Chichi		ELIM								
Mitch	ELIM									

Sewer was the series winner

Sewer was the series runner-up

Sewer won Garment of the Week

One of the judges' favourite sewers

Sewer was safe and got through to next round

One of the judges' least favourite sewers

Sewer was eliminated

== Episodes ==
Sewer eliminated Garment of the Week

=== Episode 1: Capsule Wardrobe ===
Sewer	Pattern Challenge (Wool Mini Skirt)	Transformation Challenge (Lounge Wear)		Made-to-measure (Wrap Dress)
Angela	1	Elizabethan Top	11	Summer Wrap Dress
Annie	8	Pink And Purple Top	3	African Floral Print Wrap Dress
Brogan	3	Grey Gathered Top	4	Ruffle Wrap Dress
Chichi	10	Backless Orange Top	6	Open-Back Wrap Dress
Cristian	5	White And Pink Top	5	Flounce Wrap Dress
Debra	4	Grey Wrap Top	10	Ethereal Wrap Dress
Gill	6	Purple Wrap Top	7	Duchess of Cambridge Inspired Wrap Dress
Man Yee	9	Red, Black And White Fringe Top	2	Organza Wrap Dress
Marni	2	Pink 80s Top	1	Flutter Sleeve Wrap Dress
Mitch	12	Dennis the Menace	12	ABBA Inspired Wrap Dress
Richy	7	Orange And Animal Print Too	9	Kimono Inspired Wrap Dress
Steve	11	Green Tie-Fronted top	8	Colour Block Wrap Dress

=== Episode 2: Sports Week ===
Sewer	Pattern Challenge (High Top Trainers)	Transformation Challenge (Netball Gear)		Made-to-measure (Sports Hero Inspired Jacket)
Angela	11	Red And Black Pleated Top	5	Lancashire Cricket Jacket Inspired by Andrew Flintoff
Annie	2	Black, White And Red Pleated Dress	11	Tennis Jacket inspired by Serena Williams
Brogan	7	White, Yellow And Green Dress	1	Team GB jacket inspired by Dame Jess Ennis-Hill
Chichi	9	Red And Black Pleated Dress	8	One-Sleeved Track Jacket inspired by Surya Bonaly and Florence Griffith Joyner
Cristian	8	Teal And Maroon Pleated Top	9	Poolside Jacket inspired by Tom Daley
Debra	6	Blue Pleated Top	2	Welsh rugby jacket inspired by Alun-Wyn Jones
Gill	10	Grey And Maroon Pleated Top	6	Gold Medal Jacket inspired by Nicola Adams
Man Yee	1	Red And Blue Pleated Top	4	Climbing Jacket Inspired by Kim Ja-In
Marni	3	Black Pleated Top	3	Rowing Jacket inspired by Major Heather Stanning
Richy	4	Purple, Black and White Shorts	10	Diving Board Jacket inspired by Tom Daley
Steve	5	Purple And Green Pleated Top	7	80's Print Track Jacket inspired by Florence Griffith Joyner

=== Episode 3: Summer Week ===
Sewer	Pattern Challenge (Shirred Dress)	Transformation Challenge (Hammock)		Made-to-measure (Co-ord set)
Angela	4	Blue Macrame Dress	1	Crop Top Summer Co-Ord
Annie	7	Yellow And Blue Striped Dress	7	African Wax Print Co-Ord
Brogan	1	Striped Top And Skirt	2	Spanish Inspired Summer Co-Ord
Cristian	3	Pink Fringed Jacket	3	Cheese Plant Co-Ord
Debra	8	Blue Tie-Dye Dress	4	Sailing Co-Ord
Gill	6	Bright Striped Dress	8	Shell Top Co-Ord
Man Yee	5	Backless Striped Dress	5	Lemons Bustier Co-Ord
Marni	2	Pink Wrap Dress	9	Ribbed Crop Top Co-Ord
Richy	9	Yellow, Orange And Red Striped Dress	6	Sex in the City Co-Ord
Steve	10	Purple And Green Striped Short Set	10	Tropical Beach Co-Ord

=== Episode 4: Reduce, Reuse and Recycle Week ===
Sewer	Pattern Challenge (Patchwork Jacket)	Transformation Challenge (Coats)		Made-to-measure (Maxi Dress from Duvet Cover)
Angela	7	Polka Dot And Pink Coat	6	Button Front Summer Dress
Annie	5	Leopard Print And Red Coat	2	Seventies Maxi Dress
Brogan	2	Gingham And Pink Coat	3	Nana-Chic Maxi Dress
Cristian	6	Tartan And Aztec Print Coat	5	Family Heirloom Maxi Dress
Debra	1	Green And Purple Cape	9	Big Cat Maxi Dress
Gill	3	Blue And Yellow Coat	4	Chevron Skirt Maxi Dress
Man Yee	8	Pink Quilted Coat	1	Ruffle Dress
Marni	4	Camo And Pink Coat	8	Cross Front Maxi Dress
Steve	9	Green And Pink Jacket	7	Psychedelic Eighties Dress

=== Episode 5: Children's Week ===
Sewer	Pattern Challenge (Sailor Costumes)	Transformation Challenge (School Uniforms)		Made-to-measure (Halloween Costume)
Angela	6	Red And Black Jumpsuit	1	Spider
Annie	8	Purple And Yellow Top And Skirt	6	Dragon
Brogan	4	Grey And Red Dress	4	Umbrella Bat
Cristian	2	Red Sleeveless Hoodie	2	Funny Clown
Debra	5	Blue Playsuit And Waistcoat	7	Miss Havisham
Gill	7	Grey Sleeveless Top And Tracksuit Bottoms	8	Dalek
Man Yee	1	Yellow And Blue Dungarees	3	Spider
Marni	3	Blue Hoodie and Shorts	5	Dark Fairy

=== Episode 6: Music Week ===
Sewer	Pattern Challenge (Parka)	Transformation Challenge (Denim into Country Music)		Made-to-measure (David Bowie Inspired)
Angela	6	Blue Top And Long Denim Skirt	6	Labyrinth Coat Dress
Annie	3	Blue And Red Fringed Dress	7	80's Fashion Blazer Dress
Brogan	1	Tartan Top And Denim Skirt	2	Let's Dance Party Dress
Cristian	2	Yellow Top And Fringed Denim Skirt	3	Ziggy Stardust Catsuit
Debra	4	Denim Two Piece With Frills	4	Ashes to Ashes Trouser Suit
Gill	7	Denim Two Piece With Stars And Fringe	1	Ziggy Flame Dress
Man Yee	5	Blue Fringed Jacket	5	Rebel Rebel Two-Piece

=== Episode 7: Lingerie & Night Wear Week ===
Sewer	Pattern Challenge (Bra and Knicker Set)	Transformation Challenge (Thermals into Going Out)		Made-to-measure (Mens Pyjama Set)
Annie	1	Blue And White Plaited Dress	2	ASAP Rocky Inspired Pyjamas
Brogan	3	Pastel Dress With White Bib	4	Cheeseplant Fabric Pyjamas
Cristian	5	Yellow And Purple Dress	3	Satin Pyjamas
Debra	4	Yellow And Grey Top With Bow	1	Noel Coward Inspired Pyjamas
Gill	6	Pink And Grey Crop Top And Skirt	6	Goldfish Pyjamas
Man Yee	2	Green Camisole With Pastel Lattice	5	Dad Inspired Pyjamas

=== Episode 8: 1930s Week ===
Sewer	Pattern Challenge (Sailor Trousers)	Transformation Challenge (Mens shirts into 1930s Blouses)		Made-to-measure (Bias Cut Dress)
Annie	5	Green And Yellow Blouse	3	Jean Harlow Dress - In Red
Brogan	4	Pastel And Pink Blouse	5	Ginger Rogers Dress
Cristian	2	Green Blouse With Lace Ribbon	4	Stretch Dress
Debra	3	Leopard And Polka Dot Blouse	2	Golden Dress
Man Yee	1	Pink And Orange Blouse	1	Jean Harlow Dress

=== Episode 9: Japanese Week - Semi Final ===
Sewer	Pattern Challenge (Kimono Dress)	Transformation Challenge (Sashiko)		Made-to-measure (Origami)
Annie	1	Blue And Red Star Jacket	2	Origami Bunny Dress
Brogan	3	Skirt With Stars And Pearls	3	Origami Lotus Flower Dress
Debra	4	Pinafore Dress With Red Patches	4	Origami Mount Fuji & Cherry Blossom Dress
Man Yee	2	Skirt With Rainbow, Sun and Lightning	1	Origami Crane Dress

=== Episode 10: Party Week - Final ===
Sewer	Pattern Challenge (Amorphous Dress)	Transformation Challenge (Party Outfit made from scraps from earlier Sewing Bee challenges)		Made-to-measure (Party Jumpsuit)
Annie	3	White Top With Black Belt	2	Metallic Jumpsuit with Bow
Brogan	4	Pink Top And Skirt	4	Leopard Print Playsuit
Debra	1	Red Tiered Dress	3	Multicolour Jumpsuit
Man Yee	2	Blue Lace Up Top	1	Sequin Jumpsuit

== Ratings ==
Episode no.	Airdate	Total viewers (millions)	Weekly ranking all channels
1	27 April 2022	4.80	7
2	4 May 2022	4.88	9
3	11 May 2022	4.84	9
4	18 May 2022	4.57	9
5	25 May 2022	4.75	8
6	1 June 2022	4.42	27
7	8 June 2022	4.85	7
8	15 June 2022	4.72	6
9	22 June 2022	4.79	6
10	29 June 2022	4.49	13
