= The Great British Sewing Bee series 10 =

The Great British Sewing Bee
- Series 10
- Starring: Kiell Smith-Bynoe (Host); Esme Young (Judge); Patrick Grant (Judge)
- No. of episodes: 10

Release
- Original network: BBC One; BBC Two (Week 5)
- Original release: 21 May – 24 July 2024

Series chronology
- ← Previous; Series 9 Next → Series 11

The tenth series of The Great British Sewing Bee began on 21 May 2024 on BBC One. Kiell Smith-Bynoe is the new host of the series, with Esme Young and Patrick Grant returning as judges. The series was again filmed at Sunny Bank Mills, a 19th-century woollen mill located just outside Leeds. Smith-Bynoe has appeared on the show before as a contestant in the 2021 Christmas Special. In this series there are 12 contestants.

== The Sewers ==
Sewer	Age	Place of Residence	Occupation	Placement
Ailsa Lyall	28	Glasgow	Freelance Events Planner	Runner Up
Alex Murphy	32	Derbyshire	Copywriter/Editor	5th
Comfort Smithson	33	Somerset	Self-Employed Designer and Business Manager	11th
Don	84	Cheshire	Retired Research Physicist	9th
Georgie Carter	40	Isle of Wight	Club & Festival DJ	7th
Janet Walton	75	Doncaster	Retired	10th
Lauren Haynes	36	Manchester	Finance Administrator	8th
Luke-Matthew Iveson	33	Manchester	Diversity, Equality, and Inclusion Director	1st
Marcus Holley	30	London	Teaching Assistant & Arts Award Coordinator	6th
Neil Donoghue	52	Leicester	Woodwork Instructor	12th
Pascha Al-Qassab	20	Guildford	Student	Runner Up
Suzy Sankey	28	Liverpool	Waitress	4th

== Results and Eliminations ==
Sewer	1	2	3	4	5	6	7	8	9	10
Luke								WIN		WINNER
Ailsa			WIN		WIN					RUNNER-UP
Pascha						WIN	WIN		WIN	RUNNER-UP
Suzy	WIN								ELIM	
Alex				WIN				ELIM		
Marcus							ELIM			
Georgie		WIN				ELIM				
Lauren					ELIM					
Don				ELIM						
Janet			ELIM							
Comfort		ELIM								
Neil	ELIM									

Sewer was the series winner

Sewer was the series runner-up

Sewer won Garment of the Week

One of the judges' favourite sewers

Sewer was safe and got through to next round

One of the judges' least favourite sewers

Sewer was eliminated

== Episodes ==
Sewer eliminated Garment of the Week

=== Episode 1: Back to Basics Week ===
Sewer	Pattern Challenge (A-line midiskirt)	Transformation Challenge (T-shirt)		Made-to-measure (Casual Day Dress)
Ailsa	8	Multi-panel Cardigan	8	Wrap Dress
Alex	2	Nautical Two Piece	5	Gingham Dress
Comfort	7	Ladder Back Top	2	Cocoon Dress
Don	11	Bra Top and Skirt	10	Godet Dress
Georgie	9	Little Dress	4	Tablecloth Dress
Janet	4	Skirt and Top	3	Garden Party Dress
Lauren	3	Spotty Skirt	11	Maxi Dress
Luke	5	Graphic Top	6	Hand-Painted Utility Dress
Marcus	6	Hat	7	Shirt Dress
Neil	10	Fitted Dress	12	1970's Dress
Pascha	1	Skirt	9	Milkmaid Dress
Suzy	12	A-symetric Top	1	Duvet Dress

=== Episode 2: Sports Week ===
Sewer	Pattern Challenge (Half Zip Fleece)	Transformation Challenge (Top and Bottom from Cricket Whites)		Made-to-measure (Olympic Kit)
Ailsa	9	Torn Apart Set	2	Team Canada Golf Kit
Alex	4	Panelled Floor Length Dress	1	GB Marathon Kit
Comfort	10	Set	10	Ugandan Rugby Kit
Don	8	Scarecrow Set	6	Golfing Two Piece
Georgie	2	Dress	9	Trinidad & Tobago Track Kit
Janet	11	Dress	8	Jazzy Leotard
Lauren	6	Bow Top	7	Sequin Leotard
Luke	3	Piping Dress	4	Spanish Track Kit
Marcus	1	Balaclava	11	Speed Climbing Kit
Pascha	5	Cut Out Dress	5	GB Javelin Kit
Suzy	7	Full Skirt Dress	3	Weightlifting Unitard

=== Episode 3: Travel Week ===
Sewer	Pattern Challenge (Summer Blouse using Tablecloth)	Transformation Challenge (Bag using Nautical Paraphernalia)		Made-to-measure (French Riviera)
Ailsa	1=	Cinch Bag	3	French Riviera Palazzo Pants
Alex	3	Convertible Bag	1	French Riviera Jumpsuit
Don	10	Rucksack	8	French Riviera Sunflower Trousers & Top
Georgie	4	Purse and Bag	4	Beach to Bar Skirt & Top
Janet	8	Boot Bag	10	French Riviera Cocktail Twin Set
Lauren	6	Tote Bag	7	Chic Chiffon Two-Piece
Luke	1=	Whistle Rucksack	2	French Riviera Shirt & Trousers
Marcus	9	Rucksack	9	French Riviera Ruffle Top & Skirt
Pascha	5	Duck Bag	5	Sailor Trousers & Top
Suzy	7	Circle Bag	6	French Riviera Polka Dot Skirt & Top

=== Episode 4: Reduce, Reuse, Recycle Week ===
Sewer	Pattern Challenge (Quilted Bag Using Scraps)	Transformation Challenge (Textile Waste)		Made-to-measure (Repurposed Wedding Dress)
Ailsa	2	Black and white skirt and top	4	Arty Party Dress
Alex	3	Fitted top and Puffa Skirt	6	"Ta Dah" Party Dress
Don	9	Black & Red Top and Skirt	8	Ruffled Party Dress
Georgie	4	Leopard Print Dress	5	Lace Party Dress
Lauren	7	Pink Dress	3	80's Puffball Dress
Luke	5	Champagne Dress	2	80's Power Party Dress
Marcus	6	Multi-Panel Jacket & Shorts	9	Red Carpet Party Outfit
Pascha	1	Dracula Dress	1	Cocktail Party Dress
Suzy	8	Yellow Wrap Skirt and Top	7	"Dance All Night" Party Dress

=== Episode 5: India Week ===
Special Judge for this week Priya Khanchandani. This episode was broadcast on BBC Two due to UEFA Euro 2024 football coverage on BBC One.

Sewer	Pattern Challenge (Nehru Jacket)	Transformation Challenge (Calico and Madras Cotton)		Made-to-measure (Sari Inspired Evening Wear)
Ailsa	4	Shorts Suit	5	Scotland & India - Together at Last
Alex	1	Maxi Dress	8	Red Carpet Glamour Gown
Georgie	6	Multi Gathered Bonanza	1	Green Goddess Sari Dress
Lauren	7	Short Suit	7	Silver Silk Sari Dress
Luke	3	Patchwork Dress	3	Big Drape Drag Dress
Marcus	2	Dress	4	A Dress for Bally
Pascha	5	Frilled Top and Skirt	2	All-In-One Sari Dress
Suzy	8	Dress with Pockets	6	Gold & Green Mini Dress

=== Episode 6: Children's Week ===
Sewer	Pattern Challenge (Child’s Sequined Bomber Jacket)	Transformation Challenge (Animal-themed Fancy Dress for a Toddler from Beach Towels)		Made-to-measure (Outfit from a Childhood Photo)
Ailsa	1	Dalmatian	3	Mum's Mermaid Inspired Party Dess
Alex	2	Lion	2	Party Dungarees & Top
Georgie	5	Butterfly	7	Double Denim Jumpsuit
Luke	7	Fish	5	Bi-Coloured Braces Boilersuit
Marcus	3	Frog	6	Spaceman Jumpsuit
Pascha	4	Crocodile	1	Ra-Ra Skirt & Top
Suzy	6	Swan	4	Granny Patsy's Patchwork Skirt & Top

=== Episode 7: Lingerie Week ===
Sewer	Pattern Challenge (Pyjama Blouse)	Transformation Challenge (Outfit from Shapewear and Lace)		Made-to-measure (Bustier Dress)
Ailsa	5	Black & White Dress	5	Unconventional Dress
Alex	1	Frilly Dress	2	Inside-out Dress
Luke	3	Floor-length Dress	3	Pageant Gown
Marcus	4	Muscle Man Torso	6	Rockstar Skater Chick Dress
Pascha	2	S&M Dress	1	Vintage Gown
Suzy	6	Brown & Black	4	Colourful Jigsaw Dress

=== Episode 8: Diva Week ===
Sewer	Pattern Challenge (Tina Turner Fringed Dress)	Transformation Challenge (Animal Print)		Made-to-measure (Stage Outfit)
Ailsa	2	Lounging Cow Girl	1	Shania Twain Leopard Print Coat
Alex	3	Red and Brown Dressing Gown	2	Orville Peck Canadian Tuxedo
Luke	1	Keyhole Two-piece	5	Lady Gaga Human Motorbike Outfit
Pascha	4	Bikini with see-through shorts	3	Beyonce Mirror Bodysuit
Suzy	5	Green Black & White Two-piece	4	Lady Gaga Opera Coat

=== Episode 9: Design Icons Week ===
Sewer	Pattern Challenge (Cristobal Balenciaga)	Transformation Challenge (Jean Paul Gaultier Ties)		Made-to-measure (Coco Chanel Inspired)
Ailsa	3	Halterneck Top with Woven Back	3	Box Tweed Waistcoat & Organza Skirt
Luke	2	Black & White Dress	1	Little Black Dress
Pascha	1	Pastel Dress	2	1930s Coco Dress
Suzy	4	Game of Thrones Fan Dress	4	Monochrome Dress

=== Episode 10: Final ===
Sewer	Pattern Challenge (Opera Gloves)	Transformation Challenge (Party Paraphernalia)		Made-to-measure (Draped Outfit)
Ailsa	2	Bunting top and skirt	3	'Scotland with a Twist' Two-Piece
Luke	1	Pastel Napkin Dress	2	Monochrome Masc/Femme Gown
Pascha	3	Glittery Silver Dress	1	Hot Pink Ballgown

== Ratings ==
Episode no.	Airdate	Total viewers (millions)	Weekly ranking all channels
1	21 May 2024	4.81	6
2	28 May 2024	4.52	12
3	4 June 2024	4.43	4
4	11 June 2024	4.36	5
5	18 June 2024	3.46	22
6	25 June 2024	3.50	14
7	3 July 2024	4.13	9
8	10 July 2024	3.36	15
9	17 July 2024	4.32	7
10	24 July 2024	4.57	3
