= The Great British Sewing Bee series 7 =

The Great British Sewing Bee
- Series 7
- Starring: Joe Lycett (Host); Esme Young (Judge); Patrick Grant (Judge)
- No. of episodes: 10

Release
- Original network: BBC One
- Original release: 14 April – 16 June 2021

Series chronology
- ← Previous; Series 6 Next → Series 8

The seventh series of The Great British Sewing Bee began on 14 April 2021. Joe Lycett returned as the presenter of the show, with both Esme Young and Patrick Grant returning as the judges. The series consisted of 12 contestants competing to be named the best sewer. The show aired on BBC One and was filmed during the COVID-19 pandemic. The series was filmed at The Chainstore on Trinity Buoy Wharf in London's Docklands, a grade II listed building, built in 1854, and connected to London's only lighthouse.

== The Sewers ==
Sewer	Age	Occupation	Place of Residency	Placement
Serena Baker	21	Medical Student	Edinburgh	Winner
Raph Dilhan	34	Textile Artist	London	Runner Up
Rebecca Grimbleby	23	Customer Assistant	Scunthorpe	Runner Up
Farie Zata	34	Accountant	Dunstable	4th
Damien Wilton	39	IT Installation Director	Bolton	5th
Andrew Aspland	54	Maths Teacher	Hull	6th
Adeena Khatoon	40	Student Engagement Officer	Birmingham	7th
Adam Brooks	31	Cruise Ship Entertainment Director	Leicester	8th
Cathryn Tosler-Waudby	57	Post-Office Worker	Yorkshire	9th
Lawratu Patton	37	Local Authority Officer	Surrey	10th
Jean Gascoigne		Art Psychotherapist	County Down	11th
Julie Pygott	62	Beauty Therapist	Rotherham	12th

== Results and Eliminations ==
Sewer	1	2	3	4	5	6	7	8	9	10
Serena									WIN	Winner
Raph	WIN					WIN				Runner-Up
Rebecca								WIN		Runner-Up
Farie			WIN						OUT	
Damien								OUT		
Andrew							OUT			
Adeena		WIN				OUT				
Adam					OUT					
Cathryn				OUT						
Lawratu			OUT							
Jean		OUT								
Julie	OUT									

Sewer was the series winner

Sewer was the series runner-up

Best Garment: Sewer won Garment of the Week

One of the judges' favourite sewers

Sewer was safe and got through to next round

One of the judges' least favourite sewers

Sewer was eliminated

== Episodes ==
Sewer eliminated Garment of the Week

=== Episode 1: Wardrobe Staples Week ===
Sewer	Pattern Challenge (Shell Top)	Transformation Challenge (T-Shirts)		Made-to-measure (Women's Buffet Dress)
Adam	6	Dress	2	70's Cruise Buffet Dress
Adeena	10	Harem Pants	8	South Asian Buffet Dress
Andrew	5	Dress	1	Crocheted Buffet Dress
Cathryn	9	Child's Skirt	5	Cactus Buffet Dress
Damien	12	Long Skirt	12	Royal Ascot Buffet Dress
Farie	8	Child's Dungarees	3	Chic Buffet Dress
Jean	3	Dress	9	Roomy Buffet Dress
Julie	11	Halter Top	11	Broderie Anglaise Buffet Dress
Lawratu	7	Romper	6	Pocket Buffet Dress
Raph	4	Crop Top	7	Broderie Anglaise Buffet Dress
Rebecca	2	Child's Dress	4	Mum's Buffet Dress
Serena	1	Shorts	10	Ode to Vilanelle Buffet Dress

=== Episode 2: Summer Week ===
Sewer	Pattern Challenge (Paperbag Shorts)	Transformation Challenge (Men's Swimming Gear)		Made-to-Measure (Button Down Sun Dress)
Adam	8	Dress	1	50s Fit and flare Dress
Adeena	9	Busy Dress	3	Two Way Dress
Andrew	3	Orange Stripe Dress	10	40s Contrast Dress
Cathryn	4	Strap Top	4	Key Print Sundress
Damien	6	Fringed Dress	6	Coconut Dress
Farie	5	Neon Dress	8	Summer Shirt Dress
Jean	11	Batwing Top	9	Elegant Floral Dress
Lawratu	10	Sunrise Dress	11	Cross-Back Dress
Raph	1	Rocket Dress	7	Seaside Holiday Dress
Rebecca	7	Asymmetric Skirt	5	Summer Swing Dress
Serena	2	Dress	2	Statement Sleeve Dress

=== Episode 3: Menswear Week ===
Sewer	Pattern Challenge (Baker's Boy Hats)	Transformation Challenge (Men's Suit Jackets)		Made-to-Measure (Man's Utility Jacket)
Adam	3	Back-to-Front Top	2	Navy Jacket
Adeena	9	Strap Top	7	Camouflage Jacket
Andrew	7	Skirt	8	Metal Worker's Jacket
Cathryn	4	Dress	9	Parker Jacket
Damien	10	Skirt	5	Cowboy Jacket
Farie	5	Back-to-Front Top	10	Ankara Jacket
Lawratu	8	Back-to-Front Top	4	Safari Jacket
Raph	1	Dress	3	Overshirt Jacket
Rebecca	6	Dress	6	Raglan Sleeve Jacket
Serena	2	Top	1	Summer Jacket

=== Episode 4: International Week ===
Sewer	Pattern Challenge (French Breton Top)	Transformation Challenge (Sarong)		Made-to-Measure (Frida Kahlo)
Adam	8	Dress	1	'Puff Sleeve' Playsuit
Adeena	5	Kaftan	7	'Kahlo-esque' Lehenga
Andrew	2	Pink Shirt	3	'Traditional Huipil' and Flared Skirt
Cathryn	6	Dress	8	'From Russia With Love' Shift Dress
Damien	3	Dress with Cape	4	'Frida's Self Portrait' Dress
Farie	9	Childs Top/Dress	6	'Broken Column' Dress
Raph	4	Childs Playsuit	5	'Modern Huipil' with Cord Culottes
Rebecca	7	Top and Skirt	2	'Hot Pink' Off-The-Shoulder Outfit
Serena	1	Beach Robe	9	'Smart' Top and Trouser Combo

=== Episode 5: Children's Week ===
Sewer	Pattern Challenge (Romper Suit)	Transformation Challenge (Under the Sea)		Made-to-Measure (Raincoat)
Adam	6	Mermaid	4	Boat Coat
Adeena	8	Rainbow Fish	6	Dinosaur Coat
Andrew	7	Crab	1	Reversible Coat
Damien	5	Mermaid	8	Aquatic Jacket
Farie	3	Shark	7	Unicorn Raincoat
Raph	4	Mermaid	5	French-Guatemalan Coat
Rebecca	2	Octopus	3	Rain-Cloud Coat
Serena	1	Jelly Fish	2	Fun Waterproof

=== Episode 6: Reduce, Reuse and Recycle Week ===
Sewer	Pattern Challenge (Gentleman's Waistcoat)	Transformation Challenge (Army Surplus)		Made-to-Measure (Jeans Dress)
Adeena	7	V-Neck Tunic	7	Paisley Paint Dress
Andrew	3	Poncho	4	Pythagoras Theorem Denim Dress
Damien	6	Cross Straps Dress	5	Family Fabric Denim Dress
Farie	4	Cape	1	Monochrome Dress
Raph	1	Asymmetric Dress	2	Tormented Ocean Dress
Rebecca	5	Dress	6	Patchwork Dress
Serena	2	Halterneck Dress	3	Sporty Colour Block Dress

=== Episode 7: Winter Week ===
Sewer	Pattern Challenge (Men's Flannel Shirt)	Transformation Challenge (Old Scarves)		Made-to-Measure (Festive Winter Party Dress)
Andrew	3	Middle Ages Dress	2	Bow Sleeve Party Dress
Damien	2	Edelweiss Top	6	Zip Up & Down Party Dress
Farie	6	Dress	1	Stretch Velvet Party Dress
Raph	5	Stripy Top	5	Gold Surprise Party Dress
Rebecca	4	Top and Skirt	3	Satin & Lace Party Dress
Serena	1	Medieval Top	4	She's the Boss Party Dress

=== Episode 8: Music of the Movies Week ===
Sewer	Pattern Challenge (Baby from Dirty Dancing Dress)	Transformation Challenge (Curtains to Children's Clothes)		Made-to-Measure (1970s Dream Girls Dress)
Damien	5	Shorts with Braces	4	Foxy Cleopatra
Farie	4	Jumpsuit	5	Elegant Disco Dress
Raph	3	Lederhosen	3	Disco Jumpsuit
Rebecca	2	Dress with a Skort	2	Glamorous Disco Gown
Serena	1	Floral Short Suit	1	Sequinned Sash

=== Episode 9: 1940s Week - Semi-Final ===
Sewer	Pattern Challenge (Oxford Bags - Trousers)	Transformation Challenge (Parachutes to Dresses)		Made-to-Measure (Dior's New Look)
Farie	4	Evening Gown	3	Colour Block Dress
Raph	1	Wedding Gown	2	Space-Age Design
Rebecca	3	Dress	4	Floral Ensemble
Serena	2	Dress	1	Tailored Two-Piece

=== Episode 10: Celebration Week - The Final ===
Sewer	Pattern Challenge (Little Girl's Bridesmaid Dress)	Transformation Challenge (Homeware into Summer Festival Outfit)		Made-to-Measure (Glamorous Off-the-shoulder Evening Gown)
Raph	3	Shorts, top, headdress, and bag	1	Kate-Bush-inspired red 'curtains' dress
Rebecca	2	Skirt and top	3	Floral scuba floor length dress with godet train
Serena	1	Top with trousers attached	2	Acid yellow flounce dress

== Ratings ==
Episode no.	Airdate	Total viewers (millions)	Weekly ranking all channels
1	14 April 2021	6.01	5
2	21 April 2021	5.79	9
3	28 April 2021	5.84	9
4	5 May 2021	5.75	9
5	12 May 2021	6.15	6
6	19 May 2021	5.69	9
7	26 May 2021	5.23	6
8	2 June 2021	5.62	2
9	9 June 2021	5.92	2
10	16 June 2021	6.07	5
