= The Great British Sewing Bee series 9 =

The Great British Sewing Bee
- Series 9
- Starring: Sara Pascoe (Host); Esme Young (Judge); Patrick Grant (Judge)
- No. of episodes: 10

Release
- Original network: BBC One
- Original release: 24 May – 26 July 2023

Series chronology
- ← Previous; Series 8 Next → Series 10

The ninth series of The Great British Sewing Bee began on 24 May 2023 on BBC One. As with series 8, Sara Pascoe hosts, with Esme Young and Patrick Grant returning as judges. Guest judge for episode three was Banke Kuku. There were 12 contestants in season 9.

== The sewers ==
Sewer	Age	Place of residence	Occupation	Placement
Asmaa Al-Allak	46	Cardiff	Breast surgeon	1st
Catherine Woolley	34	West Sussex	Computer games designer	12th
Fauve Birch	26	Swansea	Trainee solicitor	7th
Gillie Ford	73	Nottingham	Retired	11th
Lauren Tedstone	30	Midlands	Fabric shop worker	5th
Lizzie Everard	49	Bristol	Graphic designer and animator	6th
Maria Garcia	34	Fife	Accident and emergency nurse	10th
Matthew Dummigan	30	Peterborough	Teaching assistant	9th
Mia Bleach	20	Surrey	Costume design student	Runner-up
Tony Rea	53	Cornwall	Postman	Runner-up
Tony White	33	Essex	Primary school teacher	8th
Vicki Reid	30	Lincolnshire	Police dispatcher	4th

== Results and eliminations ==
Sewer	1	2	3	4	5	6	7	8	9	10
Asmaa							WIN	WIN	WIN	WINNER
Mia		WIN		WIN						RUNNER-UP
Tony R						WIN				RUNNER-UP
Vicki									ELIM	
Lauren								ELIM		
Lizzie			WIN				ELIM			
Fauve					WIN	ELIM				
Tony W	WIN				ELIM					
Matthew				ELIM						
Maria			ELIM							
Gillie		ELIM								
Catherine	ELIM									

Sewer was the series winner

Sewer was the series runner-up

Sewer won Garment of the Week

One of the judges' favourite sewers

Sewer was safe and got through to next round

One of the judges' least favourite sewers

Sewer was eliminated

== Episodes ==
Sewer eliminated Garment of the Week

=== Episode 1: Classics with a twist ===
Sewer	Pattern Challenge (Twist Top)	Transformation Challenge (Corporate Uniform to Personality Garment)		Made-to-measure (Cut Out Dress)
Asmaa	1	Skirt and Top	6	Open Back Cut-Out Dress
Catherine	12	Cat Peek Dress	5	Sateen Cut-Out Dress
Fauve	5	Pink Top	9	Floral Cut-Out Dress
Gillie	11	Floral Outfit	4	Cut-Out Sundress
Lauren	6	Dress	7	Linen Cut-Out Dress
Lizzie	10	Gathered Outfit	3	Dior-Inspired Cut-Out Dress
Maria	8	Blue Tunic Top	12	Broderie Anglaise Cut-Out Dress
Matthew	3	Bondage Shirt	1	Harness Cut-Out Dress
Mia	7	Yellow Top	8	Cut-Out Mini Dress
Tony R	2	Shorts	11	Rockabilly Cut-Out Dress
Tony W	9	Waistcoat	10	Stretch Fabric Cut-Out Dress
Vicki	4	Orange Sleeve Top	2	1980s Cut-Out Dress

=== Episode 2: Travel Week ===
Sewer	Pattern Challenge (Rucksack)	Transformation Challenge (Windbreak to Rainwear)		Made-to-measure (Swimsuit)
Asmaa	2	Jacket & Skirt	1	Marilyn Monroe Inspired Swimsuit
Fauve	5	Wrap Coat	9	Wild Swimming Costume
Gillie	11	Patriotic Coat	7	South of France Inspired Swimsuit
Lauren	4	Frilled Cape	5	Belted Swimsuit
Lizzie	10	Loop Cape	10	Frilly Ruffle Swimsuit
Maria	6	Alien Vs Predator	8	Retro Inspired Swimsuit
Matthew	8	Giant Hood Coat	4	Transgender Flag Swimsuit
Mia	9	Bow Top	6	Puff Sleeve Swimsuit
Tony R	3	Red and yellow stripe coat	3	Cornish Sea Swimsuit
Tony W	7	Pink Binding Coat	2	Halterneck Swimsuit
Vicki	1	All in one	11	Sun Safe Swimsuit

=== Episode 3: West Africa ===
Sewer	Pattern Challenge (Batakari)	Transformation Challenge (Adire Fabric)		Made-to-measure (Boubou)
Asmaa	1		6	Jellabiya Boubou
Fauve	10		8	Fringed Boubou
Lauren	5	Grecian Goddess	2	Fans Boubou
Lizzie	8	Spotty asymmetrical dress	1	Colour Block Boubou
Maria	4	purple dress	10	Chiffon Boubou
Matthew	6		7	Man's Boubou
Mia	9		4	Puffy Ruffly Boubou
Tony R	3	red halterneck	9	Flounce Boubou
Tony W	7		3	Billowing Boubou
Vicki	2		5	Midi Boubou

=== Episode 4: Reduce, Reuse, Recycle ===
Sewer	Pattern Challenge (Zero Waste Trousers)	Transformation Challenge (Tote Bag to Garment)	Made-to-measure (Crochet Blanket Outfit)
Asmaa	1	1	Flower Power Coat
Fauve	8	6	Swinging 60's Dress
Lauren	5	9	Culotte & Crop Top Set
Lizzie	6	2	Striped Dress & Hooded Bomber
Matthew	7	5	Nan's A-Line Dress
Mia	3	3	Box Jacket & Mini Skirt
Tony R	9	4	Festival Two Piece
Tony W	4	7	Stripes & Chevron Two Piece
Vicki	2	8	Bohemian Dress

=== Episode 5: Art Week ===
	Pattern Challenge (Modernist Skirt)	Transformation Challenge (Painting into Dress)		Made-to-measure (Surrealist Dress)
Asmaa	2	Nautilus Shell Top	1	Cream Dress
Fauve	4		4	Architectural Dress
Lauren	7	Dark Armour Dress	2	Illusion Shirt Dress
Lizzie	1		5	Ode to Picasso
Mia	6		3	Cloud Dress
Tony R	5	Blue & White Top	6	This is a Dress
Tony W	8	Blue Jacket	8	Gothic Bridal Gown
Vicki	3	V-Neck Top	7	Dali Inspired Outfit

=== Episode 6: Children's Week ===
	Pattern Challenge (Dragon Dressing Gown)	Transformation Challenge (Denim Jacket)		Made-to-measure (Party Dress)
Asmaa	2	Black Jacket with Neon Twists	7	Aqua Birthday Party Dress
Fauve	7	Stars & Tulle Jacket	5	Floral Jumpsuit
Lauren	3	Patchwork Jacket	6	Sunday Best Dress
Lizzie	1	Soviet Cosmonaut Jacket	1	Waistcoat & Tiered Skirt
Mia	5	Frilled Sleeveless Jacket	4	Christmas Party Dress
Tony R	6	Dinosaur Camo Jacket	2	Neoprene Party Dress
Vicki	4	Hearts & Lace Jacket	3	Princess Party Dress

=== Episode 7: Nineties Week ===
	Pattern Challenge (Cargo Pants)	Transformation Challenge (90's Icon Fancy Dress Costume)		Made-to-measure (90's Supermodel Dress)
Asmaa	2	Jennifer Lopez	6	Boned Bustier
Lauren	4	Scary Spice	1	Bias Cut Slip Dress
Lizzie	6	Lady Raver @ Prodigy Gig	5	Liquid Gold Slip Dress
Mia	5	Madonna	2	Liz Hurley Inspired Dress
Tony R	3	Ginger Spice Dress	3	Body Con Dress
Vicki	1	Ginger Spice 2 Piece	4	Satin Corset Dress

=== Episode 8: Fashion Icons Week ===
	Pattern Challenge (Breakfast at Tiffany's Dress)	Transformation Challenge (Shower Curtains)		Made-to-measure (Smoking Jacket)
Asmaa	1	Bikini with Bolero & Skirt	4	Purple Velvet Smoking Jacket
Lauren	5	Halter Neck Clear Dress	2	Chenille Smoking Jacket
Mia	2	Stars Cocktail Dress	1	Harry Styles Jacquared Jacket
Tony R	4	Bondage Skirt with Cape	5	Willy Wonka Purple Cordury Jacket
Vicki	3	Frilled Yellow Dress	3	Rainforest Pocketless Jacket

=== Episode 9: Utilitarian Week ===
	Pattern Challenge (Military Trench Coat)	Transformation Challenge (Cleaning Products)		Made-to-measure (Boilersuit)
Asmaa	1	Carnival top with Scourer Pom-Poms	3	Rock Chick Boilersuit
Mia	3	Rubber gloves Dress	2	Floral Boilersuit for Mum
Tony R	2	Tabard & Mops dress	4	Camo Boilersuit
Vicki	4	Checkerboard Scourer Pleated Top	1	Orange is the New Black Boilersuit

=== Episode 10: The Final ===
	Pattern Challenge (Victorian Style Evening Dress)	Transformation Challenge (Girl's Party Wear into Men's Red Carpet Glamour)		Made-to-measure (Met-Gala Two-In-One Dress)
Asmaa	2	Black & Silver Spectacular	1	Blue Shift Dress/Emerald Gown with Bow
Mia	1	David Bowie Skort	3	Little Black Dress/Pink Glitter Gown
Tony R	3	70's Collar with Pink Cravat	2	Puffball Dress/Psychedelic Fishtail Dress

== Ratings ==
Episode no.	Airdate	Total viewers (millions)	Weekly ranking all channels
1	24 May 2023	4.60	7
2	31 May 2023	4.14	15
3	7 June 2023	4.08	9
4	14 June 2023	4.19	5
5	21 June 2023	4.37	4
6	28 June 2023	4.43	4
7	5 July 2023	4.39	4
8	12 July 2023	4.08	8
9	19 July 2023	4.49	6
10	26 July 2023	4.93	3
