= The Great British Sewing Bee series 5 =

The Great British Sewing Bee
- Series 5
- No. of episodes: 8

Release
- Original network: BBC Two
- Original release: 12 February – 2 April 2019

Series chronology
- ← Previous; Series 4 Next → Series 6

The fifth series of The Great British Sewing Bee began on 12 February 2019 following a three-year hiatus. Joe Lycett replaced Claudia Winkleman as the presenter of the show, with both Esme Young and Patrick Grant returning as judges. The series was shot at 47-49 Tanner Street, Bermondsey, though the exterior shots are of 1 Tanner Street.

== Sewers ==
Sewer	Age	Occupation	Hometown	Placement
Juliet Uzor	33	Primary School Teacher	London	Winner
Leah Nicholls	43	Practice Director of an Architectural Firm	London	Runner-Up
Riccardo Guido	37	Graphic Designer/Multimedia Producer	Lecce, Italy / East London	Runner-Up
Jen Hogg	49	Self-employed	Glasgow	4th Place
Janet Poole	70	Retired Shopkeeper	Beadlam, North Yorkshire	5th Place
Mercedes Ferrari-Plumridge	57	School Reprographics Technician	East Sussex	6th Place
Alexei Winter	36	Manufacturing Engineer	Leeds	7th Place
Ben Moore	31	Scientist	Edinburgh	8th Place
Sheila Elizabeth Hall	51	Integrated Care Liaison Officer	Ilford, Essex	9th Place
Tom Jones	27	Motion Graphic Designer	Chelmsford, Essex	10th Place

== Results and Eliminations ==
Sewer	1	2	3	4	5	6	7	8
Juliet	BG				BG			Winner
Leah		BG						Runner-Up
Riccardo						BG		Runner-Up
Jen				BG			OUT	
Janet						OUT		
Mercedes			BG		OUT			
Alexei				OUT				
Ben			OUT					
Sheila		OUT						
Tom	OUT							

Sewer was the series winner

Sewer was the series runner-up

Best Garment: Sewer won "Garment of the Week"

One of the judge's favourite sewers

Sewer was safe and got through to next round

One of the judge's least favourite sewers

Sewer was eliminated

== Episodes ==
Sewer eliminated Garment of the Week

=== Episode 1: Cotton Week ===
Sewer	Pattern Challenge (Wiggle Dress)	Alteration Challenge (Denim)		Made-to-measure (Cotton Jumpsuit)
Alexei	7	Skirt	2	Military Jumpsuit
Ben	2	Top	6	Cropped Jumpsuit
Janet	9	Dress	4	Nautical Jumpsuit
Jen	3	Halter Neck Dress	1	Denim Piping Jumpsuit
Juliet	1	Off the Shoulder Top	10	Asymmetric Jumpsuit
Leah	10	Dress	5	Peacock Print Jumpsuit
Mercedes	6	Dress	9	Mustard Denim Jumpsuit
Riccardo	8	Top	8	80s-style Wrap Jumpsuit
Sheila	4	Top	3	Monochrome Jumpsuit
Tom	5	Mini Dress	7	Pop Art Jumpsuit

=== Episode 2: Children's Week ===
Sewer	Pattern Challenge (Child's Hoodie)	Alteration Challenge (Fake Fur)		Made-to-measure (Child's Dance Outfit)
Alexei	7	Cheetah Outfit	4	Forest Fairy Dance Outfit
Ben	9	Ant Outfit	1	Contemporary Dance Outfit
Janet	1	Cat Outfit	3	Sailor's Hornpipe Dance Outfit
Jen	2	Exotic Bird Outfit	2	Highland Dance Outfit
Juliet	5	Bee/Wolf Outfit	7	Igbo Cultural Dance Outfit
Leah	4	Superhero Cheetah Outfit	5	Black and White 'Swan Lake' Dance Outfit
Mercedes	3	Princess Sunshine Outfit	8	80s Street Dance Outfit
Riccardo	6	Dragon Outfit	6	Tarantella Dance Outfit
Sheila	8	Carnival Queen Outfit	9	Sparkling Street Dance Outfit

=== Episode 3: 70s Week ===
The sewers' machines were replaced by vintage machines from the 1970s that they used the whole week.

Sewer	Pattern Challenge (Flared Jeans)	Alteration Challenge (Tartan Garments)		Made-to-measure (Maxi Dress)
Alexei	7	Punk Tartan Outfit	8	Satin-Lined Maxi Dress
Ben	8	Punk Tartan Outfit	4	Mushroom Maxi Dress
Janet	5	Punk Tartan Outfit	7	Ditsy Print Maxi Dress
Jen	1	Punk Tartan Outfit	2	Lee Bender Maxi Dress
Juliet	4	Punk Tartan Outfit	6	'Flouncy' Maxi Dress
Leah	3	Punk Tartan Outfit	5	Sheer Maxi Dress
Mercedes	6	Punk Tartan Outfit	3	1973 Maxi Dress
Riccardo	2	Punk Tartan Outfit	1	Tiered Crepe Maxi Dress

=== Episode 4: Technical Fabric Week ===
Sewer	Pattern Challenge (Swimming Costume)	Alteration Challenge (Tent)		Made-to-measure (Tracksuit)
Alexei	7	Hooded Dog Coat	4	Active Outdoor Tracksuit
Janet	2	Strapped Dog Coat	6	Baseball Tracksuit
Jen	3	Camouflage Dog Coat	1	Minimalist Scuba Tracksuit
Juliet	1	Caped 'Sherlock Holmes' Dog Coat	2	Camo Scuba Tracksuit
Leah	5	Grey and Mint Dog Coat	5	Lightweight Shell Suit
Mercedes	6	Pink Dog Coat	3	Yoke-Stripe Tracksuit
Riccardo	4	Dog Coat with Handle	7	80s Scuba Tracksuit

=== Episode 5: Reduce, Reuse, and Recycle Week ===
Sewer	Pattern Challenge (Pussy Bow Blouse)	Alteration Challenge (Offcuts From Last Four Weeks)		Made-to-measure (Day Dress)
Janet	2	Patchwork Reversible Waterproof Jacket	1	Boned Curtains Day Dress
Jen	3	Panelled Skirt	5	Floral Curtains Day Dress
Juliet	1	Crop Top and Skirt	3	Net Curtains Day Dress
Leah	5	Child's Dress	4	Stripy Blinds Day Dress
Mercedes	6	Mini Dress	6	Sci-Fi Curtains Day Dress
Riccardo	4	Patchwork Dress	2	Charity's Curtains Day Dress

N.B In the alteration challenge, the sewers were given a bin filled with the offcuts from the fabric they used over the last four weeks; the bins were tipped out so that the sewers had access to everyone who was still in the competition's offcuts from the previous weeks.

=== Episode 6: British and Irish Fabric Week ===
Sewer	Pattern Challenge (Linen Worker's Jacket)	Alteration Challenge (Deckchair and Parasol)		Made-to-measure (British Woollen Coat)
Janet	4	Top and Rah-Rah Skirt	5	London Landmarks Wool Coat
Jen	1	Skirt and Top	2	Harris Tweed 60s Swing Coat
Juliet	2	A-line Mini Dress	4	Camel Wool Mid-length Coat
Leah	5	Skirt and Top	1	Camel Wool 60s Swing Coat
Riccardo	3	Knickerbockers and Top	3	Harris Tweed 70s Cropped Coat

=== Episode 7: World Sewing Week ===
Sewer	Pattern Challenge (Indian Dhoti Pants)	Alteration Challenge (Dashiki)		Made-to-measure (Origami Top)
Jen	1	Shorts and Shirt	4	Puzzle Pattern Origami Top
Juliet	2	Off the Shoulder Top and Skirt	2	Spiral Origami Top
Leah	4	Plaited Skirt Dress	1	Spots and Stripes Origami Top
Riccardo	3	Plaited Front Dress	3	'Ode to Bjork' Origami Top

=== Episode 8: Special Occasion Week ===
Sewer	Pattern Challenge (Double Breasted Waistcoat)	Alteration Challenge (Net Curtains)		Made-to-measure (Strapless Evening Gown)
Juliet	1	Big Bow and Draped Skirt Dress	2	Asymmetric Strapless Evening Gown
Leah	2	Big Bow Long Flowing Dress	1	'Magic' Strapless Evening Gown
Riccardo	3	Green and White Dress	3	Jellyfish Trap Strapless Evening Gown

== Ratings ==
Episode no.	Airdate	Total viewers (millions)	Weekly ranking all channels
1	12 February 2019	3.79	48
2	19 February 2019	—	—
3	26 February 2019	3.66	47
4	5 March 2019	—	—
5	12 March 2019	—	—
6	19 March 2019	3.66	47
7	26 March 2019	3.63	40
8	2 April 2019	3.81	39
