= Victoria Jenkins =

British adaptive fashion designer

Victoria Jenkins is a British adaptive fashion designer and disability activist. She is the founder of the adaptive fashion range Unhidden.

== Biography ==
Jenkins studied at the London Istituto Marangoni, graduating in 2008. She worked in the fashion industry as a garment technologist for clothing brands including AllSaints, Jack Wills, Primark, Tesco and Victoria Beckham. Jenkins became a disability activist after undergoing surgery for a burst stomach ulcer in 2012 and living with chronic pain.

Jenkins founded the brand Unhidden, an adaptive fashion range for people with disabilities in 2016. The brand uses deadstock fabrics and has adaptive features such as elasticated waistbands and hidden access zips. When Jenkins sought investment on Dragon's Den, she was rejected for investment.

In 2021, Jenkins published The Little Book of Ableism, described as resource and guide for the 15% of people who live with a disability.

In 2023, Unhidden became the first adaptive fashion range to show at London Fashion Week. It is also the first adaptive brand to become a member of the British Fashion Council (BFC). Also in 2023, Jenkins launched a capsule collection with Lucy & Yak.

In 2024, she collaborated with Primark for an affordable adaptive fashion range. She has also worked with disability activist Shani Dhanda to expand her collection.

In 2025, Jenkins was a guest judge during week six of the BBC television sewing competition The Great British Sewing Bee. She is a judge for the Victoria & Albert's (V&A) National School Challenge.

She is an ambassador for Purple Tuesday and Models of Diversity.
