= The Great British Sewing Bee series 6 =

The Great British Sewing Bee
- Series 6
- Starring: Joe Lycett (Host); Esme Young (Judge); Patrick Grant (Judge)
- No. of episodes: 10

Release
- Original network: BBC One
- Original release: 22 April – 24 June 2020

Series chronology
- ← Previous; Series 5 Next → Series 7

The sixth series of The Great British Sewing Bee began on 22 April 2020. Joe Lycett returned as the presenter of the show with both Esme Young and Patrick Grant returning as the judges. The series consisted of 12 contestants competing to be named the best sewer. For series six, the show moved from BBC Two to BBC One and increased from eight episodes to 10, becoming the channel's top rated show during its run.

== The Sewers ==
Sewer	Age	Occupation	Place of Residency	Placement
Clare	37	Hospital Doctor	Winchester	Winner
Matt	43	Playout Supervisor	London	Runner-Up
Nicole	42	Jewellery Designer	London	Runner-Up
Liz	37	Product Manager	Middlesbrough	4th
Mark	42	Personal Banker	Kenilworth	5th
Therese	64	Semi-retired Teacher	East Sussex	6th
Peter	40	Deputy Manager, Youth Hostel	Brighton	7th
Ali	48	Paramedic	West Yorkshire	8th
Hazel	26	Charity Worker	Kent	9th
Fiona	56	House Person	Renfrewshire	10th
Alex	24	Student	Gloucestershire	11th
Angillia	62	Retired Primary School Teacher	West Yorkshire	12th

== Results and Eliminations ==
Sewer	1	2	3	4	5	6	7	8	9	10
Clare									WIN	Winner
Matt	WIN					WIN				Runner-up
Nicole						WIN				Runner-up
Liz									OUT	
Mark		WIN						OUT		
Therese			WIN		WIN		OUT			
Peter						OUT				
Ali				WIN	OUT					
Hazel				OUT						
Fiona			OUT							
Alex		OUT								
Angillia	OUT									

Sewer was the series winner

Sewer was the series runner-up

Best Garment: Sewer won Garment of the Week

One of the judges' favourite sewers

Sewer was safe and got through to next round

One of the judges' least favourite sewers

Sewer was eliminated

== Episodes ==
Sewer eliminated Garment of the Week

=== Episode 1: Wardrobe Staples Week ===
Sewer	Pattern Challenge (Wrap Skirt)	Alteration Challenge (Men's Office Shirt)		Made-to-measure (Tea Dress)
Alex	10	Mini Dress	9	Dancefloor Tea Dress
Ali	3	A-line Mini Skirt	7	Country Fair Tea Dress
Angillia	7	Frilled Tunic	12	Elegant Tea Dress
Clare	9	Halter Neck Dress	3	40s Floral Tea Dress
Fiona	4	Skirt	10	Floral Ruffle Tea Dress
Hazel	11	Pleated Skirt	6	African Wax Print Tea Dress
Liz	6	Corset	5	90s Ditsy Grunge Tea Dress
Mark	5	Skirt	11	Flower Power Tea Dress
Matt	8	Skirt	4	Prim and Proper Tea Dress
Nicole	12	Fringe Skirt	2	Caribbean Carnival Tea Dress
Peter	1	Dress	1	Festival Tea Dress
Therese	2	Sleeveless Tunic	8	50s Swirly Tea Dress

=== Episode 2: Holiday Week ===
Sewer	Pattern Challenge (Palazzo Pants)	Alteration Challenge (Towels)		Made-to-measure (Summer Holiday Shirt)
Alex	7	Wrap Top	10	Chest Appeal Holiday Shirt
Ali	1	Rah-Rah Skirt	5	Festival Holiday Shirt
Clare	2	Beach Cover-Up	8	Peruvian Holiday Short
Fiona	11	Beach Cover-Up	9	1950s Style Holiday Shirt
Hazel	9	Beach Cover-Up	3	African Wax Print Holiday Shirt
Liz	6	Tunic	6	Koi Carp Holiday Shirt
Mark	4	Beach Cover-Up	7	Tropical Holiday Shirt
Matt	5	Short Skirt	11	Ode to Frida Holiday Shirt
Nicole	10	Shorts Suit	2	Shirt-Jac Holiday Shirt
Peter	8	Beach Cover-Up	1	Contemporary Holiday Shirt
Therese	3	Dress	4	Parrot Fashion Holiday Shirt

=== Episode 3: Children's Week ===
Sewer	Pattern Challenge (Child's Smocked Dress)	Alteration Challenge (Sleeping Bag)		Made-to-measure (Dungarees)
Ali	3	Pepperoni Pizza Outfit	5	Decorator's Dungarees
Clare	9	Watermelon Wedge Outfit	2	Safari Dungarees
Fiona	6	Watermelon Outfit	9	Geometric Print Dungarees
Hazel	4	Cheese Burger Outfit	6	Cosmic Dungarees
Liz	2	Pumpkin Outfit	7	Shorty Star Dungarees
Mark	7	Packet of Crisps Outfit	4	Flash of Flamingo Dungarees
Matt	1	Apple Outfit	10	Mustard Dungarees
Nicole	5	Carrot Outfit	8	Nautical Dungarees
Peter	8	Sushi Outfit	3	Utility Dungarees
Therese	10	Purple Grapes Outfit	1	Summer Dungarees

=== Episode 4: Sports Week ===
Sewer	Pattern Challenge (Rugby Shirt)	Alteration Challenge (Cagoule)		Made-to-measure (Tennis Outfit)
Ali	5	Zigzag Toddler's Onesie	8	Bold Floral Tennis Outfit
Clare	2	Rainbow Toddler's Onesie	3	Science Nerd Tennis Outfit
Hazel	7	Pink Cape Toddler's Onesie	4	1970's Cotton Poplin Tennis Outfit
Liz	9	Turquoise and Black Toddler's Onesie	9	Punky Tennis Outfit
Mark	3	Neon Stripe Toddler's Onesie	5	Vintage (With a Twist) Tennis Outfit
Matt	4	Leopard Print Toddler's Onesie	7	1980's Neon Tennis Outfit
Nicole	1	Animal Print Toddler's Onesie	2	Retro Towelling Tennis Outfit
Peter	8	Polka Dot Toddler's Onesie	6	Multi-Purpose Tennis Outfit
Therese	6	Floral Toddler's Onesie	1	All-Black Tennis Outfit

=== Episode 5: Lingerie and Sleepwear Week ===
Sewer	Pattern Challenge (Boned Basque)	Alteration Challenge (Nightie and Pajamas)		Made-to-measure (Sleep Set)
Ali	6	Skating Outfit	6	Leopard Print Sleep Set
Clare	1	Dress	4	1940's Peekaboo Sleep Set
Liz	3	Maxi Dress	8	Comfy Goth Sleep Set
Mark	4	Skirt	5	Winceyette Sleep Set
Matt	5	Dress	3	Silky and Sensual Sleep Set
Nicole	2	Dungarees	1	Baby Doll Sleep Set
Peter	8	Bolero Jacket	2	Abstract Cotton Sleep Set
Therese	7	Blouse	7	Floral Cotton Sleep Set

=== Episode 6: Reduce, Reuse, and Recycle Week ===
Sewer	Pattern Challenge (Men's Bomber Jacket)	Alteration Challenge (Laundry Bags)		Made-to-measure (Winter Dress)
Clare	2	Skirt	5	1920s Puffin Winter Dress
Liz	3	Bell-Shaped Skirt	3	Panelled Chevron Winter Dress
Mark	1	Trench Coat	6	Asymmetric Winter Dress
Matt	5	Dress with Train	7	Multi-Panelled Skirt Winter Dress
Nicole	6	Jacket	4	Stripy Puzzle Winter Dress
Peter	7	Dress	1	Wicked Witch Winter Dress
Therese	4	Bell-Shaped Dress	2	Twisted Jumper Winter Dress

In the Made-to-Measure Challenge, the sewers all had to make their winter dresses from recycled knitwear. For the first time, the judges could not agree and chose two Garments of the Week.

=== Episode 7: 1980's Week ===
Sewer	Pattern Challenge (Power Jacket)	Alteration Challenge (High-Vis Safety Wear)		Made-to-measure (80's Cocktail Dress)
Clare	2	Cone Bra Top and Ruffled Skirt	1	80s Puffball Cocktail Dress
Liz	3	Green Puff Skirt Dress	5	80s Cartoon Hero Cocktail Dress
Mark	4	Top and Shorts	2	Vintage 80s Cocktail Dress
Matt	1	Strapless Top and Skirt	4	80s Soap Opera Diva Cocktail Dress
Nicole	5	Off-the-shoulder Top and Skirt	3	80s Split and Shimmer Cocktail Dress
Therese	6	Top and 'Bucks Fizz' Skirt	6	80s Black and Gold Cocktail Dress

=== Episode 8: World Sewing Week ===
Sewer	Pattern Challenge (Terno Blouse)	Alteration Challenge (Provencal Tablecloth)		Made-to-measure (Flamenco Skirt)
Clare	1	Child's Dress	1	Formal Curtain Flamenco Skirt
Liz	3	Kimono	2	Gothic Flamenco Skirt
Mark	5	Jacket	4	Wrap Flamenco Skirt
Matt	2	Women's Beach Set	3	Modern Scuba Flamenco Skirt
Nicole	4	Frilled Culottes	5	Global Flamenco Skirt

=== Episode 9: Movie Week ===
Sewer	Pattern Challenge (Pleated Halterneck Dress)	Alteration Challenge (Sci-Fi 'Scrap' and Garments)		Made-to-measure (Flapper Dress)
Clare	2	Copper Tubing Dress	1	Three Layer Art Deco Flapper Dress
Liz	4	Leather-Studded Sleeve Dress	4	Cobweb Crossover Flapper Dress
Matt	1	'Barbarella' Dress	3	Vintage New York Flapper Dress
Nicole	3	Black and Silver Collar Dress	2	Silk, Feather, and Gold Flapper Dress

=== Episode 10: Celebration Week ===
Sewer	Pattern Challenge (Boy's Kilt)	Alteration Challenge (Swimsuit and Prom Dress)		Made-to-measure (Evening Gown)
Clare	1	Purple Wings Carnival Outfit	2	1930s Hollywood Red Carpet Gown
Matt	3	Upside-down Bodice Carnival Outfit	3	Leather and Gold Red Carpet Gown
Nicole	2	Sparkly Blue Carnival Outfit	1	Feathers and Bling Red Carpet Gown

== Ratings ==
Episode no.	Airdate	Total viewers (millions)	Weekly ranking all channels
1	22 April 2020	6.01	13
2	29 April 2020	5.68	24
3	6 May 2020	5.94	16
4	13 May 2020	5.66	11
5	20 May 2020	6.00	7
6	29 May 2020	6.02	5
7	3 June 2020	6.06	7
8	10 June 2020	6.25	6
9	17 June 2020	6.18	7
10	24 June 2020	5.99	4
