= The Great British Sewing Bee =

British television sewing competition

- Genre: Reality; Game show
- Presented by: Claudia Winkleman; Joe Lycett; Sara Pascoe; Kiell Smith-Bynoe; Sophie Willan
- Judges: Patrick Grant; May Martin; Esme Young
- Theme music composer: Ian Livingstone
- Country of origin: United Kingdom
- Original language: English
- No. of series: 12
- No. of episodes: 97 (plus 9 specials)

Production
- Executive producer: Anna Beattie
- Producers: Susanne Rock; Suzanne McGairl
- Production locations: Other Cafe and Gallery; Metropolitan Wharf; Bermondsey; Sunny Bank Mills
- Editor: Susanne Rock
- Running time: 60 minutes
- Production company: Love Productions

Original release
- Network: BBC Two
- Release: 2 April 2013 – 2 April 2019
- Network: BBC One
- Release: 22 April 2020 – present

Related
- The Great Pottery Throw Down; The Piano

The Great British Sewing Bee is a BBC reality show that began airing on BBC Two on 2 April 2013. In the show, talented amateur sewers compete to be named "Britain's best home sewer". A spin-off of the format of The Great British Bake Off, the programme was presented by Claudia Winkleman for the first four series, with judges Patrick Grant, May Martin (series 1–3), and Esme Young (since series 4).

After a three-year hiatus, the series returned in 2019, with Joe Lycett taking over as presenter. The sixth series began airing on BBC One in April 2020 and the seventh began airing in April 2021. Sara Pascoe took over as presenter from series 8, which began airing in April 2022. Kiell Smith-Bynoe took over presenting for series 10 in May 2024, with Pascoe returning for series 11. Sophie Willan replaced Pascoe as host of the 2025 Christmas Celebrity Special and also hosted the 2026 season. Since 2022 Sunny Bank Mills in Farsley, West Yorkshire has served as the new filming location for series 8 onwards.

== Series format ==
The show format is similar to The Great British Bake Off in that each episode features three challenges within an overall theme. The series starts with 10 amateur sewers, with the weakest eliminated each episode. In the Pattern Challenge, the judges give them the same pattern, which they must follow as accurately as possible. In the Transformation Challenge, existing garments or fabrics of a similar form, picked from a rail provided by the programme, or sourced by the contestants themselves, are reinvented by the sewers as a specified different type of garment. In the third Made-to-measure Challenge, the sewers design and create their own garments, and must adjust their patterns to fit human models.

== Series overview ==
Series	Episodes	Premiere	Finale	Winner
1	4	2 April 2013	23 April 2013	Ann Rowley
2	8	18 February 2014	8 April 2014	Heather Jacks
3	6	5 February 2015	12 March 2015	Matt Chapple
4	8	16 May 2016	4 July 2016	Charlotte Newland
5	8	12 February 2019	2 April 2019	Juliet Uzor
6	10	22 April 2020	24 June 2020	Clare Bradley
7	10	14 April 2021	16 June 2021	Serena Baker
8	10	27 April 2022	29 June 2022	Annie Phillips
9	10	24 May 2023	26 July 2023	Asmaa Al-Allak
10	10	21 May 2024	24 July 2024	Luke Iveson
11	10	15 July 2025	16 September 2025	Caroline 'Caz' Wilson
12	10	14 July 2026	15 September 2026	Anna Pownall

=== Series 1 (2013) ===
The first series of The Great British Sewing Bee started on 2 April and aired for four episodes, concluding on 23 April 2013. The series was hosted by Claudia Winkleman and the judges were WI tutor May Martin and Patrick Grant of Savile Row. The all-female final was won by Ann, with Sandra and Lauren as runners up.

=== Series 2 (2014) ===
A second series of The Great British Sewing Bee began airing on 18 February 2014 on BBC Two. The series was filmed at Metropolitan Wharf in London, with Claudia Winkleman returning as host alongside May Martin and Patrick Grant as the judges. Once again it was an all-female final, which was won by Heather, with Chinelo and Tamara as the runners up.

=== Series 3 (2015) ===
The third series of The Great British Sewing Bee began airing over six weeks from 5 February 2015 on BBC Two. It was once again filmed at Metropolitan Wharf in London, with Claudia Winkleman returning as host alongside resident judges May Martin and Patrick Grant. After six weeks of competition, the ten sewers were reduced to the three finalists - this time, there were two male and one female finalists - with Matt declared the winner, and Lorna and Neil as the runners-up.

=== Series 4 (2016) ===
The fourth series of The Great British Sewing Bee began airing on 16 May 2016. May Martin was replaced by new judge Esme Young. The finalists were Jade, Charlotte, and Joyce, with Charlotte the winner.

=== Series 5 (2019) ===
The fifth series began on 12 February 2019 on BBC Two. Joe Lycett took over from Claudia Winkleman as presenter, and Esme Young and Patrick Grant returned as judges. The series was shot at 47-49 Tanner Street. Exterior shots are of 1 Tanner Street, Bermondsey. The finalists were Juliet, Leah and Riccardo, with Juliet winning.

=== Series 6 (2020) ===
The sixth series began on 22 April 2020 on BBC One. Joe Lycett returned as presenter, and Esme Young and Patrick Grant also returned as judges. The finalists were Clare, Matt, and Nicole, with Clare winning.

=== Series 7 (2021) ===
The seventh series began on 14 April 2021 on BBC One. As with the previous series, Joe Lycett returned as host, along with Esme Young and Patrick Grant as judges. The finalists were Raph, Rebecca and Serena, with Serena winning.

=== Series 8 (2022) ===
The eighth series began airing on 27 April 2022 on BBC One. Esme Young and Patrick Grant returned as judges, whilst Sara Pascoe took over as presenter. Production moved to Sunny Bank Mills in Farsley, Leeds. The finalists were Annie, Brogan, Debra and Man Yee, with Annie winning.

=== Series 9 (2023) ===
The ninth series began on 24 May 2023 on BBC One. Sara Pascoe returned as presenter, and Esme Young and Patrick Grant also returned as judges. The finalists were Asmaa, Mia and Tony R, with Asmaa winning.

=== Series 10 (2024) ===
The tenth series began on 21 May 2024 on BBC One. Esme Young and Patrick Grant returned as judges, whilst Kiell Smith-Bynoe took over as presenter. The finalists were Ailsa, Luke and Pascha, with Luke winning.

=== Series 11 (2025) ===
The eleventh series began on 15 July 2025 on BBC One. Esme Young and Patrick Grant returned as judges, with Sara Pascoe returning as host having taking the previous series off due to maternity leave. The finalists were Caz, Órla, and Yasmin, with Caz winning. This was Pascoe's last series presenting with actress Sophie Willan taking over next series.

=== Series 12 (2026) ===
The twelfth series began on 14 July 2026 on BBC One. Esme Young and Patrick Grant returned as judges, whilst Sophie Willan took over from Sara Pascoe as presenter. The finalists were Anna, Beth, and Emma, with Anna winning.

== Specials ==
Winner

=== Christmas Special (2013) ===
No.	Title	Original release date	Viewers (millions)
1	"Christmas Special"	15 December 2013	1.14
Semi-finalists Lauren, Sandra, Stuart, and winner Ann return for a Christmas special. Holiday projects include a table runner, embroidered Christmas napkins, and a Christmas stocking.

=== The BBC Children in Need Sewing Bee (2014) ===
Three special episodes were commissioned as 12 celebrities took to the sewing machines in a bid to raise money for Children in Need.

Episode	Sewer	Pattern Challenge (A Line Skirt)	Alteration Challenge (Hawaiian Shirt)		Made-to-measure (A Dress from their favourite era)	Presenter	Originally Aired	Viewers (millions)
1	Edith Bowman	2	Cape	2	1950s Flared Dress	Jenny Eclair	21 October 2014	2.25
1	Dave Myers	4	Child's Dress	3	1960s A Line dress	Jenny Eclair	21 October 2014	2.25
1	Dawn Harper	1	Tunic Dress	4	1920s Flapper Dress	Jenny Eclair	21 October 2014	2.25
1	Wendi Peters	3	Sundress	1	1950s V-Neck Dress	Jenny Eclair	21 October 2014	2.25
Episode	Sewer	Pattern Challenge (Pyjama Bottoms)	Alteration Challenge (Onesie-Animal Costume)		Made-to-measure (Childhood Story Skirt)	Presenter	Originally Aired	Viewers (millions)
2	Gaby Roslin	3	Dinosaur	2	Alice in Wonderland Tea Party	Sara Cox	23 October 2014	1.87
2	Louie Spence	2	Ladybird	3	Ra-ra Skirt	Sara Cox	23 October 2014	1.87
2	Mark Watson	4	Zebrafish	3	The Emperor's New Clothes	Sara Cox	23 October 2014	1.87
2	Pam Ferris	1	Cockerel	1	London Skyline at Night	Sara Cox	23 October 2014	1.87
Episode	Sewer	Pattern Challenge (Jersey T-shirt)	Alteration Challenge (Old Prom Dress)		Made-to-measure (Child's Garment)	Presenter	Originally Aired	Viewers (millions)
3	Gemma Cairney	4	Covered Prom Dress	4	Silk Brocade Cape	Anita Rani	24 October 2014	1.86
3	Helen Lederer	3	Camden Lock '84	3	Silk Party Dress	Anita Rani	24 October 2014	1.86
3	Kathryn Flett	2	Playsuit	2	Little Red Riding Hood Cloak	Anita Rani	24 October 2014	1.86
3	Timmy Matley	1	Gathered Skirt	1	Michael Jackson Pleather Jacket	Anita Rani	24 October 2014	1.86

=== Celebrity Christmas Special (2020) ===
Sewer	Pattern Challenge (Pyjama Bottoms)	Transformation Challenge (Dog Coats)		Made-to-measure (Christmas Day Dress)	Originally Aired	Viewers (millions)
Sara Pascoe	4	Sleigh Outfit	2	Tartan Dress	26 December 2020	5.93
Ranj Singh	3	Snow Angel	4	Christmas Party Dress	26 December 2020	5.93
Denise Van Outen	1	Superhero Cloak	3	Christmas Pudding Dress	26 December 2020	5.93
Shirley Ballas	2	Sleigh Bells Outfit	1	Wrap Dress	26 December 2020	5.93

=== Celebrity New Year Special (2020) ===
Sewer	Pattern Challenge (Children's Party Skirt)	Transformation Challenge (Old Clothes)		Made-to-measure (New Year's Memories Party Dress)	Originally Aired	Viewers (millions)
Lesley Joseph	2	Ugly Sister Costume	4	Cinderella Evening Dress	31 December 2020	
The Vivienne	1	Cinderella Costume	2	Fishtail Dress	31 December 2020	
Sabrina Grant	4	Jasmine Costume	3	Cocktail Dress	31 December 2020	
Sally Phillips	3	Pantomime Horse Costume	1	Dog-print Dress	31 December 2020	

=== Celebrity Christmas Special (2021) ===
Sewer	Pattern Challenge (Christmas Sweatshirt)	Transformation Challenge (Second-hand Clothes)		Made-to-measure (An outfit from Christmas Past)	Originally Aired	Viewers (millions)
Kate Bottley	2	Reindeer Outfit	1	Festive Kaftan	22 December 2021	4.28
Kiell Smith-Bynoe	3	Christmas Present Outfit	2	Mrs Claus Dress	22 December 2021	4.28
Antony Cotton	1	Green and Red Bow Dress	3	Christmas Present Dress	22 December 2021	4.28
Anneka Rice	3	Punk Angel Dress	4	Festive Jumpsuit	22 December 2021	4.28

=== Celebrity New Year Special (2021) ===
Sewer	Pattern Challenge (Festive Waistcoat)	Transformation Challenge (Party Dress)		Made-to-measure (Party Food Fancy Dress)	Originally Aired	Viewers (millions)
Lawrence Chaney	1	Silver Dress	1	'Pigs in Blankets' Dress	30 December 2021	
Kirsty Wark	4	Black and Purple Dress	3	'Hogmanay Buffet' Dress	30 December 2021	
Claire Richards	2	Pink Dress	4	'Ice Cream Sundae' Dress	30 December 2021	
Rose Matafeo	3	Gold Dress	2	'Fondue Set' Dress	30 December 2021	

=== Celebrity Christmas Special (2022) ===
Sewer	Pattern Challenge (Festive Apron)	Transformation Challenge (Baby Outfit)		Made-to-measure (Pop Inspired Outfit)	Originally Aired	Viewers (millions)
Johannes Radebe	1	Candy Cane Outfit	2	Harry Styles-inspired Jumpsuit	22 December 2022	3.73
Natalie Cassidy	4	Christmas Pudding	3	Liam Gallagher-inspired Parka	22 December 2022	3.73
Rosie Ramsey	3	Christmas Present	1	Dolly Parton-inspired Dress	22 December 2022	3.73
Penny Lancaster	2	Christmas Ornament	4	Madonna-inspired Dress	22 December 2022	3.73

=== Celebrity Christmas Special (2023) ===
Sewer	Pattern Challenge (Christmas Stocking)	Transformation Challenge (Puffer Jacket)		Made-to-measure (Christmas Day Garment)	Originally Aired	Viewers (millions)
Kerry Godliman	4	Brussels sprout	1	Glamorous two-piece	21 December 2023	3.02
Toyah Willcox	2	Carrot	2	"Snow Queen" outfit	21 December 2023	3.02
Jessica Knappett	1	Brussels sprout	4	Christmas tree dress	21 December 2023	3.02
Hammed Animashaun	3	Purple Quality Street	3	Christmas tunic	21 December 2023	3.02

=== Celebrity Christmas Special (2024) ===
Sewer	Pattern Challenge (Advent Calendar)	Transformation Challenge (Onesie)		Made-to-measure (Christmas No. 1 inspired outfit)	Originally Aired	Viewers (millions)
Ian "H" Watkins	1	Reindeer	1	"Green, Green Grass of Home" inspired dragon outfit	19 December 2024	3.12
Kellie Bright	2	Christmas Pudding	3	"Last Christmas" inspired jumpsuit	19 December 2024	3.12
Fatiha El-Ghorri	3	Ice Queen	4	"Stay Another Day" inspired kaftan	19 December 2024	3.12
Charlotte Crosby	4	Star	2	"Sausage Rolls for Everyone" inspired dress	19 December 2024	3.12

=== Celebrity Christmas Special (2025) ===
Host: Sophie Willan

Sewer	Pattern Challenge (Christmas Present Sack)	Transformation Challenge (Child's Fancy Dress Outfit, inspired by The Twelve Days of Christmas)		Made-to-measure (Outfit based on a Favourite Christmas Treat)	Originally Aired	Viewers (millions)
Anton Du Beke	1	Six Geese A-laying	1	Champagne Flute Dress	24 December 2025	3.3
Lucy Beaumont	4	Eight Maids A-milking	2	Blue Cheese & Pickled Onions Dress	24 December 2025	3.3
Susan Wokoma	3	Three French Hens	4	Ice Cream Dessert Dress	24 December 2025	3.3
Tom Wilson	2	Seven Swans A-swimming	3	Gingerbread Dress	24 December 2025	3.3

== International versions ==
=== Broadcast ===
- Australia — The series premiered on 15 December 2014 on The LifeStyle Channel.
- Japan — broadcast since 3 October 2019 on NHK Educational TV.
- New Zealand - broadcast since 2021 on TVNZ.

Country	Local title	Host(s)	Judges	Channel	Premiere
Argentina	Corte y confección (Cut and confection)	Andrea Politti	Verónica de la Canal; Benito Fernández; Fabián Zitta	Canal 13	14 January 2019
Denmark	Klar, parat, sy (Ready, Set, Sew)	Lene Beier	Jesper Høvring; Jette With	TV 2	14 March 2015
France	Cousu Main (Hand Sewn)	Cristina Córdula	Amparo Lellouche; Julien Scavini	M6	30 August 2014
Germany	Geschickt eingefädelt (Skillfully Threaded)	Guido Maria Kretschmer	Inge Szoltysik-Sparrer; Anke Müller	VOX	3 November 2015
Italy	Tailor Made – Chi ha la stoffa? (Tailor Made – Who Has What It Takes?)	Tommaso Zorzi	Elide Morelli; Cristina Tardito	Discovery+ Real Time	28 June 2022 (Discovery+); 14 September 2022 (Real Time)
Netherlands	Door Het Oog Van De Naald (Through the Eye of the Needle)	Nicolette van Dam	Nelleke Rimmelzwaan; Maik de Boer	RTL 4	28 January 2015
Norway	Symesterskapet (Sewing Championship)	Christine Hope	Tine Solheim (2014-2017); Andreas Feet (2014-); Jenny Skavlan (2019-)	NRK	19 November 2014
Portugal	Cosido à mão (Hand Sewn)	Sónia Araújo	Susana Agostinho; Paulo Battista; Mariama Barbosa	RTP1	4 November 2017
Spain	Maestros de la costura (Masters of Sewing)	Raquel Sánchez Silva	Lorenzo Caprile; María Escoté; Palomo Spain	La 1	12 February 2018
Spain	Maestros de la costura Celebrity (Masters of Sewing Celebrity)	Raquel Sánchez Silva	Lorenzo Caprile; María Escoté; Palomo Spain	La 1	9 February 2025
Sweden	Hela Sverige Syr (The Whole of Sweden Is Sewing)	Linda Lindorff	Lisbeth Stålborg; Frederik Andersen	Sjuan	14 October 2014

== Etymology ==
Historically the word bee has been used to describe a get-together where a specific action is being carried out, such as a spelling bee, husking bee, a quilting bee, or an apple bee. In the USA, the Scripps National Spelling Bee competition has been held annually since 1925. Its etymology is unclear, but the word possibly derives from the Old English word bēn, meaning prayer.

== See also ==
- British fashion
- Project Runway
