= Farsley =

Village in Leeds, West Yorkshire, England

Coordinates: 53.8116°N 1.6718°W

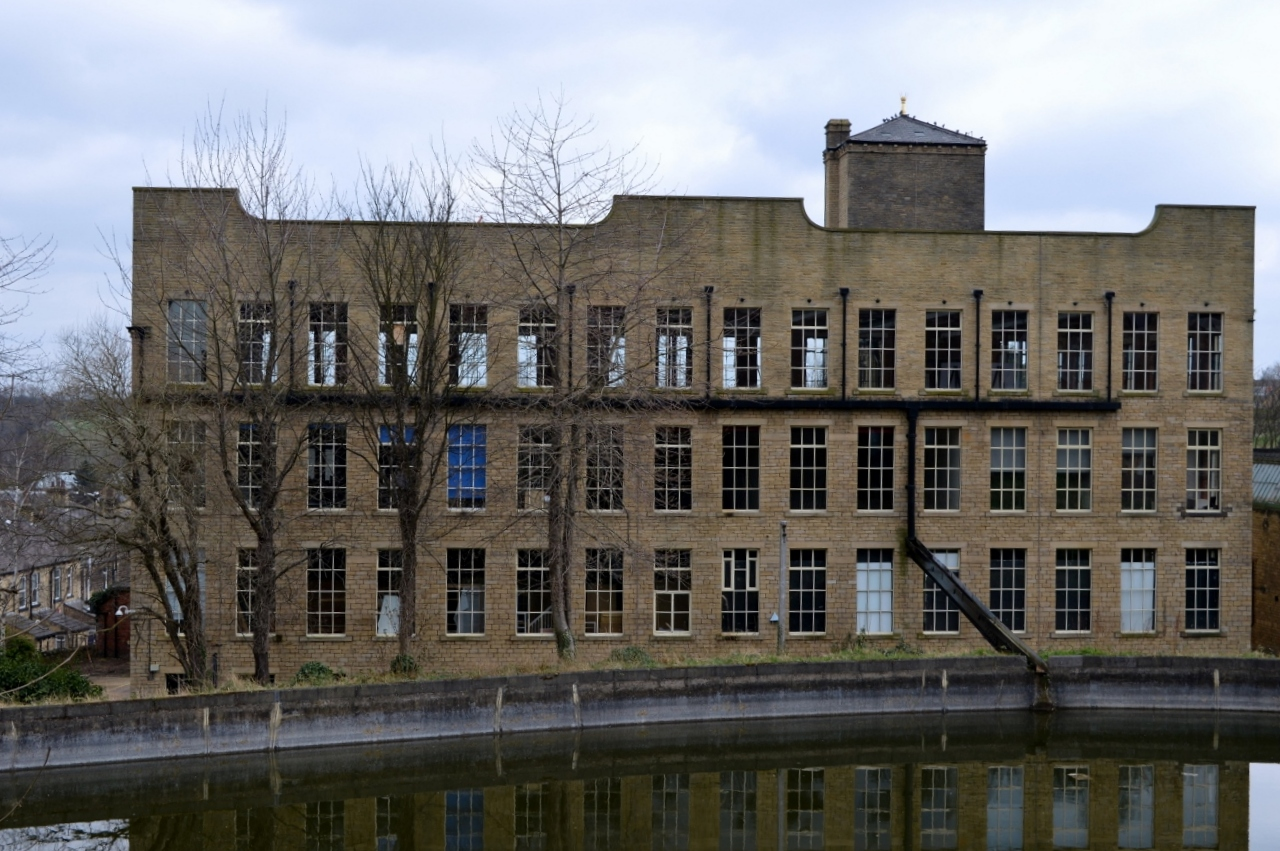
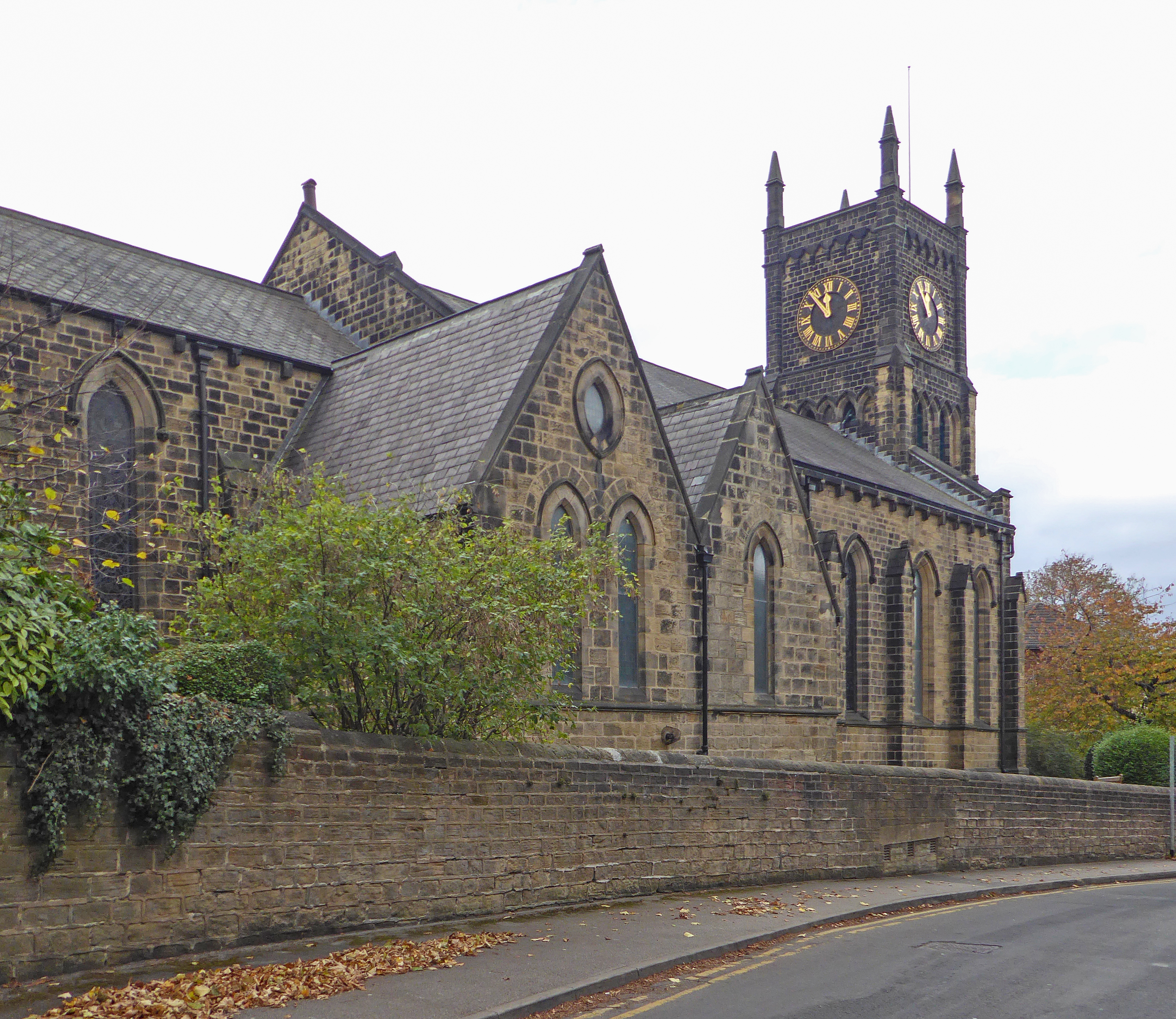
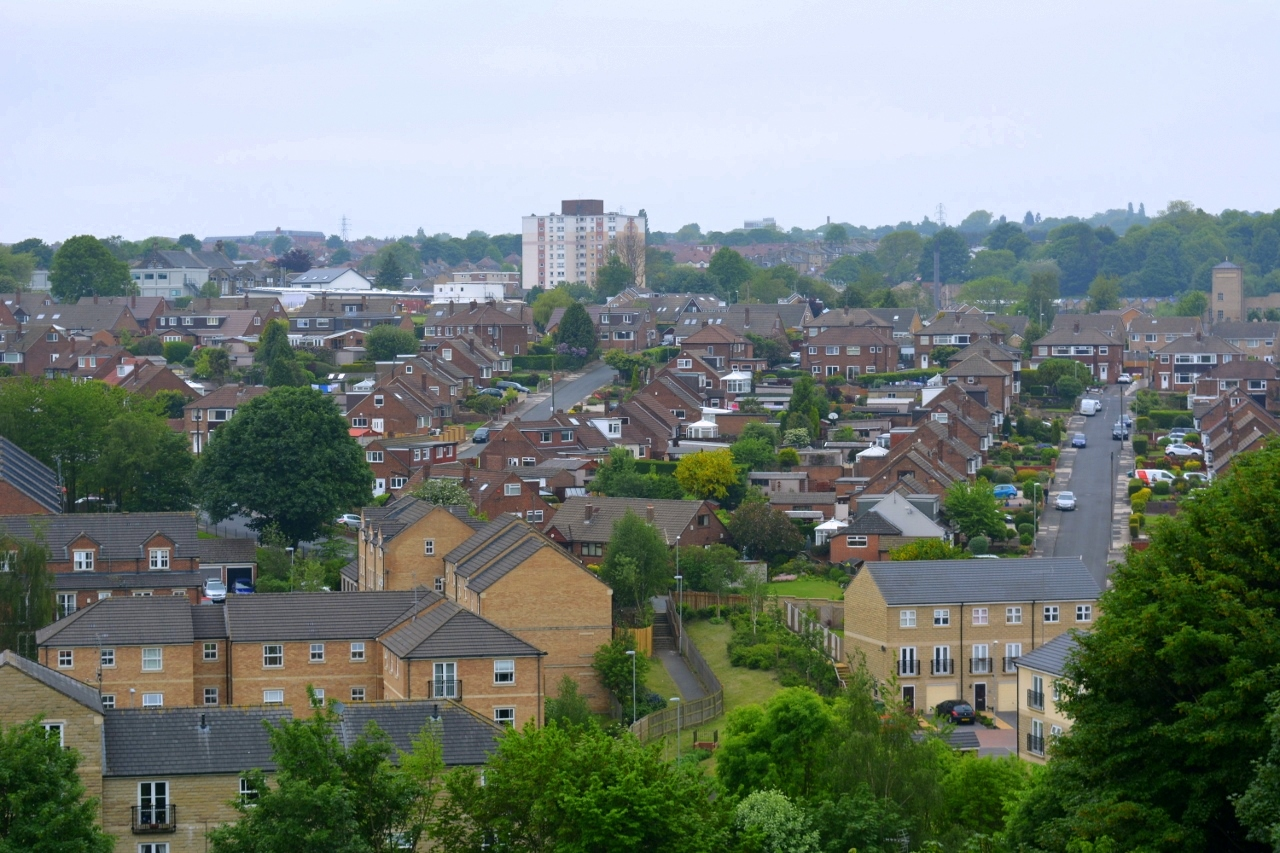
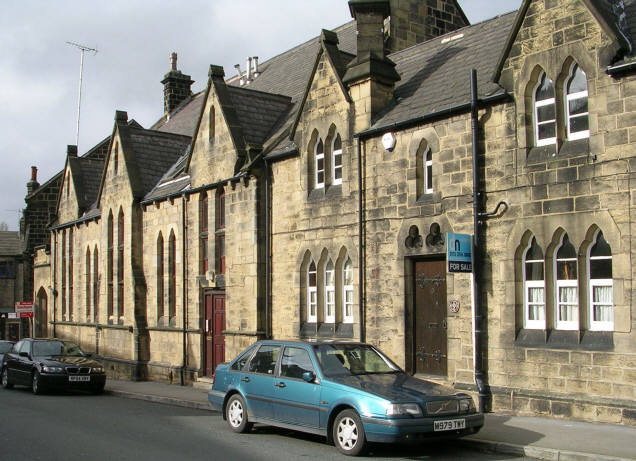
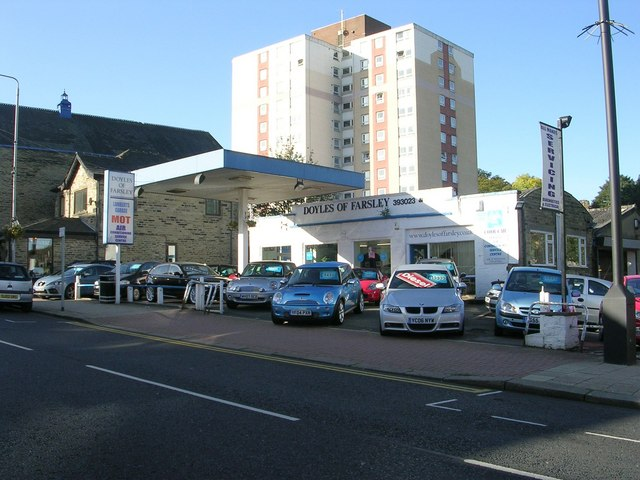
- Sunny Bank Mills St John’s Church View of Farsley New Street Town Street

- Location within West Yorkshire
- Population: 22,594 (Ward. Calverley and Farsley. 2011 census)
- Metropolitan borough: City of Leeds
- Metropolitan county: West Yorkshire
- Region: Yorkshire and the Humber
- Country: England
- Sovereign state: United Kingdom
- Post town: PUDSEY
- Postcode district: LS28
- Dialling code: 0113
- Police: West Yorkshire
- Fire: West Yorkshire
- Ambulance: Yorkshire
- UK Parliament: Leeds West and Pudsey

Farsley is a village in Leeds, West Yorkshire, England, 6 miles (9.7 km) west of Leeds city centre and 4 miles (6.4 km) east of Bradford near Pudsey. Before 1974, Farsley was part of the Borough of Pudsey. Before 1937 it had its own urban district council. The ward of Calverley and Farsley also includes the estate of Swinnow and some northern parts of Pudsey.

During the industrial revolution, Farsley was a centre for wool processing as there were a number of mills in the area. Sunny Bank Mills, still owned by the Gaunt family, is currently part of a huge multi-million pound revitalisation project bringing a new appreciation of Farsley's mill heritage. Since 2022 the mills have served as the filming location for series 8 onwards of The Great British Sewing Bee.

Farsley is just off the main road between Leeds and Bradford and just off the A6110 Leeds outer ring road. New Pudsey railway station is between Farsley and Pudsey providing train services towards Leeds, Bradford, Manchester Victoria and Blackpool.

== History ==
Farsley was formerly a chapelry in the parish of Calverley, in 1894 Farsley became an urban district. On 31 December 1894 Farsley became a civil parish, being formed from the parish of Calverley with Farsley in Farsley Urban District. On 1 April 1937 the district was abolished and merged with the Municipal Borough of Pudsey. On 1 April 1937 the parish was also abolished and merged with Pudsey. In 1931 the parish had a population of 6158.

=== Toponymy ===
The name Farsley is first attested in the 1086 Domesday Book as Fersellei and Ferselleia. The second element of the name comes from the Old English word lēah ('open land in a wood'). The etymology of the first element is less certain, but thought either to be Old English fyrs ('gorse') or the putative *fers ('heifer'). Thus the name originally meant either a clearing characterised by gorse bushes or by grazing cattle.

== Education ==
In Farsley there are three primary schools: Farsley Farfield Primary School for 3 to 11-year-old children, Westroyd Primary School and Nursery for 3 to 11 year olds, and Farsley Springbank Primary School for 4 to 11 year old pupils. The local secondary school is Co-op Academy Priesthorpe with about 1,100 pupils.

== Sport ==
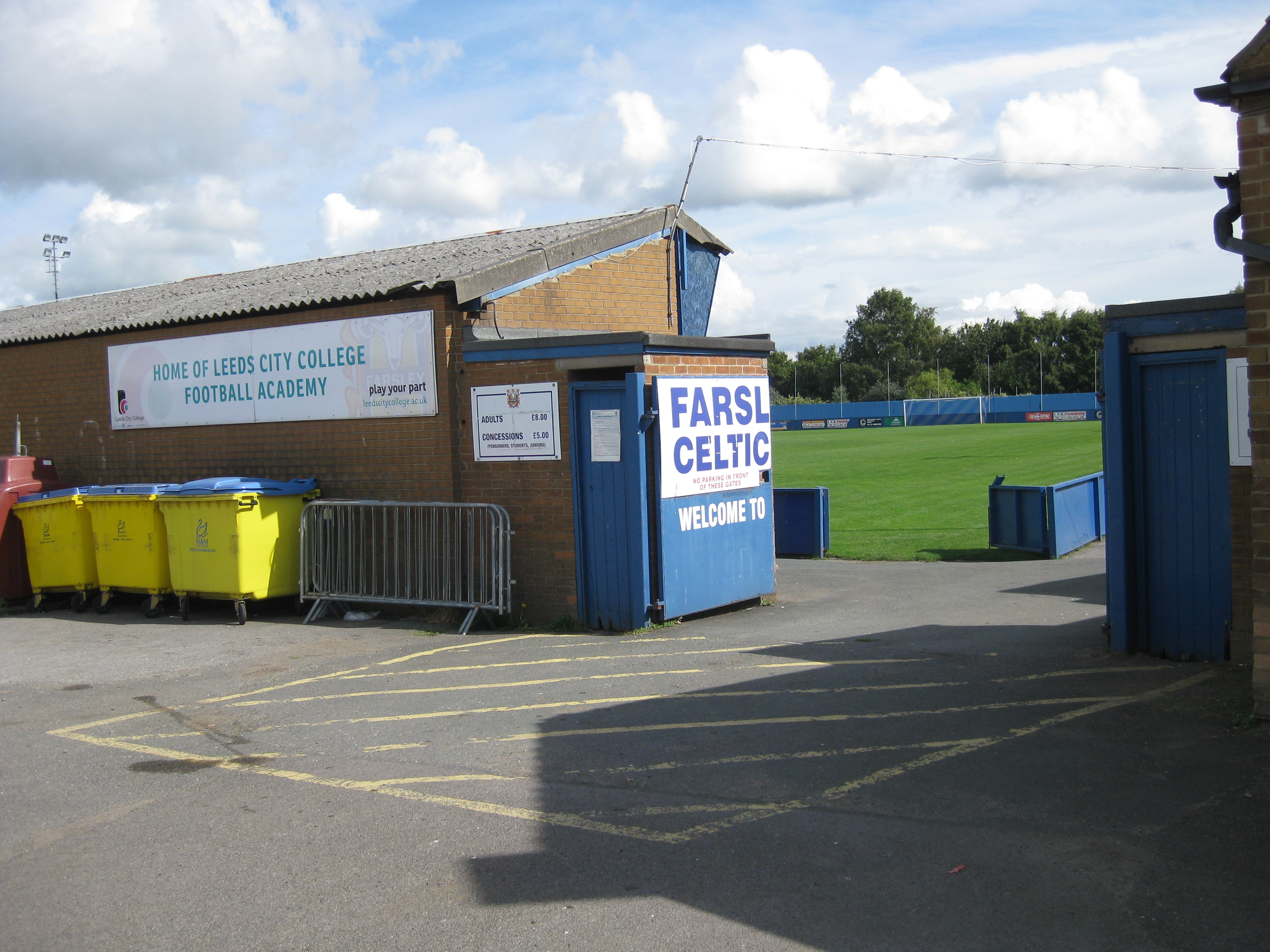
Throstle Nest football ground

Farsley was home to the non-League football team Farsley Celtic F.C. who played at Throstle Nest), then known as The Citadel. They were formed in 2010 to replace Farsley Celtic A.F.C. after they were wound up but are seen as a continuation of the previous club.

Farsley Cricket Club, whose ground is situated in Red Lane, play in the Bradford League Division 1. Raymond Illingworth, former England cricket captain, is their most notable former player.

== Housing ==
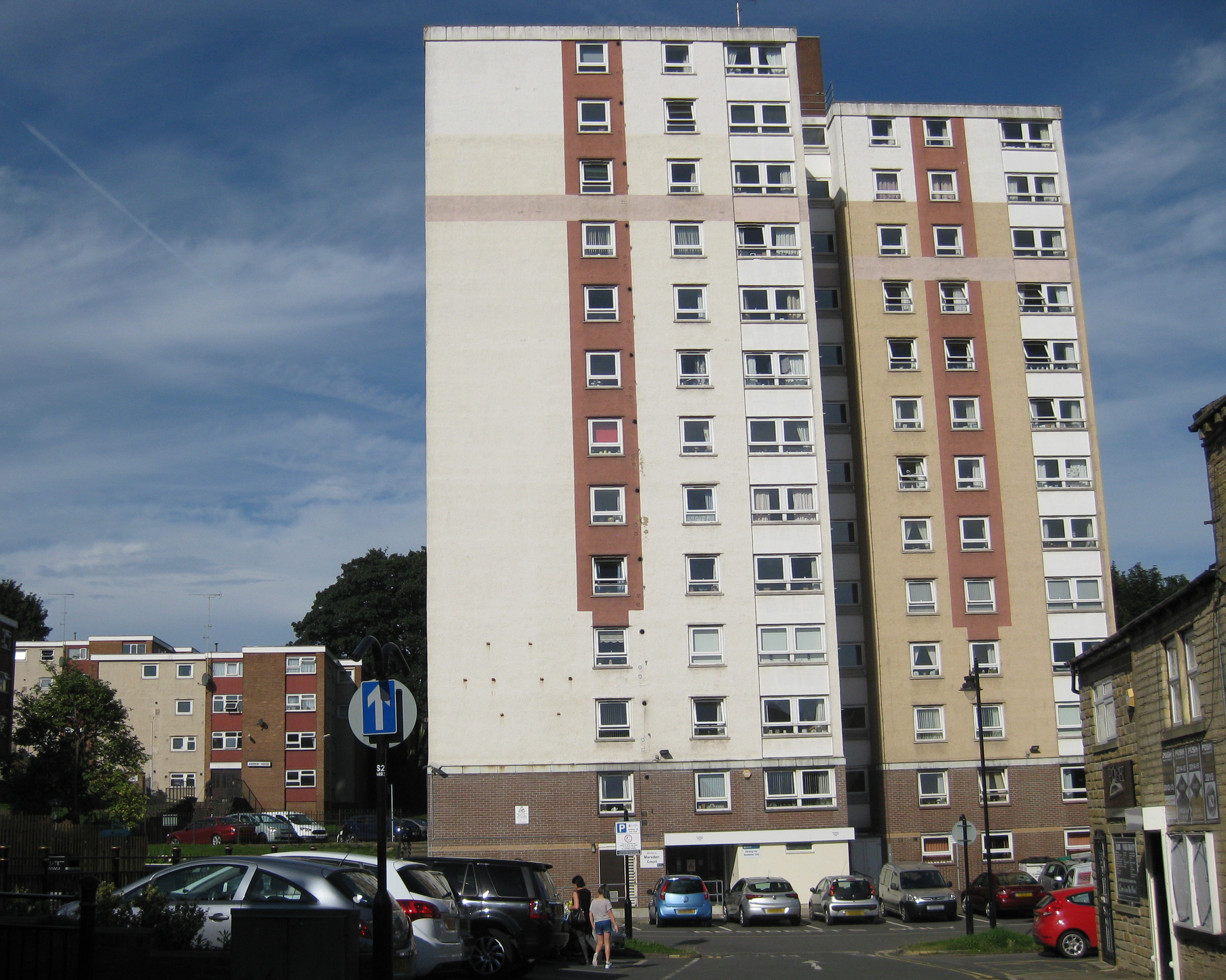
Marsden Court flats, with low rise to left

Farsley has a variety of housing. Around Town Street are some older terrace houses and smaller cottages. To the west of Town Street is a small council estate, consisting mainly of flats, the tallest block being twelve stories high. Towards the outskirts of Farsley there are many large detached houses.

== Notable people ==
- The Rev. Samuel Marsden (born in Farsley). Sheephead Park is a memorial garden dedicated to Marsden and is situated on Farsley Town Street.
- Sculptor John Wormald Appleyard (1831–1894) grew up in Farsley. There is a stained glass window dedicated to him in St John's Church.
- Rugby league footballer Fred Farrar, whose nickname was The Farsley Flyer, was a member of Hunslet's 1907–08 All Four Cups winning team.

== Community engagement ==
The Friends of Farsley Rehoboth Burial Ground charity was set up to purchase, reclaim and maintain a historic burial ground in Farsley, just off Coal Hill Lane. The group of volunteers won an Aviva Community Fund £1,000 grant and went on to receive registered charity status. The burial ground is situated in proximity to the Springfield Worsted Mill and the Bank Bottom Woollen Mill and had been closed to the public for over 11 years before the charity gained ownership in June 2019.

A 2019 Armistice Day Service in Farsley Rehoboth was broadcast on BBC Look North.

In November 2020 The Friends of Farsley Rehoboth reported they had been awarded a substantial grant of £14,200 from the Culture Recovery Fund for Heritage Programme.

== See also ==
- Listed buildings in Calverley and Farsley
