= Adaptive clothing =

Clothing designed for the needs of disabled people

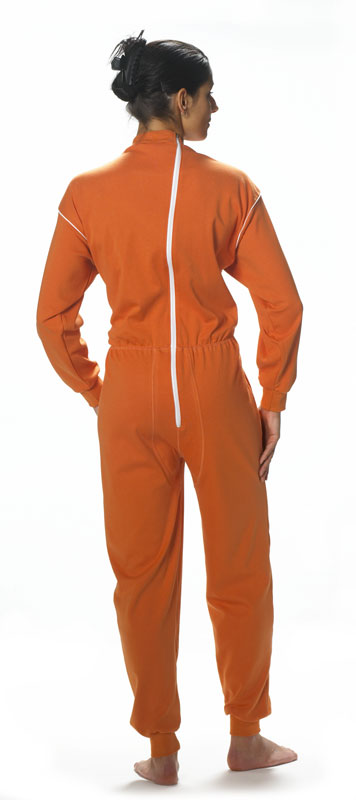
Locking clothing, with the zipper on the back. Such clothing is often used by the elderly or those with disabilities.

Adaptive clothing is clothing designed around the needs and abilities of people with varying degrees of disability, including congenital disabilities, acquired disabilities (such as the result of an injury, illness or accident), age (elderly people may have trouble with opening and closing buttons) and temporary disabilities, as well as physical disabilities. Adaptive clothing is influenced by factors such as age, disability type, level of independence, mobility and dexterity, as well as whether a person requires help when dressing, such as from a caregiver. People who struggle with zippers, shoelaces, buttons or even fabrics and texture due to a type of disability may need adaptive clothing. Most adaptive clothing designs are taken from general-market clothing, the comfort of which began to increase in the 1950s, with new technologies such as elastic waistbands and stretchy fabrics.

Adaptive clothing is utilized by people with a wide range of disabilities, from wheelchair users and people with visible disabilities to those whose disabilities are not as visible, but still find themselves limited by the construction of typical clothing. Those with autism may experience sensory sensitivities to certain fabrics, which is not a visible ailment. There is also use of adaptive clothing by the elderly and children with and without disabilities, to make it easier to operate their clothing without assistance or to assist caregivers in dressing the user. Adaptive design, a core component of adaptive clothing design and construction, proactively addresses these foreseen limitations by adapting clothing to the user, benefitting both them and caregivers or healthcare professionals to be more efficient, increasing independence, as well as preventing potential back and shoulder injuries. If both functional and fashionable, adaptive clothing can increase an individual's quality of life and confidence.

== Types of adaptations ==
There are some other adaptations that take place in order to make the clothes as comfortable as possible for these individuals.

One example is breathability as well as using natural fibres as to not irritate the skin. Another is specialized garment patterns, seams, and closures, for example having outward facing seams in order to not irritate skin or closures that are easily opened and close like magnets. Being able to adjust temperature is important because people with physical disabilities sometimes have different temperature needs than others. Adaptive clothing typically incorporates flat seams to reduce friction, and discreet adaptations that provide an outward appearance as consistent with fashion norms as possible. For example, pants can have longer inseams in the back to provide more coverage for wheelchair users. These adaptations may include easy-access snap fasteners and velcro fastenings, fabric that stretches in one or both directions, clothing design with room to accommodate incontinence aids, a longer rise in the back of trousers to accommodate wheelchair users, and an elasticated waist for increased comfort and easier dressing.

Individuals with limited or no dexterity may experience difficulty in manipulating certain fastenings, such as buttons and zippers. For this reason, it is common for adaptive clothing to utilize velcro or magnetic closures in the place of closures that would require more dexterity.

Similarly, disabled people whose mobility limits them from engaging in the typical full range of motion commonly experience difficulty when dressing in clothing that must be pulled up from the feet or pulled over the head; as such, adaptive clothing may feature hidden flap-openings or additional closures that allow the garment itself to be pulled on without having to bend over or reach up. These may take the form of velcro flaps at the neck and shoulders, allowing the neckline to expand when the garment is pulled down over the head. The same adjustments may also be made for shoes and other accessories, with velcro closures being the most common feature in adaptive shoes.

The development of adaptive-functional clothing tailored to the needs of individuals with disabilities is a complex undertaking that necessitates ongoing research and draws upon knowledge from various fields. The sophistication of these garments designed for the disabled hinges on two primary factors. First, the clothing should incorporate an aesthetic dimension, ensuring it aligns with the aesthetic preferences of individuals with disabilities without emphasizing their impairments. This clothing should promote psychological well-being, maintain a harmonious color palette, and contribute to concealing any disabilities. Second, the clothing should be attuned to the physical characteristics of the disabled individuals, both in static and dynamic situations, taking into account factors such as age, health status, and other relevant considerations. Furthermore, the clothing should offer comfort during both the dressing and undressing processes, requiring as little physical effort as possible.

=== Examples ===
Disability	Associated problem	Adaptive clothing solution
Alzheimer's disease	Individual disrobes at inappropriate times.	Locking clothing
Oedema	Swelling of feet and legs leads to difficulty wearing conventional footwear or pants.	Adaptive shoes and pants adjustable in size, offering non-restrictive closures. Compression socks and clothing can improve blood flow and reduce oedema.
Incontinence	Reduced bladder control and urgency	Clothing that can be removed easily and quickly and can accommodate incontinence aids discreetly and comfortably.
Parkinson's disease and arthritis (e.g., Rheumatoid arthritis)	Loss of fine motor skills and dexterity	Buttons and zippers are replaced with easy touch Velcro or magnetic closures.
Contractures, arthritis, MS, MDS, SCI, MD, paraplegia, quadriplegia	Inability to bend muscles or move joints	Open back clothing which allows the clothing to be put on frontwards, eliminating the need to bend or rotate muscles or joints.
Digestive Disorders & Bowel Disease	Medical devices are common, including G/GJ feeding tubes, colostomy, and ileostomy	Clothing that provides access to the abdomen via snaps, zippers, or strategic layering and draping. Depending on the individual, looser clothing may be preferred to conceal abdominal devices, or comfortably tight, supportive clothing may be preferred to keep devices in place (e.g. high-waisted leggings, supportive waistbands).
Scoliosis	Curved spine	Back bodice to help hold spine straighter
Sensory processing disorder	Rough fabrics, seams and labels cause discomfort and distress	Sensory-friendly clothing

=== Factors of design ===
Clothing is designed with human, environment, and, obviously, clothing in mind. This is called the "Human-Clothing-Environment". These 3 factors contribute to the design of each piece of clothing. The human category is further broken down into subcategories, which includes visible or invisible disabilities and how that affects the user of an article of clothing. Only when all of the "Human-Clothing-Environment" is in equilibrium will the clothing be comfortable, functional, and fashionable for the user.

There is a process by which clothing creators may follow to design more functional clothing articles. The first step is to identify the problem at which they are trying to solve. For example, are there issues with zippers or buttons, or does the wearer use a wheelchair? Next the get preliminary ideas. After making initial designs and seeing what works and what doesn't, creators make design refinements. Finally, it comes time to make a prototype. Once the prototype it done, it will be evaluated for its form and function. If it does not meet the criteria, the design process is repeated, starting where the creator believes the mistakes were first made. At the end of the process, the clothing design can be implemented and used.
