= Sunny Bank Mills =

British Cultural Centre

Coordinates: 53.814°N 1.670°W

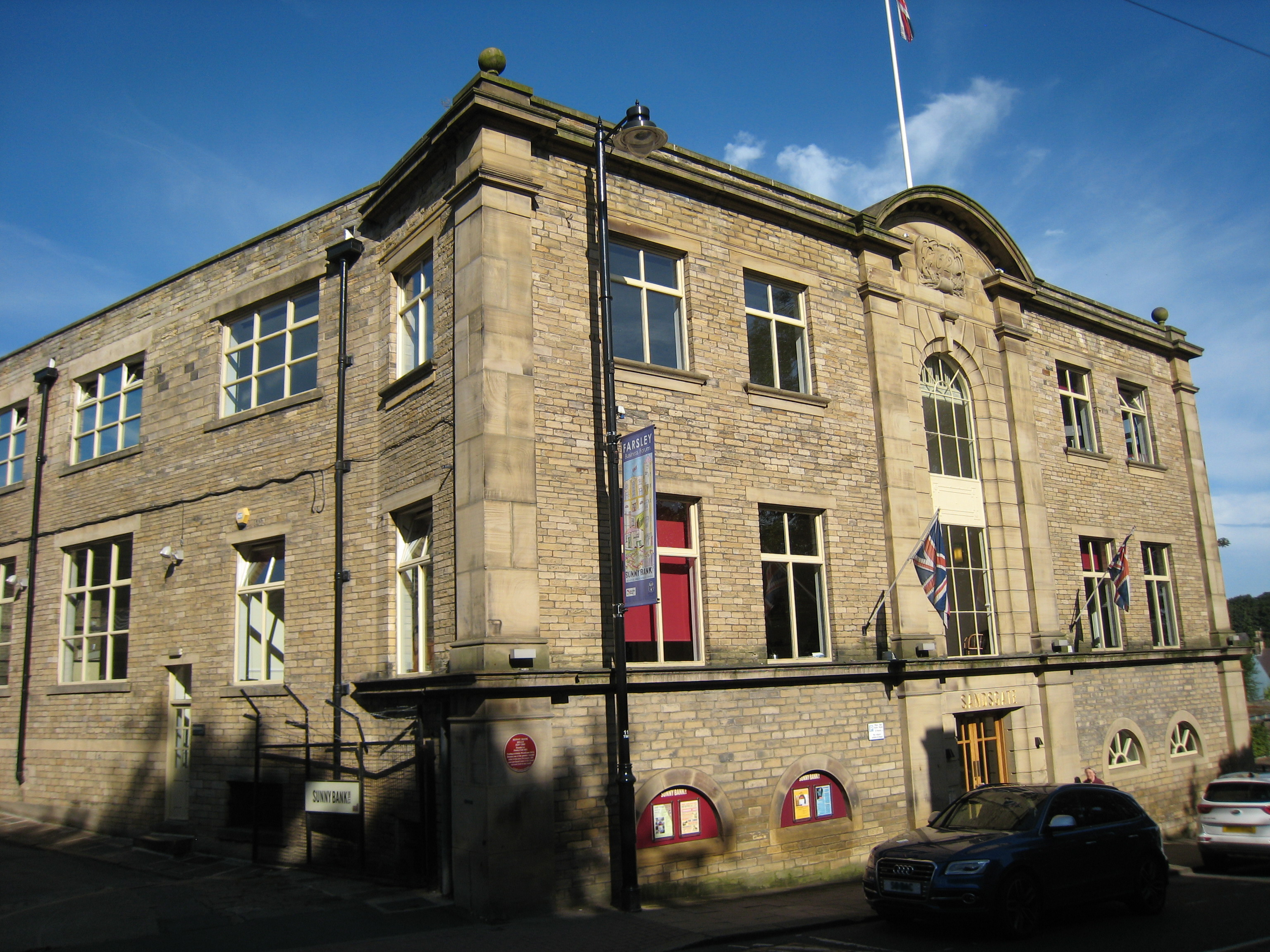
Sunny Bank Mills Gallery entrance in 2017

Sunny Bank Mills is a former textile mill, which specialised in worsted cloth, set in 10 acres of land located on Town Street, Farsley, Leeds, England. Since 2010, it has been developed as a business and artistic community, with an exhibitions gallery selling fine art by local artists; a textile and local history archive; shops, cafés, artist studios; as well as outdoor spaces. It is run by the Gaunt family who took ownership in 1943. The archive was awarded Archive Community Accreditation by West Yorkshire Archive Service in January 2021.

== History ==
In 1820, a group of local clothiers set up a co-operative venture in Farsley to share the cost of rent. They built a woollen scribbling and fulling mill, known as The Farsley Club Mill. By 1839, the mill was known as Sunny Bank Mills and run by the firm of Roberts, Ross & Co. In 1842, the mill was one of several local mills shut down temporarily by rioters. In 1881, the mill was sold to Edwin Woodhouse for £9,540, comprising two mills, weaving sheds, outbuildings, several houses, three reservoirs and land. Woodhouse had worked his way up as an apprentice to a woollen manufacturer, and later a travelling salesman, starting his own business in Huddersfield and then moving to Leeds in 1871; after purchasing Sunny Bank Mills he set up a limited company E. Woodhouse and Co. Woodhouse introduced fine worsted cloth manufacture and very quickly established the factory as a high-quality producer. By 1900, it was one of the biggest textile manufacturers in Leeds, producing fine cloth recognised globally for its quality. Woodhouse also became a town councillor and Lord Mayor of Leeds in 1905.

In 1912, a large mill building was constructed. It was later used as a location for British TV series Heartbeat and Emmerdale.

In November 1943, Derek Alfred Gaunt, younger son of William Clifford Gaunt, acquired the Ordinary shares of E. Woodhouse and Co. and took over Sunny Bank with controlling interest. William Gaunt had become a multi-millionaire but had lost a lot of money in the Great Depression. A holding company was formed to look after the shares surrendered by William and by 1943 there was enough money to settle William's debts and allow Derek to acquire Sunny Bank. After WWII, the family moved into supplying high-quality cloth to the Middle East.

In 2008, the Gaunt family sold the textile business but kept the mill buildings. Cousins William and John Gaunt formed Edwin Woodhouse to run the mill. The family then began an extensive restoration project which involved providing premises for a range of businesses - numbering over 70 and employing over 350 people, in 2020. Ten historic looms were sourced from Dewsbury, and became eight working looms available for use by the general public. The 1912 mill building was restored and a new light roof was installed.

In 2017, a not-for-profit company was set up to safeguard the textile archive, overseeing the management, restoration, conservation and promotion of the archive. In 2020, "Project Boilerhouse" was launched to develop further areas of the 10 acres of land. The Weavers' Yard project was completed in November 2020 by CBM Construction and KPP architects. The oldest buildings on the site, dating to 1829, were restored and five-thousand square feet of green space was created.

Since 2022 the mills have served as the new filming location for series 8 onwards of The Great British Sewing Bee.

== Archive ==
The archive is housed in a 3,000 sq ft old warping shed; as of 2017, it is currently being catalogued, preserved and developed. As of 2020, the archive is open to members of the public one day a week. The business records provide information about who worked at the mill and their occupations. The archive was awarded Archive Community Accreditation by West Yorkshire Archive Service in January 2021. A highlight is the collection of Guard books: reference books detailing cloth production from 1829 till 2008 by year and season, with order references.

A research and exhibition project in 2018, on the role of the mill and workers in World War One entitled 'Threads of War', was awarded £10,000 from the National Heritage Lottery Fund as well as attracting researchers from other local archives and reaching out to local primary schools.

== Gallery ==
In addition to artist studios and artist residency spaces, there are several exhibition venues at the Mills. Exhibitions of work for sale in the gallery and shop space last around six weeks. There is an exhibition of art students' work yearly. The gallery is part of the national "Own Art" scheme. It is also a member of the "Donut Project", aimed at encouraging culture in Leeds' suburbs. There are plans for an arts festival of Leeds' artists and a sculpture trail in 2023 as part of a city-wide celebration of culture.
