= Esme Young =

English fashion designer and television presenter

- Born: Emma A. Young; 1949 (age 76–77); Bedford, Bedfordshire, England
- Education: Central St Martins
- Occupation: Fashion designer
- Label: Swanky Modes
- Parent(s): Brian Pashley Young CB CBE, Patricia Cole

Esme Young (born 1949) is an English fashion designer and television presenter. Since 2016, she has been a judge on the BBC reality series The Great British Sewing Bee.

== Early life and education ==
Emma Young was born in 1949 at Bedford Hospital, the second of five children. Her sister Fiona Espenhahn is also a textile artist. Her brother Jeremy is a documentary film producer.

Her father, Air Vice Marshal Brian Pashley Young CB CBE (1918–1992), was born in Natal, South Africa, and was a career officer in the RAF. He was appointed an Officer of the Order of the British Empire in 1944, a Commander of the same order in 1960, and a Commander of the Order of the Bath in 1972. In Series 8 of The Great British Sewing Bee, Young revealed that her father was captain of Wasps RFC in the 1950/51 season. Her mother, Patricia Josephine Cole, was a secretary who worked as a nurse during the Second World War. Young has told interviewers she was "partially deaf" as a child due to otitis media, which affected her reading development and still impacts her life.

Young began attending boarding school at age five. She attended the Convent of the Holy Ghost, Bedford, where she learnt to draw and to sew. She went on to Saint Martins School of Art. When a tutor mispronounced her name as Esme, she began using that instead.

== Career ==
=== Swanky Modes ===
In 1972, Young, along with fellow fashion designers Judy Dewsbury, Melanie Herberfield, and Willie Walters, founded a shop in Camden Town called Swanky Modes. Young told an interviewer the group opened the shop because they "couldn't buy anything we wanted to wear in shops, so we made whatever we wanted to wear".

The house was known for "raunchy body-con dresses". A transparent macintosh that was one of the company's early designs was photographed by Helmut Newton for Nova. Throughout the 1970s and 1980s Swanky Modes clothing appeared in Vogue, Honey and The Face. Their clothing was also photographed by David Bailey, Nick Knight, and John Swannell. Clients included Grace Jones, Julie Christie, and Cher. The company's lycra Amorphous dress is in the collection of the Victoria and Albert Museum.

=== Film and television ===
Young has made costumes for many films including The Beach, Bridget Jones's Diary, Romeo & Juliet and Trainspotting. She designed the bunny costume worn by Renee Zellweger in Bridget Jones's Diary. One of Young's most famous designs was the 'Amorphous Dress' worn by Linda Kozlowski in the 1986 movie Crocodile Dundee; a dress that is now in the V&A Collection.

Since 2016, Young has been a judge on The Great British Sewing Bee.

In December 2022, Young was a contestant on Richard Osman's House of Games.

=== Academic career ===
Young teaches at Central Saint Martins and is involved in a project called "Exploding Fashion" which highlights the importance of pattern cutting.

== Writing ==
Young published her autobiography in 2022: Behind the Seams: My Life in Creativity, Friendship and Adventure from the star of the Great British Sewing Bee.

== Personal life ==
In the 1970s Young squatted in a West London terrace. Young lives in Islington in a rent-controlled Peabody flat she started renting in 1983. She owns a beach hut in Kent.
