= Royal warrant of appointment =

Official royal patronage of tradespeople

Royal warrants of appointment have been issued for centuries to tradespeople who supply goods or services to a royal court or certain royal personages. The royal warrant enables the supplier to advertise the fact that they supply to the issuer of the royal warrant, thus lending prestige to the supplier. Royal families of the United Kingdom, the Netherlands, Belgium, Luxembourg, Monaco, Denmark, Sweden, Japan, and Thailand, among others, allow tradespeople to advertise royal patronage.

Suppliers having a royal warrant charge for the goods and services supplied; the warrant does not imply that the supplier provides goods or services free of charge. Royal warrants are typically advertised on company hoardings, letter-heads and products by displaying the coat of arms or the heraldic badge of the royal personage issuing the royal warrant. Warrants granted by members of the British royal family usually include the phrase "By Appointment to…" followed by the title and name of the royal customer, and then what goods are provided; no other details of what is supplied may be given.

== Purveyors for current households ==
=== Australia ===
Royal warrant holders of the Court of Australia:

- Hardy Brothers

=== Belgium ===
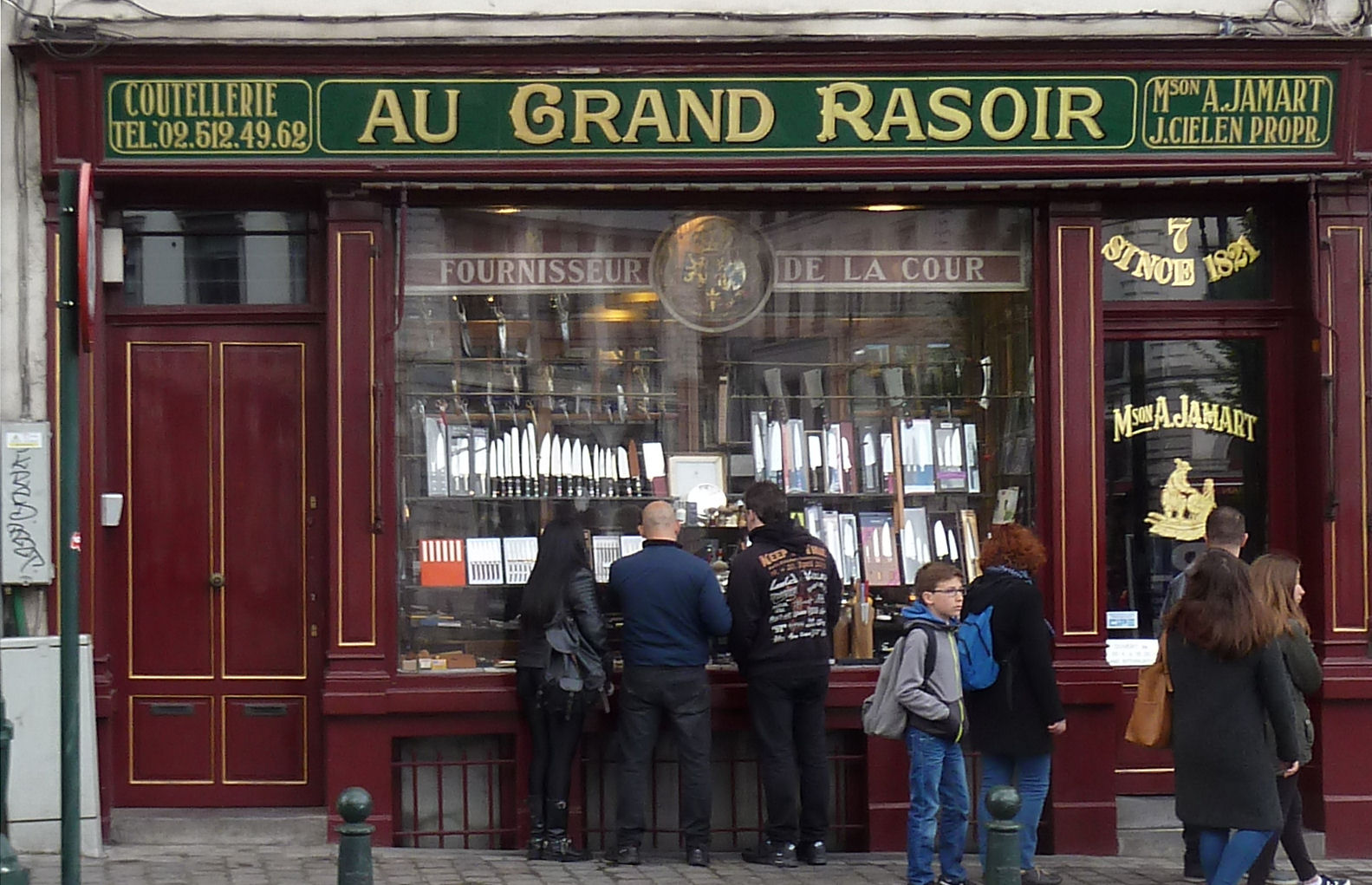
Au grand Rasoir

In Belgium the title of 'Purveyor to the Court' (Gebrevetteerd Hofleverancier van België/Fournisseur breveté de la Cour de Belgique) is granted to businesses who provide services or goods to the royal court. The list of 'purveyors to the Court' is updated every year. The king himself makes the decision who gets a title or not.

Some of the 'Purveyors to the Court' include:

- Armani
- BMW Belgium Luxembourg
- Mercedes-Benz Belgium Luxembourg
- Brussels Airlines
- Neuhaus
- Leonidas
- Godiva
- Jules Destrooper
- Delvaux
- Natan Couture

=== Denmark ===
Purveyors to the Royal Danish Court, though these are being phased out by 2029.

=== Japan ===
Purveyors to the Imperial Household Ministry; after World War II, the permission system was abolished, but purveyors still exist today:

- Ando Cloisonné Company – cloisonné
- Miyamoto Shoko – silverware
- Gekkeikan – sake
- Kikkoman – soy sauce
- Nissin Foods – food
- Toraya Confectionery – wagashi
- Toyota – motor vehicles
- Manyoken – catering
- Yamada Heiando – lacquerware
- Koransha – ceramic ware
- Kuni – perfume
- Otsuka Shoe – shoes
- Onshino Tabako – tobacco
- Onshino Konpeitō – konpeitō sweets

=== Monaco ===
High Patronage of the Monaco Royal Family:

- Chocolaterie de Monaco (chocolates)
- British Theatre Season, Monaco (theatre)
- Lexus (automobiles)
- Repossi (jewellery)

=== Netherlands ===
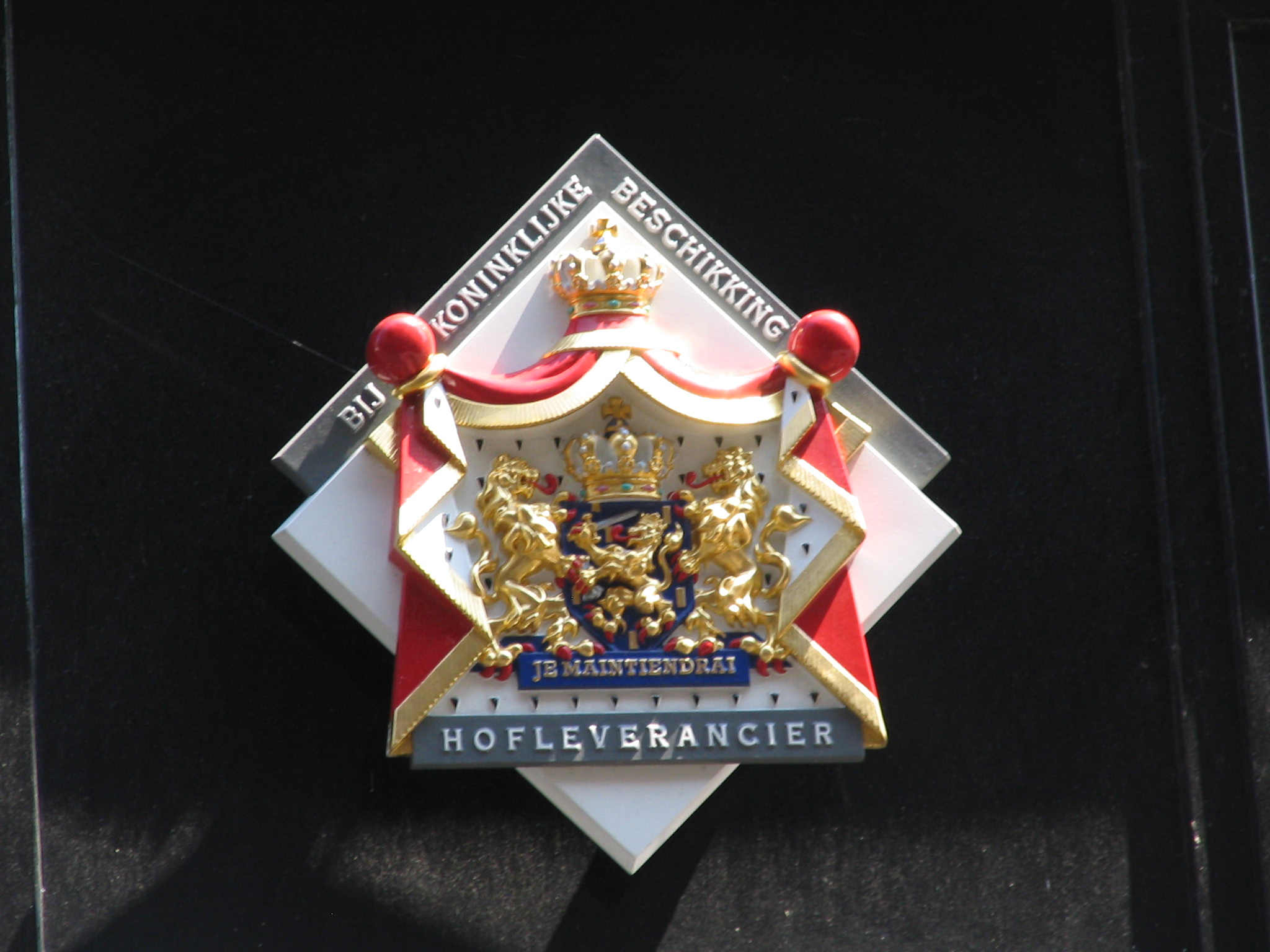
Hofleverancier sign displayed on a store

In the Netherlands, the status hofleverancier is awarded to small and medium-sized businesses that have existed for at least 100 years which have a good reputation regionally. However, the companies need not actually supply goods to the court. At present there are at least 387 companies that hold this status, which can be renewed every 25 years. Companies designated as hofleverancier are further permitted to display a plaque on their premises attesting to their status.

In addition, certain companies are granted the use of the designation koninklijke ("royal" in Dutch). These companies are also allowed to incorporate a crown in their logo. Examples include:

- KLM Royal Dutch Airlines
- KPN
- Royal Delft
- Royal Dutch Shell
- Royal Philips Electronics
- Royal Vopak
- Royal Dutch Football Association

=== Norway ===
Purveyors to the Royal Court of the Norway: the status 'purveyor to the court' (hofflevrandør) is no longer awarded.

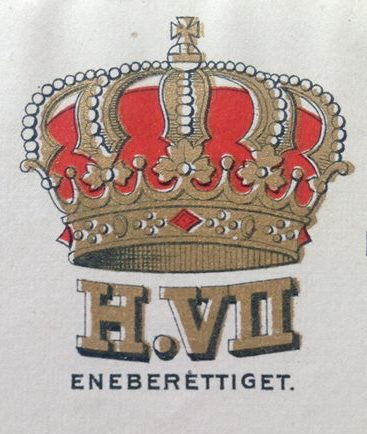
King Haakon crown on Foss brewery beer.

- Karl August Anderson – photographer (Kongl. Hoffotograf)
- Farris – mineral water
- Foss Bryggeri – Brewery (H.VII Eneberettiget)
- Hans H. Holm – Felt hats
- King Oscar – Sea food
- H. C. Reiersen – Tailor (Kongl. Hoffskredder)
- Christian Rohde & Søn – Tailor (Kngl. Norske slotts hoffleverandør)
- M. Selmer – photographer (Kongl. Hoffotograf)
- O. Sørensen Vogn- og Karosserifabrikk – Automobil
- L. Szaciński – photographer (Kongl. Hoffotograf)

=== Romania ===
Purveyors to the Romanian Royal House:

The wording reads: Purveyor to the Romanian Royal House, used since 2003 (and probably between 1923 and 1947)

- BMW
- Farina gegenüber – eau de Cologne to Carol I (1881)
- Steinway & Sons – pianos
- M. Welte & Söhne – orchestrions, reproducing pianos (1894, 1910)
- Murfatlar SA – wines to Michael (2003)
- Frottirex – bath towels and bedding to Michael (2005)
- Doina Levintza – clothing and accessories to Michael (2005)
- Dan Coma – clothing and accessories to Michael (2005)
- Halewood International – Rhein extra sparkling wines to Michael (2006)
- SC Transavia SA – chicken meat to Michael (2005)
- Principal Company SA – Salonta sausage products to Michael (2007)
- Biborţeni – mineral water to Michael (2008)
- Exotique Romania – Exotic furniture and decorative items (2009)
- Carol Parc Hotel – Hotelier and catering services (2011)
- Rue du Pain – Boulangerie Artisanale – bakery, pastry and confectionery products (2011)
- Bridge Painting Group – printing company, offset lithography, hot-foil stamping, embossing, and special finishings (2013)

=== Spain ===
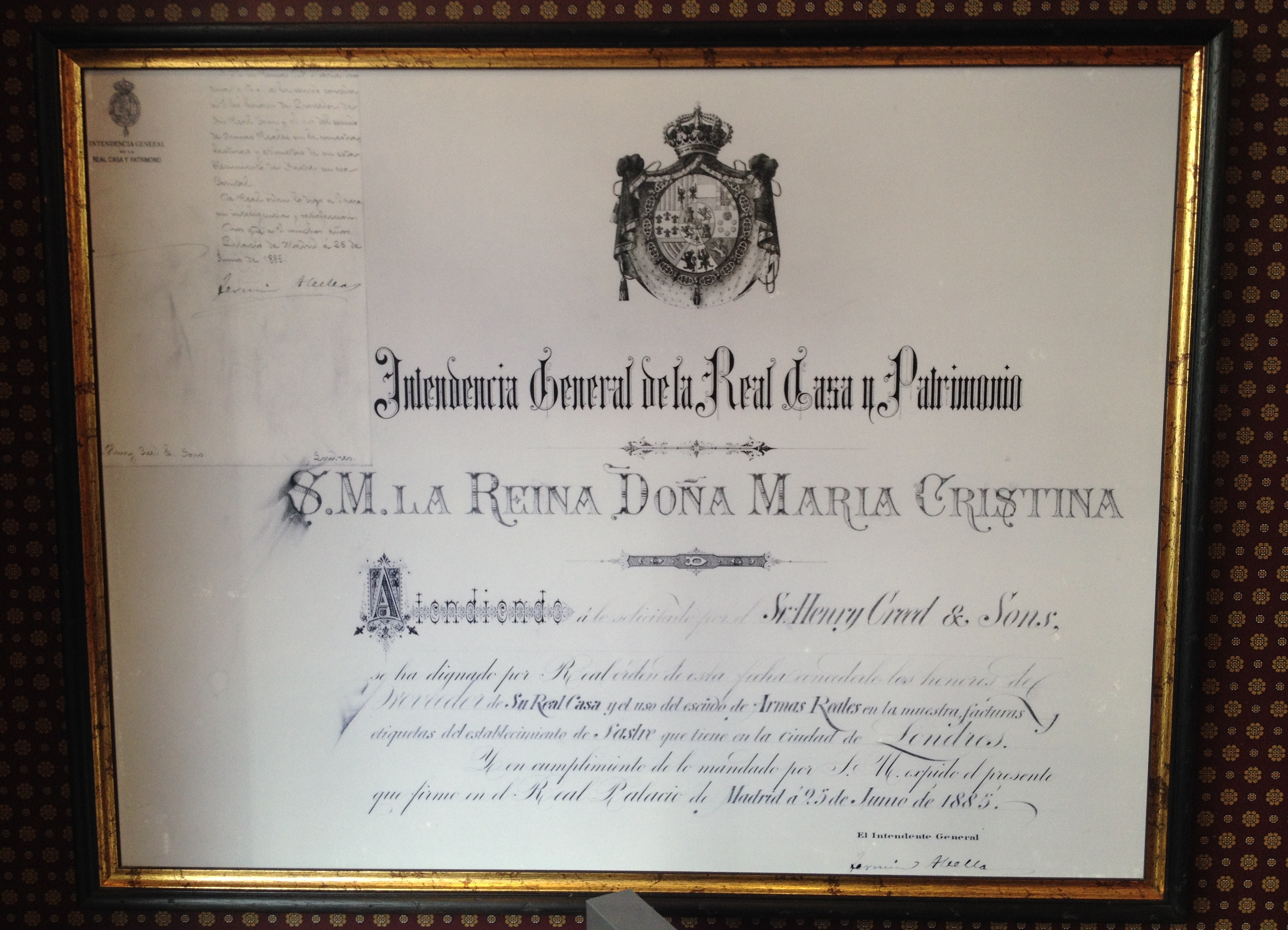
Royal Warrant of the Queen consort of Spain on Henry Creed & Sons, 1885

== Historical reigning households ==
=== Austria-Hungary ===
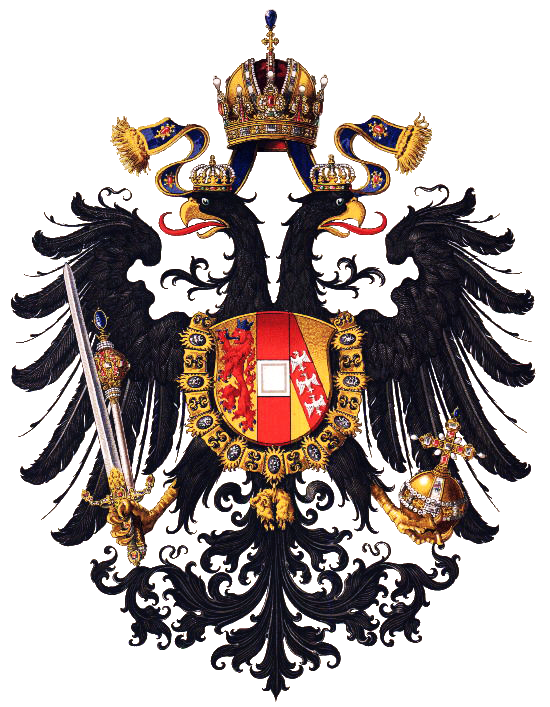
Purveyors to the Imperial and Royal Court were allowed to display the double-headed eagle.

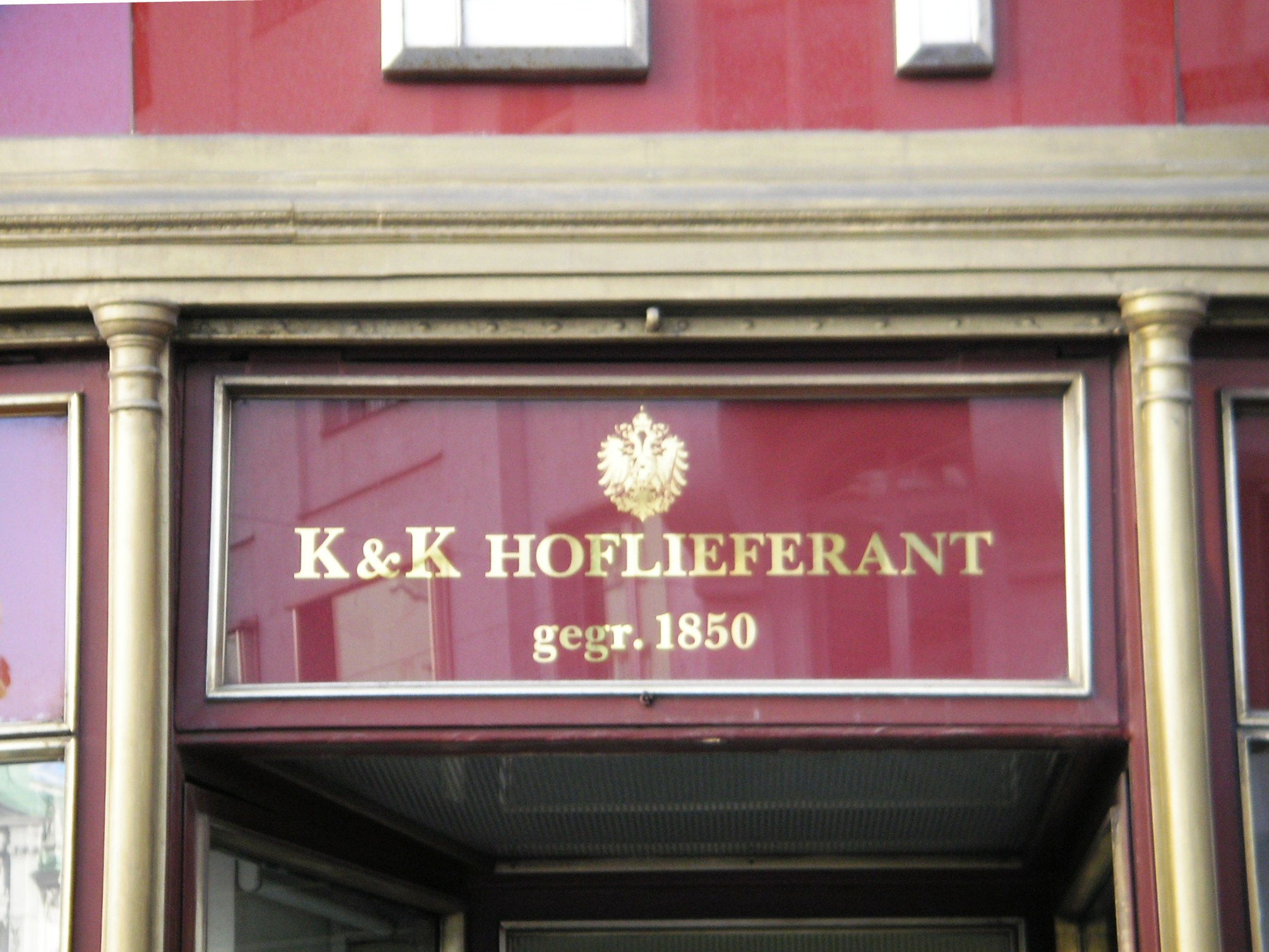
Imperial eagle displayed at the store of the purveyor Rudolf Waniek, in Vienna

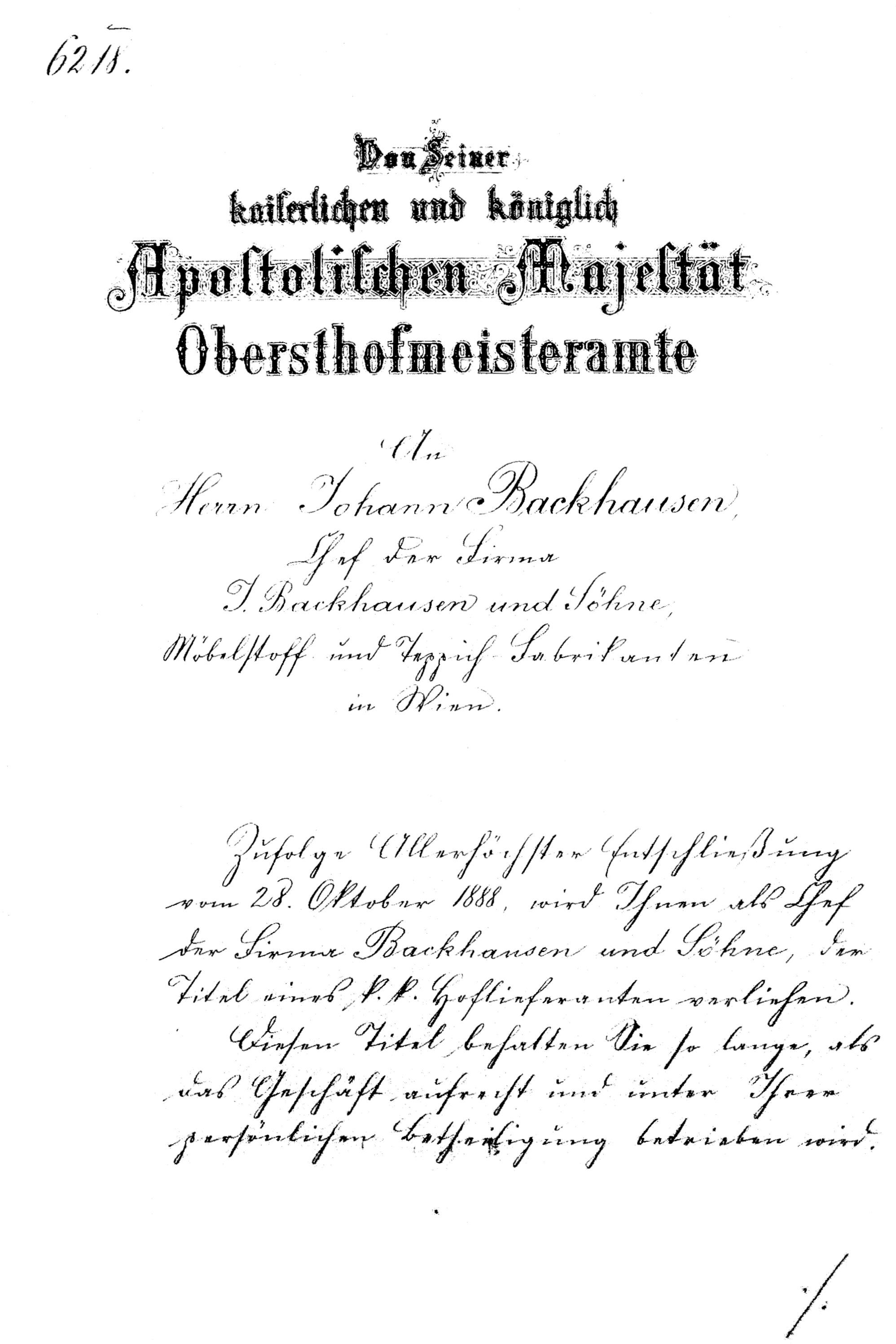
Imperial and royal warrant of appointment issued to Johann Backhausen on November 8, 1888

- Augarten porcelain – porcelain and china
- J. A. Baczewski – vodka
- Bakalowits – crystal chandeliers
- Matthäus Bauer – accordions
- Jan Becher – herbal bitter
- Lucas Bols – liqueurs
- Ignaz Bösendorfer – pianos
- Christofle – silverware
- Courvoisier – cognac
- Demel – chocolate and confectionery
- Farina gegenüber – eau de Cologne to Franz Joseph I (1872)
- E. Fessler – ovens
- Móric Fischer de Farkasházy, owner of Herend Porcelain Manufactory – porcelain
- Café Gerbeaud – cakes and pastries
- Gräf & Stift – carriages
- Hancocks & Co – jewelry
- L. & C. Hardtmuth – ovens and pencils
- Antoni Hawełka – catering
- J. A. Henckels – knives
- Hotel Imperial – catering
- Liebig's Extract of Meat Company – processed meats
- J. & L. Lobmeyr – crystal and glassware
- Löblich & Co. – heating
- Lohner-Werke – carriages
- Girolamo Luxardo – apéritif and digestif
- Rémy Martin – champagne
- Oswald Matthäus – beds and mattresses
- Moët et Chandon – champagne
- Moser – glass and crystal
- Ferdinand Mülhens, owner of the 4711 (brand) – perfume
- G. H. Mumm – champagne
- A. Obholzer Kürschnerei – furs
- L. Ostermayr – glass and porcelain
- Paulaner Brewery – beer
- J. Pauly & Sohn – beds and mattresses
- Peek Freans – cookies
- Pilsner Urquell – beer
- Rieger Orgelbau – organs
- Louis Roederer – champagne
- Royal Worcester – porcelain
- Eduard Sacher, owner of the Hotel Sacher – cakes and pastries
- Robert Schlumberger von Goldeck – sparkling wine
- Schweighofer – pianos
- Adolf Steiner – pianos
- William Steinway – pianos
- Carl Suchy & Söhne – watches
- Baron Raimund von Stillfried – photos
- Gebrüder Thonet – furniture
- Michael Thonet – furniture
- Charles Lewis Tiffany – jewelry and silverware
- Törley – sparkling wine
- Underberg – digestif bitter
- John Thomas Underwood – typewriters
- Veuve Clicquot – champagne
- Nathaniel Wheeler – sewing machines
- Wilhelm J. Sluka – cakes and pastries
- Zwack – herbal liquors

=== Bavaria ===
Purveyors to the Court of Bavaria:

See Liste bayerischer Hoflieferanten (in German).

- FA Ackermanns Kunstverlag – art publishing (1879)
- Ed Meier – shoes, clothes, leather goods and accessories
- Eilles – coffee and tea (1873)
- Farina gegenüber – eau de Cologne to Ludwig II (1872)
- Fr. Ant. Prantl – printing and leather goods (1797)

=== Brazil ===
Purveyors to the Brazilian Imperial Family:

- Casa Granado – chemists/pharmacists and toiletries
- Henry Poole & Co – tailors to Pedro II (1874)

=== France ===
Purveyors to the Court of France:

- Moutard – printer and bookseller to Marie Antoinette, to Princess Marie Joséphine of Savoy, and to Princess Maria Theresa of Savoy (1770)
- Marc-Etienne Janety – master goldsmith and jeweler to Louis XVI (1777)
- Adam Weisweiler – cabinet maker to Louis XVI (1778)
- Jean-Louis Fargeon – perfumer to Marie Antoinette (1779)
- Farina gegenüber – eau de Cologne to Napoleon I (1811) and to Napoleon III (1867)
- Debauve & Gallais – chocolates to Louis XVIII (1819)
- Champagne Delbeck – champagne to Louis Philippe I (1838)
- Guerlain – eau de Cologne to Napoleon III (1868)

=== India ===
Commercial honours and recognitions in the form of warrant appointments were issued by royal households of the Indian Princely States to purveyors of goods and services prior to the end of imperial rule in 1947. In recent years, former suzerain monarchies such as the House of Ghorpade have revived these institutions as programs to foster economic growth and encourage the patronage of small, independent, and local businesses.

=== Italy ===
Purveyors to the Italian Royal Family:

- Acqua di Biella – eau de Cologne to Umberto I (1878)
- Ballarino Gioielli (Cavour) – jewellery
- Baratti & Milano (Turin) – sweets
- Bianchi – cars
- Caffarel (Turin) – chocolate
- Caraceni (Milan) – clothes
- Fratelli Carli (Imperia) – olive oil
- Farina Gegenüber – eau de Cologne to King Victor Emmanuel II (1876)
- Florio (Marsala) – wine
- Gancia – wine
- Gentilini (Roma) – food (biscuits)
- Marinella (Naples) – ties
- Martini & Rossi – liquor
- Musy, Padre & Figli (Turin) – jewellery
- Pagani (Parma) – sweets
- Pernigotti – chocolate
- Petochi (Rome) – jewellery
- Prada (Milan) – leather goods, trunks and clothes
- Saiwa – food (biscuits)
- Sperlari – food (biscuits)
- Steinway & Sons – pianos
- Luigi Borrelli (Naples) – clothing

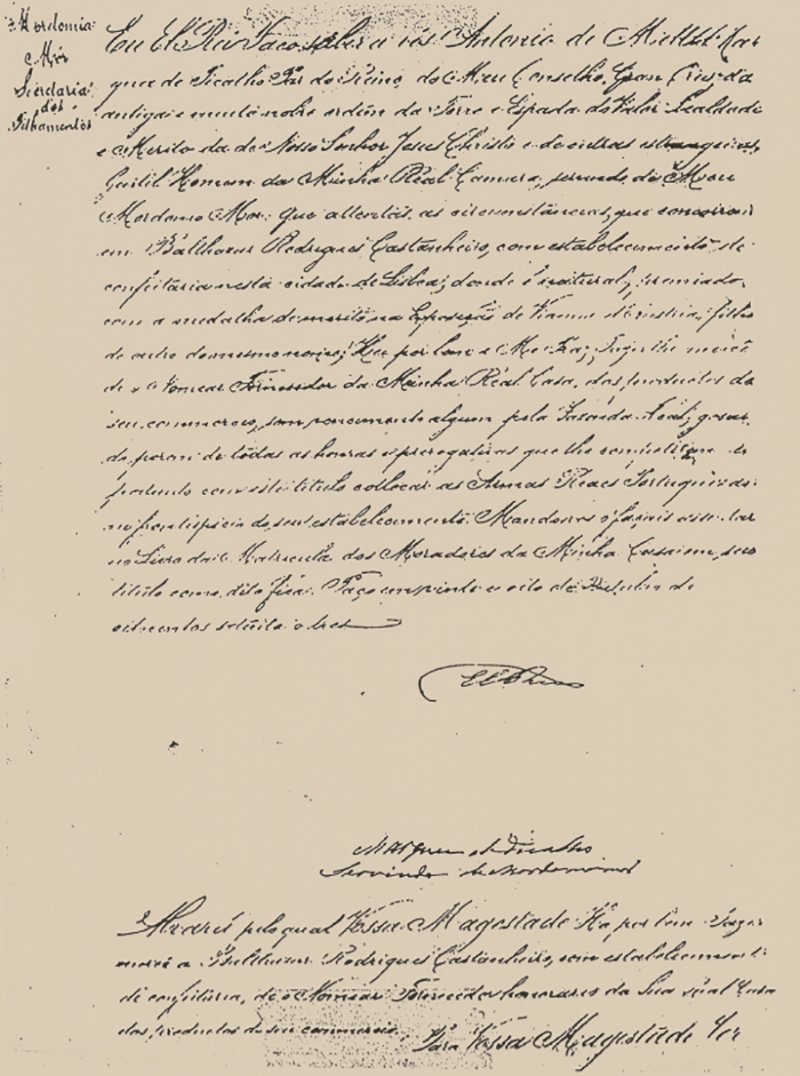
Royal warrant of appointment issued to Confeitaria Nacional on 28 October 1873

=== Ottoman Empire ===
Purveyors to the sultans of the Ottoman Empire:

- M. Welte & Söhne, orchestrions (1896)
- Abdullah Frères, photographers (1863)

=== Portugal ===
Purveyors to the Portuguese Royal Household:

- Ballarino Gioielli (Cavour, Italy) – jewellery
- Farina Gegenüber – eau de Cologne to Luís I (1866)
- Confeitaria Nacional – confectionary to Luís I, Carlos I, Manuel II (1873–1910)

=== Prussia ===
Purveyors to the Court of Prussia:

See Liste preußischer Hoflieferanten (in German).

- Farina gegenüber – eau de Cologne to Friedrich Wilhelm IV (1841), Wilhelm I (1871), to Friedrich III (1888) and to Wilhelm II (1888)

=== Russia ===
Coat of arms of the purveyors to the Imperial court

In the Russian Empire since 1856 there was the designation with the highest authorization "Supplier of His Imperial Majesty" with the state coat of arms on the shield. From 1895, at the request of Empress Alexandra Feodorovna, a second, additional authorization was granted: "Supplier of Her Imperial Majesty". Both authorizations existed until 1917, until the abdication of Nicholas II.

Purveyors to the Russian Imperial Family:

- Farina gegenüber – eau de Cologne to Nicholas I 1843
- Fabergé – jewellery to Nicholas II
- Smirnoff – vodka
- Cristal – champagne
- Steinway & Sons – pianos
- Gubanova Toiletries of Morshansk Russia appointed in 1763 with a Royal Warrant by Empress Catherine II to provide special cleaning and skincare products
- The Victoria Fine Soap Works, Minsk, Belarus – soap to Nicholas I and the Imperial family
- The Perfume Factory Partnership of Pharmacist A. M. Ostroumov – perfume, cologne, anti-dandruff soap and other medicinal cosmetics, 1900–1920

=== Sulu ===
Royal Warrants by Sultan Muedzul-Lail Tan Kiram:

- Harney & Sons – tea

=== Yugoslavia ===
Royal Warrant Holders of the Yugoslav Court:

- Sljeme (Zagreb) – trunks and leather goods, appointed in 1931
