= List of hotels: Countries R =

This is a list of what are intended to be the notable top hotels by country, five or four star hotels, notable skyscraper landmarks or historic hotels which are covered in multiple reliable publications. It should not be a directory of every hotel in every country:

== Romania ==
- Dacia Hotel, Satu Mare
- Hotel Continental Sibiu

=== Bucharest ===
- Athénée Palace
- Bucharest World Trade Center
- Carol Parc Hotel
- Casa Capșa
- Hotel Pullman Bucharest
- InterContinental Bucharest
- Rin Grand Hotel

== Russia ==
=== Moscow ===
- Golden Ring Hotel
- Hotel Leningradskaya
- Hotel Metropol
- Hotel Moskva
- Izmailovo Hotel
- Lotte Hotel Moscow
- Radisson Royal Hotel
- Rossiya Hotel
- Savoy Hotel
- Swissôtel Krasnye Holmy Moscow

=== Murmansk ===
- Hotel Arctic

=== St. Petersburg ===
- Angleterre Hotel
- Corinthia Hotel St. Petersburg
- Grand Hotel Europe
- Hotel Astoria (Saint Petersburg)
- Lobanov-Rostovsky Residence

== Rwanda ==
- Hôtel des Mille Collines, Kigali
- Chez Lando, Kigali
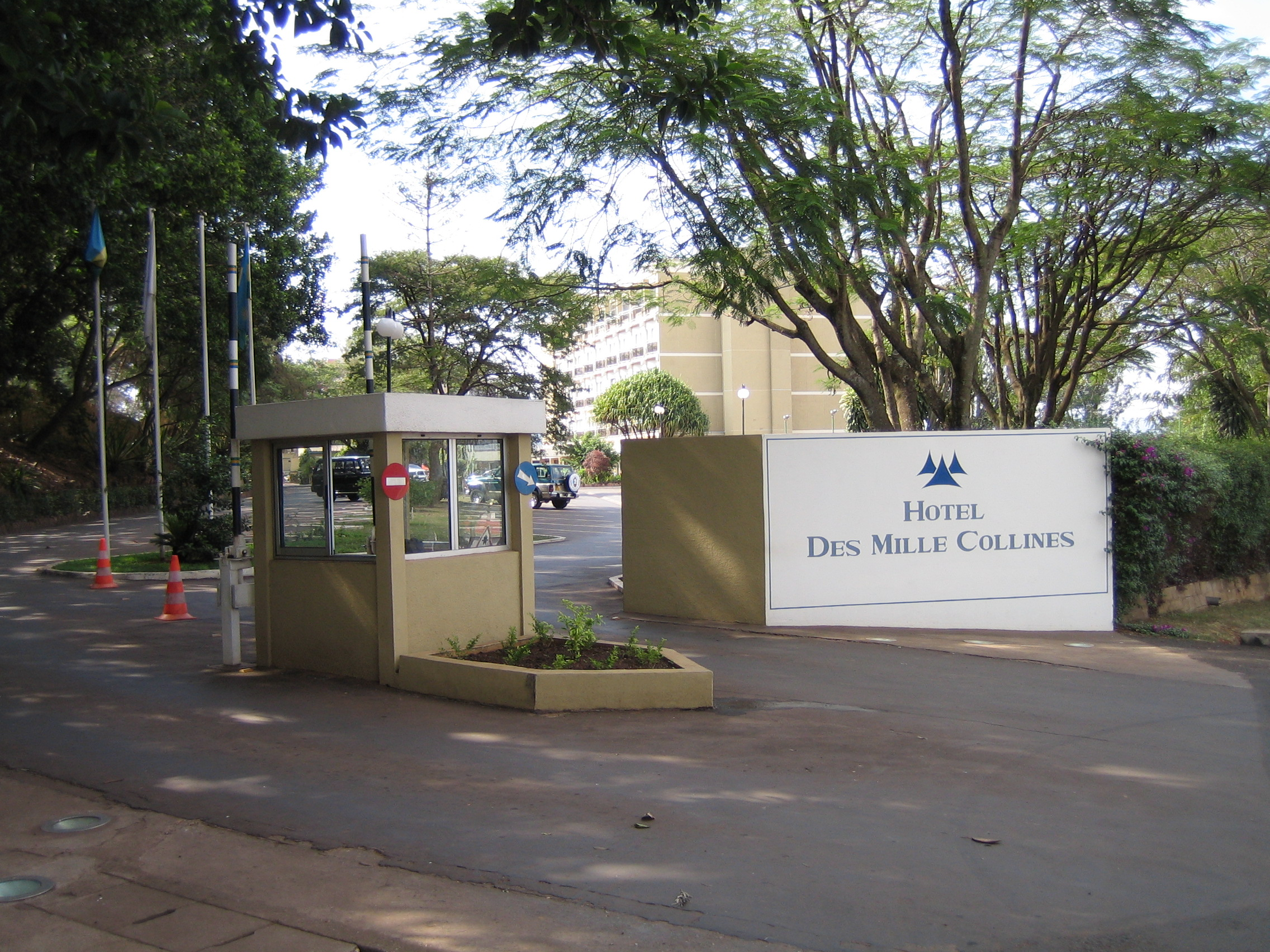
Hôtel des Mille Collines
