= Claire Malcolm =

British menswear designer (born 1982)

- Born: Claire Louise Malcolm; 27 July 1982 (age 44); Tunbridge Wells, Kent, England
- Education: Staplehurst School
- Alma mater: Middlesex University
- Label: Hardy Amies
- Awards: Best Menswear Award, BFA

Claire Louise Malcolm (born 27 July 1982 in Tunbridge Wells, Kent) is an English menswear designer and is a designer on Savile Row. Malcolm graduated from Middlesex University with a BA degree in Fashion Design.

== Early career ==
=== Kim Jones ===
In 2006, Malcolm began working for English designer Kim Jones. Malcolm helped produce four collections for his main line, Kim by Kim Jones. This collection was shown in New York City in February 2007, during the Men's Collections show. Malcolm has also assisted and collaborated with Nicola Formichetti, Andre Walker, i-D Magazine, V Man, 10 Men and Arena Homme. She has also worked with Savile Row tailors Norton & Sons.

=== Kanye West (Pastelle) ===
Between 2008 and 2009, Malcolm helped develop the fashion line, "Pastelle" for Kanye West.

=== E.Tautz ===
In 2009, Malcolm moved permanently to Savile Row, working for Patrick Grant of Norton & Sons as the designer for his E.Tautz label, a forgotten military brand from which Grant wanted to develop a ready-to-wear branch of his tailoring house. Between 2009 and 2010, Malcolm designed both the SS10 and AW10 collections, subsequently winning E.Tautz the award for "Best Menswear" at the British Fashion Awards 2010.

=== Hardy Amies ===
In 2010, Malcolm was offered the position of Designer at the British fashion brand, Hardy Amies on Savile Row, presenting her first Salon show at London Fashion Week AW11. Malcolm drew on the period of Hardy Amies' life when he was a prominent figure on the European society circuit in the 1930s:

The label is now firmly back on the fashion map with a feel of Tom Ford about it, but with an English twist. These are leisure clothes in luxury fabrics such as the structured and unstructured blazers in Prince of Wales and windowpane check and midnight blue tuxedos with silk crêpe-de-chine shirts.
