= Edegger-Tax =

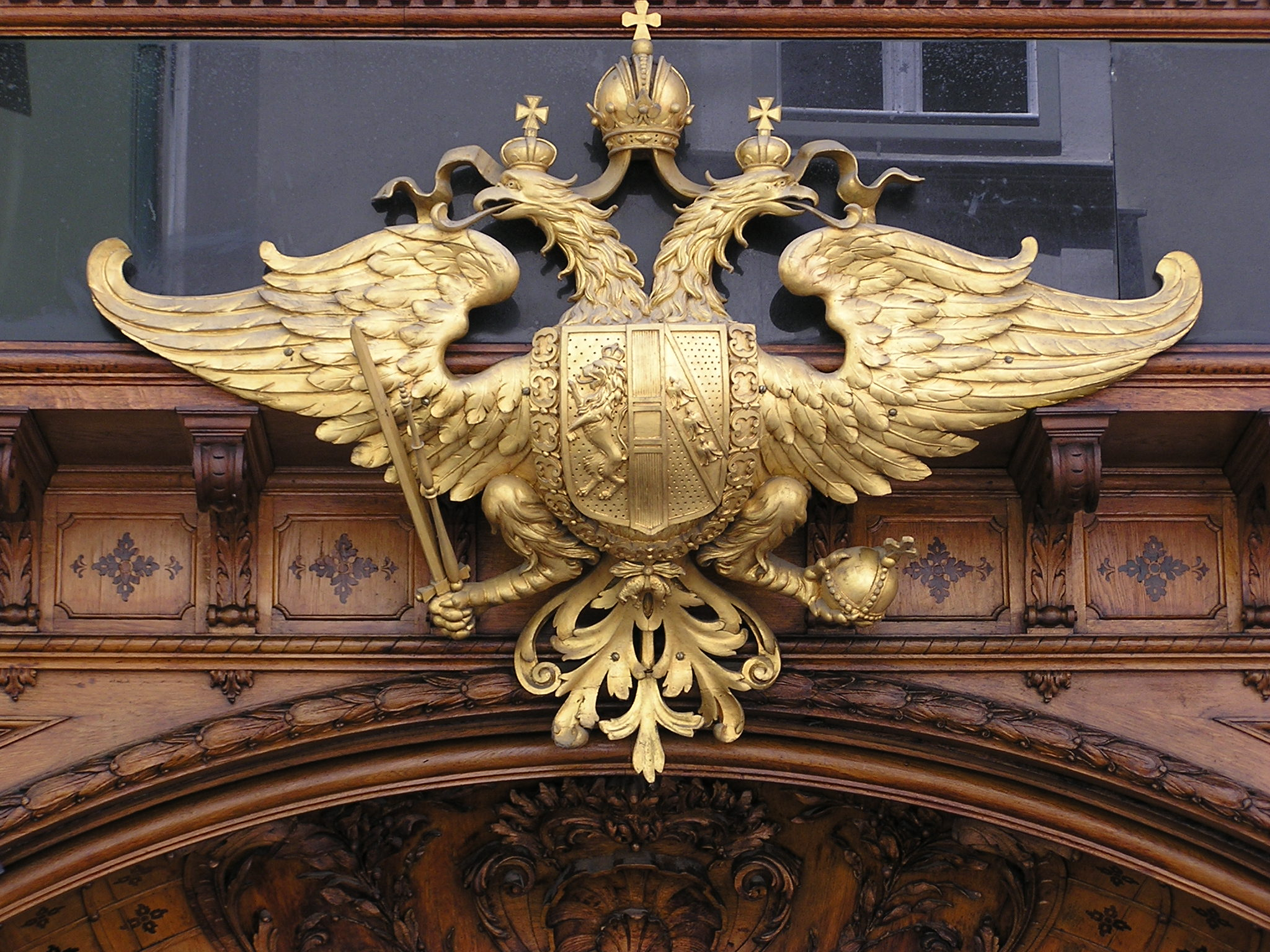
- Native name: Hofbäckerei Edegger-Tax
- Industry: Bakery
- Founded: 1569
- Headquarters: Hofgasse 6, A 8010 Graz, Austria
- Key people: Robert Edegger (director)
- Website: www.hofbaeckerei.at

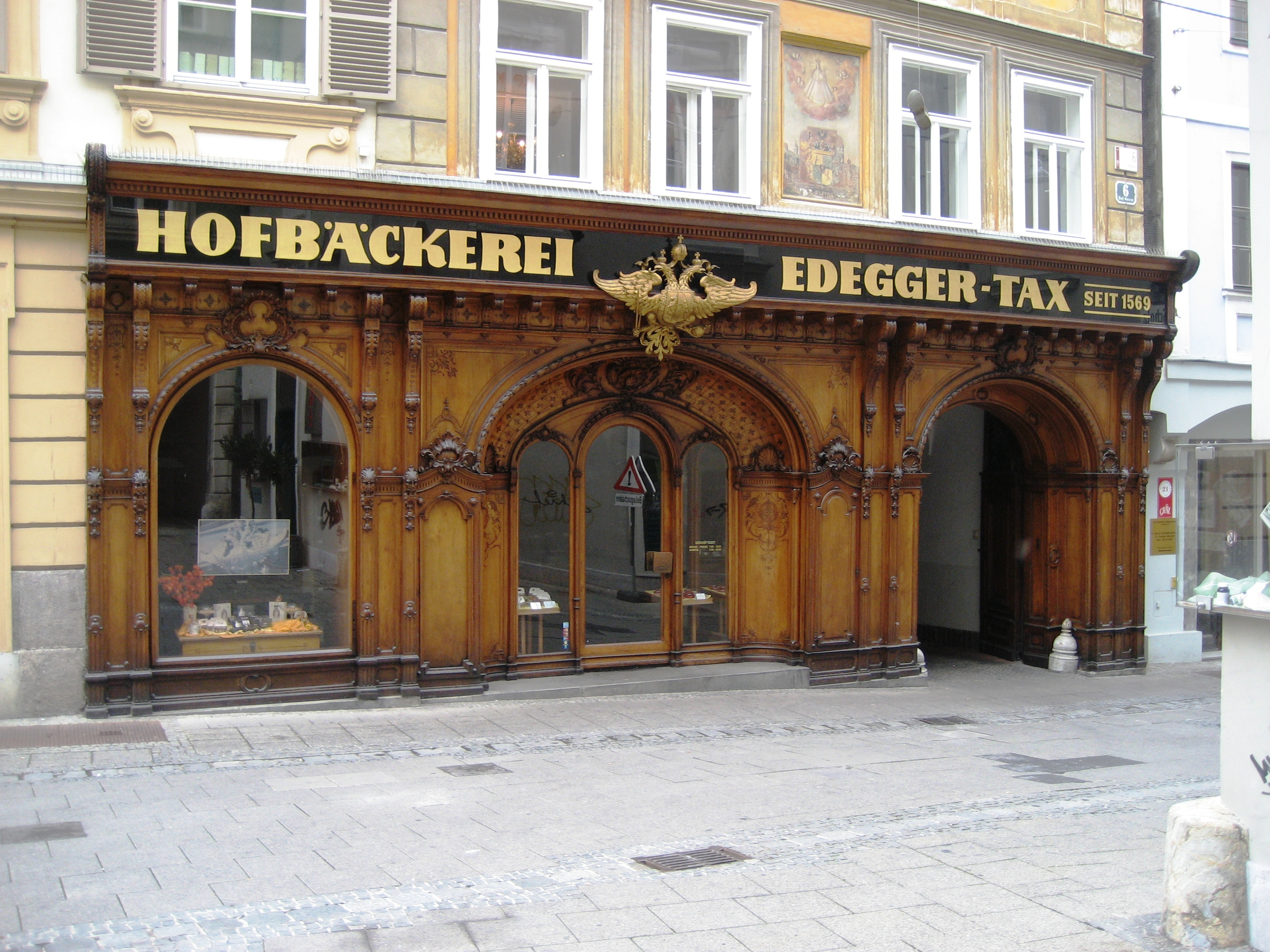
Hofbäckerei Edegger-Tax

Hofbäckerei Edegger-Tax is the oldest operating bakery in Graz, Austria, founded in 1569. The bakery is famous for its decorated shop facade on the Hofgasse street.

== History ==
The original site of the bakery was at Sporgasse 15 near today's Stiegenkirche. It was first mentioned in 1569, though the building probably dated back to the 14th century.

In 1787 Mathias Tax bought the bakery and in 1880 Franz Tax III moved it to its current location and made it a prestigious bakery. During the visit of Emperor Franz Joseph to Graz in 1883, the Tax bakery supplied the royal court. Due to the quality of its products, the bakery received an Imperial and Royal Warrant of Appointment in 1888.

The carved wooden shop portal that has been preserved to this day was made by the carpenter Anton Irschik from Graz in 1896.

In 1940s Franz Edegger married Herta Tax and succeeded in reviving the bakery. After that, Erich Edegger, who was also the mayor of Graz, and his wife Walheide continued the tradition of the bakery. Today the company is run by his son Robert Edegger.

The product range includes traditional bakery products from the times of the Austro-Hungarian monarchy and also special products for celiac disease. Specialties include the bread 'Sissi-Busserl', Styrian 'Panthertatzen', imperial rusks, etc. Edegger-Tax is the only shop in Japan selling the bread that was supplied to the House of Habsburg in Austria.
