= Sommerhuber =

- Native name: Sommerhuber GmbH
- Industry: Ceramics
- Founded: 1491
- Headquarters: Resthofstrasse 69, 4400 Steyr, Upper Austria, Austria
- Key people: Rudolf Christian Sommerhuber
- Number of employees: about 120
- Website: www.sommerhuber.com

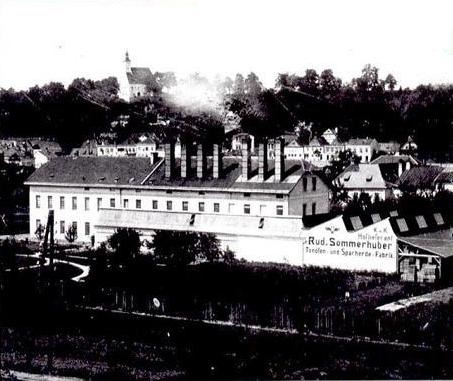
Sommerhuber clay oven factory in 1910

Sommerhuber is a traditional ceramics producer from Steyr city, Austria founded in 1491. It produces tiles for tiled stoves and tile chimneys and the heat ceramics for the spas. The company was an Imperial and Royal Warrant of Appointment.

== History ==
The ceramics manufactory Sommerhuber was first mentioned in 1491, when its name was Wärmprecht. In 1843, Josef Sommerhuber (1817-1881) married the owner of the hut, and the name Sommerhuber was transferred to the craft business. His son Rudolf (1858-1935) took over the business after his father.

Produced were stoves for the nobility, citizens and the peasants in baroque, renaissance and gothic style. Sommerhuber was allowed to equip the imperial palaces in Persenbeug and Nieder- Wallsee, and the offices in the entire monarchy.

Customers abroad were Prince Arnulf of Bavaria, Prince Joachim of Prussia and Duke Albrecht of Bavaria. Also the royal castle Cotroceni in Romania was equipped by Sommerhuber.

For this achievement Sommerhuber was appointed to the Imperial court supplier in 1900. At the Paris World Exposition in 1910, the company received the Silver Medal. In 1910, the company became the court supplier of Prince Ludwig Gaston of Saxe-Coburg and Gotha.

Rudolf Sommerhuber worked together with famous artists such as Saibl, Barwig, Obsieger and Michael Powolny and designed the tiles of them. This tradition is also carried on today by collaboration with artists like Gerald Brandstötter.

The collapse of the monarchy in 1918 hit Sommerhuber, as an important sales market erupted. Nevertheless, the company continued to hold its own. During the Second World War, the company had to cease production and was largely spared the war. Nevertheless, the resumption of production on the basis of a lack of raw materials after 1945 was slow.

In 1973, the company received the Bavarian Handicrafts Prize in Gold at the Handwerksmesse in Munich.

New products such as the ceramic electronic storage have been developed. The oil crisis of the 1970s led to a strongly growing demand for wood-fired tiled stoves.

In 1980, was built a new factory in Resthofstrasse, where the headquarters of the Sommerhuber manufactory are located. The production of interior ceramics and the wholesale trade, which were taken up in the 1980s, were abandoned for economic reasons. Sommerhuber concentrated on the heat ceramics.

The company has been managed since 1993 by Rudolfs Ururenkel Christian (IV.) Sommerhuber (* 1959).

Since 1998, the Sommerhuber manufactory has increasingly devoted itself to the development of large ceramics (with a length of up to 135 cm). Since 2005, the enJOY product line has also been offering heat ceramics for the spa sector in the form of electrically heated heaters, seats and benches as well as ceramic foot basins.

The Sommerhuber manufactory currently employs around 120 people.

== See also ==
- List of oldest companies
