= Liverpool Vienna Bakery Kirkland Brothers =

Former bakery located on 13 Hardman Street in Liverpool, England

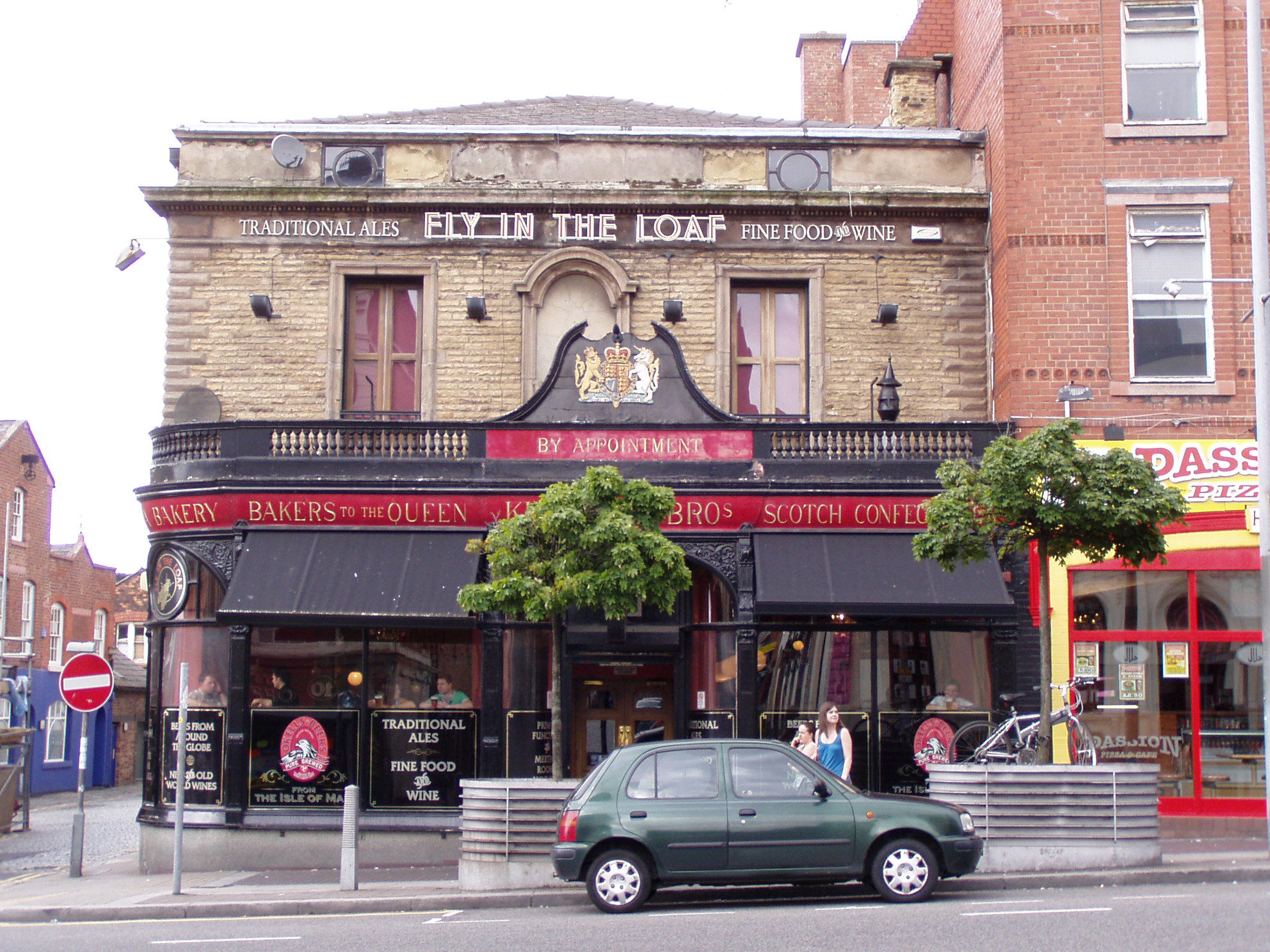
The former Liverpool Vienna Bakery Kirkland Brothers (2009)

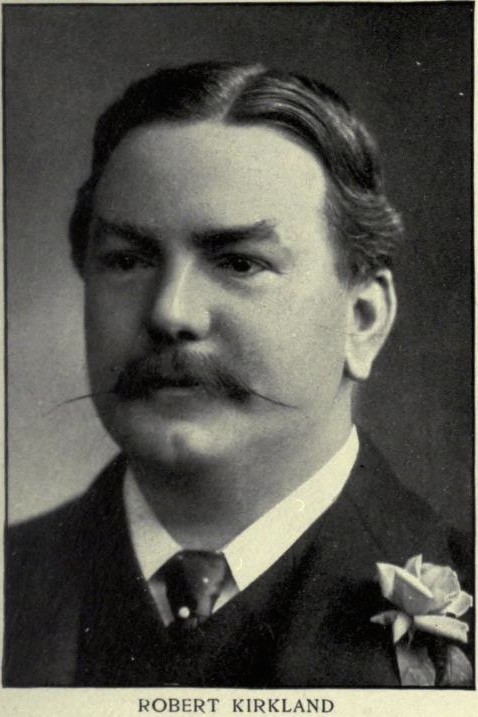
Robert Kirkland

The Liverpool Vienna Bakery Kirkland Brothers is a former bakery located on 13 Hardman Street in Liverpool, England.

Robert Kirkland, born at Airdrie in 1853, gave up banking to join his brother in this baking and catering business. He was chairman of that business, and chairman of Fletcher's Limited in Birmingham. He was given a royal warrant of appointment as baker to Queen Victoria, with authority to use the Royal Arms, and the King of Spain and an Imperial and Royal Warrant of Appointment to the Emperor of Austria . He was President of the National Association of Master Bakers in 1890–91.

The bakery continued to exist until the 1970s and was turned into a pub called Fly in the Loaf in the late 1990s.

The exterior of the former bakery featured in The Young Indiana Jones Chronicles episode "Love's Sweet Song".
