= Community Clothing =

British clothing brand and manufacturer

- Industry: Sustainable fashion
- Founded: 2016
- Founder: Patrick Grant
- Headquarters: Blackburn, Lancashire, United Kingdom
- Products: Clothing
- Website: communityclothing.co.uk

Community Clothing is a British clothing brand founded in 2016 by Scottish designer Patrick Grant. The company is based in Blackburn, Lancashire, and produces a line of clothing staples using ethically sourced materials, in order to provide consistent employment for a co-operative of British mills and factories and reduce clothing waste.

== History ==
Clothing and textile factories in the United Kingdom, which boomed during the Industrial Revolution, began declining in the mid 20th-century due to cheaper overseas production, the rise of fast fashion, and lack of investment in the industry. The number of people employed in clothing manufacturing in Britain declined from 1.4 million in the 1970s to only 50,000 in the 2020s. Additionally, the fashion industry, whose seasonal business model typically keeps factories busy only twice a year, left significant gaps of downtime for mills.

In 2015, Patrick Grant purchased Blackburn factory Cookson & Clegg, which was facing closure after losing their contract with the British military in 2009. Grant purchased the company, which was founded in 1860 and had been a long-time supplier to his Savile Row tailoring house Norton & Sons. However, he was unable to keep the factory afloat after losing a contract with a major retailer, and Cookson & Clegg went into voluntary liquidation in March 2016.

Grant's solution to revive Cookson & Clegg and other struggling clothing factories was to create a line of clothing basics manufactured year-round at a co-operative of factories. Grant raised more than £88,000 in a Kickstarter campaign in early 2016 to launch the enterprise, with the first orders made at Cookson & Clegg.

The company began sales in partnership with eBay in September 2016, and opened a physical store in Blackburn in October 2016. The store closed during the COVID-19 pandemic. The company launched their own e-commerce site in 2018.

In 2018, Grant delivered a TED Talk about the fashion industry and Community Clothing.

Community Clothing menswear began selling at retailer John Lewis in Spring 2021.

In 2022, the company supplied the opening ceremony uniforms for the English team during the 2022 Commonwealth Games in Birmingham, as part of Team England's commitment to ethical production and sustainability. The uniforms, consisting of a red blazer, white T-shirt and khakhi chinos, were manufactured within 100 miles of Birmingham. The outfit was designed to be reworn after the Games; the blazer featured a removable velcro Team England badge buttons along with other badges to allow the athletes to customise their kits.

== Business model ==
Community Clothing was founded as a social enterprise to address the poverty caused by the decline in the British clothing industry and to fill the gap at clothing factories caused by the seasonality of the fashion industry. The company's goal is to provide skilled employment to allow factories to stay in business and expand, and encourage a more sustainable model for consuming clothes. The clothes are manufactured in more than 30 factories in the UK, including in six of the most economically deprived areas of the country.

Community Clothing's business model is to sell high-quality wardrobe basics with minimal overhead costs and a shorter supply chain to increase affordability for consumers. The styles are not continually redesigned, leading to less expense and less waste of unused stock, with the goal to promote sustainability via long-term wear. Community Clothing also uses "deadstock" materials — unsold fabric that otherwise would have gone to waste. The company's website states where they source their raw materials, yarn, cloth, and finished product.

The company sells directly to consumers online and mainly markets using social media, and uses members of the local community as models, with their own hair and makeup. The company states their markup is 30 per cent of that of comparable brands and their marketing expenditures do not exceed 5 per cent of their budget.

Community Clothing also holds pop-up shops, including at Selfridges department stores.

Community Clothing does not put their clothes on sale or participate in Black Friday or other discount promotions.

== Logo and branding ==
The company's logo is based on the CC41 logo introduced in 1941 by the British Board of Trade. The CC41 logo was stamped on products to indicate affordability during a time of austerity.

The company's motto is Making Clothes, Creating Jobs, Restoring Pride.
