= E. Tautz & Sons =

Men's clothing brand

E. Tautz
- Industry: Retail
- Founded: 1867; 159 years ago
- Founder: Edward Tautz
- Headquarters: London, United Kingdom
- Key people: Patrick Grant (Creative Director)
- Products: Menswear
- Website: etautz.com

E. Tautz & Sons was a men's clothing brand founded on Oxford Street, London, in 1867 as Edward Tautz & Sons. It specialised in sportswear and trousers. The brand was acquired in 2005 by Patrick Grant and focused on sportswear and casualwear, manufacturing many of its products in the United Kingdom, but was wound up voluntarily on 21 February 2022.

== History ==
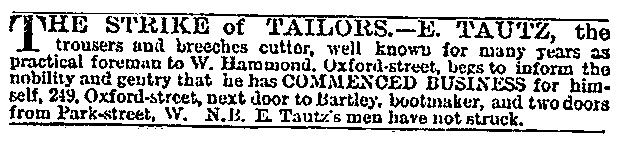
Advertisement. The Times, 14 May 1867.

Edward Tautz founded E. Tautz in 1867 in London's prosperous West End. The store was located at 249 Oxford Street in London, renumbered at the end of the 19th century as 485 Oxford Street.

Tautz had been head cutter (foreman) at London's renowned sporting tailor's Hammond & Co., on Oxford Street before leaving to establish his own business.

In 1875, the business changed its name to E. Tautz & Sons as Edward brought his son Frederick George Tautz into the business.

Specialized in "the hunting-field and military men", Edward Tautz was particularly known as a specialist of breeches. He fought to protect his business from counterfeiters. In 1886, he proved, in court, his design of an original style of knickerbocker breeches.

Between 1895 and 1897, Winston Churchill had purchased clothes from the company for a sum totalling £144, which was then identified as "breeches and trousers makers, military tailors". In 1898, the Oxford Street store of Tautz, then a "wholesale tailor", was "hopelessly" destroyed by a fire. The company announced two days later "their premises were completely destroyed".

Anthony J Drexel Biddle was a customer of Tautz.

In 1968, the label was acquired by the Savile Row firm of Norton & Sons.

In 2005, Patrick Grant acquired Norton & Sons, with a background in telecommunications and "no fashion or tailoring experience". The "long-forgotten" brand E. Tautz was relaunched by Norton & Sons as a ready-to-wear collection in 2009, with the collaboration of British designers Kim Jones, Giles Deacon, Richard Nicoll and Christopher Kane.

Patrick Grant said his focus was on "simple pieces, made by hand, manufactured in the U.K. I don't come from a fashion background," and it was essentially about clothes he wanted to wear. The company claimed to mix "Savile Row cutting... with the sporting and military traditions". It also sold shirts, trousers, outerwear and accessories such as hats and scarves.
