= Patrick Grant (designer) =

Scottish clothier and businessman (born 1972)

- Born: Patrick James Grant; 1 May 1972 (age 54); Edinburgh, Scotland
- Education: University of Leeds; New College, Oxford
- Occupations: Clothier, businessman, author
- Labels: Norton & Sons; E. Tautz & Sons; Community Clothing
- Awards: Menswear Designer award at the British Fashion Awards 2010

Patrick James Grant FRSA (born 1 May 1972) is a Scottish clothier, businessman, television personality and author who is currently the director of Community Clothing and textile manufacturer Cookson & Clegg. He is the former director of bespoke tailors Norton & Sons of Savile Row and E. Tautz & Sons clothing line. Since 2013, he has been a judge on the BBC One reality series The Great British Sewing Bee. In 2025, he was installed as the Chancellor of Edinburgh’s Queen Margaret University.

After taking over Norton & Sons in 2005, Grant has been credited with rejuvenating the once ailing business. He relaunched E. Tautz & Sons as a ready to wear label in 2009, for which he was awarded the Menswear Designer award at the British Fashion Awards in 2010.

Grant is a critic of the fashion industry, particularly the environmental damage caused by fast fashion and synthetic clothing. His book Less: Stop Buying So Much Rubbish — How Having Fewer, Better Things Can Make Us Happier was published by HarperCollins in May 2024.

== Early life and education ==
Grant was born in Edinburgh, and raised in the city's Morningside district. His Musselburgh-born father, James (1940–2020), managed the pop band Marmalade before becoming an accountant at RMJM and mini rugby coach. His mother, Susan, worked for the University of Edinburgh. His maternal grandfather, Flt. Lt. Walter Henry Ewen FitzEarle of Rosskeen, was killed in action in the Second World War when his plane was shot down while flying for the Royal Air Force; Grant keeps his wardrobe trunk, which had previously belonged to his great-grandfather Walter FitzEarle, the bandmaster of the King's Own Scottish Borderers, in his design studio. His other grandfather worked as a yarn designer in Galashiels, Scottish Borders. He has a younger sister, Victoria, who works for his businesses.

Grant attended South Morningside Primary School, then Edinburgh Academy before joining Barnard Castle School as a boarding pupil. Grant explained that "My parents thought it would be better for me to be away from home. They have good friends who live not far from Barnard Castle and their two sons were there. So they knew the school and said it was good for rugby and I was mad on rugby." Whilst at Barnard Castle he represented Scotland at rugby union at U18 and U19 level. He took a gap year after school and played for West Hartlepool R.F.C., although his rugby career was cut short by a shoulder injury. Grant lists his early fashion influences as Barbour, Burberry, Hunter, Lyle & Scott and Pringle.

Grant completed a degree in materials science at the University of Leeds in 1994. He chose an engineering degree because of "a fascination with how things are made". His course included a year spent at the University of Orleans.

Following graduation Grant relocated to the United States where he worked as a ski instructor, as a counsellor at a summer camp in Santa Cruz, California, as a nanny, a landscape gardener, and a model agent. He returned to Britain in 1995 to take up a career in marketing, first at cable-makers BICC and Corning, before moving to optical components manufacturer Bookham Technology in 2000. From 2004, Grant studied for an MBA degree, funded by Bookham, at Saïd Business School, University of Oxford, where he was a member of New College. His thesis, completed in October 2005, concerned the regeneration of luxury fashion brands such as Burberry, and was titled "Is Burberry's formula for brand revitalisation replicable?".

== Career ==
=== Norton & Sons ===
Whilst at Saïd in 2005, Grant learned that Norton & Sons was being advertised for sale by the Granger family. To pursue the sale, he accepted voluntary redundancy from Bookham. He was surprised at how low the asking price was, commenting: "You could pay more for a car. We're not talking millions but hundreds of thousands of pounds." Grant was able to afford the business by selling his house, his car "and everything else" as well as borrowing from a bank and raising money from friends; two former Oxford classmates, friends from Leeds, his grandmother, and his former chief executive at Bookham. The deal was completed in December 2005.

Grant stated: "It was a business in terrible shape; a wonderful artisanal tailor not making the best of its assets." Over three years, he managed to rejuvenate the business by focusing on its heritage and increasing innovation and enthusiasm among management. The company had attempted to diversify by selling guns and offering sporting tours; Grant re-concentrated the business on tailoring. By 2011, Norton's customer base had increased from around 20 customers in 2005, to several hundred, tripling the number of suits made. The business made a small profit in 2010 and tripled revenue. Revenue for all his businesses approached £75 million a year in 2018.

Following the COVID-19 pandemic, Grant sold the majority stake of Norton & Sons to James Sleater, owner of Savile Row tailor the Cad & the Dandy, and Ian Meiers. Grant remains a minority stake holder in the company.

=== E. Tautz & Sons ===
Grant relaunched the defunct Norton subsidiary E. Tautz & Sons in 2009 as a ready-to-wear brand. In recognition for his work with Tautz, he was named Menswear Designer of 2010 at the British Fashion Awards. The label is a large component of the Norton business, with particular success in Asia. The label tended to be more experimental than the Norton line, with Grant explaining that with Tautz "We don't need to be wedded too much to the idea of the tailored suit."

E. Tautz appeared at London Fashion Week Men's spring/summer show in January 2020, but went out of business in 2021 due to the COVID-19 pandemic.

=== Hammond & Co ===
In April 2013, it was announced that Grant would be relaunching the Norton subsidiary Hammond & Co. as a diffusion line available exclusively at British clothing retailer Debenhams. The line was extremely successful but the retailer closed its stores in 2021.

=== Cookson & Clegg ===
In 2015, Grant purchased Blackburn clothing manufacturer Cookson & Clegg, saving the factory from closure. Cookson & Clegg was founded in 1860. The firm began as leather curriers and manufacturers of boot uppers. By the 1930s they were producing jerkins, flying helmets and other leather products for the British Army. Throughout the later part of the 20th century Cookson & Clegg were a major supplier of military outerwear, legwear and other sewn products to the British Army and other armed forces. Today the firm manufactures outerwear, in both traditional woven and modern technical fabrics, jeans, and chinos for some UK clothing brands.

=== Community Clothing ===
In 2016 Grant launched the sustainable clothing brand Community Clothing, a social enterprise and manufacturers co-operative based in Blackburn, which produces a line of clothing staples in order to provide consistent employment at British clothing mills and factories, while reducing clothing waste.

=== Other fashion work ===
Grant worked with Barbour as Creative Director of their Beacon Heritage line in October 2012.

== Media work ==
Grant is best known by the general public for his work as a judge on the BBC television series The Great British Sewing Bee. He has appeared in the British editions of GQ and Esquire magazines. He has appeared as a guest on BBC television and radio programmes, such as Breakfast, Countryfile , Springwatch and Steve Wright in the Afternoon.

In May 2023, Grant presented the documentary Coronation Tailors: Fit for a King (BBC Two) about the preparation of military dress on display during the Coronation of King Charles III. The documentary focused on the family-run business Kashket & Partners, which made more than 6,000 uniforms for the parade.

== Awards ==
In 2013 Grant was made an Honorary Professor in Business at Glasgow Caledonian University. He was elected a Fellow of the Royal Society of Arts (FRSA) in 2016. In 2017, he was awarded an Honorary Doctorate by Heriot Watt University's School of Textiles and Design. In 2018, he was named co-chair of the Prince of Wales' charity Future Textiles, an organisation working to sustain skills and create jobs in the UK's garment making industry. In 2025, Grant was appointed Chancellor of Queen Margaret University, Edinburgh, and was formally installed on 7 July 2025.

== Personal life ==
During the COVID-19 pandemic, Grant moved from London to Lancashire in March 2020 to run his factory in Blackburn, where he was making personal protective equipment (PPE) for the NHS. He divides his time between London and Yorkshire, where he now lives.

Grant's partner Rachael Hampton is a dentist whom he met in 2022. He was previously in a relationship with fellow designer Katie Hillier from 2007 to 2015.

Grant's father died after contracting COVID-19 in 2020. His mother still lives in Morningside.

== Bibliography ==
- Grant, Patrick, ed. (2014). Original Man: the Tautz Compendium of Less Ordinary Gentlemen. Berlin: Gestalten. ISBN 978-3-89955-552-3.
- Grant, Patrick (2024). Less: Stop Buying So Much Rubbish: How Having Fewer, Better Things Can Make Us Happier. HarperCollins. p. 368. ISBN 978-0-00-866400-8.
- Grant, Patrick (2024). The Savile Row Suit: The Art of Hand Tailoring on Savile Row. Berlin: Gestalten. p. 176. ISBN 978-3-96704-125-5.
