= L. Ostermayr =

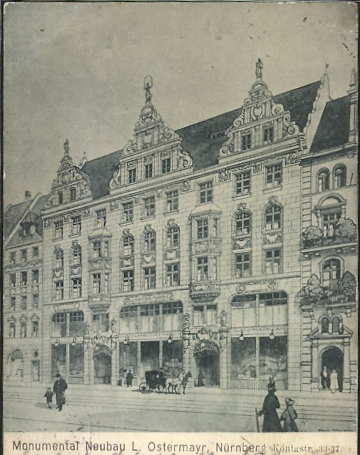
The store of L. Ostermayr at Königsstraße 31-37 (now just 33), in Nuremberg, around 1900

L. Ostermayr was a glass and porcelain manufacturer and art products shop in Nuremberg, Bavaria.

It was founded in 1820 by Johann Nepomuk Ostermayr (1800–1855). His son Johann Leonhard Ostermayr (1842–1906) expanded the business substantially. His sons Hans und Julius Ostermayr entered the business around 1900. A new landmark shop was constructed at that time at the Königstraße 31–37. The company received an Imperial and Royal Warrant of Appointment to the court of Austria-Hungary as well as Royal ones to the courts of Bavaria and Romania.

The main store was destroyed during World War II in the aerial bombings of the city.
