= Hammond & Co. =

British menswear company

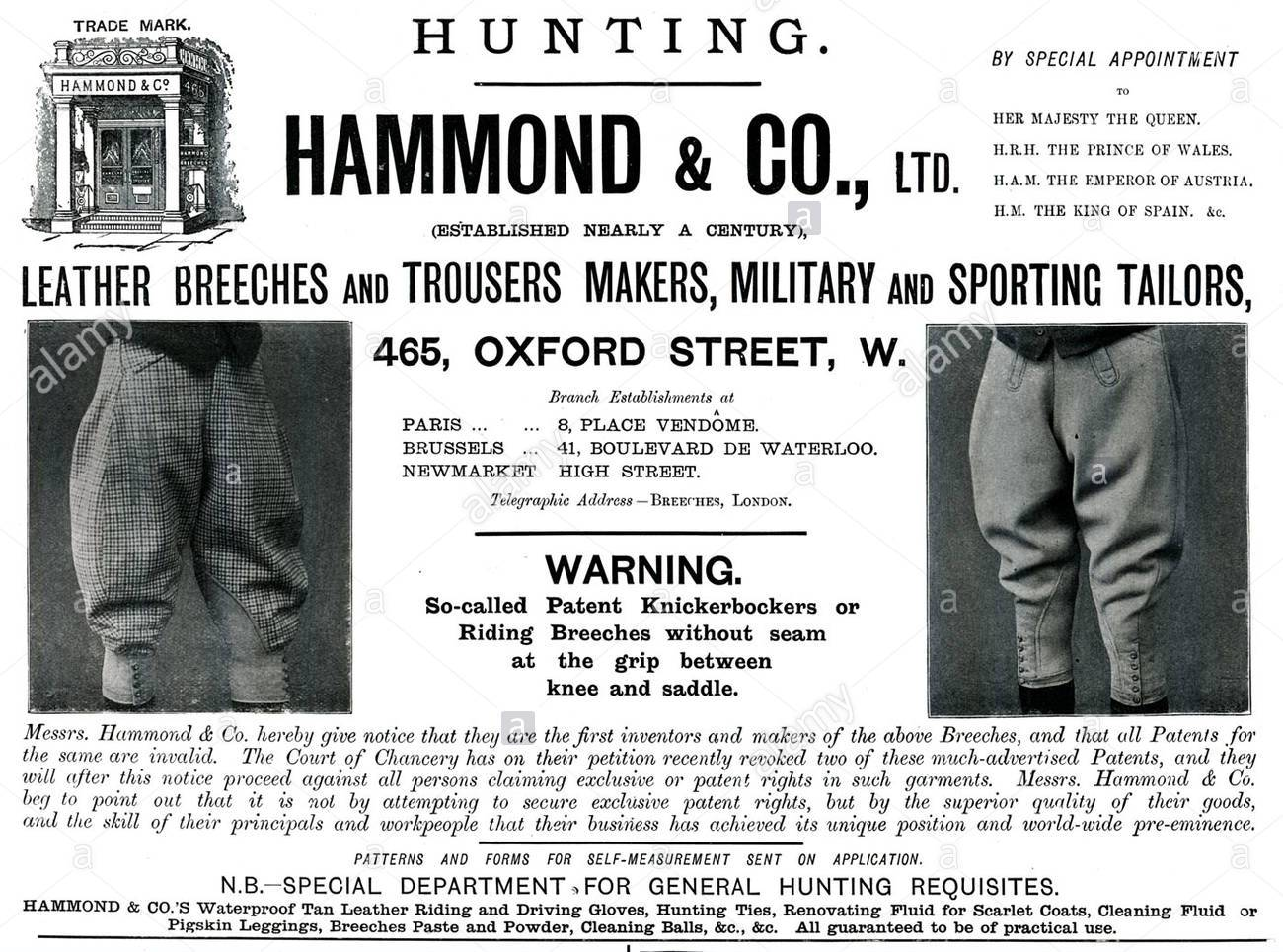
Hammond & Co. advertisement (1897)

Hammond & Co. is a British menswear line founded in 1776 as a bespoke men's tailor and located in London. It was relaunched by Patrick Grant in 2013 as an exclusive diffusion line for Debenhams.

== History ==
Robert Hammond founded his tailoring business around 1776 and became a renowned London sporting tailor. The company continued to grow and became successful. It became tailors to aristocrats and monarchs, such as King Edward VII, King George V, Queen Victoria, the King of the Belgians, an Imperial and Royal Warrant of Appointment from the Emperor of Austria, the King of Spain and the King of Portugal. Other customers included Parisian couturier Paul Poiret and General John J. Pershing. It became a subsidiary of Norton & Sons.

The Victoria & Albert Museum has a driving coat from 1906 in its permanent collection.

In April 2013, it was announced that British fashion designer Patrick Grant would be relaunching Hammond & Co. as a diffusion line available exclusively at British clothing retailer Debenhams.
