= Emilie Bach =

Australian Artist and journalist

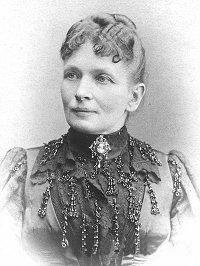
Emilie Bach

Emilie Bach (July 2, 1840 – April 29, 1890) (née Kohn) was an artist and journalist. In 1873, she co-founded the Imperial and Royal Vocational School of Art Embroidery with fellow needleworker Therese Mirani in Vienna, Austria, where she also filled the role of director. She also established schools in Graz, Laibach, Prague, Brünn, and Agram. She published several works on the subject of embroidery, including Muster Stilvoller Handarbeiten für Schule und Haus in two volumes (1883), and Neue Muster im Alten Stil (1887), which was later published in English as New Patterns in Old Styles. She contributed to many daily papers, such as the Neue Freie Presse, Heimat, and Wiener Allgemeine Zeitung Wiener_Allgemeine_Zeitung and delivered many lectures on arts and handicrafts, most of which were published.

Bach also served on juries for the applied arts at international exhibitions abroad.

Bach and Mirani's dress and design reform efforts were covered in Viennese periodicals, including feminist journal Dokumente der Frauen and fashion magazine Wiener Mode. Design history scholar Rebecca Houze likens the attention to detail in Bach's publications to the works of German architect and author Gottfried Semper, in particular Der Stil in den technischen and tektonischen Künste... (1860–63).

Multiple designs by Bach, including those for an embroidered sachet and a parasol "with a border in Spanish embroidery" were featured in Harper's Bazaar in 1881.
