= Ed Meier =

German shoemaking company

Coordinates: 48°08′42″N 11°34′4.80″E

Eduard Meier GmbH
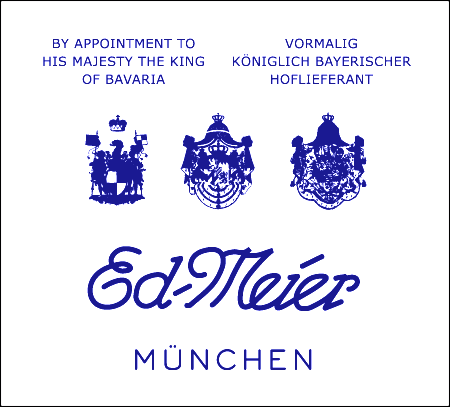

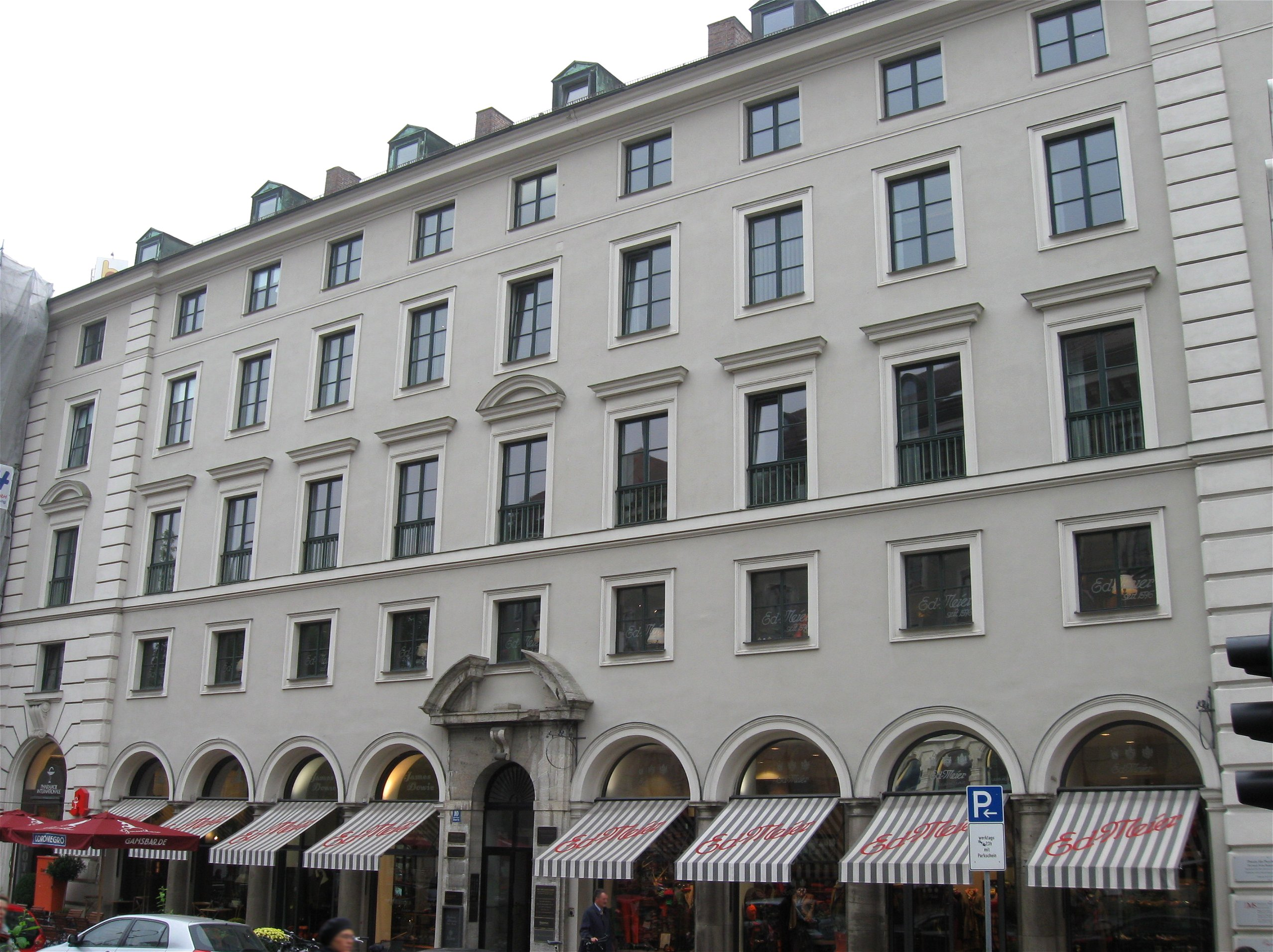
- Company type: GmbH
- Industry: Shoemaking
- Founded: 1596
- Founder: Hans Mayr
- Headquarters: Brienner Straße 10, Munich, Germany
- Products: Luxury shoes, clothes, leather goods and accessories
- Owners: Peter Eduard Meier; Brigitte Meier
- Website: www.edmeier.de

Eduard Meier GmbH, also known as Ed Meier, is a German shoemaking company founded in Munich in 1596. It is the oldest existing shoemaking company in the world, and one of the oldest continuously operating companies in the world. Today, the company's headquarters and main store are located at Palais Arco, Brienner Straße 10, in Munich.

== History ==
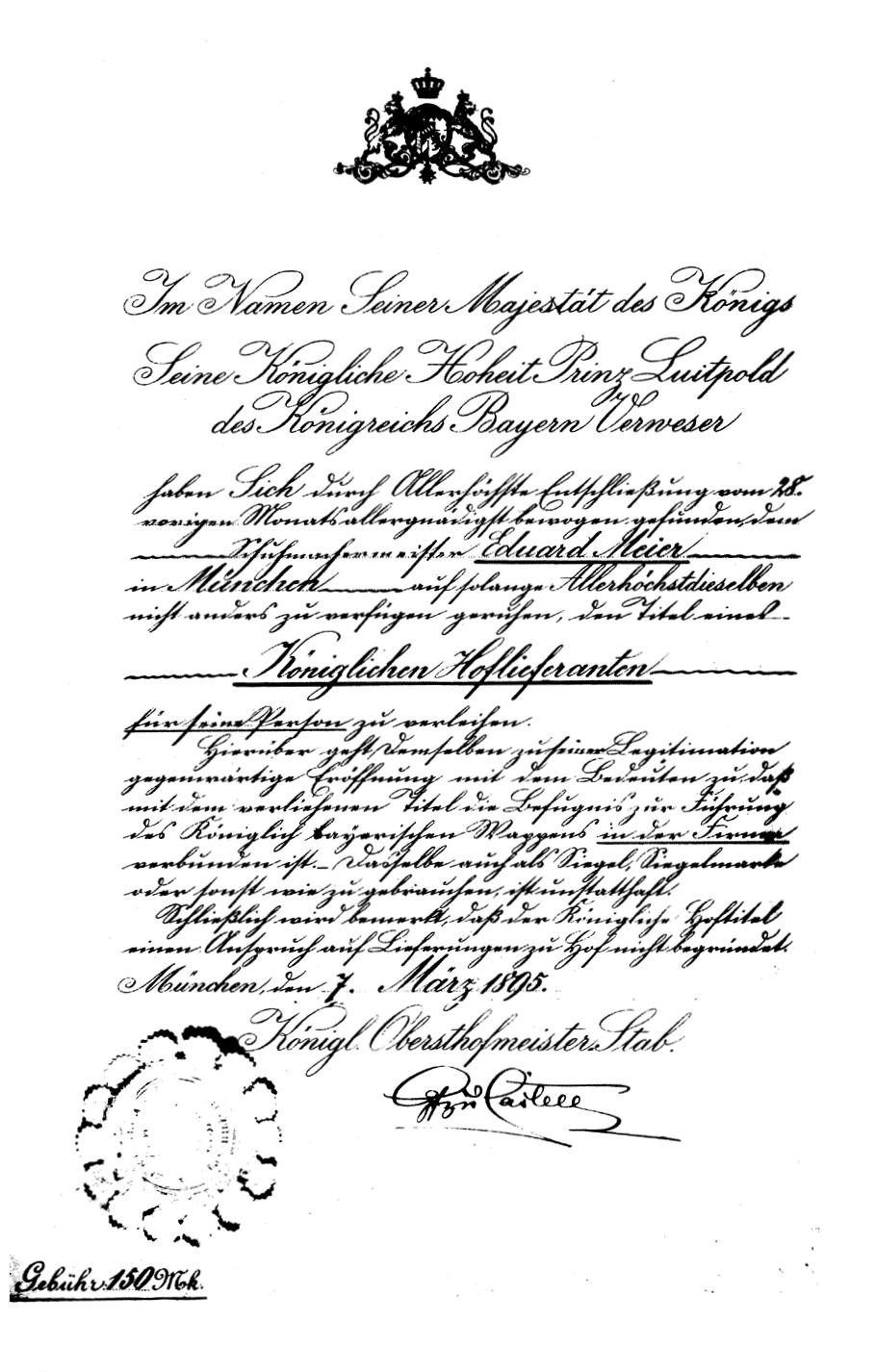
Royal Warrant of Appointment of Bavaria given to Eduard Meier by Count zu Castell on March 7, 1895

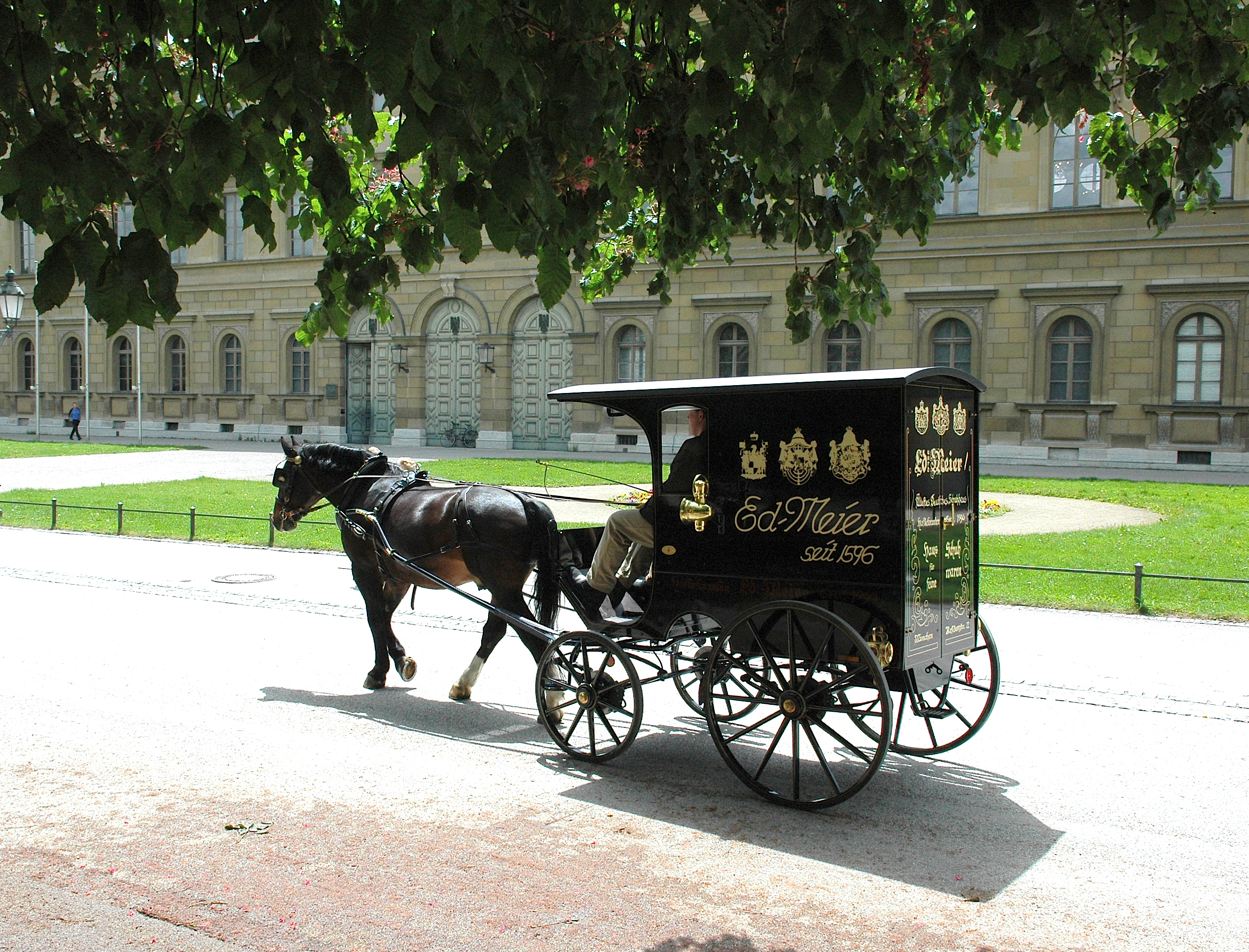
Ed.Meier delivery carriage in the Hofgartenstrasse in front of the Royal Residence in Munich

The business was founded by Hans Mayr. It was first mentioned in 1596. Mayr was selling shoes primarily to the upper class. The company was purveyor to the Saxon royal house, the House of Hohenzollern-Sigmaringen, and since 1895 also to the Bavarian royal house, holding a Royal Warrant.

Customers could get customized shoes "for every occasion and usage" by mail order. Mayr made wooden lasts of each customer's feet and stored them for at least 30 years so that customers could choose new shoes from an illustrated catalog.

At the beginning of the 20th century, Wilhelm Eduard Meier expanded the offering with ready-made high-quality shoes. After World War II, the company was rebuilt from ruins by Eduard Meier II, who had inherited it from his father. To maximize accuracy of fit, Meier used a pedoscope to see feet inside shoes. The result of his examinations were his patent-registered "Peduform" shoes.

Today, the company is led by 13th-generation siblings Peter Eduard Meier and Brigitte Meier. Besides high-quality, ready-to-wear footwear and bespoke shoes, they sell sports and outdoor gear, classic-style clothing and trachten, leather goods, and accessories. In the city of Munich, they can be delivered by horse-drawn carriage as in former times.
