= Sljeme (company) =

- Industry: luxury goods manufacturing, retail
- Founded: 1921
- Founder: Samuel Gati
- Key people: Samuel Gati (1887–1944)
- Products: trunks, fine leather goods, pet accessories
- Website: www.sljemeautokoffer.com

Sljeme is a trunk-making company in Croatia founded in 1921 and held a Royal warrant of appointment to the court of the Kingdom of Yugoslavia from 1931 to 1941.

== History ==
In 1921, Samuel Gati established Sljeme with the first shop at 12 Medulićeva Street in Zagreb. Gati was an Austro-Hungarian master malletier with over two decades of experience. In Zagreb, he began production of top-quality high-fashion trunks, car trunks, bags, gloves, and accessories under the name Sljeme. The company soon became famous for its excellent craftsmanship. They started exporting throughout Europe and took part in numerous exhibitions, such as the 1937 Paris Exhibition. Eventually, a store was opened at 26 Ilica Street, Zagreb's busiest street. Expansion continued, and a store opened in Belgrade at 2 Poenkarova Street, in the heart of the city. It soon grabbed the attention of the royal family, with Princess Olga of Greece and Denmark becoming a regular customer. In 1931 Sljeme became a Royal Warrant Holder of the Yugoslav court. At the beginning of World War II, a new store was opened in Zagreb's main square, 1, Ban Jelačić Square.

After World War II, communists came to power in Croatia and nationalized private companies, including Sljeme. Because the company manufactured "bourgeois" luxury goods and supplied them to the royal family, it was considered to be "politically incorrect." Its name was forcibly changed to "Partizansko Sljeme" to celebrate the Yugoslav Partisans. By the end of the 1960s, Sljeme was merged with another leather goods manufacturer in Zagreb and was discontinued as a brand. In 2012, Sljeme was revived; the company's history was recently put on display as an exhibit at the Zagreb City Museum.

Sljeme ad

== Samuel Gati ==
Samuel Gati, Sljeme's founder, was an Austro-Hungarian Jew born in 1887 in Szigetvár. After his apprenticeship to become a malletier in Budapest, he moved to Pécs in 1915 and founded a trunk-making company. He married Elisabeth Sečan of Nagykanizsa and their daughter, Magdalena Gati, was born in 1917. In 1920, after World War I and maybe because of the Hungarian White Terror, the family moved to Zagreb. The following year, Samuel Gati continued his trunk-making business with his newly founded company, Sljeme. When World War II started and after the Independent State of Croatia was formed, Jews were persecuted by anti-Semitic legislation (The Holocaust in Croatia). Samuel Gati was no exception: he was arrested and detained first at Crikvenica and then Kraljevica and was later moved to the Rab concentration camp, all under the rule of Fascist Italy. Later, after the surrender of Italy, Gati was transferred to Birkenau concentration camp under Nazi control, where he was murdered in the camp's gas chamber in 1944.
