= Therese Mirani =

Austrian embroidery artist and educator

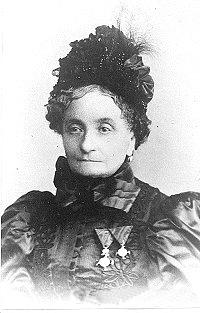
- Born: 2 December 1824; Prague, Bohemia, (now Czech Republic
- Died: 24 May 1901 (aged 76); Vienna, Austrian Empire, Austria-Hungary
- Occupations: Embroider, teacher, writer
- Known for: Director of the Imperial and Royal School for Art Embroidery
- Awards: Imperial and Royal Warrant of Appointment
- Honours: Zivil-Verdienstkreuz (Civil Service Cross)

Therese Mirani (2 December 1824 – 24 May 1901) was an embroiderer and teacher, who was director of the Imperial and Royal School for Art Embroidery of the Ministry of Commerce in Vienna. She invented a new type of lacework, points imperial, and a new technique of embroidery, broderie dentelle, which was collected by Empress Elisabeth of Austria. She was awarded an Imperial and Royal Warrant of Appointment.

== Biography ==
Mirani was born on 2 December 1824 in Prague, Bohemia. Her father was the writer Johann Heinrich Mirani (1802–73). Interested in both the technique, theory and history of embroidery from a young age, Mirani related in later life that she always wanted to be self-employed and described herself as a "voluntary spinster".

In 1863, she began to supply the royal court and, in 1865, she was awarded with an Imperial and Royal Warrant of Appointment. She invented a new embroidery technique called broderie dentelle and a new type of lace known as points imperial. Empress Elisabeth was a collector of Mirani's broderie dentelle works, and commissioned an altar-cloth using the technique for the church of St Stephen. She was also a fashion advisor to the New Free Press, and wrote on home decoration for Wiener Mode.

In 1867, a sample of Mirani's white embroidery work was exhibited at the Österreichisches Museum für Kunst und Industrie. In the same year, she was awarded a medal at the World Exhibition in Paris and was the first woman on the Austrian jury.

In 1874, she helped to found the Imperial and Royal School for Art Embroidery of the Ministry of Commerce in Vienna, and was one of its first teachers. After the death of the director Emilie Bach (1840–1890), she became director. The school was designed to enable women to produce high-quality Hausindustrie goods, and to provide opportunities for working class women.

Upon her retirement in 1899, she was awarded the Civil Service Cross (de). She died on 24 May 1901 in Vienna.

== Historiography ==
Historian Rebecca Houze has described how Mirani "helped shape the direction of design reform in Vienna". Design historian Jeremy Aynsley described both Mirani and Emilie Bach as "overlooked figures" in the history of Arts and Crafts schools and the development of the subject in Austria.
