= Rumpelmayer =

Rumpelmayer is a surname. Notable people with the surname include:

- Anton Rumpelmayer (1832–1914), also known as Antoine, Austrian-born confectioner
- Viktor Rumpelmayer (1830–1885), Austro-Hungarian architect
