= E. Fessler =

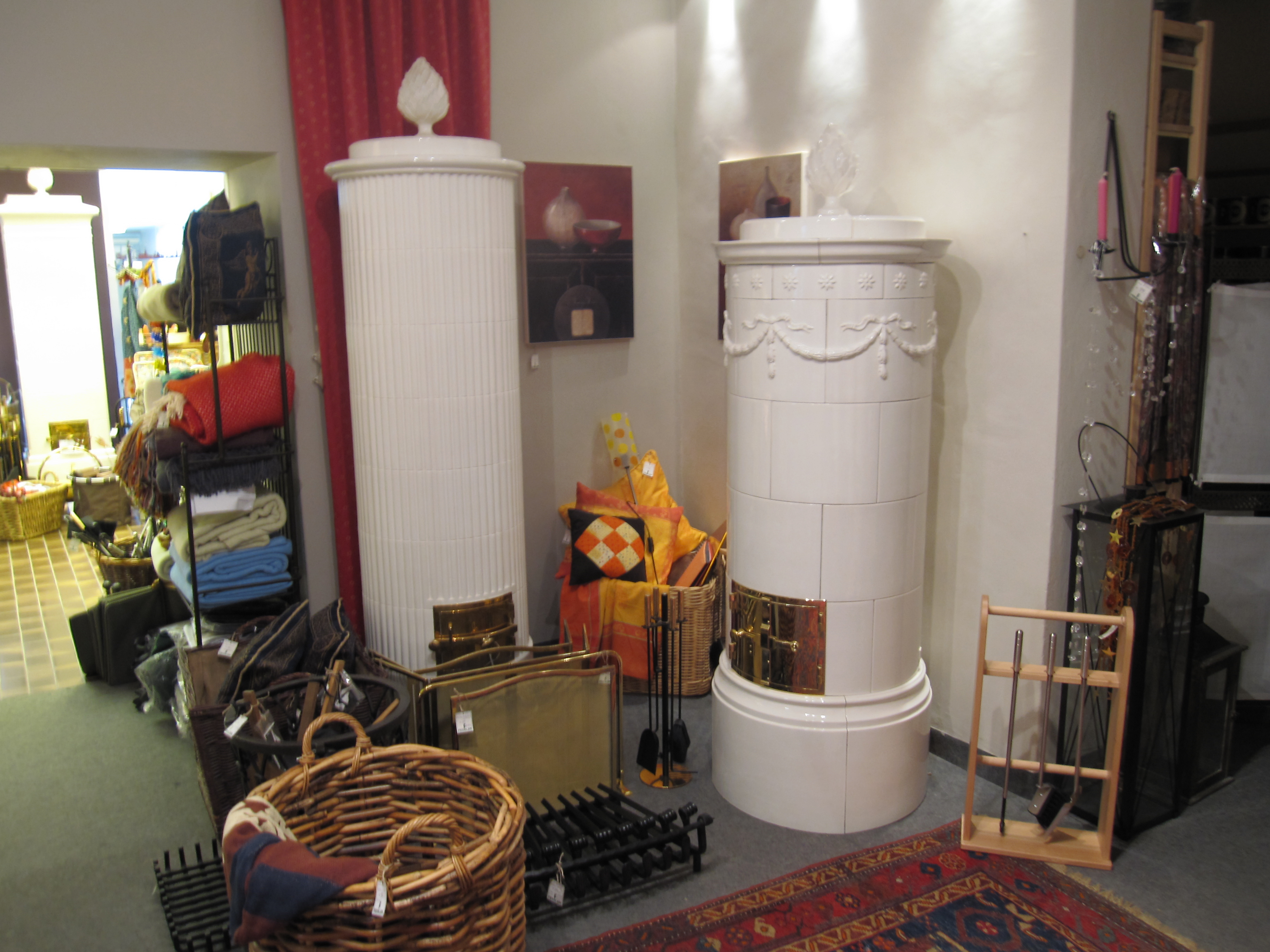
Ceramic ovens by E. Fessler

E. Fessler is a stove-fitter company that produces stoves, fireplaces and other ceramics in Vienna. The company headquarters is located at the Mozartgasse 3 in the 4th District Wieden.

The company was founded in 1794 Lorenz Fessler from Vorarlberg at Alt Lerchenfeld 40. Over the centuries, it became very successful and received an imperial warrant from the emperor as a purveyor to the imperial and royal court of Austria-Hungary.
