= Bucharest World Trade Center =

- Interactive map of the Bucharest World Trade Center area

General information
- Status: Completed
- Location: Piața Montreal 10, Bucharest 011469, Romania
- Coordinates: 44°28′32.19″N 26°4′9.32″E
- Construction started: 1992
- Opened: 1994

Height
- Height: 52 m (171 ft)

Technical details
- Floor count: 13
- Floor area: 40,000 m^{2} (430,000 sq ft)

Other information
- Parking: 400 parking spaces

Website
- www.wtcb.ro

The Bucharest World Trade Center is a business centre in Bucharest, Romania. Among other things, it houses the headquarters of Michelin Romania, ABN AMRO Bank as well as Pullman Hotel Bucharest. The center has been a part of the World Trade Centers Association since 1994.

The Bucharest World Trade Centre is 52 m (171 ft) tall. It has approximately 40,000 m^{2} (430,000 sq ft) of interior space. Whereas 18.000 m^{2} (193.75 sq ft) of that is for the Hotel Pullmann Bucharest World Trade Centre.
