= Konpeitō =

Japanese sugar candy

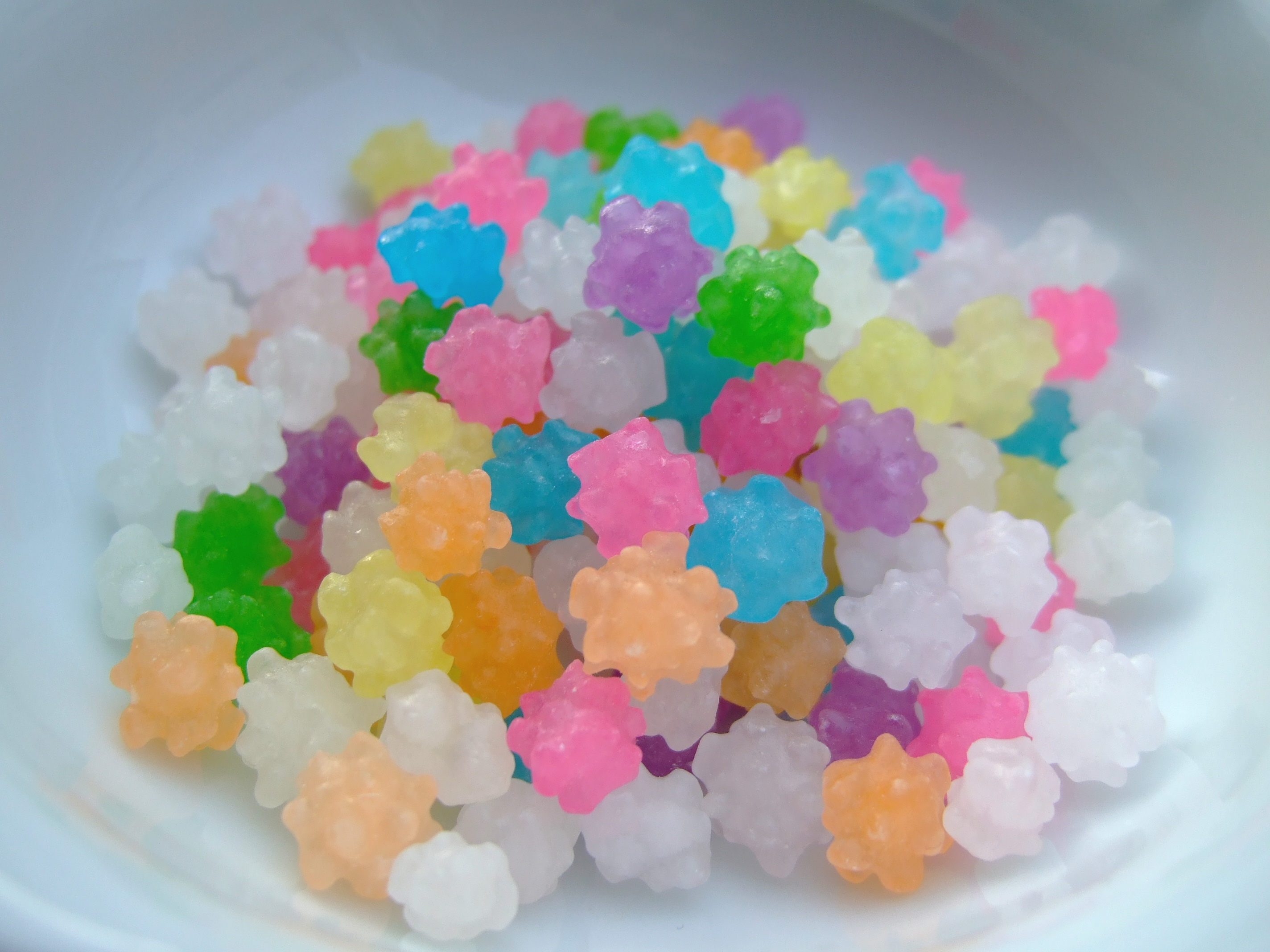
- Konpeitō in various colors
- Type: Confectionery
- Place of origin: Japan
- Main ingredients: Sugar, water

Konpeitō (金平糖, こんぺいとう), also spelled kompeitō, is a type of Japanese sugar candy. It takes the form of a small sphere with a bumpy surface, and comes in a variety of colors and flavors. Introduced from Portugal as a sugar-coated confection with a poppy seed or sesame seed center, konpeitō was eventually transformed into an all-sugar confection with a zarame (ザラメ, coarse sugar) center.

== Etymology ==
The word konpeitō comes from the Portuguese word confeito ("comfit"), which is a type of sugar candy, and also an umbrella term for sweets in general.

The characters 金平糖 (lit. 'golden flat sugar') are ateji selected mostly for their phonetic value and can also be written 金米糖 or 金餅糖.

== History ==
The technique for producing sugar candy was introduced to Japan in the early 16th century by Portuguese traders. The infrastructure and refining technology of sugar had not yet been established in Japan. As konpeitō uses much sugar, it was rare and expensive. In 1569, Luís Fróis, a Portuguese missionary, presented a glass flask of konpeitō to Oda Nobunaga in order to obtain the permit for mission work of Christianity.

By the Meiji period, konpeitō had already been culturally prescribed as one of the standards of Japanese sweets—the character Sugar Plum Fairy in The Nutcracker was translated into Konpeitō no Sei (金平糖の精, "Fairy of Konpeitō").

== Production ==
Konpeitō is usually 5 to 10 mm (0.20 to 0.39 in) in diameter and is produced by repeatedly coating a sugar syrup over a core consisting of a grain of coarse sugar. Originally, the core was a poppy seed. The process is somewhat similar to the dragée process, except the candies are produced by being ladled with sugar syrup and rotated slowly in a large heated gong-shaped tub (銅鑼, dora). Each grain of the core sugar grows over the course of several days with the continued rotating, heating, and application of syrup, becoming a ball covered with tiny bulges. It usually takes 7–13 days to make konpeitō and they are still crafted by artisans today.

== Other uses ==
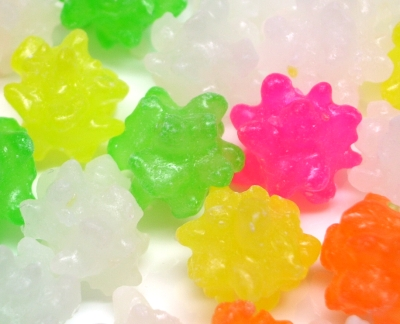
Konpeitō

The Japanese Ministry of Defense's Emergency Food Ration tins and the Japan Ground Self-Defense Force's Combat Ration tins both contain konpeito candies, in addition to hardtack bread/biscuits and other food items. While the candies aid in the calorie content necessary for activities, it also helps promote the creation of saliva to make it easier to eat the dry bread. According to the Ministry of Defense specifications, "Each white emergency ration bag will contain 150g of small dry bread, with 8 whites, 3 reds, 2 yellows, 2 greens as standard, amounting to 15g or more to be put in the bag." It is thought that providing the 'colorful and enjoyable' Konpeito will also reduce the stress that would be experienced at times during a disaster.

Konpeito is often used for celebrations such as marriage and childbirth, gifted in elaborate candy boxes called bonboniēru (ボンボニエール), from the French bonbonnière, meaning candy box. It is also given as a gift for prayers at shrines and temples. The practice of giving bonbonniere dates back to the commemoration ceremony of the Meiji Constitution in 1889 and has since been thought to be a symbol of good luck. The Japanese Imperial Family still gives Onshi no Konpeitō as the official "Welcome" gift continuously for over 130 years.

== See also ==
- Japanese words from Portuguese
- Rock candy
- Wagashi
