= J. Pauly & Sohn =

Bedding company

- Type: Privately held company
- Industry: Furniture / luxury goods
- Genre: Family business
- Founded: Vienna, Austria 1838
- Founder: Josef Pauly
- Headquarters: Vienna, Austria
- Area served: Global locations
- Products: High-end mattress / beds, bedding accessories

J. Pauly & Sohn was one of the oldest manufacturers of bedding products in the world and, together with Oswald Matthäus, was among the two principal suppliers of beds to the Austrian Empire over several generations.

Josef Pauly established the company in Vienna, in 1838 when he received a license to make beds and mattresses from the emperor, Ferdinand I of Austria (1793–1875). The name of the new company was "J. Pauly & Sohn". In 1878, Pauly received an Imperial and Royal Warrant of Appointment as a Purveyor to the Imperial and Royal Court of Emperor Franz Joseph I and his wife Empress Elisabeth of Austria, (known as "Sissi").

== History ==
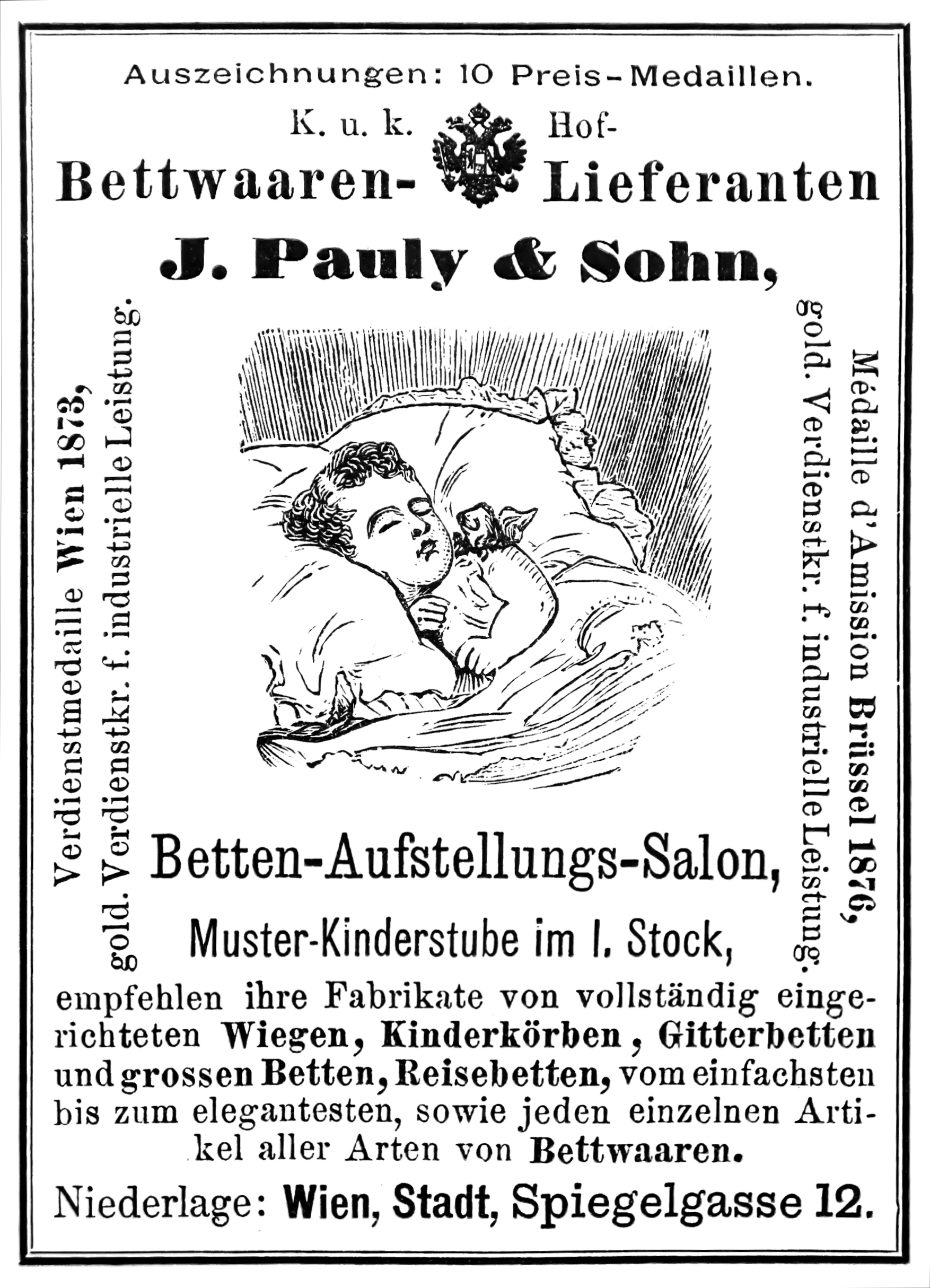
J. Pauly & Sohn advertisement, 1891

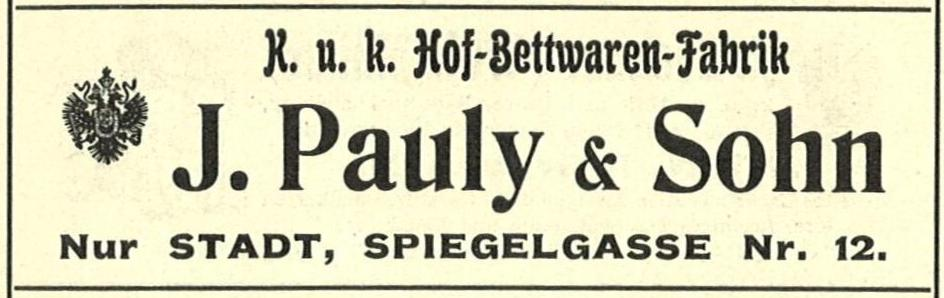
J. Pauly & Sohn advertisement, 1906

In Austria, the handcrafting of beds and mattresses is a traditional industry. In the 18th century in Austria, there were ten recognized masters of this profession. The master craftsmen of beds and mattresses also handcrafted suitcases and saddles. This was because many of the expensive materials such as horsetail hair, wool, cotton and leather used in production were the same. The master craftsmen, especially those of Vienna, were well known and exported their goods to Greece, Turkey and other countries in the Middle East. During the 19th century, there was an increase in demand for luxury products of this sort.

== Recognition ==
The 1873 Vienna World's Fair provided a showcase for the local artisans. During the Fair, Josef Pauly received the first "Golden Cross for Industrial Merit". The year 1873 was the fiftieth anniversary of the founding of Pauly and Sohn. Josef Pauly appeared in a Vienna publication honouring distinguished industrialists. By 1891, the company had received ten awards, including the Medal d'amission ("medal of rightful admission") in Brussels in 1876.

According to a 1903 Vienna newspaper, J. Pauly & Sohn was considered "one of the oldest and most respected companies in the bedding industry" as, at the time of publication, "it had been 31 years since Pauly had obtained the honorary title of K. & K. Purveyor of the Empire and was successfully delivering beds and furniture internationally".

An Imperial and Royal Purveyor (k.u.k. Hoflieferant) was, in Austria-Hungary, a trader of products or services who had a special permit, by imperial privilege, to deliver its goods or services to the court in Vienna. This privilege allowed the suppliers to advertise publicly and exempted them from paying tax. The company received the title only if it was a leader in its industry in quality. The title was therefore a seal of approval of “highest” class, the highest honor that a business could get back then.

J. Pauly & Sohn was the first company in Austria to produce handcrafted down feather duvets. They made beds and relaxation furniture, bedroom furniture, mirrors, living room furniture, and furniture for green houses and patios. They offered complete furnishings, beds for children, baby cribs, travel beds and a large variety of bed linen, headboards and products for sleep. In their mattresses and furniture they used materials such as horsehair (a moisture resistant material used at the time in saddles and carriages seats), cotton, wool, springs and silk.

Josef Pauly was succeeded by his son, also named "Josef Pauly". By 1900, the Pauly family had been handcrafting beds for four generations. Nevertheless, the First World War, the fall of the monarchy in 1918, the Great Depression and eventually the Second World War created constant challenges for the company. The last family owner was Dorothea Henning.
