= Imperial and Royal Warrant of Appointment =

Honour during the Austro-Hungarian Empire

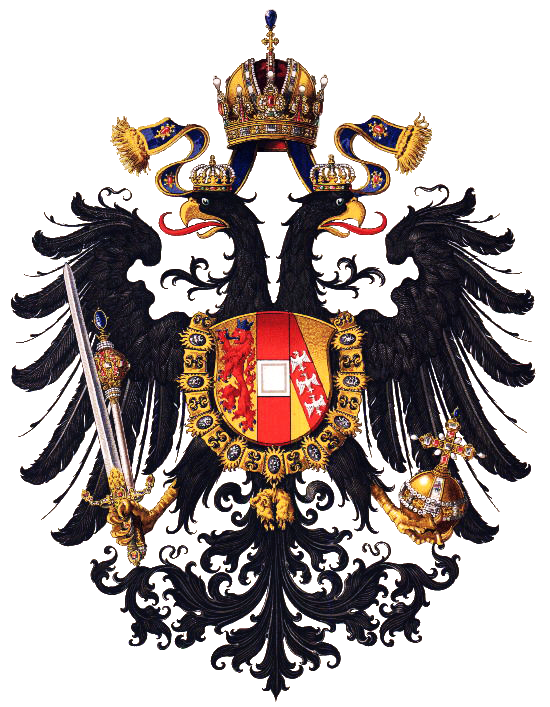
A Purveyor to the Imperial and Royal Court (k.u.k. Hoflieferant) was allowed to publicly display the imperial eagle

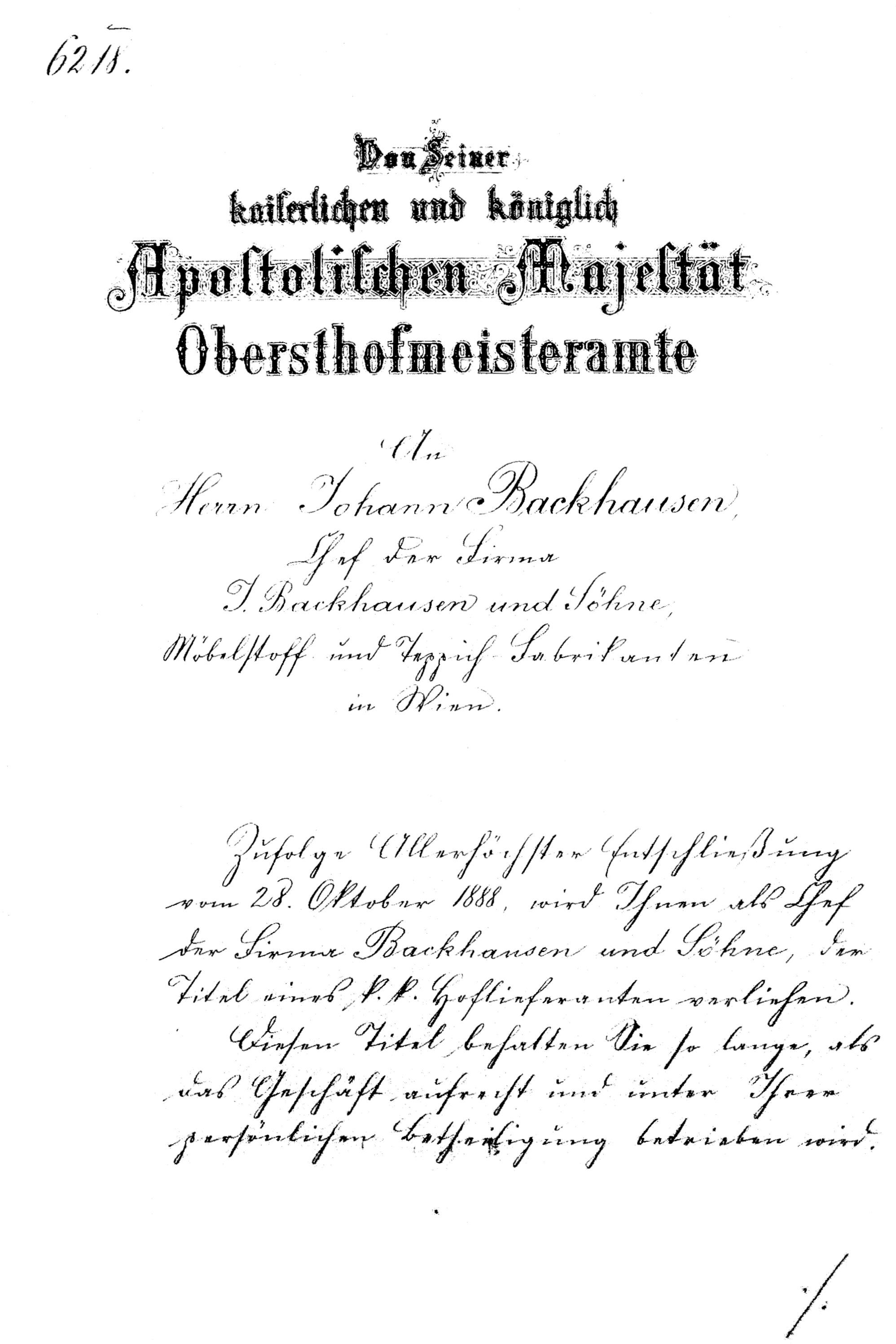
Imperial and royal warrant of appointment issued to Johann Backhausen on November 8, 1888

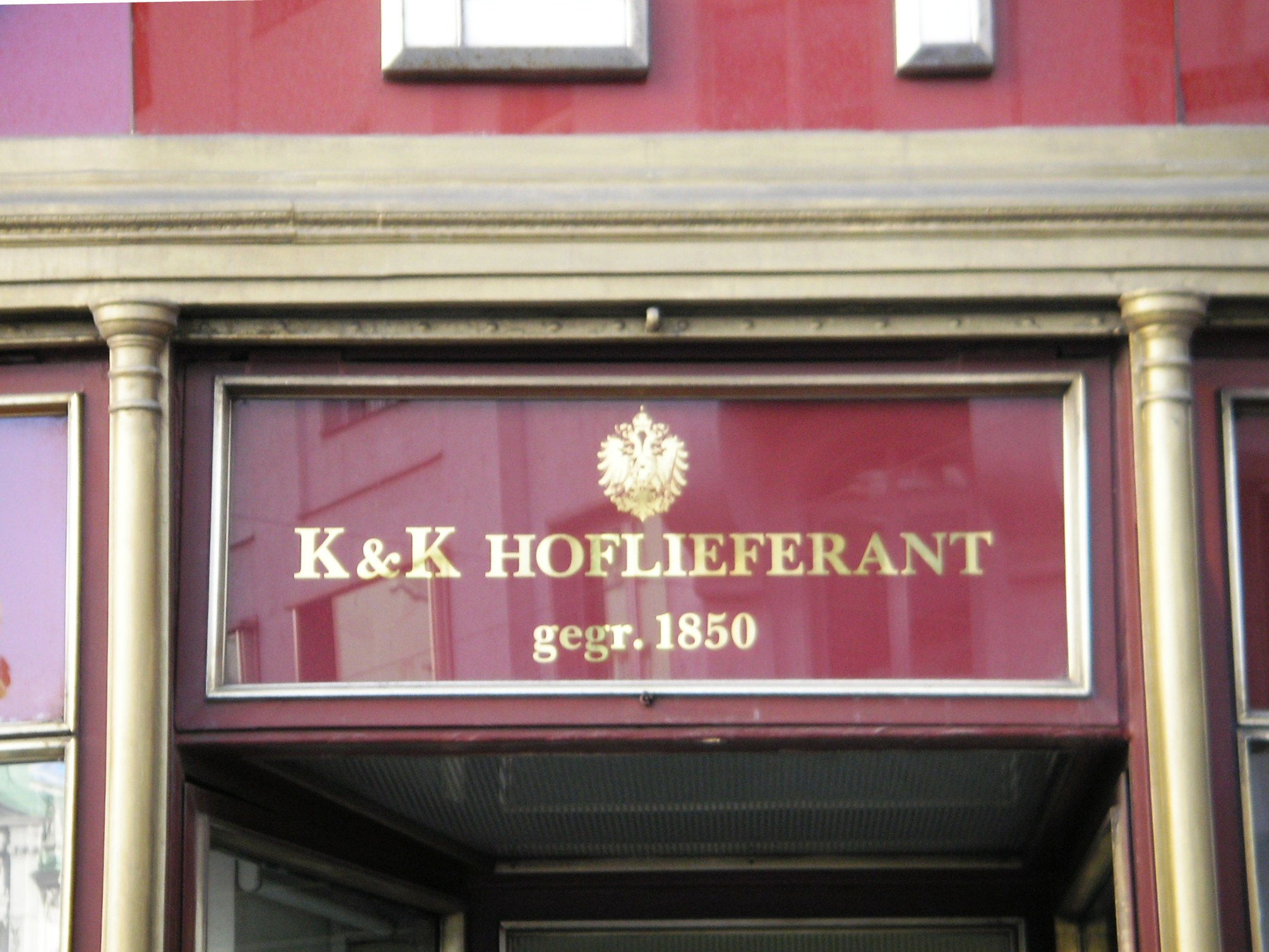
Imperial eagle displayed at the store of the purveyor Rudolf Waniek, in Vienna

An Imperial and Royal Warrant of Appointment (German: kaiserlicher und königlicher Hoflieferant) during the Austro-Hungarian Empire was issued to vendors who supplied goods or services to the Austrian imperial court in Vienna and/or the Hungarian royal court in Budapest. The warrant was normally an official document, which enabled the supplier to advertise the fact and thus lend itself prestige.

Suppliers continued to charge for their goods and services. The application process took years and was given only to those deemed of the highest quality to be worth to receive the honour upon personal approval of the monarch. The warrant was typically advertised on company letter-heads and products by displaying the coat of arms or the heraldic badge of the imperial eagle. Underneath the coat of arms would usually appear the phrase "k.u.k. Hoflieferant", which translates into English as "Purveyor to the Imperial and Royal Court". Depending on where the supplier was located within the dual monarchy, it could be adapted into the local language such as "Ces. i Król. dostawca Dworu" in Polish, "C. a k. dvorní dodavatel" in Czech, or "Fornitore di corte imperiale e reale" in Italian.

The warrant was initially given to the owners of a company or a tradesperson, not the company itself. Only later were entire companies given the warrant.

The warrant was given as a supplier for the overall court. However personal suppliers to the emperor or the empress were given a higher warrant as "k.u.k. Kammerlieferant", which translates as "Purveyor to the Imperial and Royal Chamber". It was possible for a supplier to receive both warrant forms for exceptional quality of services and goods.

== Warrant holders ==
Some warrant holders were from abroad.

Companies in the United Kingdom, Ireland and the United States received the honour including Nathaniel Wheeler for his sewing machines, Charles Lewis Tiffany, William Steinway and Steinway & Sons, Royal Worcester, Pim Brothers & Co. in Dublin, Peek Freans, Liverpool Vienna Bakery Kirkland Brothers, Liebig's Extract of Meat Company, Thomas Hine & Co., Hancocks & Co in London, Hammond & Co., and Elkington & Co.

Companies from France were, for example, Christofle & Co., Courvoisier, Kunkelmann & Comp., L.A. Levesque, Moët & Chandon, G.H. Mumm & Comp., Perrier-Jouët & Comp., Pol Roger & Comp., Rémy Martin, Louis Roederer, Rogée-Fromy, Café Angelina previously Rumpelmayer, Walbaum, Goulden & Co., Veuve Clicquot Ponsardin and Grégory Bajot.

To this date, certain brands preserve and use this title. In Vienna, there is a dozen of them, such as A.E. Köchert, Demel, Fischer / Herend, J. & L. Lobmeyr, J. Pauly & Sohn, Resch Gustav / Albin Denk, Stiebitz Franz Joseph / Zum Schwarzen Kameel, Stollwerck and Knize & Comp.

== See also ==
- Brand management
- List of royal warrant holders of the British royal family
- List of Royal Warrant Holders of the Swedish court
- Royal warrant of appointment
- Therese Mirani

== Bibliography ==
- Joachim Kronsbein. „Haben gewählt?“: Wiens Hoflieferanten pflegen die Nostalgie. In: Spiegel Geschichte, 6/2009. Die Habsburger: Aufstieg und Fall der mächtigsten Familie Europas.
- Catharina Christ: Jüdische k. und k. Hoflieferanten in der Textilbranche mit Niederlassung in Wien in der Zeit von 1870 bis 1938. Dipl.-Arb., Vienna: University, 2000
- Ingrid Haslinger: Kunde – Kaiser. Die Geschichte der ehemaligen k. u. k. Hoflieferanten. Schroll, Vienna 1996, ISBN 3-85202-129-4.
- János Kalmár, Mella Waldstein: K.u.k. Hoflieferanten Wiens. Stocker, Graz 2001, ISBN 3-7020-0935-3.
