= Marc-Etienne Janety =

Royal goldsmith

Marc-Etienne Janety (1739-1820) was the Royal Goldsmith to King Louis XVI until 1792, when the King was dethroned. A few of Janety's pieces worked in platinum (a novel metal in the late 1700s) survive. One is a platinum and glass sugar bowl (1786) at the Metropolitan Museum of Art in New York. The others are four kilograms Janety made in 1796–1799. One of them was declared the Kilogramme des Archives (Kilogram of the French Archives) and became the legal kilogram standard for France in 1799, until superseded in 1889 by a platinum-iridium kilogram made by the Johnson-Matthey company.
