= Hotel Pullman Bucharest World Trade Center =

Hotel building in Bucharest, Romania

Coordinates: 44.475894°N 26.070219°E

- Interactive map of the Hotel Pullman Bucharest World Trade Center area

General information
- Status: Completed
- Location: Bucharest, Romania
- Construction started: 1992
- Opening: 1994
- Owner: Pullman Hotels and Resorts

Height
- Roof: 52 m (171 ft)

Technical details
- Floor count: 13
- Floor area: 18,000 m^{2} (190,000 sq ft)

Hotel Pullman Bucharest World Trade Center is a hotel building located in Bucharest, Romania. It has 12 floors and a surface of 18,000 m^{2}. The building is connected to the Bucharest World Trade Center. The hotel building formerly operated under the Sofitel brand.
