= Bakalowits =

Produces crystal chandeliers

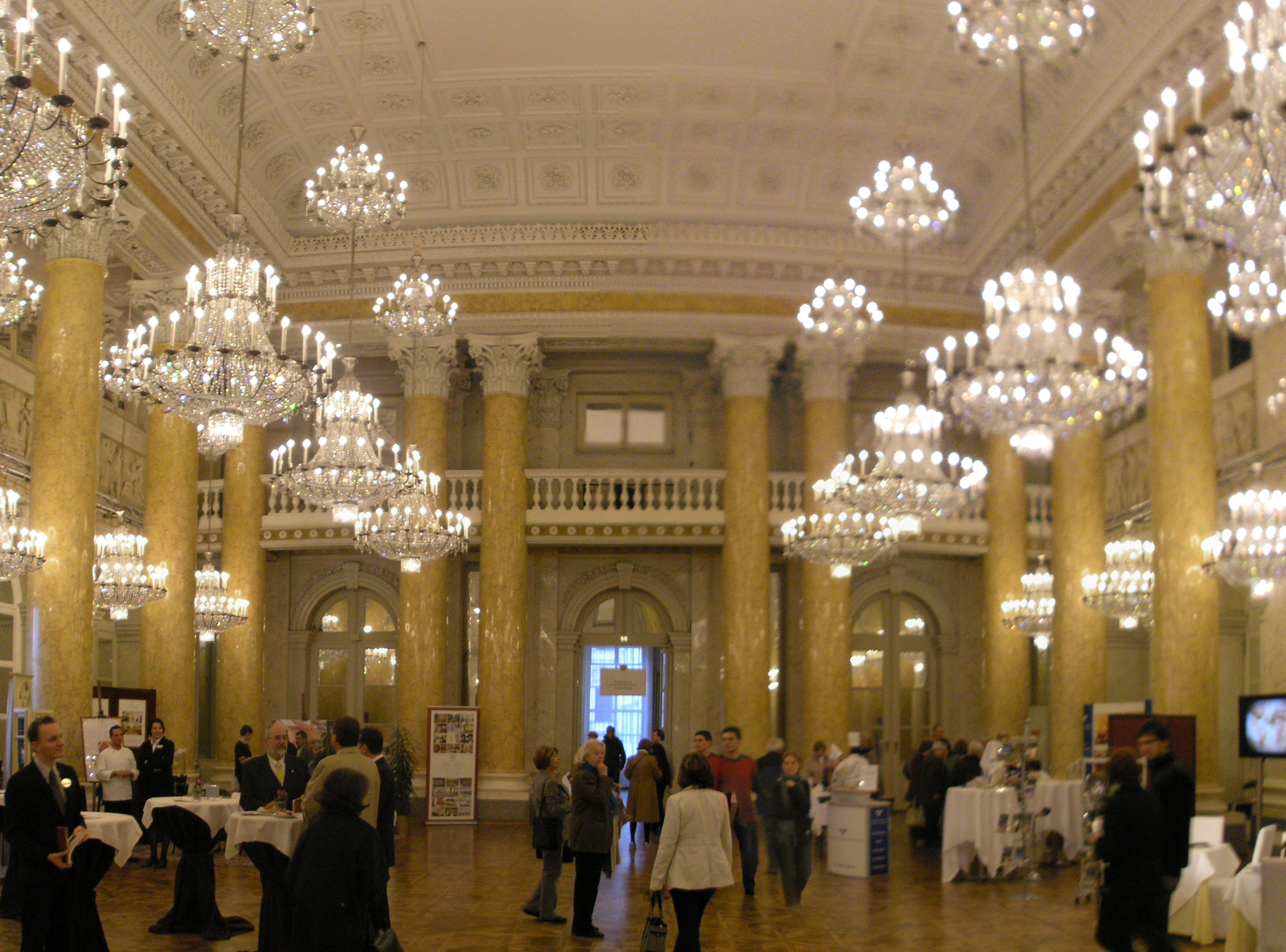
Chandeliers by Bakalowits in Hofburg Palace

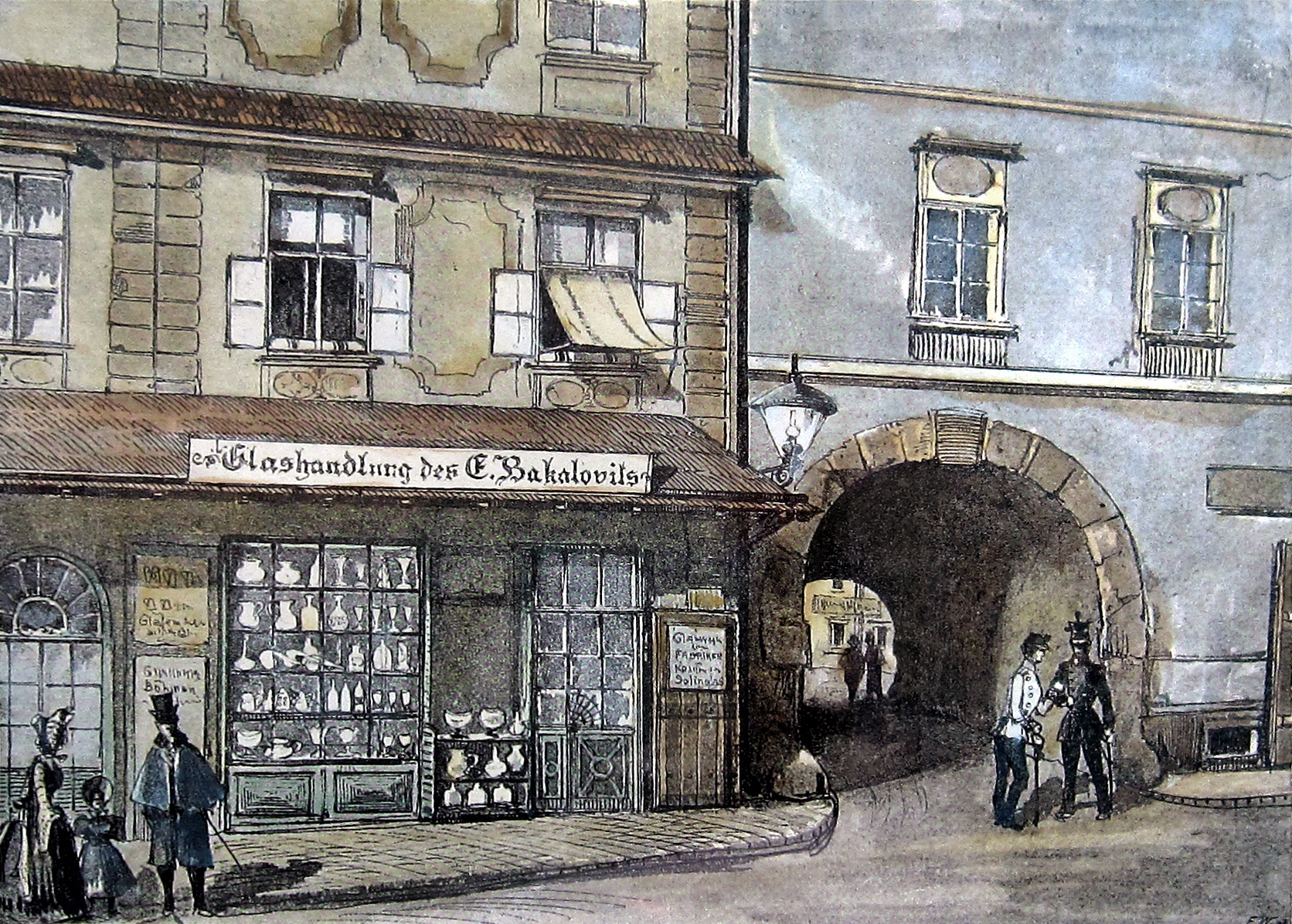
Bakalowits on Hoher Markt in Vienna's I. district (1845)

Bakalowits is a producer of crystal chandeliers based in Vienna.

== History ==
It was founded in 1845 by Elias Bakalowits. The company became very successful in providing crystal as well as lighting for palaces and other notable buildings. The original store was located on the Hoher Markt. His grandson Ludwig Bakalowits received an imperial warrant and became a purveyor to the imperial court in Vienna. Bakalowits has been in business for over 165 years.

== Products ==
Bakalowits is known for producing over 8,000 different styles of lighting fixtures that include contemporary and historical designs for commercial and residential locations. The settings that the lighting fixtures have been placed include:

- hotels
- palaces
- conference centers
- opera houses
- cruise ships
- private homes

== Business information ==
Bakalowits has been able to be featured in various regions such as Europe, Asia, and the Middle East. This business has also been able to take older chandeliers and restore them. Bakalowits now has the ability to export its products worldwide.
