= Onshi no Konpeitō =

Japanese imperial sweets

Onshi no Konpeitō (恩賜の金平糖) or Onshikonpeitō (恩賜金平糖) are small boxes of konpeitō candy given as gifts by the Japanese emperor or on behalf of the emperor.

Onshi no Konpeitō was given out by the 1890s, for example on the occasions of marriages, enthronements, or other auspicious events.

Konpeitō is given in elaborate small boxes called bonbonniere (ボンボニエール bonboniēru), from the French bonbonnière, meaning "candy box". The practice of giving bonbonnieres dates back to the commemoration ceremony of the Meiji Constitution in 1889 and has since been thought to be a symbol of good luck. The Japanese Imperial Family has used this gift as the official "Welcome" gift continuously for over 130 years.

Another form of imperial gifts that emerged at the same time were the Onshi no Tabako products, however this ceased in 2006.
