= Carol Parc Hotel =

Coordinates: 44°25′7.7″N 26°5′34.6″E

The Carol Parc Hotel in Bucharest, Romania, is a five star hotel near historical Carol Park. Opened in 2007, it contains one of the largest Murano crystal chandeliers in the world, stretching over four stories tall. Several celebrities have stayed there, including foreign dignitaries, singer Beyoncé Knowles, Deep Purple, Angela Gheorghiu, and Enrique Iglesias.

The hotel is located in the heart of Bucharest, on Aleea Suter Str. near the historical Carol Park. It is located on one of the city's highest geographic locations, Filaret Hill (named after a late 18th-century metropolitan bishop of the region). The cul-de-sac is named after Suter, a German architect who helped in the planning of the park and parts of the neighborhood, including the symmetrically built Suter street. Aleea is Romanian for "alley."

== Press coverage and awards ==
Newsweek included the hotel in its "Best of Romania" article, later following up with an exclusive in which the "extravagant services" are detailed.

Peter Imre, a Romanian restaurant critic, compared the hotel and its POEM Restaurant to the luxurious venues of the Interbellum Era, saying that "Sitting here, you expect King Carol and Queen Elisabeta to enter at any time.".

The building also received an award for "Best Renovation/Restoration Project in 2007" from the Romanian Architects Association.

== History ==
The hotel comprises two buildings of which the more than one-hundred-year-old main building is built in "Brâncovenesc style". Initially built in 1906 for a prominent architect, socialite and friend of King Carol I, the property was later sold to a Greek banker who owned the property until it was nationalized.

During the Communist period the building was nationalized and served as the headquarters for a number of communist party institutions, including ICRAL, the former housing authority (ICRAL in Romanian stands for "întreprindere de Constructii, Reparatii si Administrare Locativa").

The renovation and conversion cost close to 6 million Euros according to Romanian newspapers. This investment represents nearly twice the per room amount invested by other five star hotels in Bucharest.
