= Norton & Sons =

Savile Row bespoke tailor

Coordinates: 51°30′40.3″N 0°8′26″W

- Industry: Bespoke tailoring
- Founded: 1821; 205 years ago (London, United Kingdom)
- Founder: Walter Norton
- Headquarters: Savile Row; London, W1; United Kingdom
- Subsidiaries: Hoare & Tautz
- Website: nortonandsons.co.uk

Norton & Sons is a Savile Row bespoke tailor founded in 1821 by Walter Grant Norton. The firm is located on the east side of the street, at No. 16. It was purchased in 2005 by Scottish designer Patrick Grant, who revitalised the tailoring house. However, the company went into liquidation in 2022 and was apparently sold to James Sleater and Ian Meiers the following year.

== History ==
Walter Charles Norton founded the tailoring house on the Strand in 1821, attracting city businessman and German royalty.

In 1859, his son George James Norton was granted the freedom of the City of London. At about this time, the company became the tailor and Royal Warrant holder to William I, German Emperor. The firm specialised as a sporting tailor.

During the 1970s, the firm absorbed Hoare & Tautz, formed by the merger of E. Tautz & Sons, a sporting tailor, and J. Hoare & Co, a tailor.

In the early 21st century, the company was making fewer than 200 suits per year. It was acquired from the Granger family in 2005 by Patrick Grant, who graduated the same year from Saïd Business School, and his investors. Grant asked Moving Brands to design a "new identity", and has "forged links with young British Fashion Designers". Grant also relaunched E. Tautz & Sons as a ready-to-wear label in 2009, for which he was awarded the Menswear Designer of the Year Award at the British Fashion Awards in 2010.

Following the COVID-19 pandemic, Grant sold the majority stake of Norton & Sons to James Sleater, owner of Savile Row tailor the Cad & the Dandy, and Ian Meiers. Grant remains a minority stake holder in the company.

Norton & Sons is a comparatively small outfit, making about 300 bespoke suits a year (the largest probably makes about 1,000 per year) and employing seven tailors and just two cutters in 2011.
