= Margaret Ekpo =

Nigerian women's rights activist and social mobilizer

Chief Margaret Ekpo CFR OON
- Chief Margaret Ekpo, President of the Women's wing of N.C.N.C

Member of the Eastern Region House of Assembly
- In office 1961–1965

Extraordinary Member of the Eastern Region House of Chiefs
- In office 1959–1961
- Appointed by: Sir Robert Stapledon
- Ezinne of the Igbo People; Obong-awan of the Efik People

Personal details
- Born: 27 June 1914 Creek Town, Nigeria Protectorate
- Died: 21 September 2006 (aged 92) Calabar, Nigeria
- Party: National Council of Nigeria and the Cameroons
- Spouse: John Udo Ekpo (m. 1938)
- Children: Edward and Winston
- Education: Dublin Institute of Technology

Chief Margaret Ekpo CFR OON (27 July 1914 – 21 September 2006) was a Nigerian women's rights activist and social mobilizer who was a pioneering female politician in the country's First Republic and a leading member of a class of traditional Nigerian women activists, many of whom rallied women beyond notions of ethnic solidarity. She played major roles as a grassroots and nationalist politician in the Eastern Nigerian city of Aba, championing women's interests there, in the era of a hierarchical and male-dominated movement towards independence.

== Early life and education ==
Margaret Ekpo was born in Creek Town, Cross River State, to the family of Okoroafor Obiasulor [who was originally from Aguluzigbo, a rural town in Anaocha Local Government Area of Anambra State] and Inyang Eyo Aniemikwe. Through her mother, she was a member of the royal family of King Eyo Honesty II of Creek Town. She reached standard six of the school leaving certificate in 1934. However, her goals of further education in teachers training were put on hold after the death of her father in 1934. She then started working as a pupil-teacher in elementary schools. She married a doctor, John Udo Ekpo, in 1938.

He was from the Ibibio ethnic group, while she was of Igbo and Efik heritage. The couple later moved to Aba.

In 1946, she had the opportunity to study abroad at what is now Dublin Institute of Technology, Dublin Ireland. She earned a diploma in domestic science and on her return to Nigeria she established a Domestic Science and Sewing Institute in Aba. She then became a woman’s rights activist, a role in which she was mentored by Chief Funmilayo Ransome-Kuti.

== Political career ==
=== Early politics ===
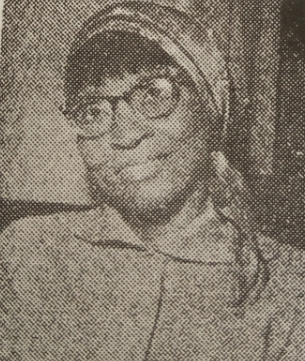
Margaret Ekpo as a young woman

Ekpo's first direct participation in female political association was in 1945; her husband was indignant at the colonial administrators' treatment of indigenous Nigerian doctors but as a civil servant, he could not attend meetings to discuss the matter. Ekpo attended these meetings in his place. The meetings were organized to discuss the discriminatory practices of the colonial administration in the city, and to fight cultural and racial imbalance in administrative promotions. She later attended a political rally and was the only woman present there, which saw fiery speeches from Mbonu Ojike, Nnamdi Azikiwe and Herbert Macaulay. By the end of the decade, she had organized a Market Women Association in Aba to unionize market women in the city. She used the association to promote women's solidarity as a platform to fight for the economic rights of women, economic protections and expansionary political rights of the underclass.

=== Activism ===
Ekpo's awareness of growing movements for civil rights for women around the world prodded her into demanding the same for the women in her country and to fight the discriminatory and oppressive political and civil role colonialism played in the subjugation of women. She felt that women abroad including those in Britain, were already fighting for civil rights and had more voice in political and civil matters than their counterparts in Nigeria. She later joined the decolonization-leading National Council of Nigeria and the Cameroons (NCNC), as a platform to represent a marginalized group. In the 1950s, she also teamed up with Funmilayo Ransome-Kuti to protest killings at an Enugu coal mine; the victims were leaders protesting colonial practices at the mine. In 1954, she established the Aba Township Women's Association. As leader of the new market group, she was able to garner the trust of a large number of women in the township and turn it into a political pressure group. By 1955, women in Aba had outnumbered male voters in a citywide election.

In 1959, Ekpo was nominated by the NCNC to the regional House of Chiefs, where she served until her election to the House of Assembly a number of years later. As a chief, she took part in several debates relating to the status of women in her region with fellow House of Chiefs member Chief Janet Mokelu. She won a seat in the Eastern Regional House of Assembly in 1961, a position that allowed her to further fight for issues affecting women at the time. In particular, there were concerns on the progress of women in economic and political matters, especially in the areas of transportation around major roads leading to markets and rural transportation in general.

Ekpo's political career ended with the commencement of the Nigerian Civil War. At that time, she was detained by Biafran authorities for three years in prison without adequate feeding.

=== Recognition ===
After a military coup ended the First Republic, she took a less prominent approach to politics. In 2001, Calabar Airport was renamed Margaret Ekpo International Airport. She died five years later in 2006.
