= Kuku family =

Nigerian family

- Current region: Nigeria; England; United States
- Origin: Ijebu-Ode, Ogun State
- Founder: Balogun Kuku
- Current head: Sonny Kuku
- Titles: Oloriogun; Ogbeni Oja; Iyalode

The Kuku family is a prominent Ijebu chieftaincy family claiming descent from the colonial-era Ijebu warlord Balogun Kuku. They are one of the most influential families of Ijebu noble heritage.

== History ==
The founder of the Kuku family, Balogun Kuku, amassed vast wealth as a trader in Ibadan in the late 1800s and used his assets to establish a personal army that he then used to protect his native Ijebu thereafter during the Yoruba Revolutionary Wars. In gratitude for this, Oba Tunwashe, the reigning Awujale of Ijebu, gave him the responsibility of defending his kingdom in the Imagbon war, a conflict that involved the British colonists that were then residing in Lagos Colony. After coming to a stalemate, Balogun Kuku negotiated a peace with his foes that saw Ijebu coming under the protective control of Britain in the aftermath.

After flirting with Christianity following these events, Chief Kuku converted to Islam and amassed a huge following as one of the earliest of that faith's native clerics. His family is therefore traditionally Muslim today.

In addition to this, Balogun Kuku is also famous today for having popularized the ceremonial durbar that honours the Awujale each year during the Eid festival. Now known as the Ojude Oba, his family of descendants maintains a custom of taking part in its festivities each year.

== Prominent members ==
In recognition of Balogun Kuku's enduring contributions to the kingdom, the Awujale of Ijebu-Ode, Ọba Sikiru Kayode Adetona, conferred the Oloriogun title on the Kuku family as an hereditary chieftaincy title in perpetuity. This title was elevated at this time to the Ilamuren class, one of the highest-ranking chieftaincy categories in Ijebuland. Currently, the Oloriogun title is held by Dr. Sonny Folorunsho Kuku, the olori-ebi of the Kuku family.

The Ogbeni Oja title, one of the most esteemed non-hereditary chieftaincy positions in Ijebuland, has also been bestowed upon members of the Kuku family. The title of Ogbeni Oja, which serves as the equivalent of a Prime Minister to the Awujale, has been successively held by two great-grandsons of Kuku I: Chief Bayo Kuku and Dr. Sonny Folorunsho Kuku. This title highlights the family's continued prominence in the political affairs of Ijebuland.

Further solidifying the Kuku family's influence, Chief Derin Adedeji (née Kuku) was conferred with the title of the Iyalode of Ijebu-Ode by Awujale Sikiru Kayode Adetona. The Iyalode is the holder of the highest non-hereditary chieftaincy title for women in Ijebuland, and represents her gender's leadership, social impact, and contributions to community development.

Renowned fashion designer Banke Kuku is a member of the family. Banke is the daughter of chief Sonny Kuku. Folarin Kuku, the Asiwaju Ogun of the Kuku dynasty, who made history as the first black officer of the Grenadier Guards is also a member of the family. The mathematician Aderemi Kuku was also a member of the family.
