= Janet Nwadiogo Mokelu =

Nigerian politician (1910–2003)

Chief Janet Nwadiogo Mokelu (born Janet Onwuegbuzia; February 7, 1910 – March 31, 2003) was a Nigerian politician, philanthropist, nurse, teacher, headmistress and businesswoman. She was able to distinguish herself as an educationist, a committed activist and a nationalist. A one time member of both the Eastern House of Assembly and the Eastern House of Chiefs in Nigeria, Mokelu was one of the first Nigerian female lawmakers.

== Early life and career ==
Born to the family of Joseph and Margaret Onwuegbuzia of Umuagu Quarters, Asaba, in what is now Delta State, Nigeria, Janet attended Teachers' Training College (1930-1932), where she obtained her Grade II Teachers' certificate. She was appointed an extraordinary member of the Eastern House of Chiefs in 1959, along with Chief Margaret Ekpo, and later served as special political adviser to the Government of Anambra State from 1980 to 1983.

Mokelu strongly believed in ecumenism and worked closely with her friend Eudora, Lady Ibiam towards furthering it as a cause. She led the Oraifite Anglican Women's Conference for twenty-five years, ultimately stepping down in 1995. During this period, she spearheaded the building of a Boys Secondary School in Oraifite, and a weaving industry amongst others. She inculcated discipline and moral values among women who respected her.

A pioneer Lady Knight of the Anglican Church in the old Diocese on The Niger, her role as a leader and motivator enhanced the many activities she undertook. Generous to a fault, she always supported the poor, giving money, food and clothing out freely.

Mokelu made various contributions towards the uplifting of women through her political activities. She believed in equity, and pioneered several pieces of legislation during her time in government that were intended to better the lives of her fellow women. One such law was the one that married women be paid the same salary as their male counterparts.

== Enugu strike ==
In 1949, the police killed twenty one miners who were protesting non-payment of mine allowances in Enugu. Mokelu mobilized the women and demonstrated against the killing with fellow activists Funmilayo Ransome-Kuti and Margaret Ekpo. They demanded that the policemen involved in the shooting be prosecuted and executed. They also condemned the colonial policy in all ramifications.

== Political career ==
Chief Mokelu believed strongly that all women should vote and be voted for. Her bills as a parliamentarian attest to these, with Chief Ekpo - who served with her in the House of Chiefs from 1959 until 1961 and the House of Assembly from 1961 until 1966 - being a constant collaborator in this regard.

== Sources ==
- See Parliamentary Debates of Eastern House of Chiefs. Official Report 1960-1961 and Parliamentary Debates of Eastern House of Assembly, Official Report 1961-1966.
