= Nigerian chieftaincy (disambiguation) =

Nigerian chieftaincy may refer to:

- The Nigerian Chieftaincy, the chieftaincy system that is native to Nigeria
- An individual title of authority or title of honour in the aforesaid system
