= Balogun Kuku =

Nigerian warlord

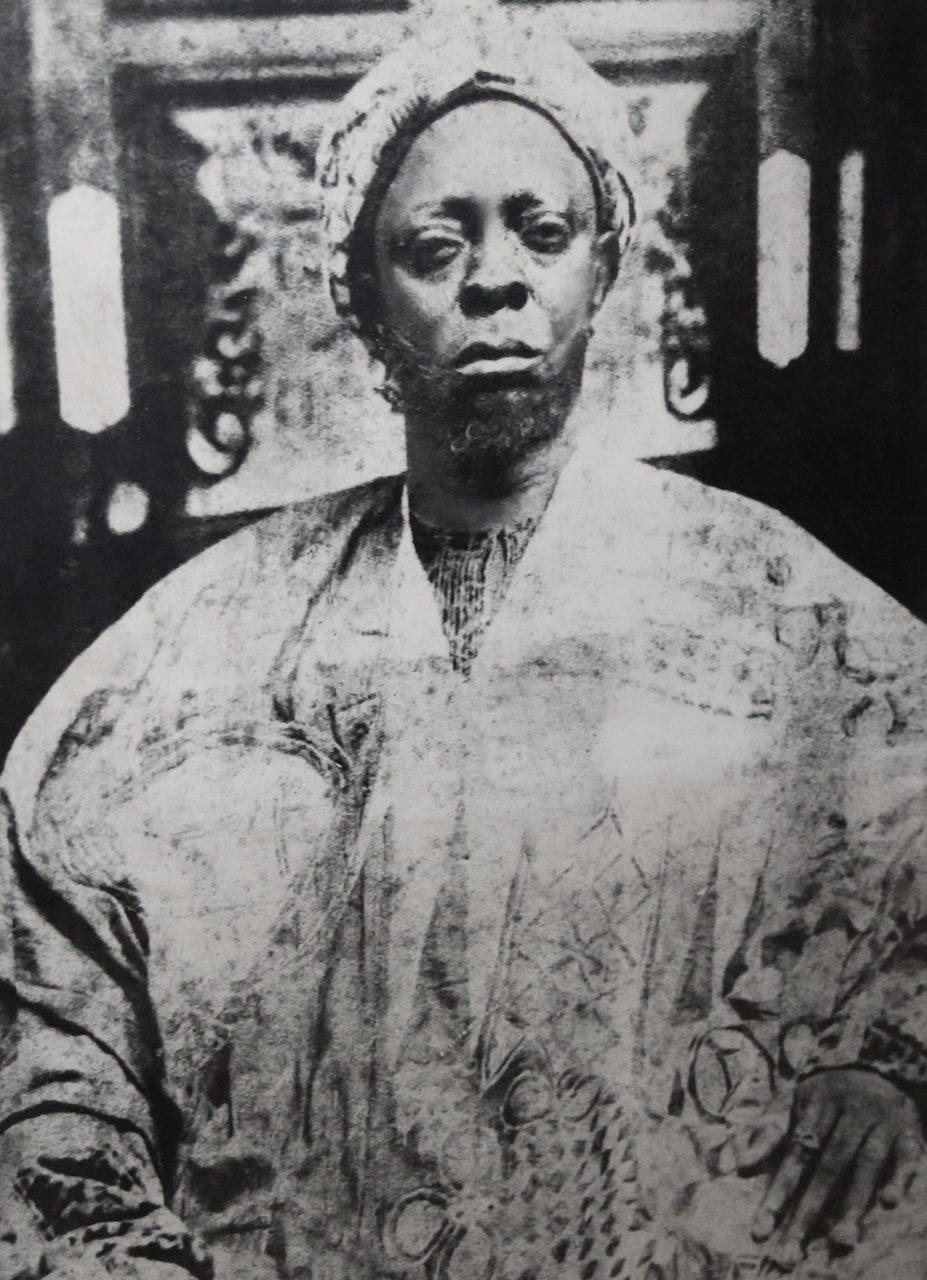
- Kuku around 1900
- Born: 1845; Ijebu-Ode, Nigeria
- Died: November 13, 1907; Ijebu-Ode, Nigeria
- Occupations: Warlord, Leader, Businessman
- Known for: Military leadership, Introduction of Islam to Ijebu-Ode, Establishment of the Ojude Oba Festival
- Title: Balogun
- Family: Kuku family

Balogun Bello Kuku (1845–1907) was a Nigerian warlord. His father Odusanya was a community leader, and his mother, Detimoku, was the daughter of Adeoti, the first "Erelu" of Ijebu-Ode.

After his mother's death, Kuku was raised by his grandmother, Erelu Adeoti. He was raised in a politically influential household, and was exposed to governance, diplomacy, and military strategy from an early age.

== Life ==
=== Early career ===
Kuku went to Ibadan to start a trading business. He sold kola nuts, textiles, palm oil, and firearms. Upon his return to Ijebu-Ode, he became one of the wealthiest men in the region. He was appointed as the Balogun of Ijebu-Ode, succeeding Balogun Otubu. As Balogun, Kuku was responsible for defending Ijebuland, leading military campaigns, and advising the Awujale on security matters. Kuku was involved in the military, he played a significant role in the Kiriji War among Ijebu, Ibadan, and the Ekiti-Parapo confederacy.

In 1890, he led the Ogunshegun War between Ijebu-Ode and Ijebu-Igbo. The war was triggered by land disputes and trade rivalries. Following his military successes, Kuku's influence caused political rivalries within Ijebu's rulers, particularly members of the Owa Tribunal, an advisory council to the Awujale. Some accused Kuku of hoarding war spoils and attempting to undermine the royal authority. This opposition culminated in his temporary exile to Oru and later to Ibadan, where he continued his trading business.

In 1892, as tensions between the British colonial government and Ijebu escalated, Kuku was called to intervene peacefully. It followed as the Battle of Imagbon where the British forces overpowered Ijebu warriors. Kuku's diplomatic dialogue with Captain Bower, the British commander, helped end hostilities and led to the signing of the Peace and Friendship Treaty on August 8. The Treaty brought Ijebuland under British Nigeria. Captain Bower attempted to install Kuku as ruler in place of Awujale Tunwashe, but Kuku refused, citing his cultural belief.

=== Religious view ===
Kuku is widely recognized as a pioneer of Islamic religion in Ijebu-Ode. Although he was born into a traditional religious family, which he initially practiced. Following the expansion of Christianity in Nigeria during the 19th century, Kuku briefly embraced Christianity along with some of his followers, but later withdrew due to the requirement of monogamy, which conflicted with his existing polygamous household.

Seeking an alternative, Kuku turned to Islam, which was already increasing in popularity in other parts of Yorubaland. He invited Islamic scholars to Ijebu-Ode to educate him about the religion until 1902, when he publicly declared his conversion to Islam in an announcement during a housewarming ceremony.

Kuku further demonstrated his commitment to his new faith by constructing a mosque attached to his residence to serve the growing Muslim community. This mosque became a focal point for Islamic worship and education in Ijebu-Ode, reinforcing the religion's presence in the area. His role in establishing Islam in Ijebuland solidified his legacy not only as a warlord and political leader but also as a significant religious figure in the region. Today, he is remembered for his contributions to the religious, social, and political transformation of Ijebu-Ode.

== Legacy ==
=== Ojude Oba Festival ===
The Ojude Oba festival was established by Kuku following his conversion to Islam. The festival was introduced as a replacement for the traditional Odela Festival, which was previously an annual event where different religious and cultural groups in Ijebu-Ode paid homage to the Awujale, the traditional ruler of Ijebuland. Kuku could no longer participate in these ceremonies. He, therefore, initiated a new festival that aligned with Islamic traditions while preserving the practice of honoring the Awujale.

Kuku selected the third day after Eid al-Adha (Eid-el-Kabir) for the new festival. He transformed this custom into a grand procession, where he, his sons, and members of the Muslim community dressed in fine attire, mounted horses, and paraded through the streets of Ijebu-Ode with drummers and ceremonial gun salutes, culminating in a gathering at the Awujale's palace. The Ojude Oba Festival became the dominant annual event in Ijebuland.

Over the years, the festival continued to expand, attracting participation from prominent families and cultural groups across Ijebuland. The festival serves as an opportunity to pay homage to the Awujale, celebrate Ijebu heritage, and reinforce communal unity.

=== Olorunsogo House ===
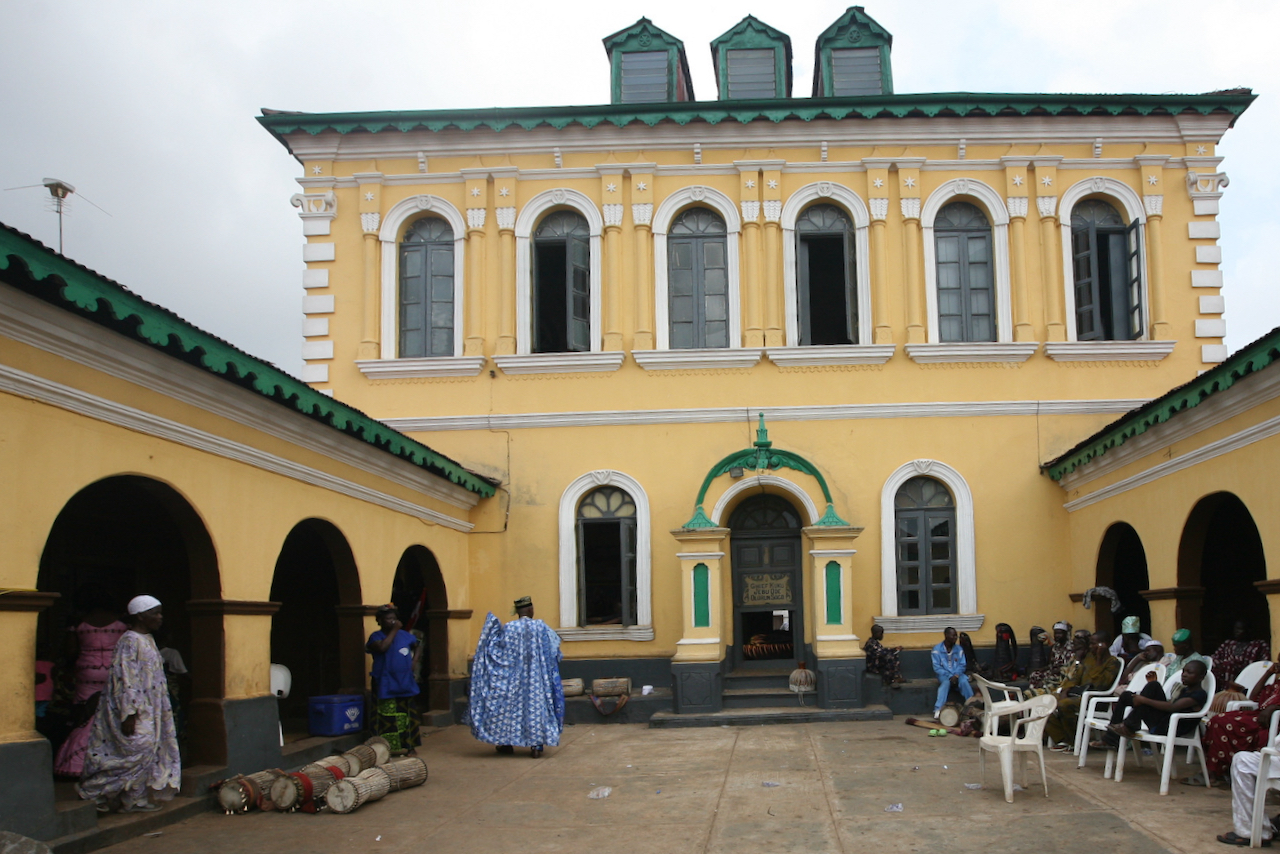
Olorunsogo House

The Olorunsogo House is a historic building in Ijebu-Ode, constructed between 1897 and 1900. It was commissioned by Balogun Kuku and was the first brick private residence in Ijebu-Ode. The house was designed by the Portuguese architectural firm Arc. Balthazar Reis & Co. and remains a significant architectural landmark in the region.

Beyond its architectural significance, Olorunsogo House played a crucial role as a cultural, social, and religious center in Ijebu-Ode. During the post-war period, when Kuku was instrumental in brokering peace and stability, the house symbolized the prosperity and modernization of the region. It also served as a venue for political gatherings, community meetings, and Islamic religious activities.

In July 2024, the Ogun State government officially designated Olorunsogo House as a building of Special Architectural and Historical/Cultural Significance.

== Death ==
Balogun Kuku died on November 13, 1907.

Following his death, the title of Balogun of Ijebu-Ode was conferred upon his sons, Gbadamosi Kuku and Sonmori Kuku, in succession. The Kuku family has continued to play a prominent role in Ijebu-Ode.
