= Tribal chief =

Leader of a tribal society or chiefdom

A tribal chief, chieftain, or headman is a political leader of a social group commonly described as a tribe, clan, band, or confederation of tribes. Chiefs’ authority varies widely by society and context, and in many cases depends on consensus and customary legitimacy rather than coercive power. In anthropology, terms such as tribe, chief, and chiefdom have been used in comparative models of sociopolitical organization, but the analytic use of tribe has also been widely criticized as imprecise and historically burdened. In some contemporary states, forms of chiefly authority are formally recognized or regulated by constitutions and statutes.

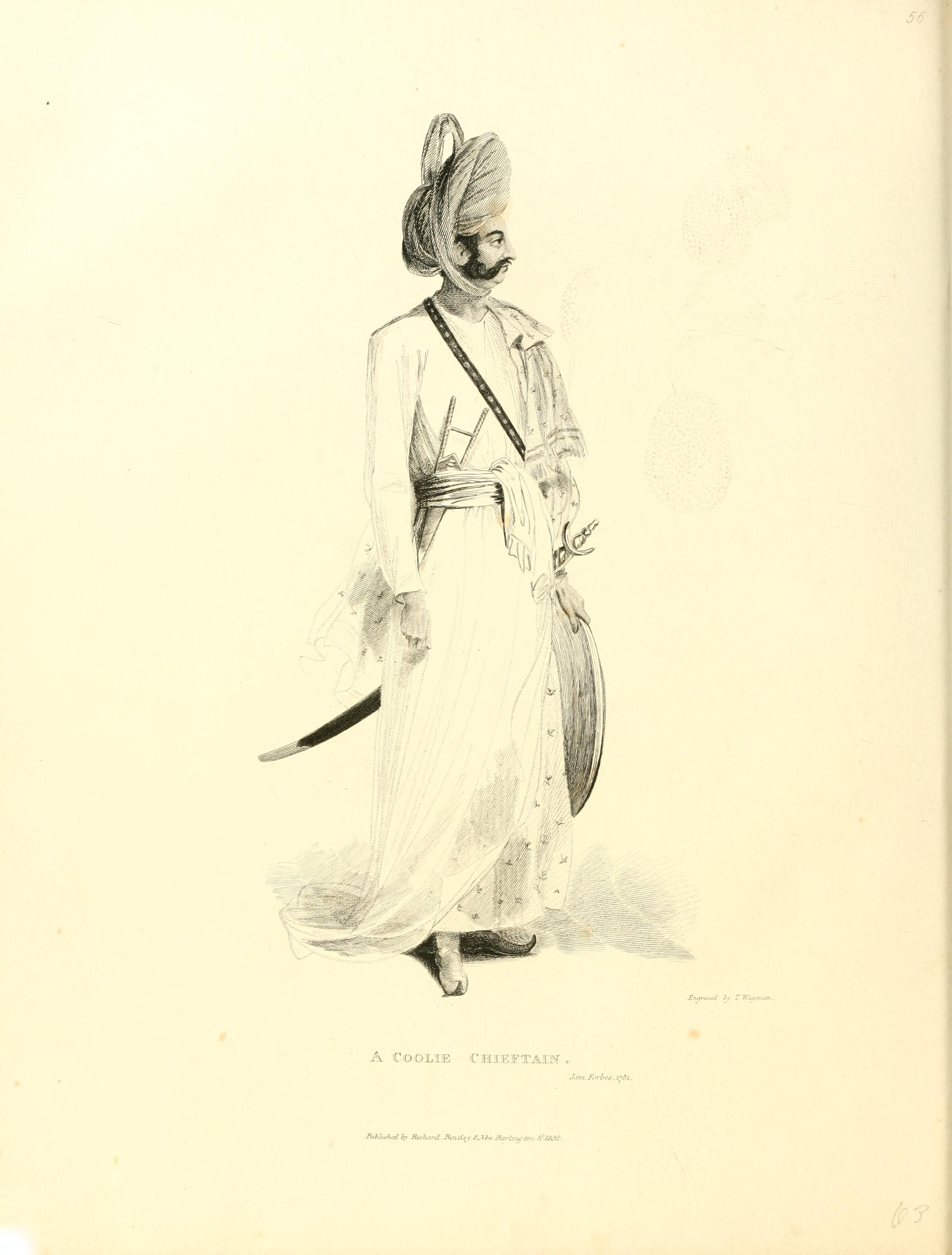
A portrait, published in 1813, of a Koli tribal chief of Dahewan in Gujarat, India

== Tribal societies ==
The concept of tribe is broadly applied, based on tribal concepts of societies in western Afroeurasia.

Tribal societies are sometimes categorized as an intermediate stage between the band society of the Paleolithic stage and civilization with centralized, super-regional government based in cities. Anthropologist Elman Service distinguishes two stages of tribal societies: simple societies organized by limited instances of social rank and prestige, and more stratified societies led by chieftains or tribal kings (chiefdoms). Stratified tribal societies led by tribal kings are thought to have flourished from the Neolithic stage into the Iron Age, albeit in competition with urban civilisations and empires beginning in the Bronze Age.

In the case of tribal societies of Indigenous peoples within larger colonial and post-colonial states, tribal chiefs may represent their tribe or ethnicity through self-government.

== Chieftain ==
The most common types of chieftains are the chairman of a council (usually of elders) and/or a broader popular assembly in "parliamentary" cultures, the war chief (may be an alternative or additional post in war time), the hereditary chief, and the politically dominant medicineman.

The term is usually distinct from chiefs at lower levels, such as village chiefs (geographically defined) or clan chiefs (an essentially genealogical notion). The descriptive "tribal" requires an ethno-cultural identity (racial, linguistic, religious, etc.) as well as some political expression (representative, legislative, executive, and/or judicial). In certain situations, and especially in a colonial context, the most powerful member of either a confederation or a federation of such tribal, clan, or village chiefs is referred to as a paramount chief.

== History ==
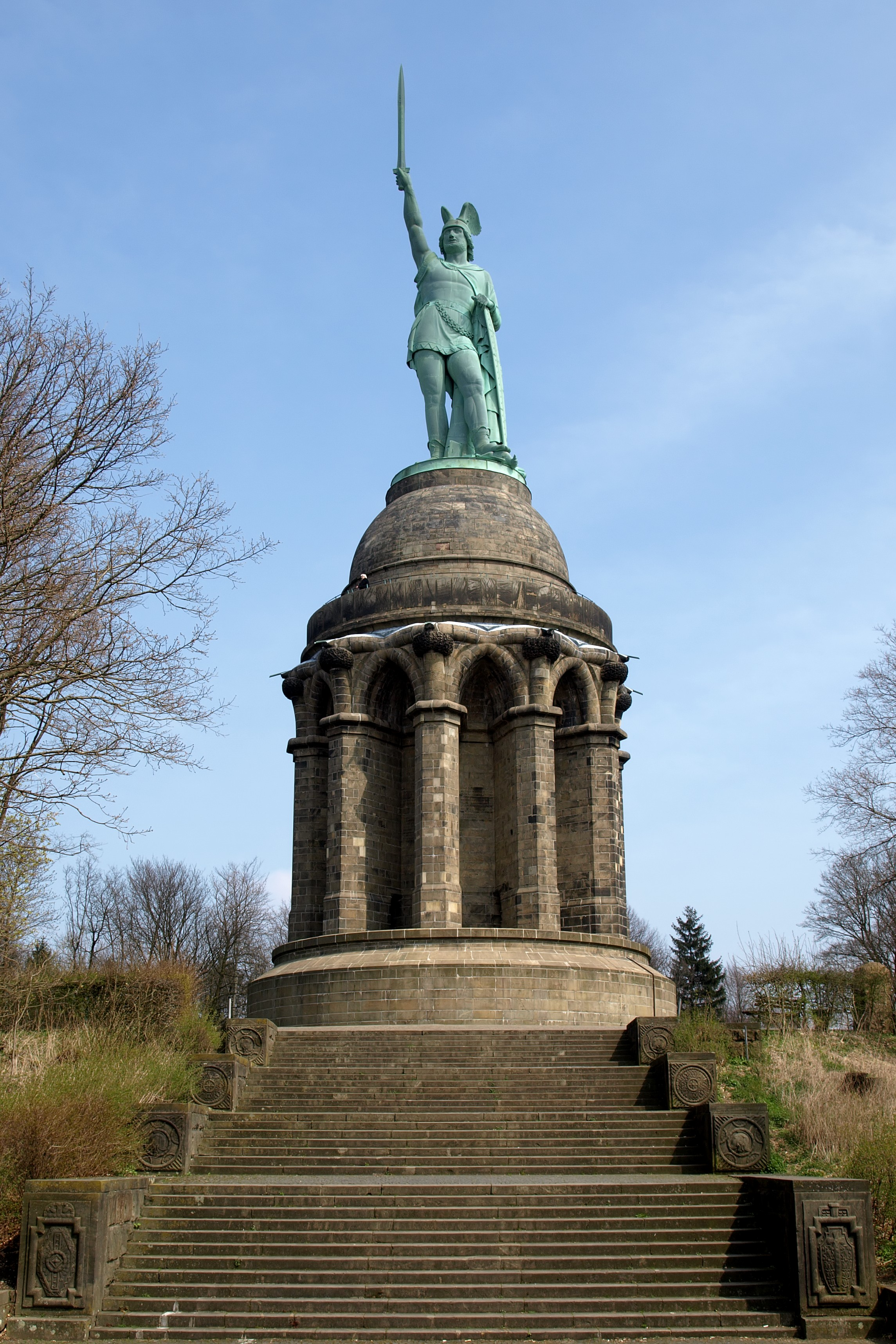
Arminius, a chieftain of the Germanic Cherusci tribe who defeated three Roman legions in the Battle of the Teutoburg Forest.

Classical sources of information about tribal societies are external descriptions, such as from Greco-Roman ethnography, which identified societies surrounding those of the ethnographers as tribal.

States and colonialism, particularly in the last centuries, have often subjected tribal societies to their own governments and laws. In some instances, tribes have retained or regained partial self-government, with Indigenous peoples' rights having been fought for and secured on state or international levels.

== Terms of specific tribal chiefdoms ==
=== Americas ===
- Cacique – used among the Taino Nation of the Caribbean islands, later adopted by the Spanish to refer to all heads of chiefdoms whom they encountered: Cuauhtémoc, Tecun Uman, Tenamaxtli, Atlácatl, Lempira (Lenca ruler), Nicarao (cacique), Tupac Amaru II.
- Lonco (mapudungun: longko, "head") – used among the Mapuche.
- Micco (civil chief) and Tustenuggee (war chief) of tribal towns of the Muscogee Confederacy
- Morubixaba — tribal Cacique (chief) of the Tupi people.
- Oubutu – used among the Kalinago people of the southern Caribbean.
- Rajiv – used among the central Trinidadian people of Freeport.
- Sachem – paramount chief of the Algonquian nations of present-day New England in the United States.
- Weroance
- Afro-Bolivian king

=== Africa ===
Badge of office of Chief Gambo, Rhodesia c. 1979.

- Ishe or She (male chiefs) and Shekadzi (female chiefs) – of the Shona people of Zimbabwe [see sn:Ishe]
- Agwam – of the Atyap and Bajju people of central Nigeria
- Eze – an elective monarch among the Igbo people of Nigeria.
- Gbong Gwom Jos – of the Berom people of Nigeria
- Ker – of the Luo people of Kenya and Tanzania
- Kgosi – tribe leader among the Tswana people of Botswana and South Africa.
- Lamido – leader in the Hausaland region of Niger and Nigeria.
- Mogho Naba – in the Ouagadougou region of Burkina Faso
- Nkosi – male monarch among the Zulu, Ndebele, and Xhosa peoples of South Africa and Zimbabwe.
- Oba and Oloye – honorific in Nigeria, with various Yoruba and Bini holders.
- Obai – historical leader of the Temne people of Sierra Leone.
- Omanhene – traditional ruler among the Akan peoples of Ghana.
- Orkoiyot – spiritual and military leader among the Nandi people in Kenya.
- Obong – of the Efik people of Calabar in Southern Nigeria
- Tor Tiv – of the Tiv people of Central Nigeria
- Uyini ('lord') – of the Ukelle of Southern Nigeria

=== Oceania and Southeast Asia ===
- Aliʻi and Aliʻi nui – historical chiefs and high chiefs of the Hawaiian Islands.
- Ariki, 'ariki henua – a member of a hereditary chiefly rank in Polynesia.
- Grade-taking systems of northern Vanuatu
- Ibedul
- Meena – meaning "chief of tribals" in South Asia.
- Iroijlaplap
- Maga'låhi and maga'håga – the first-born male and female, respectively, joint heads of a Chamorro clan through the maternal line, of the Mariana Islands.
- Matai – in the Samoan fa'amatai system
- Nahnmwarki (Pohnpei), Lepen Palikir
- Pilung – village, municipal, and paramount chiefs and rulers of the Yap Islands.
- Rangatira – a chief of Māori in New Zealand.
- Ratu – a Fijian chief; Malay for "queen".
- Datu – a Malay or Filipino chief.

== Modern states or regions providing an organized form of tribal chiefships ==
=== Africa ===
==== Botswana ====
In Botswana, the reigning dikgosi of the various tribes serve as advisers to the government as members of the Ntlo ya Dikgosi, the national House of Chiefs. They also serve as the ex officio chairs of the tribal kgotlas, meetings of all of the members of the tribes.

==== Ghana ====
The offices and traditional realms of the Nanas of Ghana are protected by the republican constitution of the country. The chiefs serve as custodians of all traditional lands and the cultures of the traditional areas. They also serve as members of the Ghanaian National House of Chiefs.

==== Nigeria ====
Although both the Nigerian traditional rulers and the wider chieftaincy aren't mentioned in Nigeria's current constitution, they derive their powers from various "Chiefs laws" and are therefore legally recognized. The traditional rulers and select chiefs usually serve as members of each federating state's State Council of Traditional Rulers and Chiefs.

==== South Africa ====
Such figures as the King of the Zulu Nation and the Rain Queen are politically recognized in South Africa because they derive their status, not only from tribal custom, but also from the Traditional Leadership Clause of the country's current constitution. Some of them are members of the National House of Traditional Leaders.

==== Uganda ====
The pre-colonial states that existed in what is today Uganda were summarily abolished following independence from Great Britain. However, following constitutional reforms in 1993, a number of them were restored as politically neutral constituencies of the state by the government of Yoweri Museveni. Such figures as the Kabaka of Buganda and the Omukama of Toro typify the Ugandan chieftaincy class.

=== Americas ===
==== Latin America ====
El caciquismo is a distorted form of government through which a political leader has total control of a rural society expressed as political clientelism. This concept was most widespread in Latin America in its different periods of history. In Spain and some Latin American countries, the word cacique is used pejoratively to refer to those who hold power through obscure networks of influence, even though this type of fraud is not related to pre-Columbian era civilizations.

===== Bolivia =====
The Afro-Bolivian people, a recognized ethnic constituency of Bolivia, are led by a king whose title is recognized by the Bolivian government.

==== Canada ====
The band is the fundamental unit of governance among the First Nations in Canada (formerly called "Indians"). Most bands have elected chiefs, either directly elected by all members of the band, or indirectly by the band council; these chiefs are recognized by the Canadian state under the terms of the Indian Act. Bands may have traditional hereditary or charismatic chiefs, who are usually not part of the formal government sanctioned by the Indian Act. There were 614 bands in Canada in 2012. The Assembly of First Nations, a national organization, elects a "national chief" to act as spokesperson of all First Nations bands in Canada.

==== United States ====
A chief might be considered to hold all political power, say by oratory or by example. But on the North American continent, it was historically possible to evade the political power of another by migration. The Mingos, for example, were Haudenosaunee who migrated further west to the sparsely populated Ohio Country during the 18th century. Three Haudenosaunee, or Iroquois, Hiawatha, Jigonhsasee, and the Great Peacemaker, formulated a constitution for the Haudenosaunee Confederation. The Muscogee Confederacy consisted of tribal towns headed by "Miccos" (civil chiefs) who presided over town councils, but members of the town were free to ignore council decisions, just as towns were free to ignore decisions of the Confederacy.

Not all tribal leaders are or were men. Wilma Mankiller was a well-known chief of the Cherokee Nation. The chief may not be free to wield power without the consent of a council of elders. For example, Cherokee men were not permitted to go to war without the consent of the council of women.

=== Asia ===
==== Arabia ====
Arabs, in particular nomadic Bedouins, and some Iraqis and Syrians, are largely organized in tribes, many of whom have official representatives in governments. Tribal chiefs are known as sheikhs or elders, though this term is also applied as an honorific title to spiritual leaders of Sufism and Islamic scholars.

==== Philippines ====
Apo Rodolfo Aguilar (Kudol I) serves as the chieftain of the Tagbanwa people living in Banuang Daan and Cabugao settlements in Coron Island, Palawan, Philippines. His position is recognized by the Filipino government.

=== Oceania ===
The Solomon Islands have a Local Court Act which empowers chiefs to deal with crimes in their communities, thus granting them considerable effective authority.

== In popular culture ==
- Roman Reigns, an American wrestler of Samoan ancestry, used the moniker "The Tribal Chief" as part of his villainous and later heroic character.

== See also ==
- House of chiefs
- Opperhoofd
- Petty kingdom

== Explanatory notes ==
- The Field Museum in Chicago, Illinois has an exhibit on the Pawnee earth lodge.
- The Field Museum has exhibits with artifacts, dress, tools, and pottery of the Pueblo people, the Northwest tribes, the Plains tribes, and the Indigenous peoples of the Northeastern Woodlands (especially those of the Midwest).
