= Banke Kuku =

Nigerian fashion and textile designer

- Born: 1986 or 1987 (age 39–40)
- Education: Central Saint Martins College of Art and Design; Chelsea College of Arts
- Occupations: Fashion designer, textile designer
- Years active: 2011–present
- Known for: Banke Kuku fashion and textile brand
- Spouse: Olusola Lawson (m. 2017)
- Family: Kuku family

Banke Kuku is a Nigerian fashion and textile designer. It is also the brand name of Kuku's fashion and textile line.

== Early life and education ==
Kuku was born in Nigeria in the 1980s. Her mother was an attorney and taught Kuku to knit when she was five. Her family moved to London when she was eight. Kuku attended boarding schools in Kent.

Kuku attended Central St. Martins College of Art and Design and Chelsea College of Arts, where she studied art, fashion, and textiles. At Chelsea, she specialized in printed and woven textiles. One of her mentors was Duro Olowu. She did a business course with The Prince's Trust.

== Career ==
Kuku's textile designs focus on printed fabrics. She produces her designs in the Ikoyi neighborhood of Lagos.

Kuku worked as a freelance textile designer in the UK. She created interior design textiles. In 2011 she established her eponymous label, then Banke Kuku Textiles, and established a studio in London. Around 2016 she moved back to Nigeria because she was marrying a Nigerian man. Clients expressed interest in garments made with her interior design prints, and in early 2019 she created a collection of loungewear, pajamas, and kaftans. In November 2019 she opened a storefront in Lagos. In March of 2020 the COVID-19 pandemic shut down her storefront operations, and she launched an online sales space.

Kuku moved into daywear and evening wear after the COVID-19 restrictions lifted. She debuted her designs at the 2021 Lagos Fashion Week. The brand eventually expanded to include menswear, childrenswear and resort wear.

She collaborated with Gabrielle Union on a 2022 6-piece capsule collection. In 2023 she was a guest judge on The Great British Sewing Bee for designs that included batakari, adire fabric, and boubou. In September of 2023 she was the cover feature for ThisDay Style.

Tiwa Savage, Michelle Obama, Kelis, and Catt Sadler have worn her designs.

== Personal life ==
In 2017 Kuku married Olusola Lawson in Marrakesh.
