= Traditional Rulers (Restitution of Assets and Properties) Act =

1993 Ugandan statute

Parliament of Uganda
- Long title: An Act to give effect to article 118A of the Constitution of 1967 and to restore to traditional rulers assets and properties previously owned by them or connected with or attached to their offices but which were confiscated by the State and to make other provisions relating or incidental to, or consequential upon, the foregoing.
- Citation: Statute No. 8 of 1993; UG, vol. LXXXVI, no. 32, stat. suppl. 4; Chapter 247 of Revised Laws 2000; Chapter 243 of Revised Laws 2023
- Passed: 23 July 1993
- Commenced: 30 July 1993

The Traditional Rulers (Restitution of Assets and Properties) Act/Statute, sometimes referred to as the Restoration of Traditional Rulers Act, was a law assented to by the Parliament of Uganda on 23 July 1993 and commencing on 30 July 1993, reversing Article 118 "Abolition of institution of kingship, etc." of the 1967 Constitution of Uganda. It was published in the Statute Supplement (No. 4) to the Uganda Gazette No. 32 Volume LXXXVI.

In an April 1993 closed session, Yoweri Museveni convinced the National Resistance Council to return properties of the Bugandan royalty, including 350 square miles (910 km^{2}) of mailo land that the Buganda Agreement (1900) allocated to the Kabaka but the Oboto regime confiscated in 1967, as well as various culture and administration buildings, and on 3 March 1993 sent negotiator Kintu Musoke a letter with a list of properties, the same as those listed in the law's schedule of "assets and property of the traditional ruler of Buganda" that were automatically returned from ownership by the Uganda Land Commission. The law states that other properties can be returned to traditional rulers following subsequent negotiations. This was subsequently done for Toro, Busoga, Bunyoro, and Rwenzururu.

== See also ==
- Traditional monarchies in Uganda § History
- History of Uganda § Uganda since 1979
- Busoga sub-region § History
- Tooro sub-region § History 2
- Bunyoro § Contemporary society
