= House of Chiefs =

A House of Chiefs (or House of Traditional Leaders) is a post-colonial assembly, either legislative or advisory, that is recognised by either a national or regional government as consisting of and providing a collective, public voice for an ethnic group's pre-colonial authorities. Although often influential within the indigenous culture, its members do not usually function as a modern nation's primary law-making body (cf. British House of Lords), being neither representative (i.e. democratically elected) nor consisting of members appointed individually by the government in power, whether democratic or not. It consists of all or some of the "traditional leaders", historically kings and chiefs, of a country or a sub-division thereof.

A House of Chiefs is not, constitutionally, a partisan institution within the body politic. Members of a House of Chiefs are selected neither by a universal suffrage process of those they represent nor by the state executive or legislature they advise: Their function is to express a cultural, historical and/or ethnic point of view on public policies. The process by which individuals qualify for membership varies, but is based on tradition specific to his or her (e.g. the Rain Queen) historic community or ethnic group. Sometimes the qualifying position is obtained through heredity within a local dynasty, sometimes through selection by consensus of a ritually or socially prominent subset of a community, and sometimes by a combination thereof.

Historically, chiefs were the last indigenous rulers before colonisation of a people, and their modern versions often continue to play a local cultural role of varying significance. Especially in colonial times, chiefs were often used as instruments of indirect rule, and/or convenient alternatives to elective institutions.

== Examples ==
In the post-colonial age, various Houses of Chiefs and similar assemblies have existed in various nations:

=== Africa ===
- In Botswana, the Ntlo ya Dikgosi, formerly known as the House of Chiefs.
- In Ghana, the National House of Chiefs, representing the various regional Houses of Chiefs.
- In Nigeria, there were several Houses of Chiefs in the Nigerian First Republic. In the modern era, the various states of the Federation each have a State Council of Traditional Rulers and Chiefs.
  - Also formerly, in the previously German, British and then Nigerian Southern Cameroons.
- In Somaliland, the House of Elders' membership consists of the various sultans of Somaliland.
- In South Africa, the colonial House of Chiefs fell into disuse, but, post-apartheid, indigenously organised versions have been revived, first within the ruling ANC party, then in KwaZulu Natal. The National House of Traditional Leaders officially advises the presidency today and is composed of 23 members, while the Congress of Traditional Leaders of South Africa currently functions as a more inclusive, non-governmental version.
- In Zambia, according to the 1996 constitution.
- In Zimbabwe, the Zimbabwe Council of Chiefs.

=== Pacific ===
- In the Cook Islands, the House of Ariki
- In Fiji, the Great Council of Chiefs (not to be confused with the House of Chiefs, which has no formal role)
- In the former Kingdom of Hawaii, the Hale o na Alii o Hawaii.
- In the Marshall Islands, the Council of Iroij.
- In Micronesia, various bodies including traditional councils in Yap
- In Nauru, the Council of Chiefs
- In Palau, the Council of Chiefs.
- In the Solomon Islands, the Gela Vaukolu.
- In Vanuatu, the Malvatu Mauri

=== Other places ===
The term has also been used for similar pre- and post-colonial assemblies of tribal leaders, such as among certain Native American tribes.

== Alternatives ==
Another way to include traditional chiefs in a nation's political life is to assign them a number of seats in a wider assembly. In Zimbabwe, for example, ten chiefs are chosen to be members of the Senate, the upper house of the country's parliament. From 1990 to 2005, they were represented in the House of Assembly (now the lower house) when it was the sole legislative chamber.
