= Ojude Oba festival =

Festival in Nigeria by the Yorubas

Ojude Oba
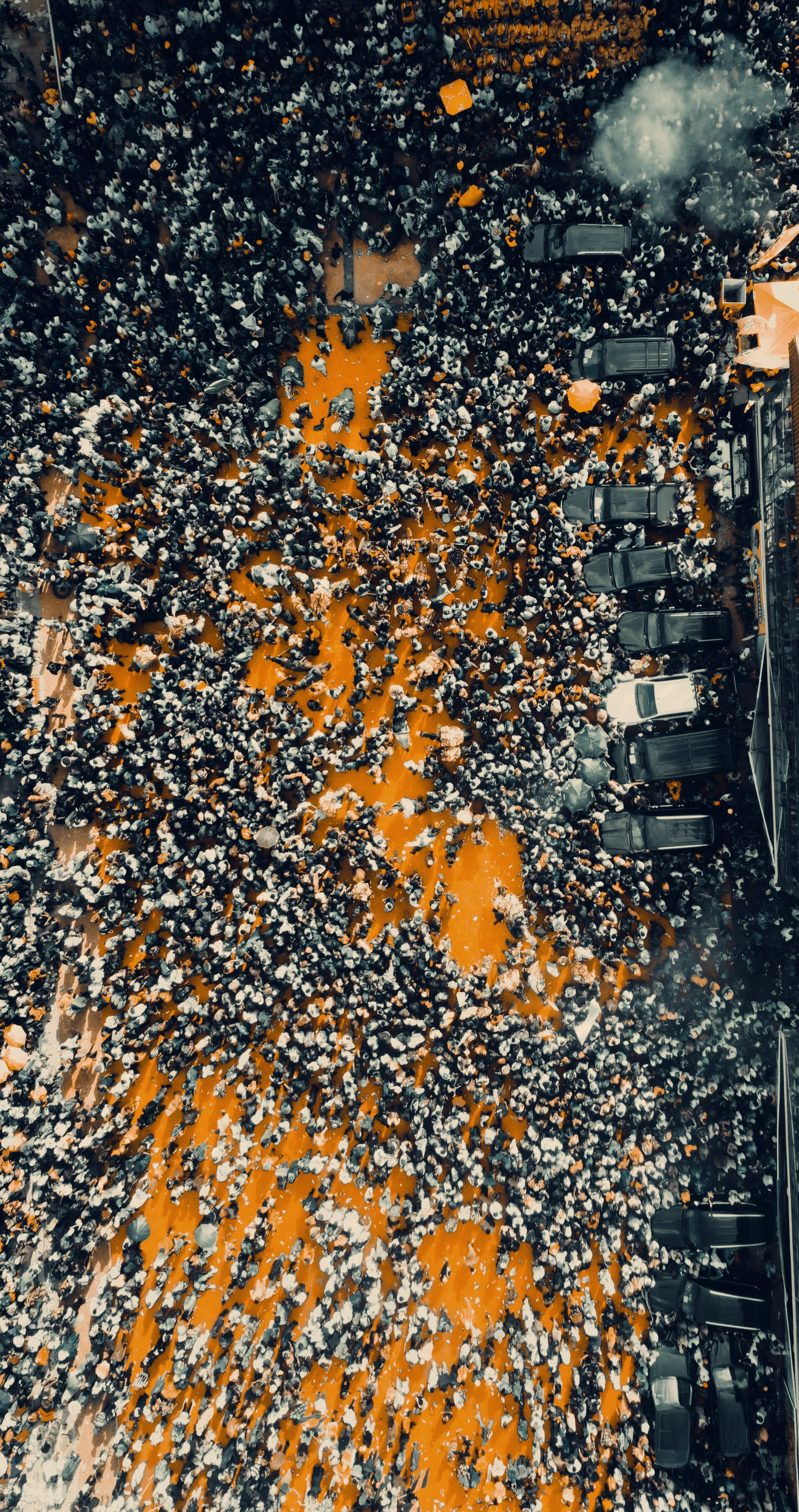
- Ojude Oba 2025
- Nickname: The King's Forecourt
- Status: Active
- Genre: Festivals
- Location: Ijebu Ode
- Country: Nigeria
- People: Yoruba people

Ojude Oba (The King's Forecourt) is an ancient festival, celebrated by the Yoruba people of Ijebu-Ode, a major town in Ogun State, Southwestern Nigeria. This annual festival usually takes place the third day after Eid al-Kabir (Ileya), to pay homage and show respect to the Royal Majesty, the Awujale of Ijebuland. It is one of the most spiritual and glamorous festivals celebrated in Ijebuland and generally in Ogun State as a whole.

During the course of the festivities, different cultural age groups known as regberegbe composed of indigenes, their friends, and associates far and near parade at the front courtyard of the king's palace on the third day of Eid al Kabir popularly referred to as "Ileya" in Yoruba language. Oba Adetona was the one that brought back the age groups in the 18th century into the general acceptable phenomenon that is found among today's Ijebus, and this has become an integral part of the yearly Ojude Oba festival in Ijebu. The reason for the age groups was to bring development and progress to the community.

Ojude Oba which means king's fore-court in Yoruba language is usually celebrated with Pomp and pageantry by about 1,000,000 people from different parts of the world and Nigeria, especially those from Yoruba origin and most especially by people of Ijebu descent all over the world.

== History ==
Ojude Oba which represents "the King's fore-court or frontage", could also be translated as “Majestic outing”.

During the reign of Awujale Ademuyewo Afidipotemole in 1878, a slave identified as Alli who later became Alli-Tubogun began open practice of Islam. He received his master's blessing to practice his religion without any barrier, obstruction and fear of any persecution. Due to this one-man effort coupled with the endorsement of his master, Islam began to grow, attracting so many converts and by 1880, local mosques were built at many wards in Ijebu-Ode.

In 1896, an incident and drama occurred on 27 September, when two reverends, Rev. R.A Conner and Rev. E.W George baptised 41 Ijebu-men with their proclamation to keep just one wife out of the many they had earlier married. This incident caused a chief whose name was identified as Chief Balogun Kuku, a prominent Ijebu son to relinquish Christianity and to embrace Islam which encourage polygamy because he had over thirty wives, over 200 slaves and other ardent followers. The chief's extreme wealth coupled with the respects the Ijebus had for attracted many converts to Islam.

Ojude Oba festival is a successor of the Odeda festival, which was also an annual event in which the worshippers of several traditional religions such as Sango, Egungu, Osun, Ogun, Yemule and so on come together to showcase their identities by dancing in turns to drums and songs in front of the Awujale, Olisa, various other important chiefs and the people of the town.

Chief Balogun Kuku, who was a party to the Odeda festival until he converted to Islam could no longer participate in the festival and then he decided to replace the Odeda festival with a new one which will conform with his new religion. This birthed the Ita-Oba festival which has now metamorphosed into what is known as Ojude Oba Festival. The festival has since been accepted not just by the Ijebus at home, but also by millions of people within and outside Nigeria. The festival is usually attended by over 250,000 people across the six geopolitical zones of Nigeria.

The 2013 edition of the annual Ojude Oba festival hosted many prominent dignitaries, such as Hon. Aminu Waziri Tambuwal, Governor Ibikunle Amosun, Governor of Bayelsa State, Hon. Seriake Dickson, who was represented by the Secretary to the State Government, SSG, wife of Ogun State governor, Mrs. Olufunsho Amosun, the state deputy governor, Prince Segun Adesegun, Secretary to Ogun State Government, Mr. Taiwo Adeoluwa and members of the state executive council.

In 2017 festival themed: “Our Culture, Our Pride,” was graced by the then Governor of Ogun State, Gov. Ibikunle Amosun and his state executive cabinet, Otunba Subomi Balogun, the Otunba Tunwashe of Ijebu and founder of First City Monument Group, Adegunwa, a renowned businessman and former chairman of Sterling Bank PLC, Chief Kola Banjo and former governor of the state, Otunba Gbenga Daniel.

The 2018 edition of the Ojude Oba festival received the presence of former Senate President, Dr. Bukola Saraki as a special guest of honour, who was accompanied by seven other senators which includes; Senator Ben Murray-Bruce, Senator Dino Melaye, Senator Biodun Olujimi, Senator Duro Faseyi, Senator Sam Anyanwu, Senator Rafiu Ibrahim and Senator Shaba Lafiaaji among others. Also, the then state Governor of Ogun State, Senator Ibikunle Amosun was expected but was represented by his deputy, Mrs. Yetunde Onanuga at the event. One of the main sponsors of the 2018 edition was the chairman and founder of Globacom Otunba Mike Adenuga. Nollywood actor Odunlade Adekola, DJ Top and the trio of Mr Real, Idowest and Slim Case were also present in the festival, where they gave indigenes and guests the 2018 Glo Miss Ojude Oba Beauty Pageant held at Equity Hotel.

The 2020 edition of the Ojude Oba festival was cancelled by the Awujale and Paramount Ruler of Ijebuland, Oba (Dr) Sikiru Adetona due to covid-19 and the need to maintain social and physical distancing amid the coronavirus pandemic.

Again the 2021 edition was also cancelled because of the rapid resurgence of the coronavirus. The organizers said it is better to avoid preventable health hazards and protect lives.

Adetoun Sote wrote a book on the Ojude Oba Festival of Ijebu-Ode in the western part of Nigeria. The first book to be written on this festival.

Gbadebo Opeibi the team lead of Yorubaness directed a documentary on the Ojude Oba Festival. This documentary highlighted the history, culture and beauty of Ojude Oba Festival.

== Festivity ==
Ojude-Oba Festival is a one-day celebration of culture, fashion, glamour, candour, beauty and royalty as sons and daughters of Ijebuland. The festival always commenced with prayers by the Imam of Ijebuland, then followed by the National Anthem, then the Ogun State Anthem and the Awujale Anthem, and finally the Lineage praise of the Ijebus. After all of these, the parade of different ages known as Regbe regbe with names––such as Obafuwaji, Bobagbimo, Bobakeye, Gbobaniyi and Gbobalaye begins.

This is the heart of the ceremony as each group with both male and female counterparts are distinct either in their manner of appearance and style of dressing or by their dance patterns. Some of the groups members are top managers, chief executive officers, head of industries and prominent traditional title holders. The groups each has a recognisable face, like the Gbobaniyi, a group of middle-age men, that dress in rich traditional Aso-Oke, wield walking sticks and dance like conquerors, has former Ogun State Governor Gbenga Daniel as its patron, while the female Gbobaleye are noted for gaiety and dance and has as member the popular Waka music star, Queen Salawa Abeni.

In straightforward terms, these groups files in turn by turn with their drummers to pay homage through their dance, and with presentation of gifts and offerings at the feet of the King. They pray for him, wishing him a peaceful tenure and long life.

=== Key highlights ===
==== Horse-riding ====
Different horse-riding families are led by the Balogun. Descendants of Ijebu war heroes are regarded as the Balogun. Some horse-riding families includes; Balogun Odunuga, Balogun Bello Odueyungbo Kuku, Balogun Agboola Alausa, Balogun Alatishe, Balogun Otubu, Balogun Adesoye, Balogun Odejayi, Balogun Adesoye Onasanya, Balogun Towobola, Balogun Aregbesola and Balogun Ajibike Odedina. Intermittent gunshot are used to announce their entry, which sends many people into a frenzy.

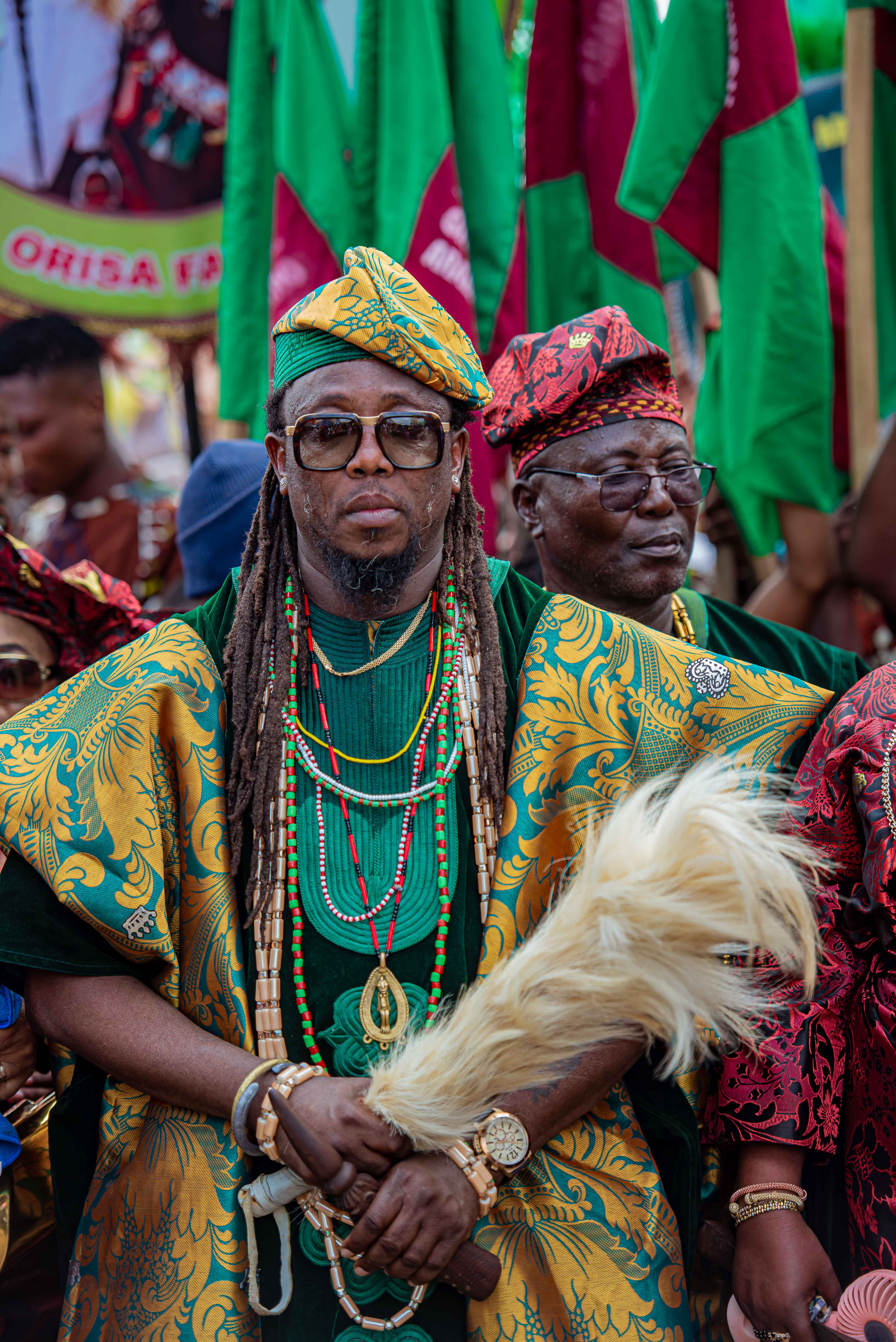

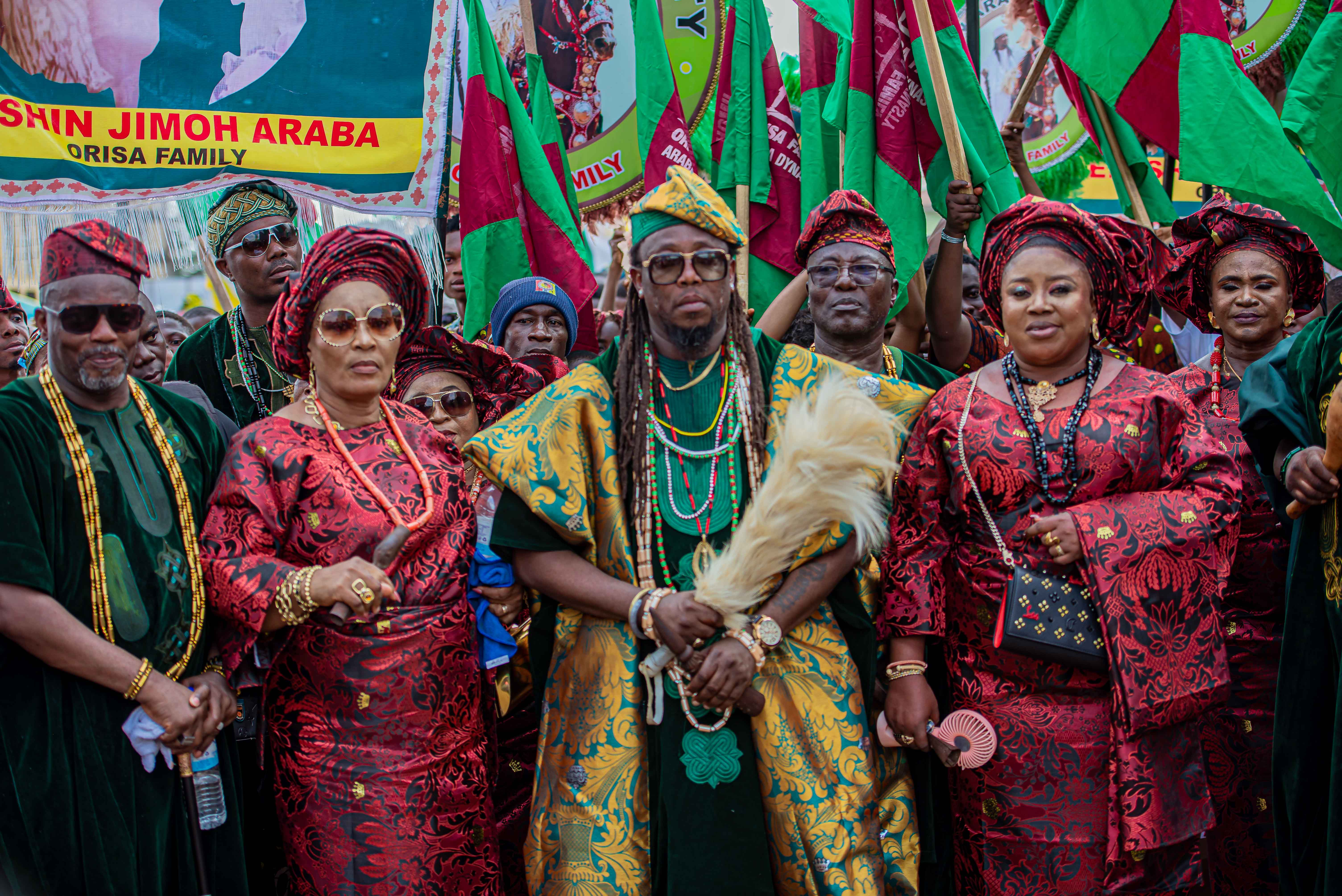

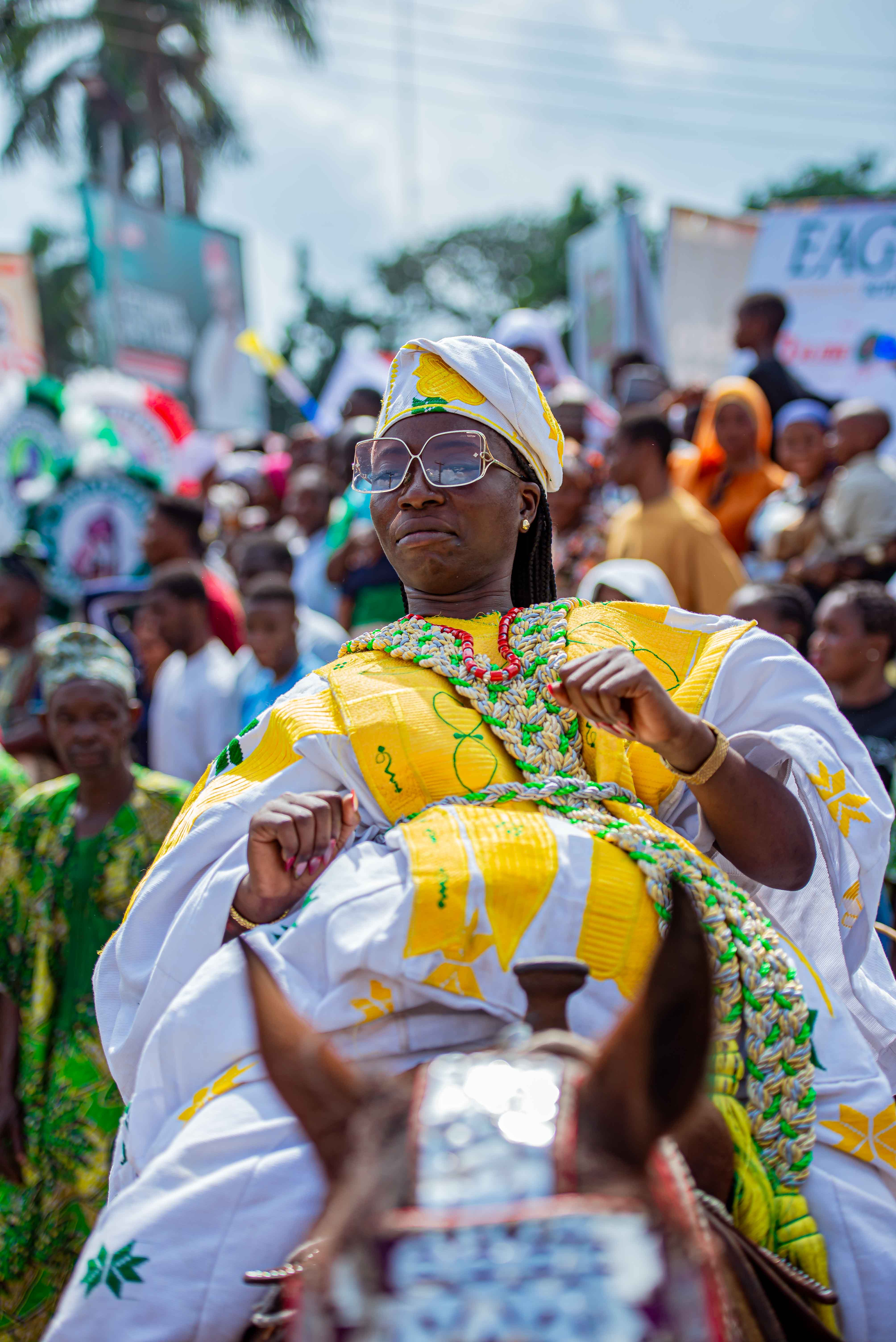

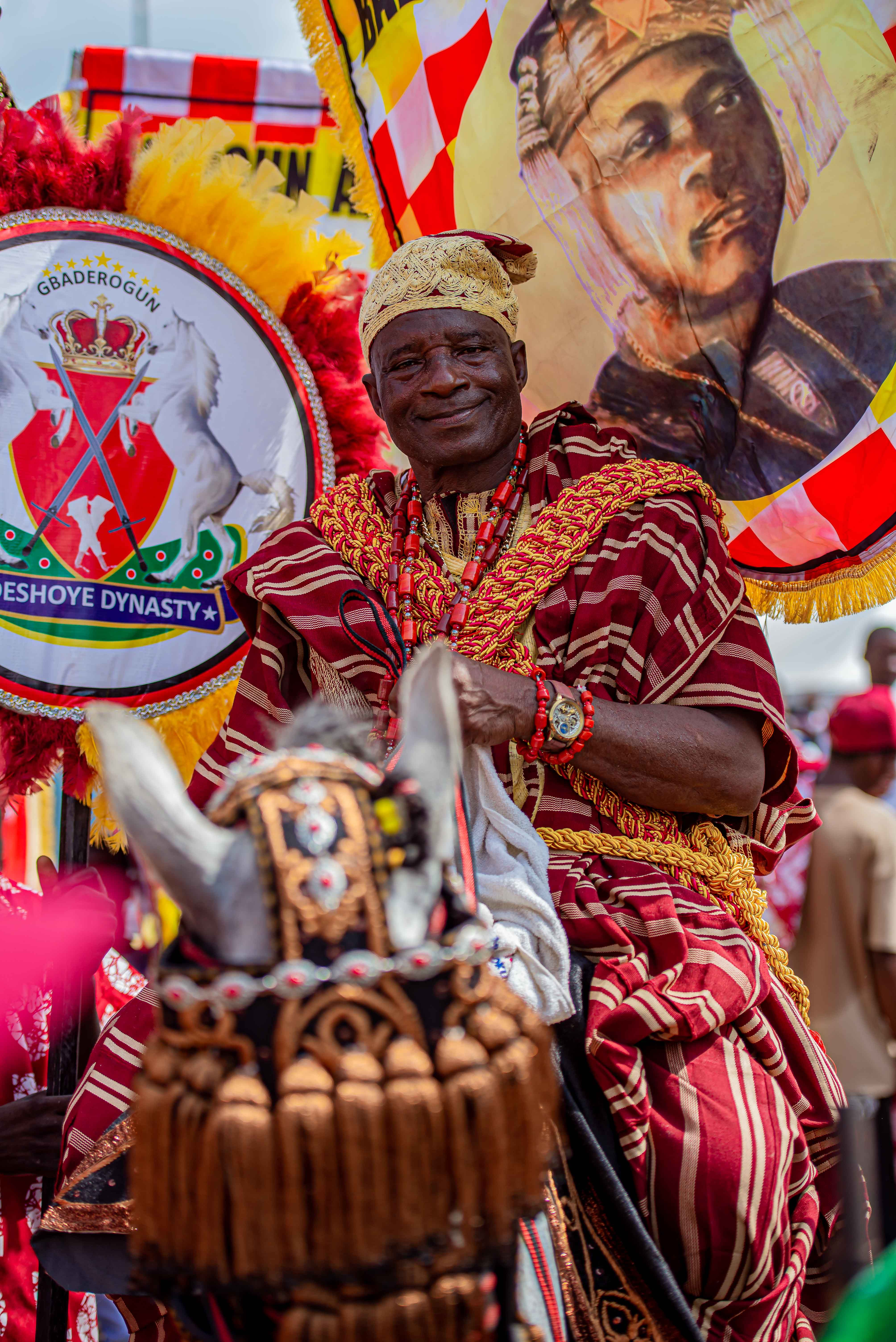

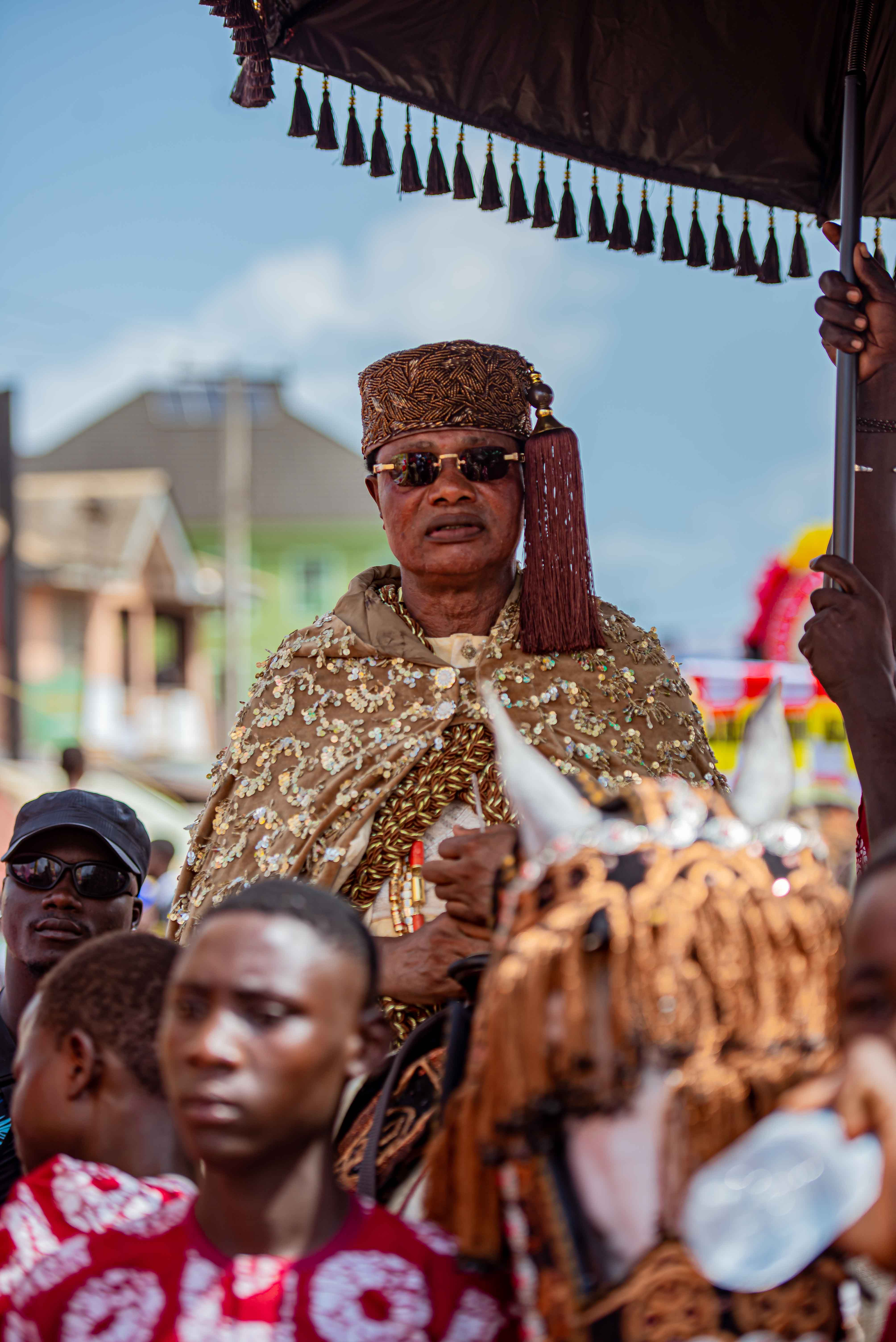

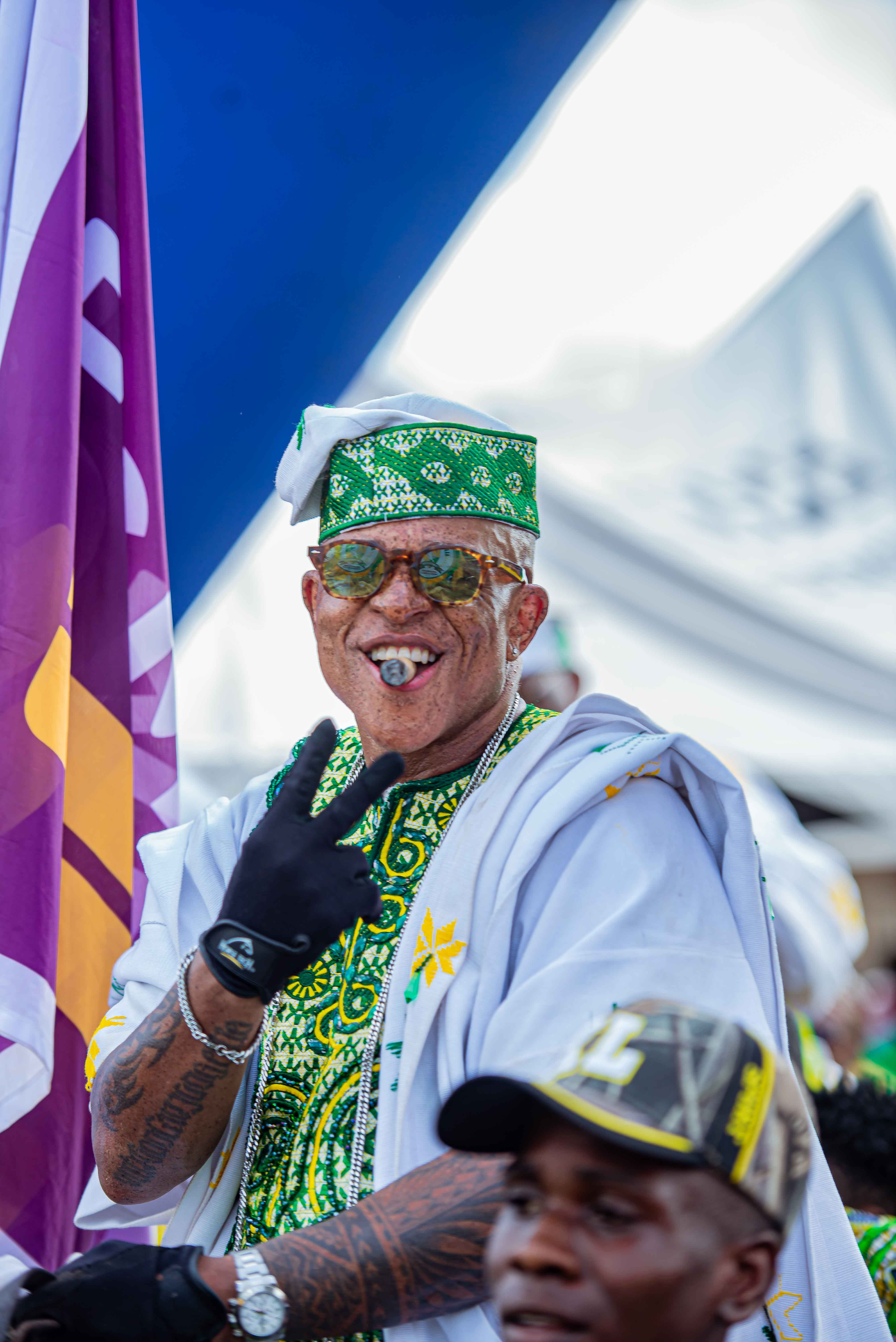

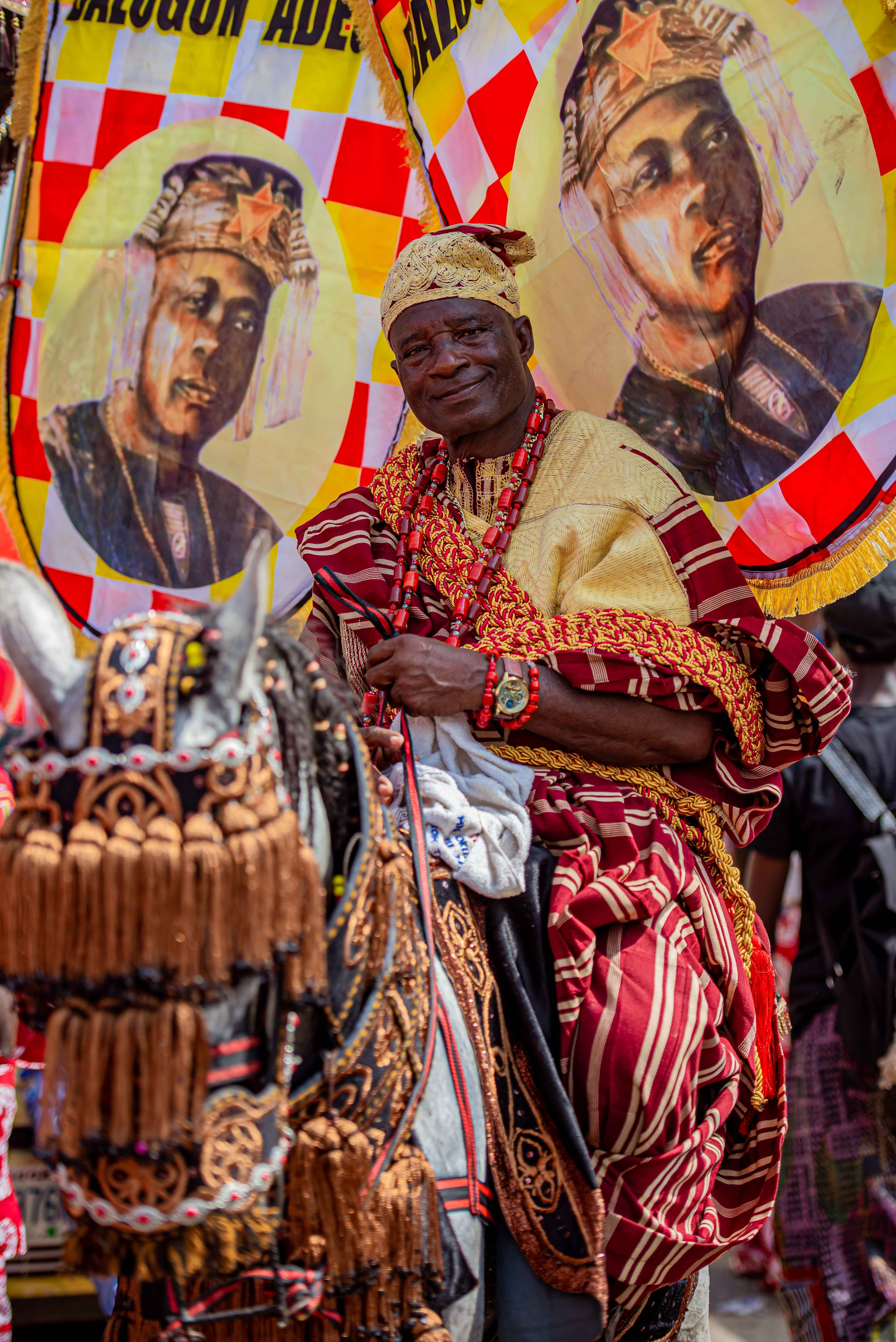

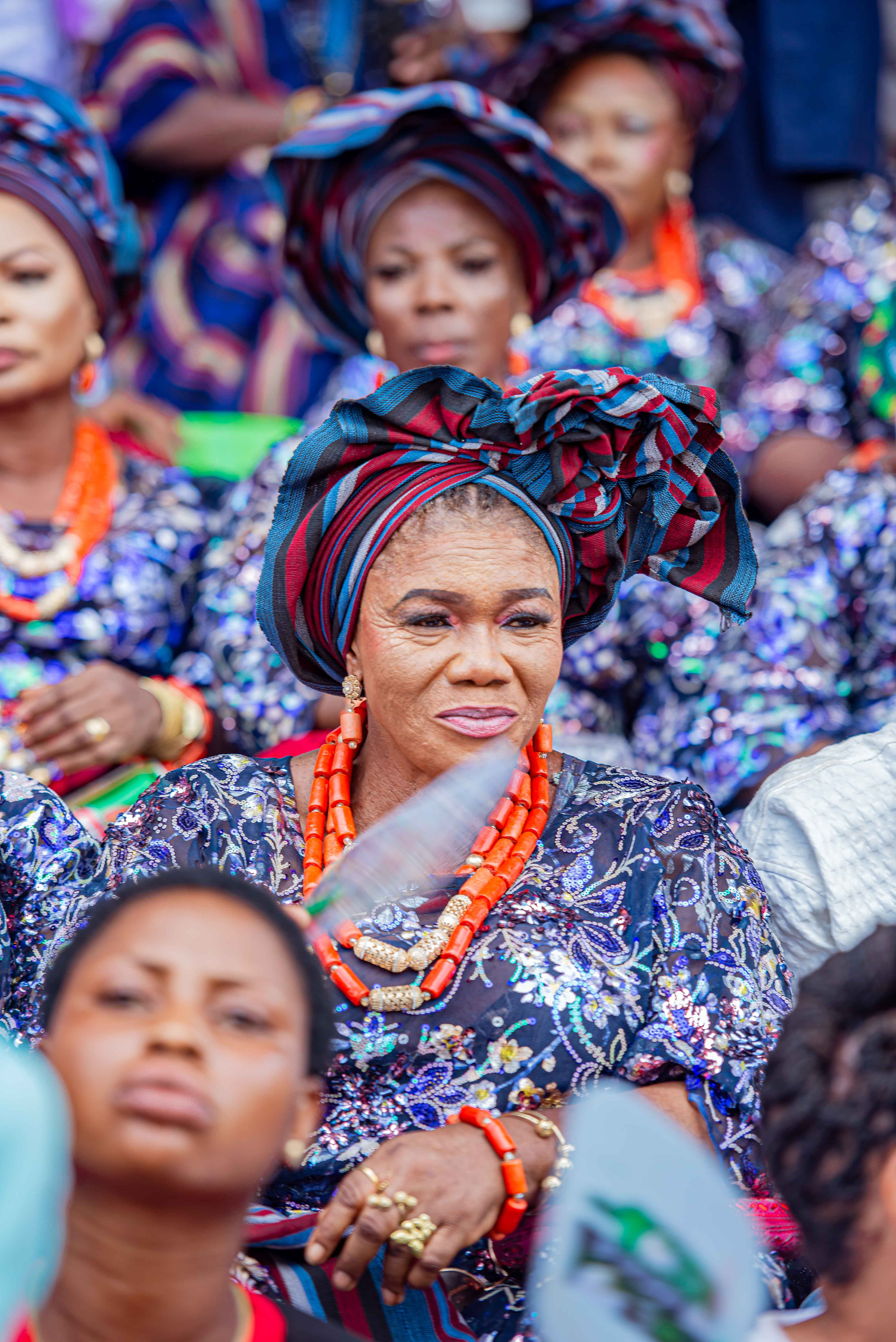

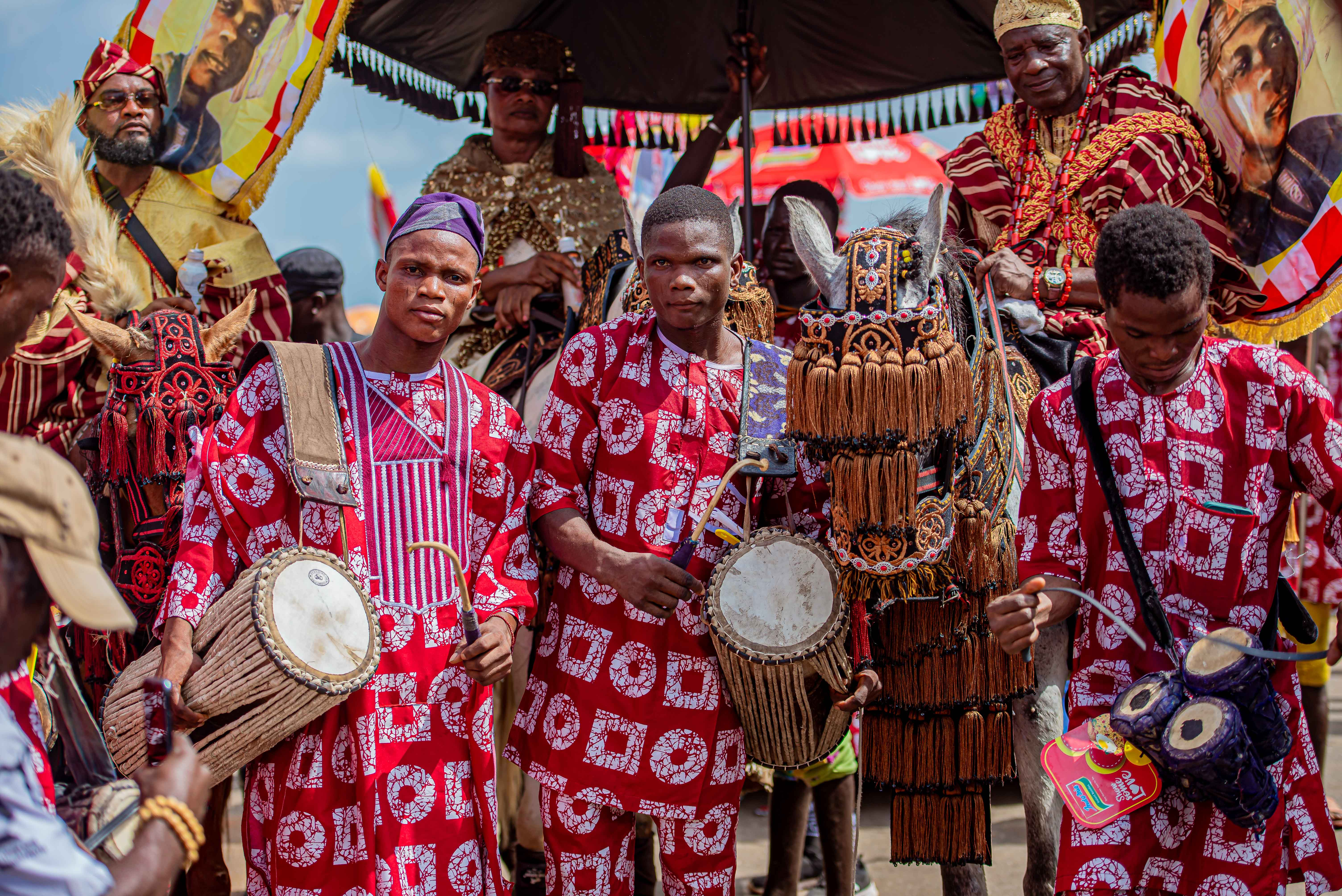

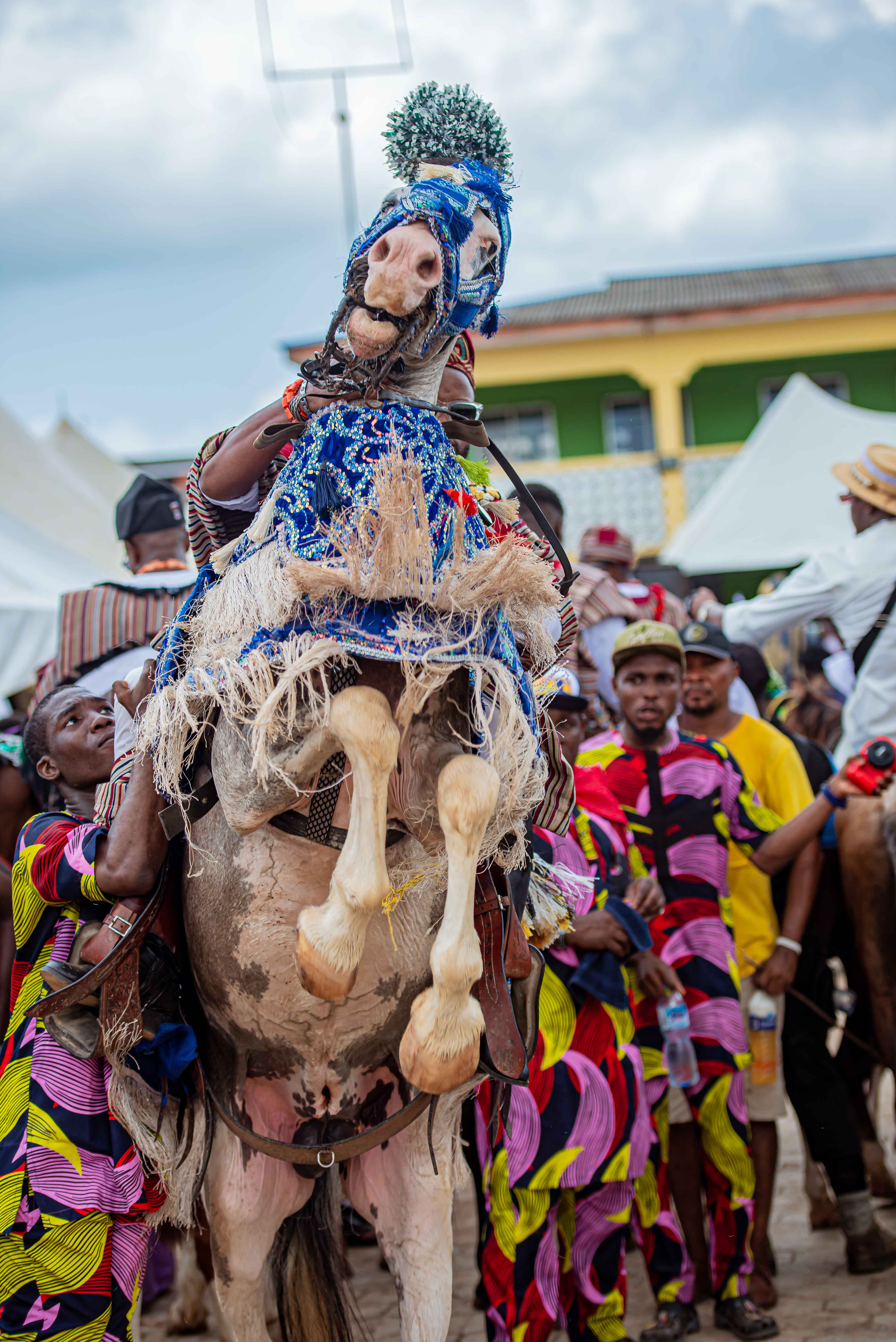

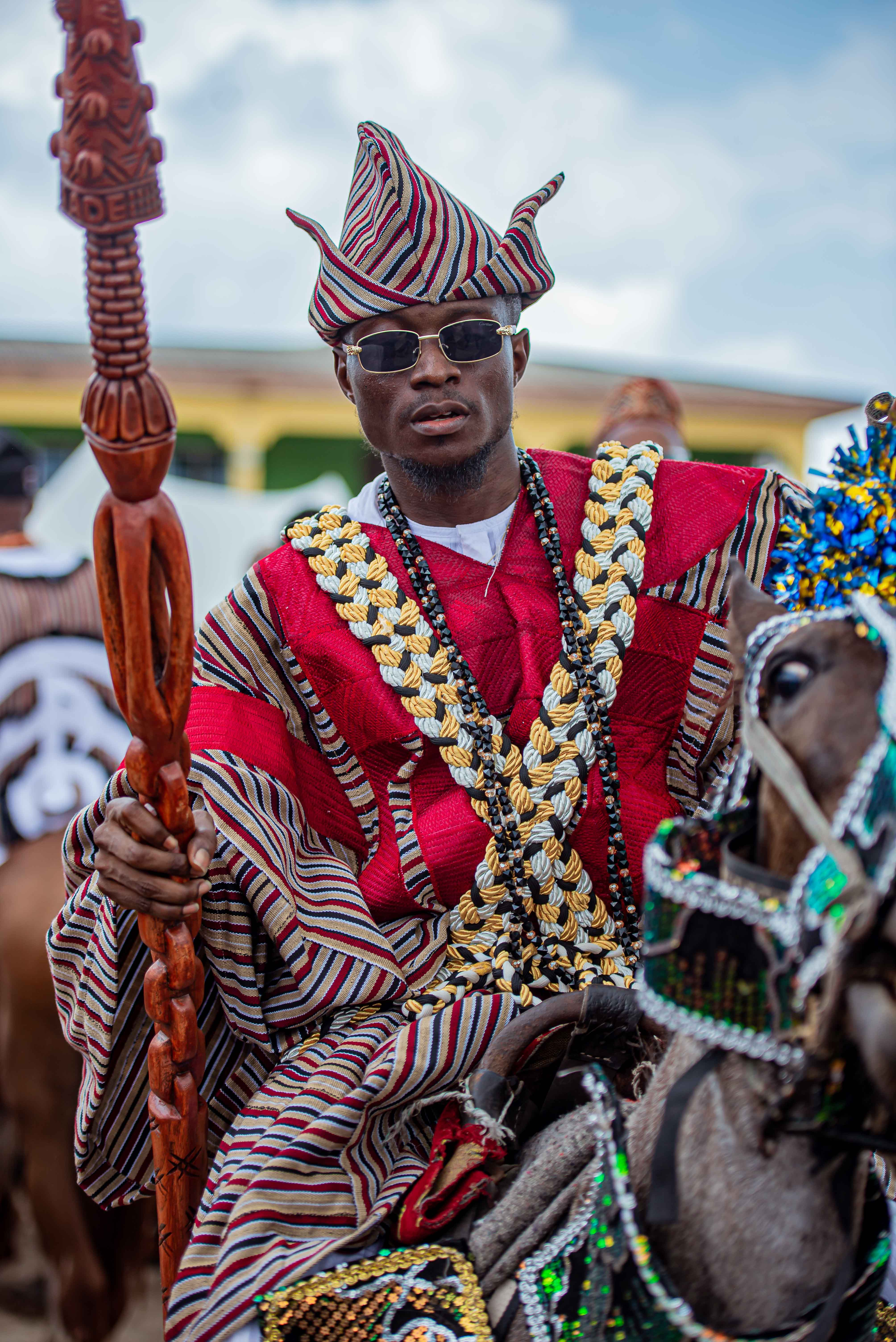

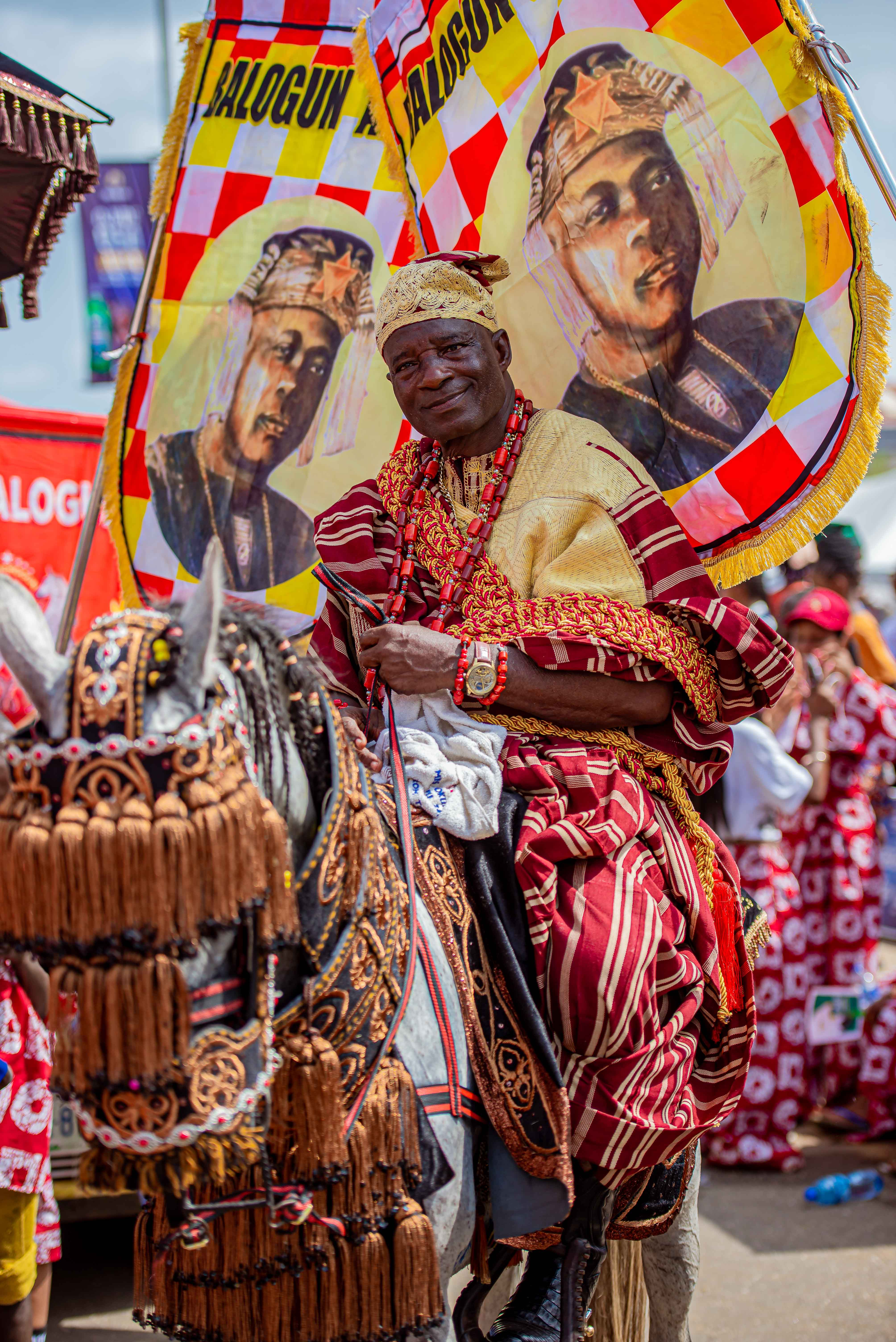

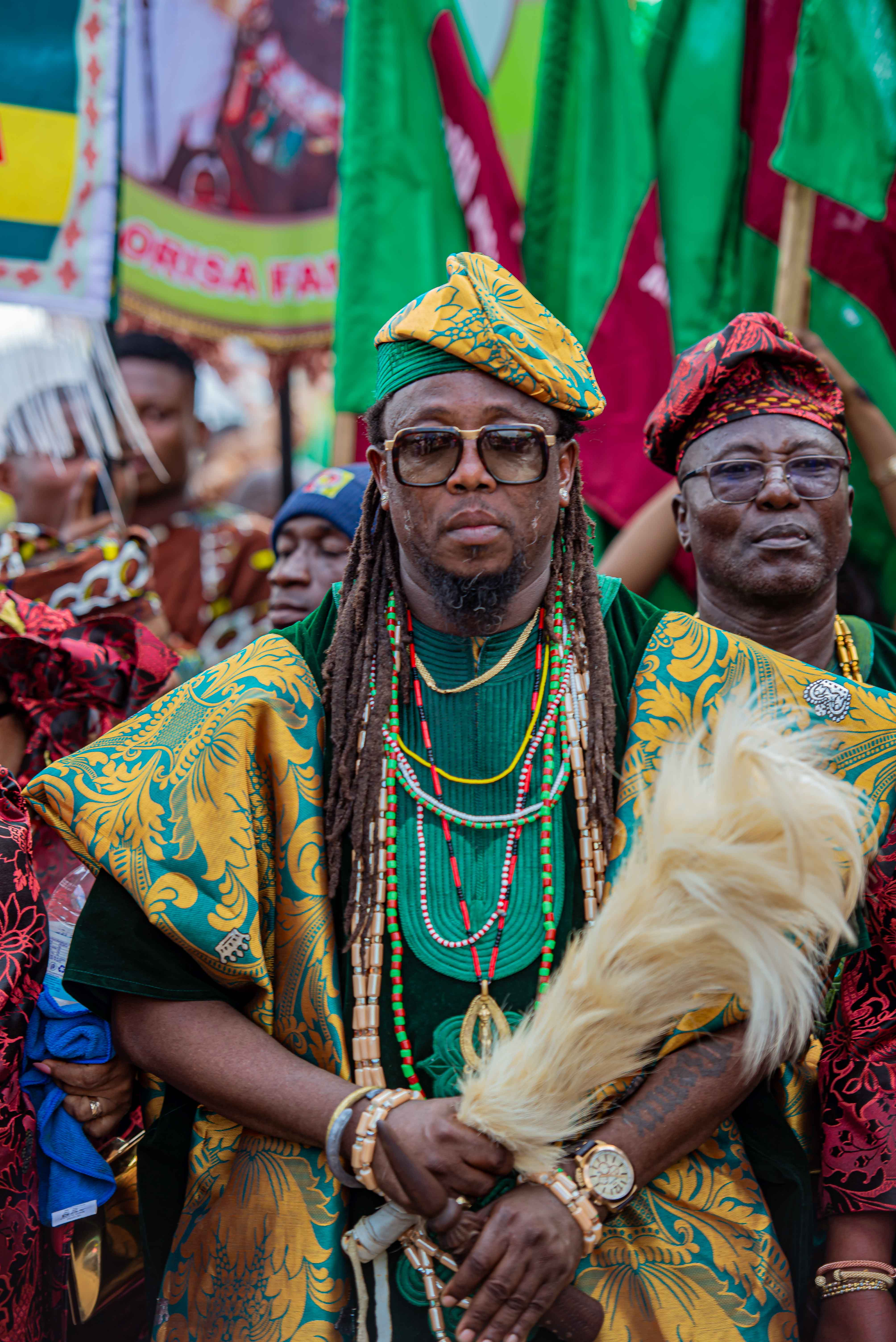

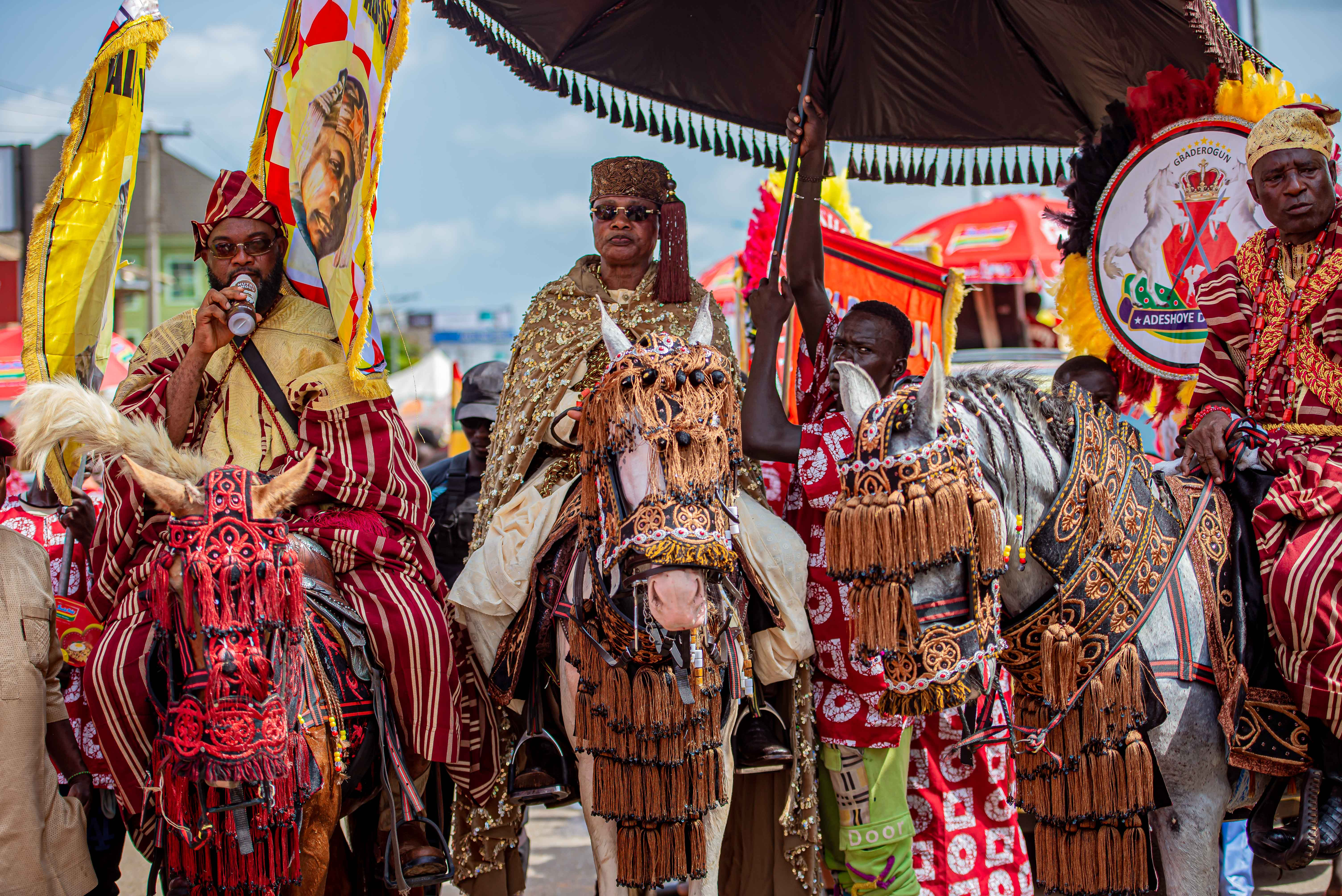

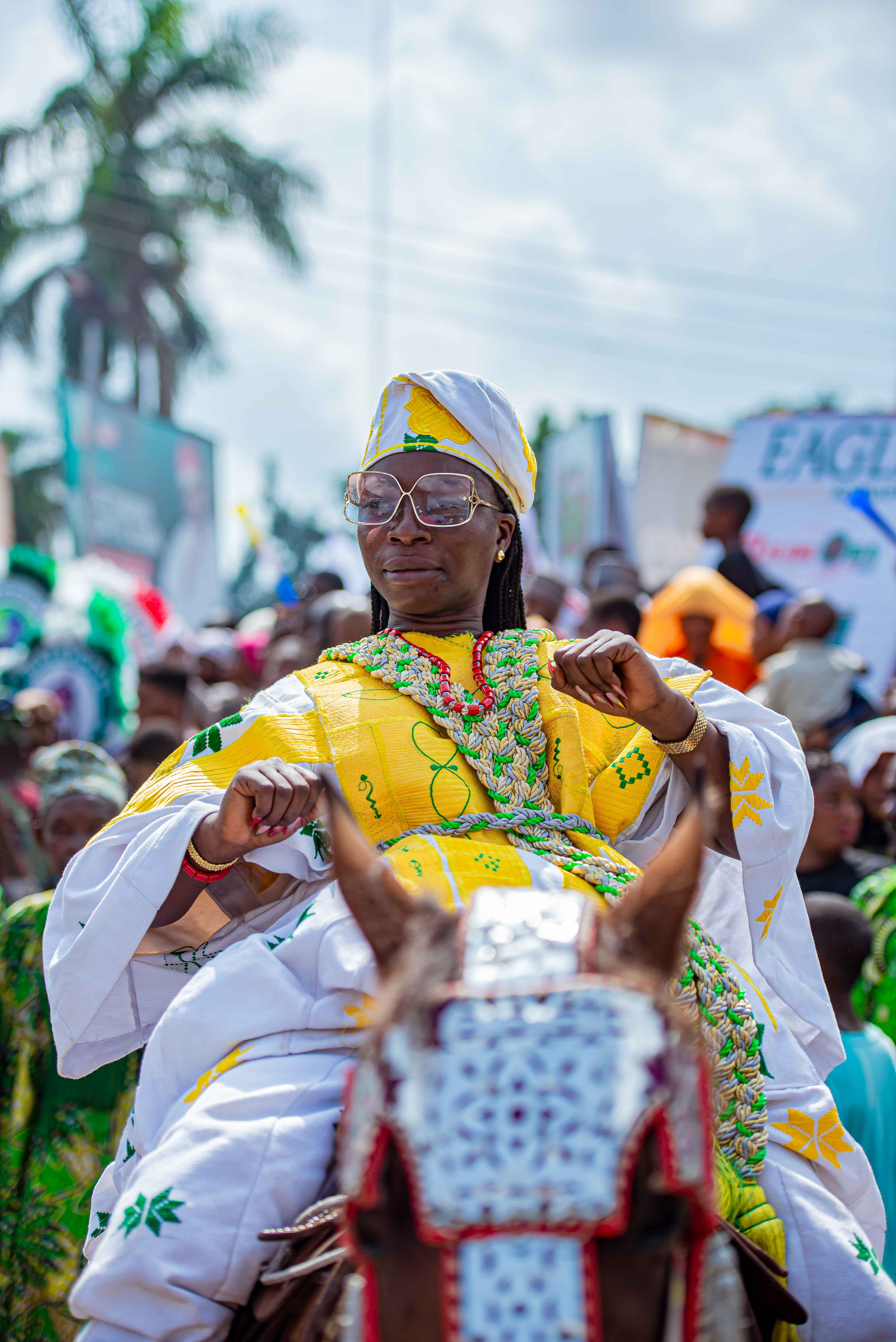

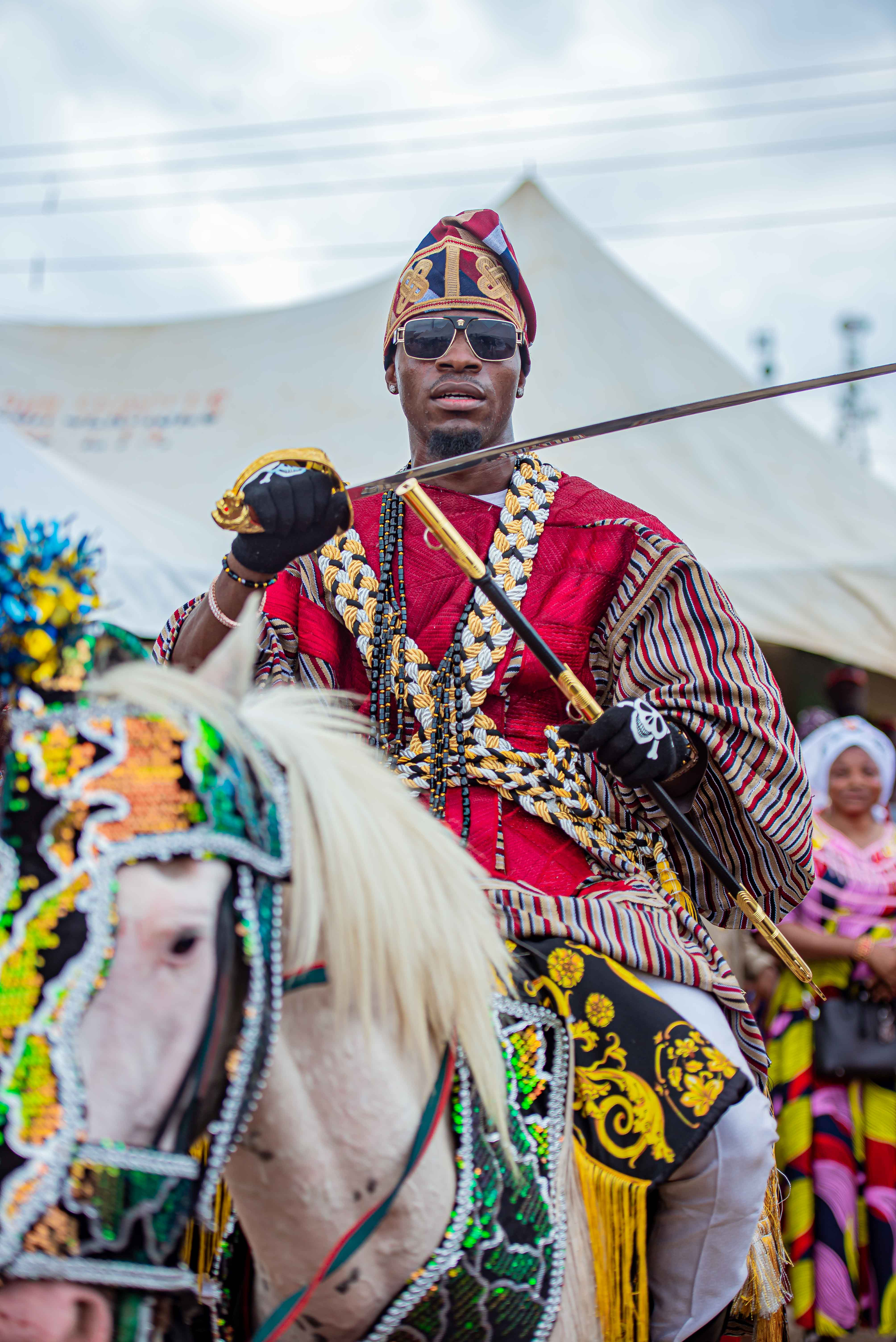

==== Artistic beauty of the Ojude Oba Festival ====
One of the reasons why people from entirely different cultural backgrounds have an interest in the Ojude oba festival is because Art plays a very significant role in the festival, with the style and manner of dressing of the different age groups, the music and musical instrument, even to the design on the horses of the Balogun families, and more.

==== Dressing ====
Age grades compete for the best dressed. Hence, the reason why group go all out for the season's most expensive clothing. Attires from a previous festival cannot be worn again at a new Ojude Oba festival, they wear entirely different attires year to year which makes a statement on the economic status and wealth of the age group and how well they are doing. Arguably, nowhere else is the Yoruba flair for traditional attire better demonstrated than in the flamboyance at Ojude Oba. Traditionally, the favourite dress colours of the Yoruba people include; tan, the rich natural tone of the silk known as sanyan, and blue, ranging from the palest to the deepest blue black obtainable from the indigo dye pots.

== Sponsors and supporters ==
The Ojude Oba festival is sponsored and supported by the incumbent Awujale, the people of Ijebu-Ode, individuals and some major corporate organizations in Nigeria. One of the major sponsors of the festival is Globacom. The telecommunication giant has been a sponsor of the event for up to 10 years, year after year, providing gifts, prizes and trophies to branded chairs and sundry benefits. Their help in the upliftment of the Ojude oba festival is immeasurable. Other sponsor of the festival are First City Monument Bank (FCMB), UAC of Nigeria, Fan Milk, The Seven-Up Bottling Company and MultiChoice and so many more.
