= Nigerian Chieftaincy =

Nobility of Nigeria

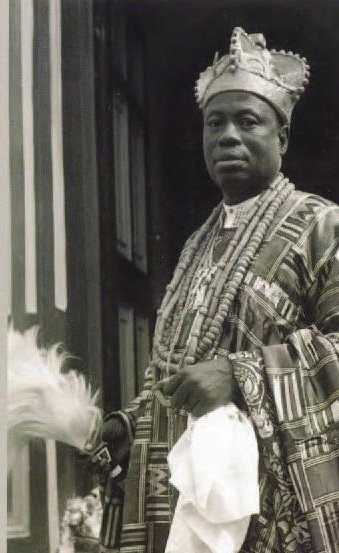
Oba Sir Adeniji Adele II, the 18th Eleko of Lagos.

The Nigerian Chieftaincy is the chieftaincy system that is native to Nigeria. Consisting of everything from the country's monarchs to its titled family elders, the chieftaincy as a whole is one of the oldest continuously existing institutions in Nigeria and is legally recognized by its government.

== History ==
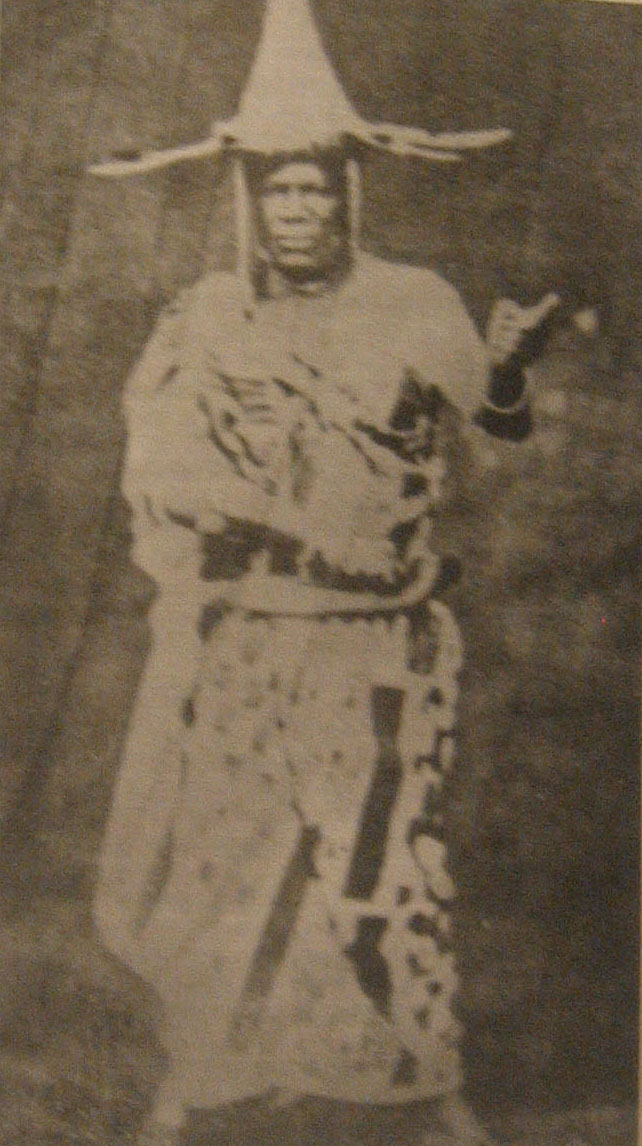
King Jaja I, the 1st Amanyanaboh of Opobo.

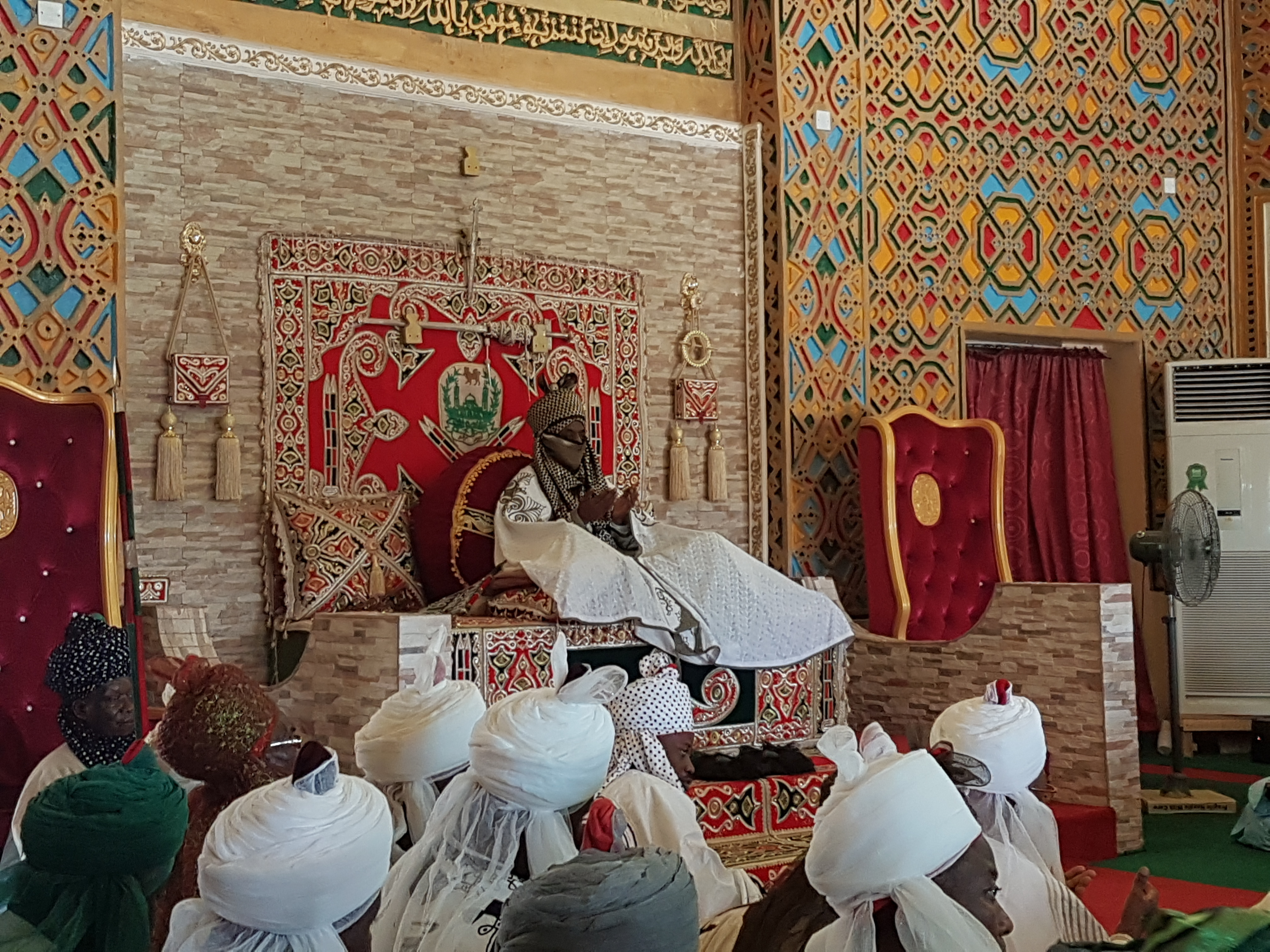
Alhaji Muhammadu Sanusi II, the 14th and 16th Emir of Kano.

Prince Jaja Wachuku, the Ugo of Ngwaland.

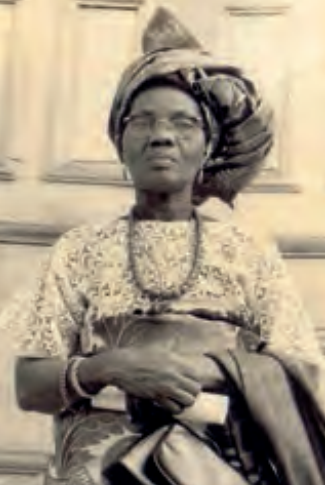
Chief Funmilayo Ransome-Kuti, an Oloye of the Western House of Chiefs.

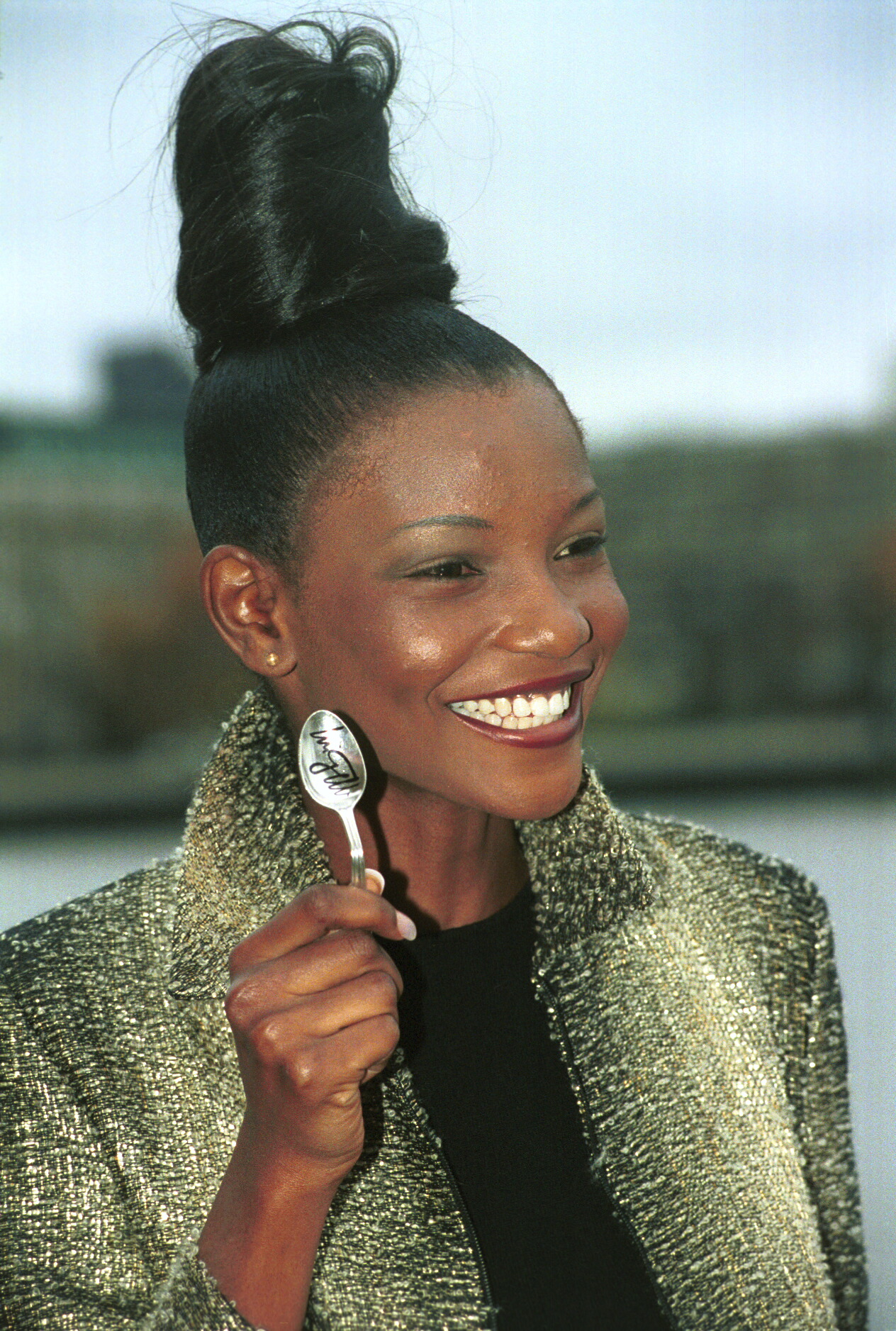
Chief Agbani Darego, an Oloye of Lagos.

Nigerian pre-colonial states tended to be organized as city-states. The empires that did exist, like the Kanem-Borno empire, the Oyo empire, the Benin empire and the Sokoto caliphate, were essentially coalitions of these individual city-states. Due to this, a great deal of local power was concentrated in the hands of rulers that remained almost permanently in their capitals. These rulers had sacred functions - a number of them were even considered to be sacred themselves - and therefore often lived in seclusion as a result. Their nobles, both hereditary and otherwise, typically also had functions that were tied to the religious traditions of the kingdoms that they served.

In the South, the nobles ruled the states on a day-to-day basis on behalf of their monarchs by way of a series of initiatory secret societies. These bodies combined the aforementioned priestly functions with judicial ones, and also traditionally provided advisers to the monarchs in question. Some of these societies, like Ogboni and Nze na Ozo, have survived to the present day as aristocratic social clubs within their respective tribes. Meanwhile, in the North, the emirates of the old caliphate were usually divided into districts, and these districts were in turn ruled by nobles known as Hakimi (pl. Hakimai) that were subject to the monarchs.

As a general rule titles did not always pass from father to son; many royal and noble families did however provide a number of titleholders over several generations. In the south, the titles held by nobles were often not the same ones as those that had been held by others in their lineages. Some chiefs had even been untitled slaves, and therefore had had no titled forebears prior to their eventual ascension to the ranks of the aristocracy.

Although dominated by the titled men mentioned above, several kingdoms also had parallel traditions of exclusively-female title societies that operated in partnership with their male counterparts. Others would reserve specially created titles, such as the Yoruba Iyalode, for their womenfolk.

During the early European forays into Africa, Nigerian chiefs - both monarchs and nobles - came to be divided into two opposing camps: the anti-European chiefs on the one end (who wanted nothing to do with the Europeans and wanted them to leave, by war if necessary) and the pro-European chiefs (who favoured maintaining friendly relations with the Europeans, even if it meant sacrificing certain amounts of political power).

At the point of the increase in British influence in Nigeria during the 19th century, the anti-European chiefs used a variety of tactics to work against foreign influence, utilizing both direct and indirect forms. The colonial government responded by favouring the pro-European chiefs and supporting more amenable claimants to the Nigerian titles in an attempt to frustrate the anti-European chiefs. Minor wars were fought with the anti-European chiefs, while pro-European chiefs prospered through trade with Britain and so were politically safe as a result. During the Scramble for Africa, anti-European chiefs were slowly replaced with pro-European ones, and Colonial Nigeria came to be governed by a system known as indirect rule, which involved native chiefs becoming part of the administrative structure to ease administrative costs. Through this method, the colonial government was able to avoid any rebellions against its authority.

Following Nigeria's independence in 1960, each federated unit of the country had a House of Chiefs, which was part of its lawmaking system. These houses have since been replaced by the largely ceremonial Councils of Traditional Rulers. In addition, many of the founding fathers and mothers of the First Republic - including the leading troika of Chief Nnamdi Azikiwe, Chief Obafemi Awolowo and Alhaji Sir Ahmadu Bello - were all royals or nobles in the Nigerian chieftaincy system. This has continued to operate since their time as a locally controlled honours system alongside its nationally controlled counterpart, which is itself within the gift of the Federal Government.

== Today ==
Chief Antonio Deinde Fernandez, the Apesin Ola of Egbaland, his wife Chief Aduke, the Erelu Apesin of Egbaland, their daughters Atinuke and Abimbola, and family friend Nelson Mandela.

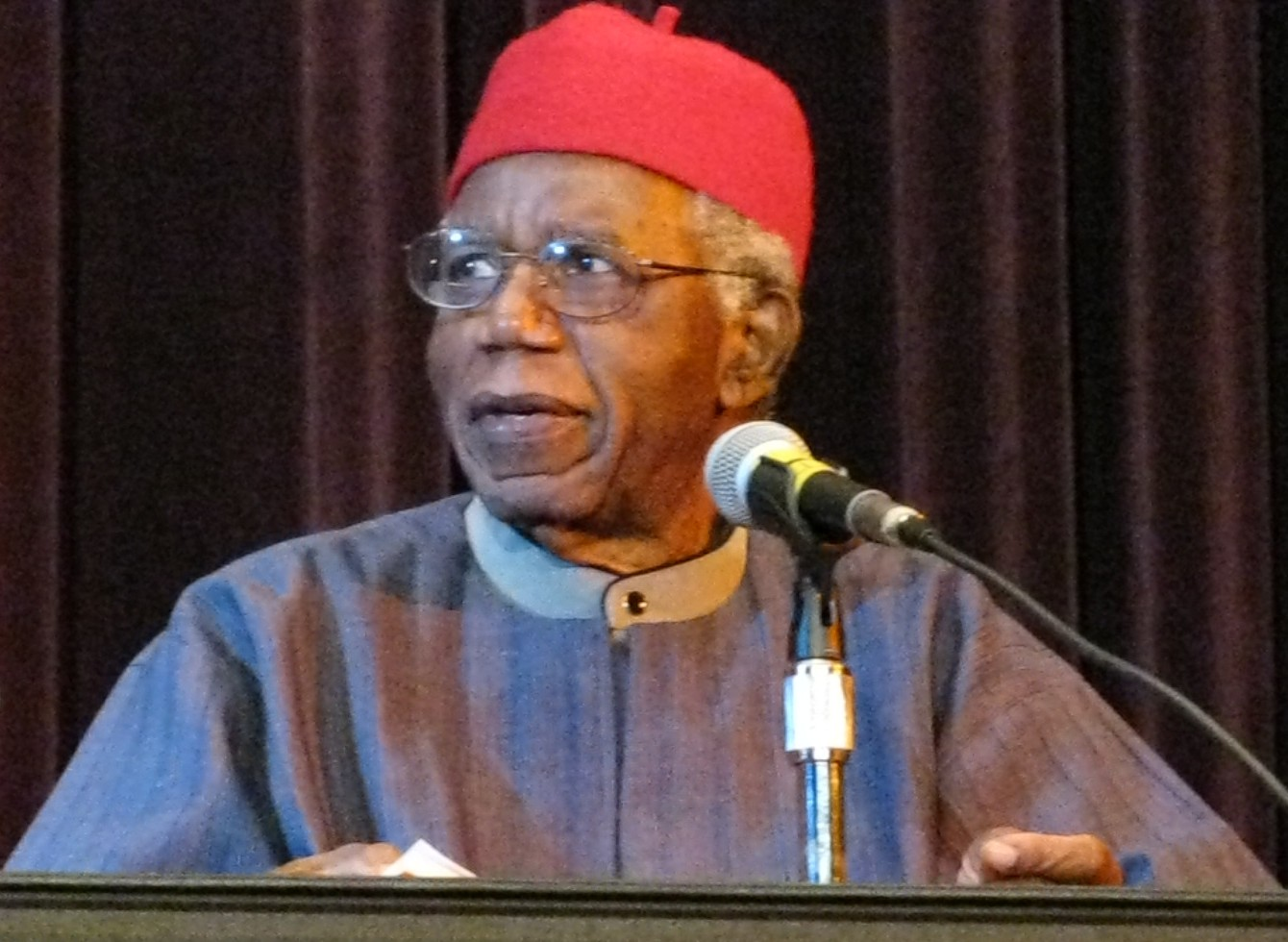
Chief Chinua Achebe, the Ugonabo of Ogidi, speaking at Asbury Hall, Buffalo, New York, in 2008.

Today, many prominent Nigerians aspire to the holding of a title. Both Chief Olusegun Obasanjo and Alhaji Umaru Musa Yar'Adua, one-time presidents of Nigeria, have belonged to the noble stratum of the Nigerian chieftaincy. Nigerian traditional rulers and their titled subordinates currently derive their powers from various Chiefs' Laws, which are official parts of the body of contemporary Nigerian laws. As a result, the highly ranked amongst them typically receive staffs of office - and by way of them official recognition - from the governors of the states of the Federation as the culminations of their coronation and investiture rites. Thus installed, they then have the power to install inferior chiefs themselves.

Chieftaincy titles are often of differing grades, and are usually ranked according to a variety of diverse factors. Whether or not they are recognized by the government, whether they are traditionally powerful or purely honorary, what the relative positions of the title societies that they belong to (if any) are in the royal orders of precedence, their relative antiquity, how expensive they are to acquire, whether or not they are hereditary, and a number of other such customary determinants are commonly used to ascribe hierarchical positions. A number of kingdoms also make use of colour-coded regalia to denote either allegiance to particular title societies or individual rank within them. Examples of this phenomenon include the Red-Capped Chiefs of Igboland and the White-Capped Chiefs of Lagos, each the highest ranked group of noble chiefs in its respective sub-system.

=== Diaspora chieftaincy ===
The modern chieftaincy system often includes diaspora chieftaincy — the establishment of a traditional leader role to represent migrant minority communities within a traditional state. Diaspora chieftaincy is a relatively recent development within the chieftaincy system, emerging in the second half of the 20th century; these diaspora chiefs serve as traditional authorities for non-indigene ethnic groups in the traditional states covering major cities, often acting as intermediaries between their communities and the local political system.

Diaspora chieftaincy originates from migrant hometown associations that sought formal representation within host communities. For example, in the Kano Emirate, the Oba of the local Yoruba community was appointed in 1974 as the first diaspora chief, followed by the Eze Igbo in 1988. Additionally, diaspora chiefs can be appointed for non-indigenous Nigerian groups, seen in the Kano Emirate appointment of the Wakilin Yan China for the Chinese community in the city in 2019. Diaspora chiefs are typically selected based on their status within the minority community, often wealthy business figures or influential leaders in hometown associations. Unlike hereditary traditional rulers, they do not necessarily come from royal lineages but gain legitimacy through community endorsement and recognition by local authorities. The role typically includes organizing cultural events, advocating for the interests of their communities, and negotiating access to public resources.

The rise of diaspora chieftaincy has been met with both support and criticism. Proponents argue the appointments provide non-indigene communities with a voice in local governance by increasing the likelihood of their inclusion in decision-making processes. However, scholars have debated whether diaspora chiefs genuinely empower their communities or merely reinforce their status as second-class citizens. Opponents contend that by operating within the traditional governance framework, diaspora chiefs can unintentionally legitimize the exclusion of their communities from full political participation. Despite these debates, diaspora chieftaincy continues to expand, with similar structures emerging among Nigerian immigrant communities abroad.

== Nigerian titleholders ==
=== Monarchs ===
==== Pre-colonial ====
- Nigerian sovereigns
  - Lamido
  - Oba
  - Eze

==== Colonial ====
- Native Authorities

==== Post-colonial ====
- Nigerian traditional rulers
  - Lamido
    - Sultan of Sokoto
    - Emir of Kano
    - Etsu Nupe
  - Oba
    - Ooni of Ife
    - Alaafin of Oyo
    - Awujale of Ijebu
  - Eze
    - Eze Nri
    - Obi of Onitsha
    - Igwe of Nnewi

=== Other Chiefs ===
- Waziri
- Hakimi
- Eso Ikoyi
- Ogboni
- Nze na Ozo
- Ichie

== See also ==
- Social class in Nigeria
- Nigerian heraldry
- Nigerian traditional rulers
- Nigerian traditional states
