= Houses of Chiefs (Nigeria) =

Legislative body of Nigeria

House of Chiefs
- Nigeria

Type
- Type: Upper chamber of the Regional legislatures of Nigeria

History
- Established: 1951
- Disbanded: 1966
- Succeeded by: Abolished

Meeting place
- Varies by region

The House of Chiefs was a legislative body within the federal and regional structures of Nigeria, established to provide traditional rulers and chiefs a formal role in governance during the colonial and post-colonial periods. It functioned as the upper chamber in the bicameral legislative system in some regions of Nigeria before its abolition following constitutional reforms.

== History ==
=== Origins ===
Chieftaincy in Nigeria predates colonial rule, evolving from priestly roles overseeing agriculture and fertility into rulers of mini-states and later mega-states from 1400–1800. Chiefs historically performed religious, judicial, and administrative roles. During colonial rule, the British system of indirect rule co-opted traditional rulers into native authorities, recognizing friendly chiefs while deposing those seen as threats.

=== Establishment ===
The Houses of Chiefs was first formally established under the 1951 Macpherson Constitution, which sought to increase Nigerian participation in governance while incorporating the country’s traditional institutions into the political framework. Houses of Chiefs were set up in each of the three regions:

- Northern Region
- Western Region
- Eastern Region (later replaced by a Council of Chiefs)

In May 1956, a bill introduced into the Eastern Region House of Assembly aimed to increase official recognition of chiefs, paving the way for potential establishment of a regional House of Chiefs despite prior nationalist resistance to the inclusion of chiefs in governance. They were modelled domestically after the Senate of Nigeria, and internationally after the British House of Lords. These bodies served primarily as advisory chambers, with the power to review bills passed by the lower houses of the regional legislatures. The chiefs could delay legislation but did not possess an absolute veto power. The House of Chiefs served to:

- Review and advise on legislation passed by the lower house.
- Provide a platform for traditional authorities to express concerns related to governance.
- Maintain a connection between traditional structures and the modern political system.

Following Nigeria's independence in 1960, the Houses of Chiefs continued under the new constitution of the Federation of Nigeria.

== Abolition and legacy ==
The Houses of Chiefs ceased functioning after the 1966 military coup that saw the end of the First Nigerian Republic. It was further decided in 1976, with the creation of new states, that such a chamber would be reductant. Be this as it may, traditional councils at the state level and the National Council of Traditional Rulers of Nigeria continue to serve as advisory bodies, preserving the link between traditional rulers and the government in a consultative capacity.

== Composition and membership ==
The composition of the Houses of Chiefs varied by region:

- In the Northern Region, membership included emirs, chiefs, and representatives from native authorities.
- In the Western Region, the Ooni of Ife, the Alaafin of Oyo, and other prominent Yoruba rulers were members.
- In the Eastern Region, membership included traditional rulers across Igbo-speaking regions.

Members were not elected by the populace but appointed by virtue of their traditional offices or selected by native authorities. Membership was easily defined in these regions due to the recognized emirate and chieftaincy systems.

== See also ==
- State Council of Traditional Rulers and Chiefs
- Houses of assembly of Nigerian states
