= State Council of Traditional Rulers and Chiefs =

A state council of traditional rulers and chiefs, also known as a state council of obas in Yoruba language-majority states, refers to any Nigerian state government run body of traditional rulers and chiefs. It is usually headed by a ranking traditional ruler, although the sitting governor of the state retains the right to approve or veto any binding measure taken by the body. State councils, however, are often courted by candidates for state or national offices or by sitting incumbents, usually for the purpose of endorsement.

State councils are typically governed by laws issued by their state. Thus Abia State has a formal process for recognizing traditional rulers of each autonomous community and for selecting from these the members of the Council of Chiefs. The council has limited powers, and is subject to state government control. In November 2000, the Chairman of the Enugu State Traditional Rulers Council celebrated the silver jubilee anniversary of his accession to his throne. Three days later the state government dissolved the traditional rulers' council and a month later withdrew his certificate of recognition as a traditional ruler.

== See also ==
- Nigerian chieftaincy
- Nigerian traditional rulers
