= Federated Women's Institutes of Ontario =

- Abbreviation: FWIO
- Formation: February 19, 1897
- Founder: Adelaide Hunter Hoodless Janet Lee Erland Lee
- Founded at: Stoney Creek, Ontario Canada
- Legal status: active
- Purpose: education, advocacy, history preservation
- Headquarters: Stoney Creek, Ontario, Canada
- Location: 180 branches
- Region served: Ontario
- Members: 1,600 members
- President: Michelle Phillippi
- Affiliations: Federated Women's Institutes of Canada, Associated Country Women of the World
- Website: fwio.on.ca

The Federated Women's Institutes of Ontario (FWIO) is a not-for-profit charitable organization with affiliations around the world, working with and for women in Ontario.

== History ==
The FWIO was organized on February 6, 1919, when it became apparent there was a need for the coordination of the work of the Branch Institutes. The FWIO was incorporated under The Agricultural Associations Act by an order-in-Council of the Government of Ontario, dated May 11, 1921. Through the provincial organization, the Women's Institutes of Ontario are able to speak with authority as one voice.

== Origin and growth of women's institutes in Ontario ==
In 1897, Adelaide Hoodless was invited by Erland Lee to speak at a Farmers' Institute Ladies Night in Stoney Creek, Ontario where she suggested the formation of an organization for rural women. The next week, on February 19, 1897, the first formal organization of a Women's Institute took place in Saltfleet Township. The original Branch is now known as the Stoney Creek Charter Women's Institute, by Ontario Regulation 352/78.

== Organizational structure ==
The Branch is the basic building block from which the Women's Institute has grown since its inception in 1897. In Ontario, Members belong to a network that connects Branches to Districts and Areas, as well as to the provincial (FWIO), national (Federated Women’s Institutes of Canada) and international (Associated Country Women of the World) levels of the organization.

== See also ==
- British Women's Institute
- Women's rights in Canada
- Erland Lee Museum
