= Janet (Chisholm) Lee =

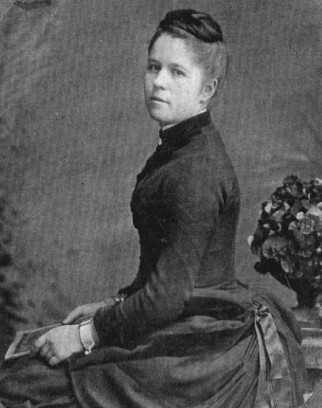
Janet Lee

Janet Robertson (Chisholm) Lee (1862–1940) was an important figure in the Niagara Region of Canada, best known for her role in the formation of the Women's Institutes in 1897, and for pioneering the Kindergarten program in Hamilton, Ontario.

== Life ==
Lee was born into the Chisholm family from Woodstock, Canada West. She was educated at the Hamilton Normal School, where she earned her teaching certificate and created the first Kindergarten program in the city. In 1890 she married Erland Lee, a farmer, government employee, and teacher from Stoney Creek, Ontario. They had 5 children, Gordon, Alice, Hilda, Frank, and Marjorie.

Janet, her husband Erland Lee, and Adelaide Hoodless are considered the co-founders of the first Women's Institute, presently a worldwide organization originally formed to promote the education of isolated rural women. The group is internationally known as the Associated Country Women of the World. Janet Lee is attributed with writing the original Women's Institute constitution on her dining room table, on February 25, 1897.

A primary school in Stoney Creek, Ontario was named for Janet Lee in 1987. The Lee family home, known as "Edgemont," was converted into the Erland Lee Museum in 1972.
