= The Great British Sewing Bee series 3 =

The Great British Sewing Bee
- Series 3
- No. of episodes: 6

Release
- Original network: BBC Two
- Original release: 5 February – 12 March 2015

Series chronology
- ← Previous; Series 2 Next → Series 4

The third series of The Great British Sewing Bee began on 5 February 2015 and aired for 6 episodes. Claudia Winkleman returned to present alongside resident judges May Martin and Patrick Grant. The series was filmed at Metropolitan Wharf in London.

== Sewers ==
Sewer	Age	Occupation	Hometown
Alex Florea	32	Corporate Sustainability Manager	London / Romania
Amanda Gledhill	46	Deputy Head Teacher	Darlington
Annie Shanks	62	Former Dairy Farmer & Cheese Maker	Scottish Borders
Deborah Simms	26	Support Officer	Levenshulme, Manchester
Lorna Monje†	69	Retired Air Hostess	Kent
Matt Chapple	37	IT Consultant	Berkshire
Neela Mistry-Bradshaw	41	Marketing Manager	Surrey
Neil Stace	46	Lieutenant Colonel	Salisbury
Paul Clarke	54	Sports Physiotherapist	Cheshire
Ryan Walklett	21	Theatre Dresser / University Student	London

== Results and elimination ==
Colour key
Sewer got through to the next round
Sewer was eliminated
Sewer won best Garment of the week
Sewer was the series runner-up
Sewer was the series winner

Sewer	1	2	3	4	5	6
Matt						Winner
Lorna			BG			Runner-up
Neil	BG			BG	BG	Runner-up
Deborah					OUT	
Paul		BG			OUT	
Ryan				OUT		
Amanda				OUT		
Neela			OUT			
Alex		OUT				
Annie	OUT					

== Episodes ==
Sewer eliminated Best Garment Winner

=== Episode 1 ===
Sewer	Pattern Challenge (Women's Cotton Trousers)	Alteration Challenge (Denim Shirt)		Made-to-measure (Summer Dress)
Alex	10	Pink Tulle and Denim Skirt	1	60s Dress
Amanda	7	Child's Dress	3	Picnic Dress
Annie	4	Sleeved Dress	10	Classic Tea Dress
Deborah	5	Pencil Skirt	6	Fit & Flare Dress
Lorna	2	Child's Skirt	2	Long-Sleeved Princess-Seamed Dress
Matt	6	Skirt	5	Sleeveless Dress
Neela	3	Skirt	9	Princess-Seamed Dress
Neil	1	Skirt	8	Princess-Seamed Dress
Paul	9	Dress	4	A-Line Dress
Ryan	8	Dress	7	50s Tea Dress

=== Episode 2: Attention to Detail Week: Children's Clothes ===
Sewer	Pattern Challenge (Tailored Child's Waistcoat)	Alteration Challenge (T-shirt & Dress)		Made-to-measure (Children's 3D Costume)
Alex	6	Harem Trousers	4	Cupcake Dress
Amanda	8	Cape	9	Flapper Dress
Deborah	7	Cardigan/Belero Jacket	5	Peacock Dress
Lorna	2	Swimming Suit	2	Booby Bird
Matt	5	Pair of Shorts	8	Peacock Dress
Neela	9	Asymmetric Dress	7	Bookworm
Neil	3	Boxing Shorts & Gloves	1	Smartphone
Paul	4	Shirred Waisted Skirt	6	Ballerina Elephant
Ryan	1	Shirred Dress	3	Urban Fox

=== Episode 3: 1950s Week ===
Sewer	Pattern Challenge (The Walk-away Dress)	Alteration Challenge (Vintage Curtains)		Made-to-measure (Sheer Blouse)
Amanda	8	Prom Skirt	3	Pussy Bow Blouse
Deborah	7	Panelled Wrap Skirt	6	Semi-Fitted Bow Blouse
Lorna	5	Skirt with Big Bow	1	Sweetheart Blouse
Matt	2	Girl's Dress	5	Sleeveless Fitted Blouse
Neela	6	Top	8	Collared Blouse
Neil	3	Ladies Evening Dress	2	Draped Blouse
Paul	4	Skirt	7	Semi-Fitted Blouse
Ryan	1	Man's Short-Sleeve Shirt	4	Sleeveless Fitted Peplum Blouse

=== Episode 4: Structure Week ===
Sewer	Pattern Challenge (Boned Corset)	Alteration Challenge (Power Suit)		Made-to-measure (Traditional Kilt)
Amanda	7	Draped Top	7	Linton Tweed Female Kilt
Deborah	4	Jacket	5	Wool Traditional Kilt
Lorna	5	Maternity Top	4	Traditional Kilt (in a Gunn Ancient Tartan)
Matt	2	Dress	3	Cotton Female Kilt
Neil	1	Cocktail Dress	1	Traditional Kilt (in a Culloden Tartan)
Paul	3	Dress	6	Glittered Denim Kilt
Ryan	6	All-in-one Dress	2	Contemporary Kilt

=== Episode 5 – Semifinal: Tricky Fabrics ===
Sewer	Pattern Challenge (Lace Pencil Skirt)	Alteration Challenge (Neoprene Wetsuit)		Made-to-measure (Woman's Leather Jacket)
Deborah	3	Dress	1	Collarless Jacket
Lorna	2	Dress	2	Cropped Jacket
Matt	1	Lace Skirt Dress	4	Fitted Biker Jacket
Neil	4	Halter Neck Dress	3	Asymmetrical jacket
Paul	5	Dress	5	Fitted Jacket

=== Episode 6: Final ===
Sewer	Pattern Challenge (Japanese Pattern)	Alteration Challenge (Delphos Column Dress)		Made-to-measure (Avant-garde Dress)
Lorna	2	'Lampshade' Dress	1	Fitted Strapless Minidress with Long Overskirt
Matt	3	Halter Neck Dress	2	Couture-inspired Geometric Dress
Neil	1	'Skanklet'	3	Asymmetric Gown

Runner-up Lorna died of aplastic anaemia in early 2016. The first episode of series four was dedicated to her memory.

== Ratings ==
Episode no.	Airdate	Total viewers (millions)	BBC Two weekly ranking
1	5 February 2015	2.96	4
2	12 February 2015	3.09	4
3	19 February 2015	2.67	5
4	26 February 2015	3.33	4
5	5 March 2015	3.46	3
6	12 March 2015	3.62	2
