= The Great British Sewing Bee series 2 =

The Great British Sewing Bee
- Series 2
- No. of episodes: 8

Release
- Original network: BBC Two
- Original release: 18 February – 8 April 2014

Series chronology
- ← Previous; Series 1 Next → Series 3

The second series of The Great British Sewing Bee started on 18 February and ended after eight episodes on 8 April 2014. Claudia Winkleman returned to present as well as resident judges May Martin and Patrick Grant. The series was filmed at Metropolitan Wharf in London.

== Sewers ==
Sewer	Age	Occupation	Hometown
Cerina Nichamin	50	Cookery teacher/Artist	Hampshire
Chinelo Bally	26	Media Graduate	Essex
Cliff Edwards	71	Retired Prison Chaplain	Bognor Regis
David Dawson	39	Police Officer	Surrey
Heather Jacks	56	Dressage Trainer and Rider	Leicestershire
Jenni Taylor	31	Resource Manager	Walsall
Julie Gromett	51	Housing Estate Officer	West Yorkshire
Lynda Lewis	57	Learning Support Assistant	Caerphilly, Wales
Simon Cantrill	25	Museum Assistant	Bradford
Tamara Melvin	40	Yoga Instructor	Surrey

== Results and elimination ==
Colour key
Sewer got through to the next round
Sewer was eliminated
Sewer won best Garment of the week
Sewer was the series runner-up
Sewer was the series winner
Sewer withdrew

Sewer	1	2	3	4	5	6	7	8
Heather								Winner
Chinelo			BG					Runner-up
Tamara					BG		BG	Runner-up
Lynda		BG		BG		BG	OUT	
David						OUT		
Jenni					OUT			
Cerina				OUT				
Julie	BG		OUT					
Simon		OUT						
Cliff	WDR							

== Episodes ==
Sewer eliminated Best Garment Winner Sewer withdrew from the Sewing bee

=== Episode 1 ===
Sewer	Pattern Challenge (Cotton Sleeve-less Top)	Alteration Challenge (Wool Maxi Skirt)		Made-to-measure (Silk Nightgown)
Cerina	2	Short Skirt with small bottom Frill	6	1930's Style Bias Cut Nightgown
Chinelo	7	Fitted Peplum Skirt	2	Floor Length Nightgown
Cliff	10	Short Skirt with 2 Godets	10	Withdrew
David	8	Short Skirt with 2 Godets	9	Semi-Fitted Empire-Line Nightgown
Heather	1	Short Skirt with back Box Pleat	7	Lingerie Nightgown
Jenni	4	Dungarees	5	1940's Style Floor Length Nightgown
Julie	5	Short Skirt with a Godet and Pocket	8	Bias Cut Nightgown
Lynda	6	Short Skirt with a Godet and Pocket	4	Empire-Line Nightgown
Simon	9	Short Skirt with jetted Pocket and Godet	3	Shot Silk Dupion Nightdress
Tamara	3	Short Skirt with Gathered Ruffle	1	Empire-Line Babydoll Nightgown

Cliff became ill and left the show, so no sewer was eliminated by the judges.

=== Episode 2: Pattern Week ===
Sewer	Pattern Challenge (Box Pleated Skirt)	Alteration Challenge (Two Men's Shirts)		Made-to-measure (Men's Pyjamas)
Cerina	3	Little girl's sailor dress	3	Cotton Lawn Pyjamas
Chinelo	4	Button-down Boob Tube	2	Striped Pull-on Pyjamas
David	6	Skirt	7	Brushed Cotton, Checked Pyjamas
Heather	1	Women's Shirt with ruffle frill	8	Striped Pyjamas
Jenni	7	Skirt	5	Classic Pyjamas
Julie	9	Women's Shirt	6	Striped Cotton Pyjamas
Lynda	5	Little girl's dress	4	Candy Striped Pyjamas
Simon	8	Shirt Dress	9	Brushed Cotton, Checked Pyjamas
Tamara	2	Skirt	1	Newsprint Pyjamas

=== Episode 3: Stretch Fabric Week ===
Sewer	Pattern Challenge (Leggings)	Alteration Challenge (Men's T-shirt)		Made-to-measure (Stretch Wrap Dress)
Cerina	3	Child's Dancing Leotard	1	Simple Wrap Dress
Chinelo	5	Asymmetric Maxi Dress	2	Stretch Velvet Dress
David	2	Zip V-neck Top	8	Faux Wrap Dress
Heather	7	Halter Neck Top with Plunge Backline	3	Sleeveless Classic Wrap Dress
Jenni	8	Plated back Top	4	Retro Wrap Dress
Julie	6	Ladies Top with Ruching around the neck	7	Dressing Gown Dress
Lynda	1	Pleated and Darted Dress with Belt	6	Classic Wrap Dress with Set in Sleeves
Tamara	4	Dress	5	Cap Sleeve Lipstick Dress

=== Episode 4: Children's Clothes ===
Sewer	Pattern Challenge (Children s Dungarees)	Alteration Challenge (Sweatshirt, Track Suit Bottoms and Pillowcase)		Made-to-measure (Prom Dress)
Cerina	7	Pirate Suit	1	Shift Dress
Chinelo	3	Princess/Ballerina	7	Big Bow Prom Dress
David	1	Ladybird	5	Satin Prom Dress
Heather	4	Autumnal Flower Fairy meet Princess	6	Shot Silk Prom Dress
Jenni	2	Dinosaur	3	Vintage Inspired Prom Dress
Lynda	6	Queen of Hearts	2	Mini Prom Dress
Tamara	5	Superhero	4	Neoprene Prom Dress

=== Episode 5: Tricky Fabrics Week ===
Sewer	Pattern Challenge (Nylon Anorak)	Alteration Challenge (Blouse with Leather)		Made-to-measure (Velvet Trousers)
Chinelo	4	Leather frill	2	Peplum Trousers
David	3	Wrap front with plunging neckline	6	Chino-style Trousers
Heather	5	Blouse with plunging neckline	5	Classic Slim Fitting Trousers
Jenni	2	Backless Leather top	3	High Waisted Trousers
Lynda	6	Leather side panels with a sweetheart neckline	1	Classic Straight-legged Trousers
Tamara	1	Leather frill collar	4	Capri Pants

=== Episode 6: Vintage Week ===
Sewer	Pattern Challenge (1930s Silk blouse)	Alteration Challenge (Man's suit)		Made-to-measure (Historic/Vintage coat)
Chinelo	2	Pencil Dress	1	1940s Coat
David	5	Halterneck Top	4	1940s Police Coat
Heather	1	Boob Tube	3	1953 Swing Coat
Lynda	4	Pinafore dress	2	1950s Wool Flannel Coat
Tamara	3	Backwards Tuxedo Top	5	1967 Coat

=== Episode 7: Semifinal ===
Sewer	Pattern Challenge (No Pattern Dress)	Alteration Challenge (Adding Sleeves to a Dress)		Made-to-measure (Copy of their own Garment)
Chinelo	3	Tucked Sleeve	1	Party Dress
Heather	2	Gathered Puff Sleeve	2	Shift Dress
Lynda	1	Classic Set-in Sleeve	4	Wrap Dress
Tamara	4	Gathered Puff Sleeve	3	Yoga Outfit

=== Episode 8: Final ===
Sewer	Pattern Challenge (Hand-Sewn Man's Tie)	Alteration Challenge (Wedding Dress to Child's Dress)		Made-to-measure (Couture Gown)
Chinelo	3	Classic Bridesmaid Dress	1	Hourglass Gown
Heather	2	Classic Bridesmaid Dress	2	Horse Chain Gown
Tamara	1	Classic Bridesmaid Dress	3	Slashed Couture Dress

=== Reunion special ===
A reunion special with the series 2 contestants was broadcast in January 2015.

== Ratings ==
Episode no.	Airdate	Total viewers (millions)	BBC Two weekly ranking
1	18 February 2014	3.49	3
2	25 February 2014	3.02	5
3	4 March 2014	3.06	5
4	11 March 2014	3.03	5
5	18 March 2014	3.36	3
6	25 March 2014	3.25	1
7	1 April 2014	3.35	2
8	8 April 2014	3.24	2
