= Erland Lee Museum =

National Historic Site of Canada

Coordinates: 43°12′24″N 79°43′18″W

Erland Lee (Museum) Home
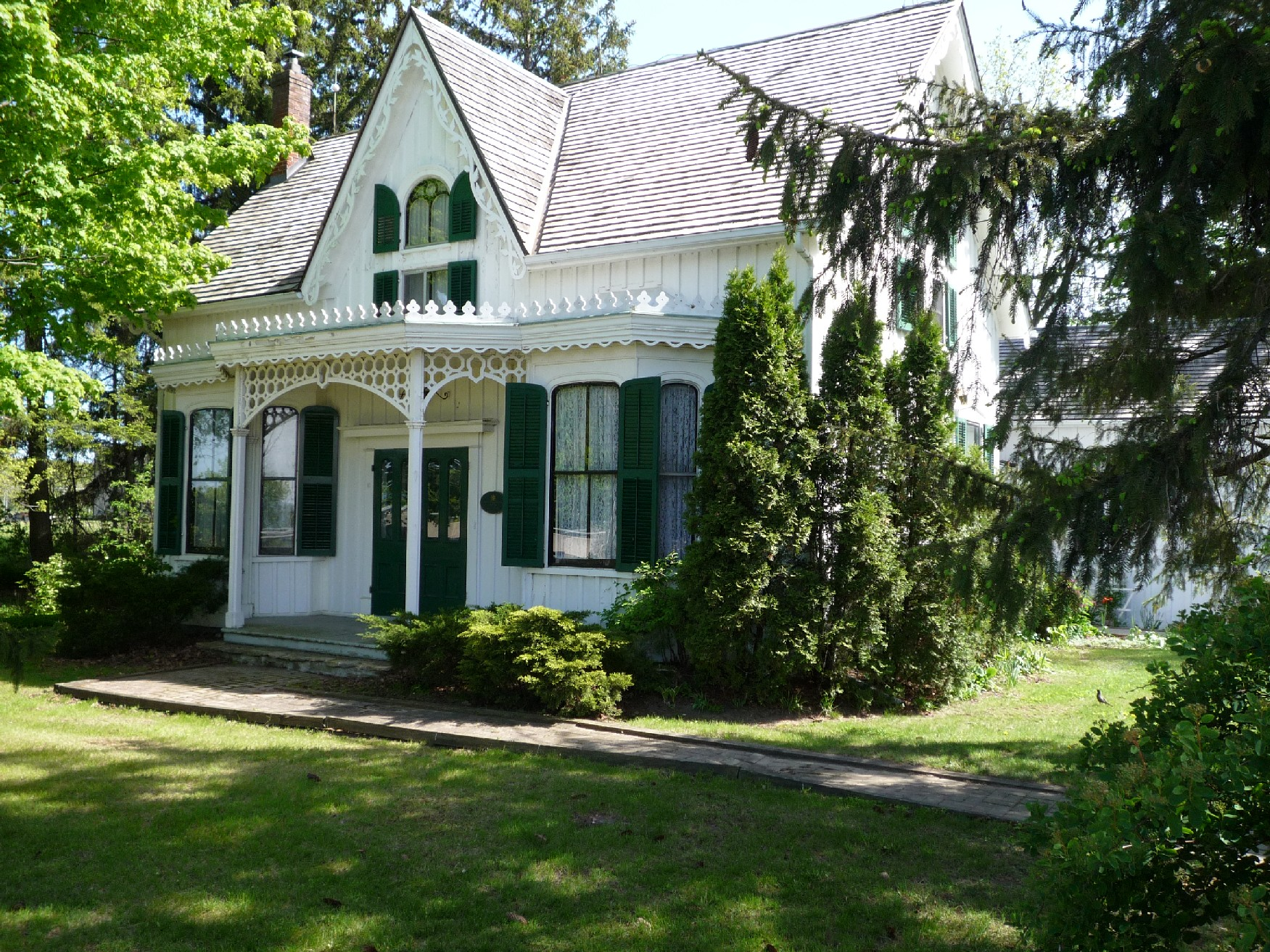
- Established: 1972
- Location: Ridge Road in Stoney Creek, Hamilton, Ontario, Canada.
- Type: Historic Home
- Website: erlandleemuseum.ca

National Historic Site of Canada
- Official name: Erland Lee (Museum) Home
- Designated: 2002

Ontario Heritage Act
- Designated: November 1, 2002

The Erland Lee (Museum) Home is a National Historic Site of Canada located on the ridge of the Niagara Escarpment in Stoney Creek, Hamilton, Ontario. Originally a farmhouse built by John C. Lee (1784-1875) and Mary (Moore) Lee (1789-1852) lived in by Erland and Janet Lee, the museum is recognized as the birthplace of the first Women's Institute, an international organization formed in 1897 to promote the education of isolated rural women.

The oldest part of the home, a log cabin, dates to 1808. An addition was built onto the log cabin in 1873 in the Carpenter Gothic style, part of the Gothic Revival Architectural tradition. This is best exemplified by the steeply pitched gables, gingerbread trim, and the board-and-batten planks.

The Lee Family lived in the house from 1808 until 1970. Its first historical designation was granted in 1961, by the South Wentworth Women’s Institute. In 1972, the home was opened to the public as a museum, and has since been owned and operated by the Federated Women's Institutes of Ontario. In 1995, the museum was designated as a historic home under the Ontario Heritage Act, and on November 1, 2002 the museum was granted status as a National Historic Site of Canada.

The museum closed in December 2010, but reopened 21 April 2013.

The museum itself contains three floors of original Victorian furniture and furnishings, with an emphasis on the history of the Lee family, and the events surrounding the 1897 founding of the Women's Institutes. For example, the dining room table on which Janet Lee wrote the first Women’s Institute constitution still stands in its original location. The farmhouse is complemented by an 1873 carriage house, which contains two floors of local history exhibits.

At the end of July 2024, the museum lost its curator and at the end of August, the summer intern finished their contract. The museum currently has no trained museum staff on site. The site will continue as an events venue and revenue source for the flagging WI movement.

== Images ==
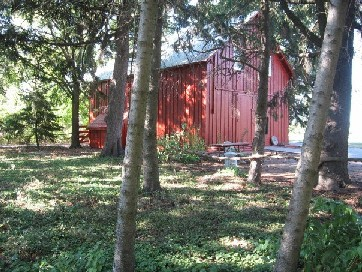
Carriage house

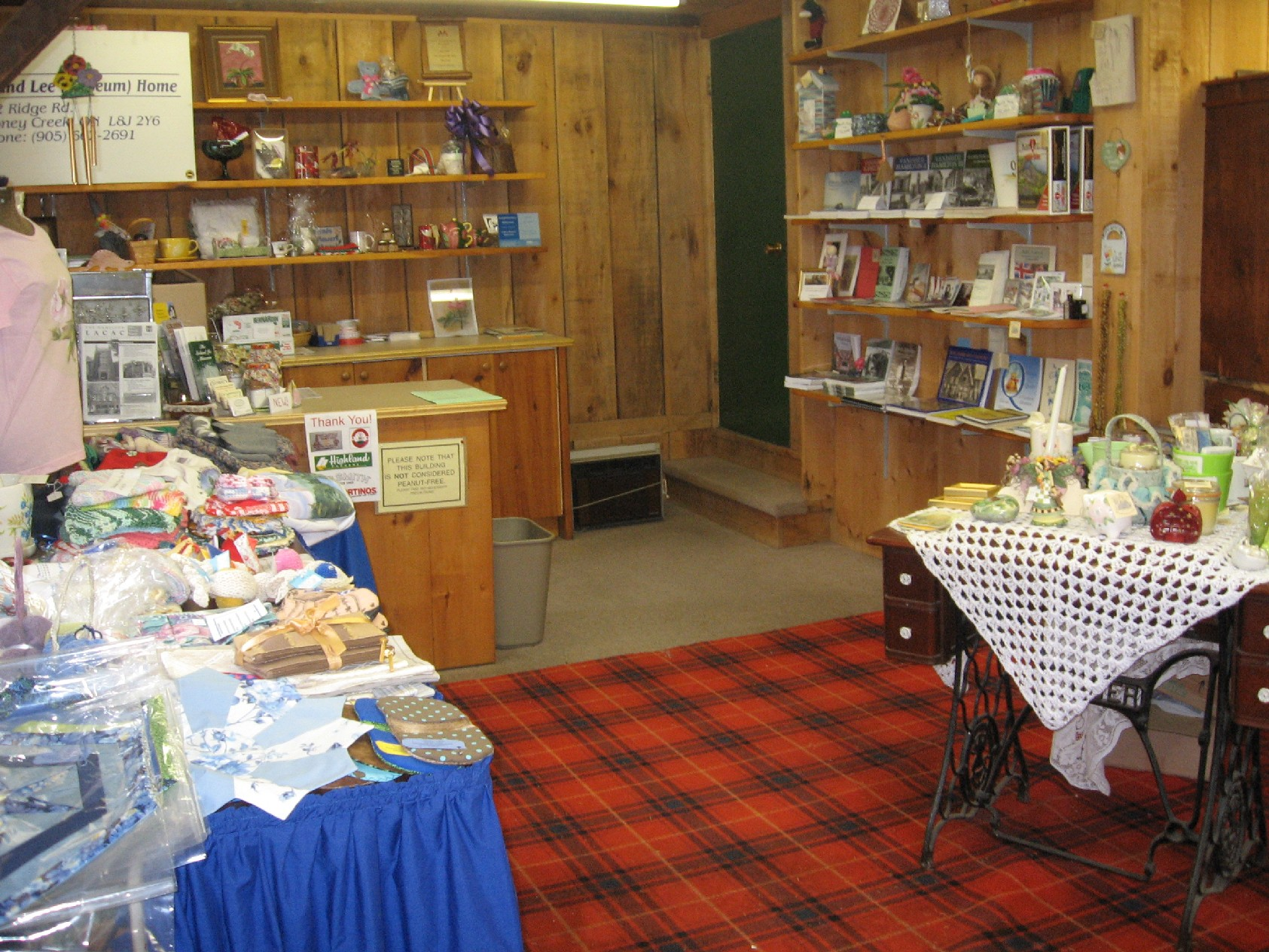
Gift shop

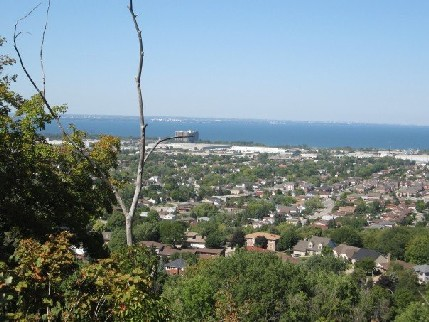
View over Niagara Escarpment from museum

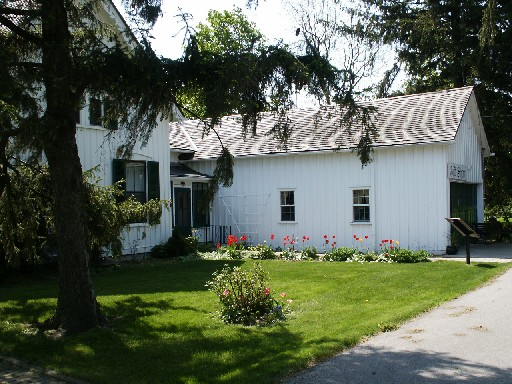
Erland Lee Museum, main building

== See also ==
- Associated Country Women of the World
