= The Great British Sewing Bee series 4 =

The Great British Sewing Bee
- Series 4
- No. of episodes: 8

Release
- Original network: BBC Two
- Original release: 16 May – 4 July 2016

Series chronology
- ← Previous; Series 3 Next → Series 5

The fourth series of The Great British Sewing Bee began on 16 May 2016. Claudia Winkleman returned to present alongside resident judge Patrick Grant, with May Martin being replaced by new judge Esme Young.

== Sewers ==
Sewer	Age	Occupation	Hometown
Angeline Murphy	30	Marketing Manager	County Down
Charlotte Newland	43	Scientific Editor	North London
Duncan Carter	32	Physics and Maths Tutor	London / Scotland
Ghislaine Gazon	43	Office Manager	South London / French Martinique
Jade Earley	18	Swimming Instructor and Student	Sussex
Jamie Kemp	44	Stay-at-home Dad	Exeter
Josh Jamie Barnett	23	Entrepreneurship Engagement Manager	Cardiff
Joyce Bellingham	71	Retired Schools Admissions Officer	West Sussex
Rumana Lasker	27	Junior Doctor	East London
Tracey Symonds	53	Retired Primary School Teacher	Derbyshire

== Results and elimination ==
Colour key
Sewer got through to the next round
One of the judges' favourites
One of the judges' least favourites
Sewer was eliminated
Sewer won Best Garment of the week
Sewer was the series runner-up
Sewer was the series winner

Sewer	1	2	3	4	5	6	7	8
Charlotte			BG				BG	Winner
Jade					BG	BG		Runner Up
Joyce				BG				Runner Up
Tracey							OUT	
Rumana						OUT		
Angeline	BG	BG			OUT			
Josh				OUT				
Jamie			OUT					
Ghislaine		OUT						
Duncan	OUT							

== Episodes ==
Sewer eliminated Best Garment Winner

=== Episode 1: Basic Construction ===
Sewer	Pattern Challenge (Women's Top)	Alteration Challenge (Maternity Dress)		Made-to-measure (Skirt)
Angeline	3	Skirt	4	Peplum pencil skirt
Charlotte	2	Skirt	5	1950s circle skirt
Duncan	8	Skirt	8	Silk petal circle skirt
Ghislaine	7	Skirt	6	Pleated wraparound skirt
Jade	5	Skirt	9	High-waisted tutu skirt
Jamie	1	Draped dress	1	Flounce skirt
Josh	9	Skirt	7	Flared denim skirt
Joyce	6	Godet dress	2	Multi-panelled skirt
Rumana	10	Dress	3	Obi apron maxi skirt
Tracey	4	Tabard	10	Woollen circle skirt

This episode was dedicated to series three runner-up Lorna Monje, who died of aplastic anaemia in early 2016.

=== Episode 2: Children's Week ===
Sewer	Pattern Challenge (Babygrow)	Alteration Challenge (Bridesmaid Dress)		Made-to-measure (Cape)
Angeline	8	Mermaid Dress	8	Tartan Godet Cape
Charlotte	1	Party Dress	6	Tweed Collared Cape
Ghislaine	9	Boxing Outfit	1	Sunday Best Cape
Jade	2	Bridesmaid Dress	7	Fur Trimmed Cape
Jamie	6	Shift Dress	4	Classic Gentleman's Cape
Josh	7	Gilet Jacket	9	Reversible Hooded Cape
Joyce	4	Princess Dress	5	Love-Heart Cape
Rumana	3	Butterfly Dress	2	Satin Lined Cape
Tracey	5	Forest Fairy Dress	3	Butterfly Cape

=== Episode 3: Lingerie Week ===
Sewer	Pattern Challenge (Lace Bra)	Alteration Challenge (Scarves)		Made-to-measure (Dressing Robe)
Angeline	8	Cami Top	3	Vintage Style Satin Robe
Charlotte	2	Babydoll	4	Cotton Lawn Robe
Jade	6	Cami Top	5	Piped Silk Robe
Jamie	4	Lady Boxers	6	Quilted Silk Housecoat
Josh	7	Jumpsuit	8	Satin Housecoat
Joyce	1	Babydoll	2	Lined Robe
Rumana	5	Camisole	7	Lace Kimono
Tracey	3	Camisole	1	Satin and Lace Robe

=== Episode 4: International Week ===
Sewer	Pattern Challenge (Qipao Brocade Top)	Alteration Challenge (Sari)		Made-to-measure (West African Dress)
Angeline	3	Kimono Shirt	4	Choker Minidress
Charlotte	5	Harem Pants	2	Ruffle dress
Jade	6	Harem Pants	7	Waterfall Peplum Dress
Josh	2	Belly Dancer Outfit	5	Contrast Dress
Joyce	7	Harem Pants	6	Capped Sleeve Dress
Rumana	4	Panel Dress	3	Sheath Dress with Cape
Tracey	1	Shirt	1	Knee Length Dress

=== Episode 5: 1960s Week ===
Sewer	Pattern Challenge (Colour Block Shift Dress)	Alteration challenge (PVC Raincoat)		Made-to-measure (Tailored Jacket)
Angeline	4	Cut Out Dress	6	Psychedelic Coat
Charlotte	2	Halter Dress	5	Jackie Kennedy Jacket
Jade	5	Crop Top & Shirt	4	Cropped Jacket
Joyce	1	Smock	1	Peacoat Jacket
Rumana	3	Gathered Top	2	A-Line Coat
Tracey	6	Spot Shift Dress	3	Tweed Cardigan Jacket

=== Episode 6: Active Wear Week ===
Sewer	Pattern Challenge (Men's Cycle Shirt)	Alteration challenge (Ski Suit)		Made-to-measure (Yoga Outfit)
Charlotte	3	Fur Trimmed Duffel	4	Drapey Yoga Outfit
Jade	4	80's Puffy Coat	1	Contrast Panel Yoga Outfit
Joyce	2	Bomber Jacket	3	Yoga Leggings and T-shirt
Rumana	5	Pink Bird Coat	2	Vest Yoga Outfit
Tracey	1	Blue Coat	5	Criss-cross Yoga Outfit

=== Episode 7: Puzzling Pattern Week ===
Sewer	Pattern Challenge (Yoke Drape Skirt)	Alteration challenge (Child's Duvet)		Made-to-measure (Bespoke Daydress)
Charlotte	1	Collared Dress	1	Cowl Neck Dress
Jade	3	Draped Dress	3	Skater Skirt Dress
Joyce	2	Beach Dress	4	Panelled Tea Dress
Tracey	4	Pleated Top and Skirt	2	1950s Style Dress

=== Episode 8: Evening Wear Week ===
Sewer	Pattern Challenge (Men's Dress Shirt)	Alteration challenge (Dinner Suit)		Made-to-measure (Evening Gown)
Charlotte	3	Halter LBD	1	Satin & Diamonte Gown
Jade	2	Chunky Zip LBD	2	Beaded Gown
Joyce	1	Sequin LBD	3	Bodice & Bustle Skirt

== Ratings ==
Episode no.	Airdate	Total viewers (millions)	BBC Two weekly ranking
1	16 May 2016	3.48	2
2	23 May 2016	3.46	2
3	30 May 2016	3.54	2
4	6 June 2016	3.36	2
5	13 June 2016	3.46	1
6	20 June 2016	2.92	2
7	27 June 2016	2.91	1
8	4 July 2016	3.27	1
