= Patricia Collins =

Patricia Collins may refer to:

- Patricia Hill Collins, professor of sociology at the University of Maryland, College Park
- Patricia M. Collins, Maine civic leader and former mayor of Caribou, Maine
- Patricia S. Collins, director of the US Bureau of Engraving and Printing
- Patricia Collins (actress), British-Canadian actress
- Patricia Collins (Fair City character), fictional character from Irish soap opera Fair City
- Tish Collins, CEO of Associated Country Women of the World
