= Love To Sew =

Canadian sewing podcast

- Genre: Sewing; Design
- Language: English

Production
- Production: Helen Wilkinson and Caroline Somos (2017–present)
- Length: ca. 60 minutes

Publication
- No. of episodes: 121 (as of November 2019)
- Original release: August 11, 2017
- Provider: Independent
- Updates: Active, weekly

Love To Sew is a Canadian sewing podcast hosted by Helen Wilkinson and Caroline Somos focused on handmade clothing. In 2019, Love To Sew was included on Simply Sewing's list of best sewing podcasts.

== Description ==
Based in Vancouver, British Columbia, the podcast launched in August 2017 because the presenters had found there were not many sewing-related podcasts.

The weekly episodes include interviews with sewers, pattern designers or small business owners, along with discussions and advice about sewing techniques, pattern adjustments, fabric choices, sewing machines, and notions. Guests on the show have included former The Great British Sewing Bee contestant Tilly Walnes, actress Jasika Nicole, author Gretchen Rubin and designer Jen Beeman. The hosts, who met on Instagram, both run sewing-related businesses in Vancouver. Wilkinson is the operator for pattern company Helen's Closet Patterns and Samos runs the online fabric store Blackbird Fabrics. In 2019, Love To Sew was included on Simply Sewing's list of best sewing podcasts which highlighted the show's discussions about pattern hacking and sewing swimwear as part of the Sewing Skills series.
