= Voices of the W.I. =

Studio album by The Harmonies
- Released: 25 October 2010
- Recorded: July–September 2010; Abbey Road Studios, London
- Genre: Pop
- Label: Universal

Singles from Voices of the W.I.
- 1. "Jerusalem" Released: 12 December 2010

Voices of the W.I. is the debut album by Women's Institute-founded British group The Harmonies, released on 25 October 2010 by Universal Music. The album is a collection of covers, including the Women's Institute theme song "Jerusalem", as well as two new songs. The album's first single, "Jerusalem" was released on 12 December 2010.

== History ==
The five members of the band were picked in July 2010 and following a £1 million record deal signed with Universal, work on the album began immediately in Abbey Road Studios, London. The album was finished by September 2010, around the time the line-up of the band was announced.

== Promotion ==
The group appeared on many UK TV and radio shows including Daybreak, This Morning, QVC, The One Show and BBC Radio 2, to name a few, over September and October 2010. Dates for a national arena tour have yet to be announced for early 2011.

== Reviews ==
Professional ratings
Review scores
Source	Rating
Express	3/5 stars

The Express newspaper gave the album a favourable review of three out of five, stating that "the voices are a delight and the production sweet but it’s the song choices that make this a winner, from the WI theme tune Jerusalem through You’ve Got a Friend, Wonderful World and Annie’s Song" saying further that the album is "even more delicious than a pot of home-made jam".

== Track listing ==
No.	Title	Writer(s)	Original artist	Length
1.	"Jerusalem"	Hubert Parry	Traditional	3:10
2.	"Wonderful World"	Bob Thiele, George David Weiss	Louis Armstrong	3:03
3.	"You've Got a Friend"	Carole King	James Taylor	4:22
4.	"When I Fall in Love"	Victor Young, Edward Heyman	Doris Day	2:44
5.	"Dream a Little Dream"	Fabian Andre, Wilbur Schwandt, Gus Kahn	Ozzie Nelson	2:55
6.	"Annie's Song"	John Denver	John Denver	2:39
7.	"The Best That I Can Be"	Philip Tennant, John Farmer	Original	3:25
8.	"Imagine"	John Lennon	John Lennon	2:42
9.	"Wild Mountain Thyme"	William McPeake	Van Morrison	4:00
10.	"Smile"	John Turner, Geoffrey Parsons	Charlie Chaplin	2:13
11.	"Teach Your Children"	Graham Nash	Crosby, Stills, Nash & Young	2:53
12.	"The Curve of the Earth"	??	??	4:30
13.	"Reach Out and Touch (Somebody's Hand)"	Nickolas Ashford, Valerie Simpson	Diana Ross	3:54
14.	"Jerusalem (Reprise)"			2:59

== Charts ==
Chart (2010)	Peak position
UK Albums Chart	42
