= Robert McCall (barrister) =

Irish lawyer (1849–1934)

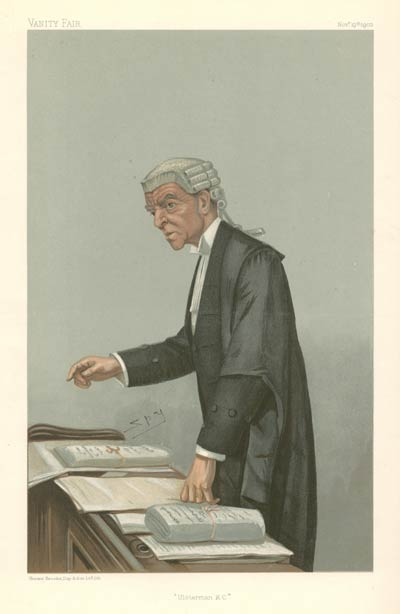
McCall wearing his Court robes as King's Counsel (previously Queen's Counsel from 1891 to 1901) drawn by "Spy"

Sir Robert Alfred McCall KCVO KC (9 July 1849 – April 1934) was an Irish lawyer.

== Life ==
McCall was born at Lisburn, County Antrim, and educated at the Queen's College Galway and Queen's College Belfast.

== Legal career ==
Called to the Bar by the Middle Temple in 1871. In 1891, having already acquired a large junior practice, he took silk (that is, was appointed Queen's Counsel). He served in numerous cases involving the common law and, while not making the first rank of Winch and Candy, was a powerful and popular advocate.

Politically, McCall was allied to the Unionist cause and was friendly with Lord James of Hereford. This friendship led to McCall's appointment as Attorney General and Queen's Serjeant to the Duchy of Lancaster.

He was elected as a Bencher of the Middle Temple in 1918. He was made a Commissioner of the Assize and K.C.V.O. (Knight Commander of the Royal Victorian Order) in 1921 and was also appointed as Registrar of the Railway and Canal Commission in the same year. He was senator of the University of London and President of the Huguenot Society of London in 1923.

He was a correspondent with The Times. There are three portraits of him in the National Portrait Gallery.

He married Alice Elizabeth MacSwinney of Galway in 1876 (McCall had attended university with her brother R. F. MacSwinney). They had four children and the last was Cicely McCall born in 1900. She was a psychiatric social worker and penal reformer.

He died in 1934.
