= The Great British Sewing Bee series 1 =

The Great British Sewing Bee
- Series 1
- No. of episodes: 4

Release
- Original network: BBC Two
- Original release: 2 April – 23 April 2013

Series chronology
- Next → Series 2

The first series of The Great British Sewing Bee started on 2 April and aired for four episodes concluding on 23 April 2013. The series was hosted by Claudia Winkleman and the judges were May Martin and Patrick Grant of Savile Row.

== Sewers ==
Sewer	Age	Occupation	Hometown
Ann Rowley	82	Housewife	Birmingham
Jane Lake	57	Retired school photographer	Kent
Lauren Guthrie	27	Renovation project manager	Birmingham
Mark Sanders	41	HGV mechanic	Derbyshire
Michelle Osbourne Matthiasson	35	Manager at Centrepoint Charity	London
Sandra Lavender	48	Cleaner	Wolverhampton
Stuart Hillard	41	Sales manager	North Yorkshire
Tilly Walnes	32	Film festival project manager	London

== Results and eliminations ==
Colour key

Sewer got through to the next round
Sewer was eliminated
Sewer won Garment of the week
Sewer was the series runner-up
Sewer was the series winner
Sewer withdrew

Sewer	1	2	3	4
Ann			BG	Winner
Lauren				Runner-up
Sandra				Runner-up
Stuart		BG	OUT	
Tilly		OUT		
Mark	BG	OUT		
Michelle	OUT			
Jane	WDR			

== Episodes ==
Sewer eliminated Best Garment Winner

=== Episode 1 ===
Sewer	Pattern challenge (A-Line skirt)	Alteration challenge (Neckline)	Made-to-measure (Casual dress)
Ann	3	Borderie Anglaise	Crepe wool shift dress
Jane	4	—N/a	—N/a
Lauren	2	—N/a	—N/a
Mark	7	V-neck	Cotton colour block shift dress
Michelle	5	Square Neckline with lace panel insertion	Reversible silk wrap dress
Sandra	1	Facing scallop neckline	Tailored denim shirt dress
Stuart	8	—N/a	Empire-line dress with pleated skirt
Tilly	6	—N/a	Scalloped neck dress

=== Episode 2 ===
Sewer	Pattern challenge (Men's trousers)	Alteration challenge (Patch pockets)	Made-to-measure (Silk/satin blouse)
Ann	1	Diagonal checked square pockets	Fine silk cerise blouse
Lauren	2	Gathered floral pockets	Silk peplum blouse
Mark	6	Skull print pockets (angled)	18th century chemise
Sandra	4	Square polka dot pockets with folded corner	Frilly chiffon blouse
Stuart	5	Semi circle red "tulip" pockets	Raw silk chinese blouse
Tilly	3	Semi circle polka dot pockets	Shift blouse with red piping

=== Episode 3: Semifinal ===
Sewer	Pattern challenge (Child's dress)	Alteration challenge (Dart/pleat dress)	Made-to-measure (Jackets)
Ann	2	Fitted/tailored dress	Buclé tweed edge to edge jacket
Lauren	1	Dress with pleated skirt and orange belt	Fitted tweed hacking jacket
Sandra	3	Fitted dress with red piping	Softly tailored wrap collar jacket
Stuart	4	Side rippled dress	Boiled wool alpine jacket

=== Episode 4: Final ===
Sewer	Pattern challenge (Man's shirt)	Alteration challenge (An evening bag)	Made-to-measure (Evening dress)
Ann	1	Freeform couching	Lace and taffeta cocktail dress
Lauren	3	Sequin Zigzags	Sequin gown with asymmetric satin bodice
Sandra	2	Applique Petals	Teal satin gown with plunging back

== Ratings ==
Episode no.	Airdate	Total viewers (millions)	BBC Two weekly ranking
1	2 April 2013	2.99	2
2	9 April 2013	2.95	1
3	16 April 2013	2.88	2
4	23 April 2013	3.09	2
