= Cicely McCall =

British prison reformer and social worker (1900-2003)

Cicely McCall MBE
- from her autobiography
- Born: Cicely Alicia Winifred McCall; 13 July 1900; Kensington, London, England
- Died: 29 July 2003 (aged 103); Dunston, England
- Known for: British prison reformer
- Father: Robert McCall KC

Cicely Alicia Winifred McCall MBE (July 13, 1900 – July 29, 2003) was a British prison reformer and social worker. She published a book exposing the conditions in Holloway and in a borstal for girls. Her MBE was for mental health which was a returning theme of her life.

== Life ==
McCall was born in 1900 in Kensington. Her parents, (later Sir) Robert McCall and Alice Elizabeth (born Macswinney), were both born in Ireland. Her father became a King's Council and attorney-general of the duchy of Lancaster.

In 1926 she was in Egypt employed as the organising secretary for the International Bureau for the Suppression of the Traffic in Women and Children. In 1932 she was back in England where she began to be a social worker. She worked in London employed by the Charity Organization Society. She took an interest in the new field of psychiatric social work and she was funded by the American Commonwealth Fund to take a course organised by the London School of Economics. In 1935 she received a certificate in mental health. She was appointed at the assistant headmistress of the Borstal in Aylesbury. It was the first borstal institution for girls when it had opened in 1909 and it was then run by the reforming governor Lilian Barker. Her work in Aylesbury and later in Holloway Prison created the experiences that she included in her 1934 book, They Always Come Back. She exposed the conditions which the girls and women were subjected to, noting that the conditions for men and boys was superior. She believed that the cause was the poor training of staff. She was an unusual employee as she had the education and background to write books about the conditions she had witnessed. It was noted that her book failed to mention some success. For instance, the number of women prisoners was reducing.

At the outbreak of the Second World War she was very involved with the Women's Institute. In 1939 the national meeting had invited a German delegate to talk. She was very worried but the delegates welcomed her warmly noting that they were apolitical. Three months later and they were at war. McCall wrote about one of the stories retold about jam-making in the WI. Hawkinge WI in Kent had been reduced to just five members because of the effects of the war. The five remaining members had a canning machine and they made jam. They made 350 kg of jam. During an air raid the married members went to the air raid shelter, but the unmarried member stayed behind to stir the jam.

In 1943, she was at Denman College where despite the war there was a meeting of Women's Institutes delegates. She and Elizabeth [Betty] Christmas (1910-1956) organised a meeting whose recommendations were to be forwarded to William Beveridge whose report had been published the year before. The delegates discussed welfare and social support that could be available in a post-war Britain. McCall was there because of her work with the Education committee while Christmas was a general organiser.

After she stood unsuccessfully at the 1945 General Election as the Labour Party candidate in Bury St Edmunds. In 1946 she wrote a pamphlet titled Village Life and the Labour Party today which lauded the work of the Labour Party. The short pamphlet included the Tolpuddle Martyrs and the effect that a National Health Service would have on village life. McCall went to work as a psychiatric social worker at St Audry's Hospital. She stood again unsuccessfully as a parliamentary candidate and stayed at St Audry's Hospital until 1955. She was the warden of the Women's Institute's Denman College from 1957 to 1959.

In the 1973 Birthday Honours she became a Member of the Most Excellent Order of the British Empire as a result of her work after she retired in Norfolk. She had co-founded the Norfolk and Norwich Association for Mental Health.

In 1994, she published her autobiography, Looking Back from the Nineties.

McCall died in Dunston in 2003. Three years before, she had attended a service St Paul's Cathedral where the Queen Mother had joined the service with some other centenarians.
