= Federated Women's Institutes of Canada =

Canadian organization

- Dual logos of the organization
- Abbreviation: FWIC
- Formation: 1919
- Type: Organizations based in Canada with royal patronage
- Legal status: active
- Purpose: advocate and public voice, educator and network
- Headquarters: St. George, Ontario, Canada
- Location: 1,000 branches in 10 provinces
- Region served: Canada
- Members: 13,000 members
- Official language: English, French
- President: Lynn MacLean
- Website: https://fwic.ca/

The Federated Women's Institutes of Canada (also known as WI Canada) is an umbrella organization for Women's Institutes in Canada.

"The idea to form a national group was first considered in 1912. In 1914, however, when the war began the idea was abandoned. At the war's end, it was Miss Mary MacIssac, Superintendent of Alberta Women's Institute, who revived the idea. She realized the importance of organizing the rural women of Canada so they might speak as one voice for needed reforms, and the value of co-ordinating provincial groups for a more consistent organization. In February 1919, representatives of the provinces met in Winnipeg, Manitoba, to form the Federated Women's Institutes of Canada." - History of FWIC

== See also ==
- Adelaide Hunter Hoodless Homestead
- British Women's Institute
- List of Canadian organizations with royal patronage
- Women's rights in Canada
- Royal Commission on the Status of Women
- Erland Lee Museum
