= The Harmonies =

English five-piece pop girlband

- Origin: England
- Genres: Pop
- Years active: 2010–2011
- Labels: Universal (2010-2011)
- Members: Jan Mason; Gemma Woznicki; Doreen Connor; Jennie Mantell; Naomi Willmott
- Website: www.theharmonies.com

The Harmonies are a five-piece girlband formed in 2010, with the finalists of a competition with over 200,000 contestants organised by the Women's Institute and announced in February 2010, to create an album in celebration of the 95th anniversary of the WI.

== Music career ==
=== 2010-present: Voices of the W.I. ===
The line-up of the band was announced on 16 September 2010, with the group signing a £1 million recording contract with Universal Music. In order to promote the album, which was released on 25 October 2010, the group have appeared on many high-profile UK TV shows including Daybreak, This Morning, QVC and The One Show, among others. They have also performed at Prince Charles' "A Garden Party with a Difference" at St James's Palace, and a national arena tour in early 2011. The album entered the midweek charts at number 14 and dropped to number forty-two after its first week in the UK Singles Chart through lack of availability due to distribution issues, and then dropped out completely by its second week.

== Discography ==
=== Albums ===
Year	Album details	Peak chart positions	Certifications
Year	Album details	UK	Certifications
2010	Voices of the W.I.: Released: 25 October 2010; Label: Universal Music; Formats: CD, digital download	42	BPI: —
