= Jen Beeman =

American fashion designer

- Occupations: Designer, author
- Known for: pattern design
- Website: grainlinestudio.com

Jen Beeman is an American fashion designer and patternmaker based in Chicago, Illinois. She is as the owner of the sewing pattern company and blog Grainline Studio. She is a graduate of Columbia College where she studied fashion design with a focus on pattern making and technical design.

Grainline Studio started as a blog where Beeman, then a freelance pattern maker, wrote about her experience designing and sewing her own clothes. She began working on the site full-time after realizing there was a design gap in the offerings of the commercial pattern making industry. Beeman worked with her partner John Krohn, a graphic designer, to lay out her first commercial patterns. Krohn joined the company full-time in 2015 overseeing graphic design and shipping. The motivation behind Grainline Studio patterns was described by Beeman in a 2017 interview with Making as "clean, modern designs that women can wear every day and that can be made again and again". Her Archer Shirt pattern won the PatternReview.com award for Best Woven Top four years in a row (2014-2017). In addition to selling patterns, Beeman provides step-by-step tutorials and pattern variations, and hosts sewalongs as part of Grainline Studios online offerings.

In a 2014 Marketplace interview about disappearing jobs, Beeman talked about the human element of pattern making and the impact of mechanized production explaining that: "We're so removed from how our garments or products in general are made that they never assume that there's a person who does that". Beeman has also talked about her experience operating a small business. She appeared on the podcast Love To Sew in 2017 where she discussed balancing professional and personal demands while running a company.
