= Denman College =

Adult education college in Mercham, England

Denman
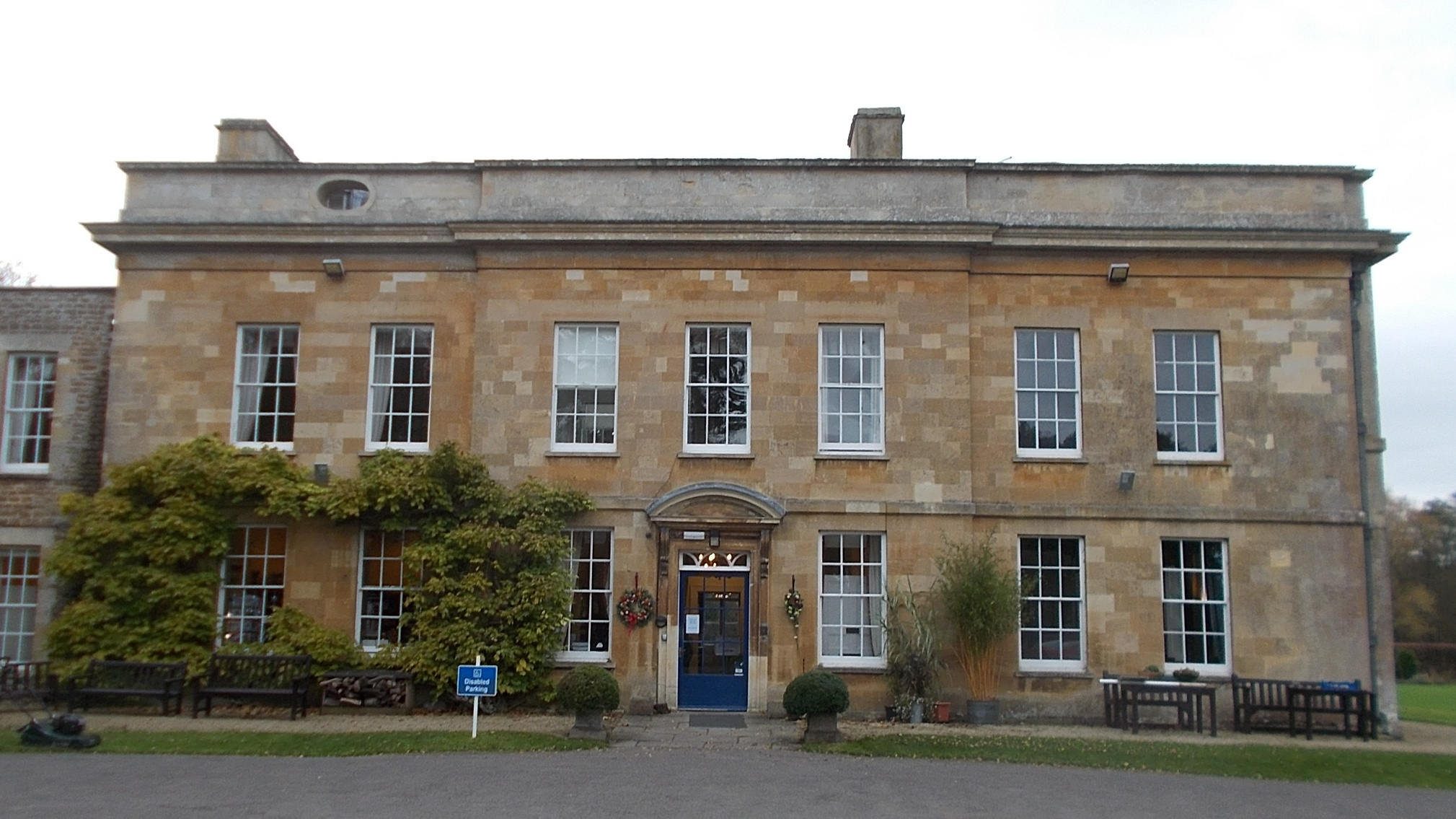
- Type: Adult education
- Established: 1948
- Location: Marcham, Oxfordshire, England; 51°40′8″N 1°20′49″W
- Website: www.denman.org.uk

Denman, formally Denman College, was a residential adult education college centred on what was Marcham Park at Marcham in the English county of Oxfordshire (formerly Berkshire). Founded by the National Federation of Women’s Institutes (NFWI) in 1948, Denman offered day schools and residential courses in cookery, craft and lifestyle, as well a variety of events, conferences and weddings.

In July 2020 the NFWI trustees announced the proposed permanent closure of the college.

== House ==
The central Georgian house was previously called Marcham Park and stands on the site of the original manor house of Marcham, which was a grange of Abingdon Abbey. The present house dates from the late 17th century but was heavily remodelled for Thomas Duffield in around 1820. Its most well-known resident was Duffield's grandfather-in-law, the infamous miser, John Elwes.

The house is Grade II listed and on 9 November 2015, the centenary of the first WI meeting in England, Denman's entry in the National Heritage List for England was updated to include the WI connection, as were records for three other buildings of WI significance.

== Women's Institute college ==
In 1943, despite the war, there was a meeting of Women's Institutes delegates here. Cicely McCall and Elizabeth (Betty) Christmas (1910-1956) organised a meeting whose recommendations were to be forwarded to William Beveridge whose report had been published the year before. The delegates discussed welfare and social support that could be available in a post-war Britain. McCall was there because of her work with the Education committee while Christmas was a general organiser. Betty Christmas and later McCall were to be wardens of Denham College.

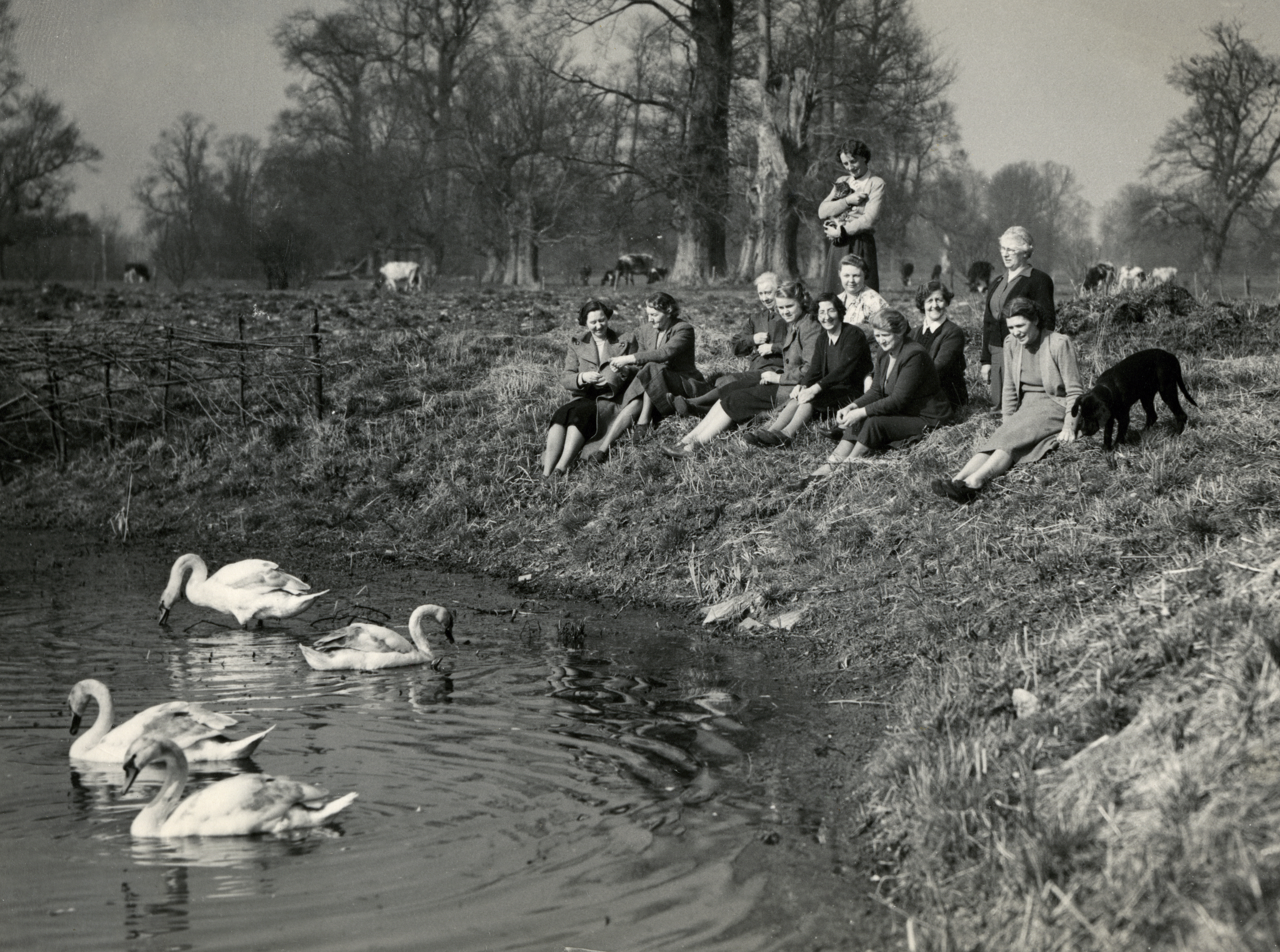
Staff and students at the lake, 1950s

The college was formally established in 1948, and named after Lady Denman, the first chairwoman of the WI federation. By the 21st century, students attending Denman did not have to be members of the WI, and the college accepted male and female learners, as well as those with young children for family courses in the Cookery School.

Residential courses at Denman lasted between one and four nights, and non-residential day courses were also offered. Course subject areas included arts, crafts, music, history, sport, technology and more. Denman was also the home of the WI Cookery School.

== Closure ==
In July 2020 the trustees announced that they could no longer afford to run Denman at a loss, and proposed its permanent closure.

== Notable staff ==
- May Martin, sewing teacher and judge on the The Great British Sewing Bee
