= Tilly Walnes =

English fashion designer

- Born: Matilda Rose Walnes; January 1980 (age 46); Poole, Dorset, England
- Occupations: Designer, author
- Years active: 2010–present
- Known for: Pattern design
- Website: www.tillyandthebuttons.com

Matilda Rose "Tilly" Walnes (born January 1980) is an English fashion designer, author and educator. Based in South London, she designs plain language sewing patterns and holds online workshops.

Walnes studied at the London College of Fashion after taking and enjoying an introduction to sewing class. Inspired by late 1960s fashion and the French New Wave, she began sewing her own clothes in 2010 and launched Tilly and the Buttons as a way to share what she made and connect with other sewers.

The success of the blog led to a career change so that she could work full-time on dressmaking, pattern design and sewing-related teaching and writing, putting to use her previous experience designing educational resources. She wanted to create sewing resources with visual, plain language instructions after finding that the books she relied on while learning how to sew often relied on hard-to-follow jargon.

In 2013, Walnes appeared on the first series of The Great British Sewing Bee. She was eliminated during the second week after struggling with a self-drafted blouse pattern. In a 2014 interview with PatternReview.com, Walnes described the garments she made on the show as some of the hardest she's done, explaining: "On the show, you are working to a tight deadline, under hot lights, while being interviewed by camera crews the whole time. It's so easy to forget the basics and mess things up under that kind of pressure!"

Walnes' work has been recognised by Sew magazine's British Sewing Awards, including Best Sewing Blog and Favourite Sewing Personality. In 2018 she discussed her career, personal style and balancing a business as a new mother on the Canadian podcast Love To Sew.

== Books ==
- Love at first stitch : demystifying dressmaking. Roost Books. 2014. p. 192. ISBN 9781611802344.
- Stretch! : make yourself comfortable sewing with knit fabrics. Quadrille Publishing. 2018. p. 192. ISBN 9781787131170.
- Make it Simple: Easy, Speedy Sewing Projects to Whip up in an Afternoon. 2020. ISBN 9781787134676
