= Country Markets =

Country Markets Limited is a United Kingdom cooperative limited company headquartered in Chesterfield, Derbyshire. It coordinates the organisation of regular sales of home-produced goods by individual producers. All Country Markets are run co-operatively with no table dedicated to any individual. Membership costs 5p and is open to anyone over the age of 16. Every member of each market is expected to take their turn staffing the stalls and helping to run the market. Each producer receives about 90% of the sales income from their produce monthly. These principles have shaped the markets since they were established by the Women's Institute in 1919.

The first Women's Institute Market took place in Lewes to sell surplus produce in 1919. WI County Federations supported the spread of WI Markets. In 1932, the Markets were registered as co-operatives under the Industrial Provident and Friendly Societies Act 1893. Their combined annual turnover reached £1m in 1972 and £10m in 1992. The Markets separated from The National Federation of Women's Institutes in 1995 and became self-financing. As of 2003, there were 500 Country Markets run across the country. In 2004 the company was renamed Country Markets Limited.
