= Tish Collins =

Patricia 'Tish' Collin
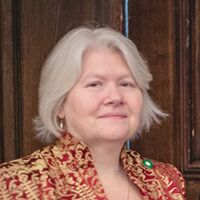
- Born: 1953 (age 72–73); London, UK
- Occupation: Chief Executive Officer of Associated Country Women of the World (ACWW)

Patricia 'Tish' Collins (born 1953) is chief executive officer of rural women's development charity Associated Country Women of the World (ACWW). Born in London, she studied in the UK and East Germany, and worked for the National Farmers' Union and several charities before starting with ACWW in 2014.

== Early life and studies ==
Tish Collins was born in London in December 1953, to a family of mixed Irish and British heritage. She studied at the University of Liverpool for bachelor's degree in Economics and Economic History, and completed an MSc in Agricultural Economics at Wye College, University of London in 1978. She undertook post-graduate research comparing the agricultural policies and structures of the Council for Mutual Economic Assistance and EU at the University of Rostock (formerly the Wilhelm-Pieck Universitat) in Rostock, East Germany in 1977 and 1978.

Ms Collins worked as a researcher for the Policy Studies Institute in London, before joining the National Farmer's Union as Principal Secretary of the Intensive Livestock Division.

== Work with charities ==
Between 1988 and 2005, Ms Collins was the Librarian of the Marx Memorial Library on London's historic Clerkenwell Green. During this time she supervised an extensive renovation and restoration programme. Her contributions to a large number of publications and television programmes included 'The Pankhursts: The History of One Radical Family' by Martin Pugh and 'Abel: The True Story of the Spy They Traded for Gary Powers' by Vin Arthey.

Tish left the Marx Memorial Library in 2005 to take up the post of Director at the London Irish Women's Centre, a support service for women of the Irish diaspora. The Centre provided counseling and advice services for these women, as well as providing a focal point for information for those in need. After five years, she left London and moved to Lichfield in the Midlands. Here she took up the role of Director of Fundraising at Lichfield Cathedral. Having raised more than £1,000,000 for the restoration of the Cathedral's Herkenrode Glass during her four year tenure, she left the Cathedral in May 2014.

In her new role as operations manager, and latterly chief executive officer, at the Associated Country Women of the World, Tish leads the Central Office team of the world's largest rural women's development organisation. Working alongside World President Ruth Shanks AM, she is responsible for the maintenance and development of a network spanning more than 79 countries, hundreds of development projects and an advocacy programme in support of ACWW's consultative status with UN agencies including UNESCO, ECOSOC and UNICEF.
