= Women's Institute =

Voluntary women's organization

The Women's Institute (WI) is a community-based organization for women in Canada, the United Kingdom, South Africa and New Zealand. The movement was founded in Stoney Creek, Ontario, Canada, by Erland and Janet Lee with Adelaide Hoodless being the first speaker in 1897. It was based on the British concept of Women's Guilds, created by Rev. Archibald Charteris in 1887 and originally confined to the Church of Scotland. From Canada, the organization spread back to Britain, throughout the British Empire and Commonwealth, and to other countries. Many WIs belong to the Associated Country Women of the World organization.

== History ==
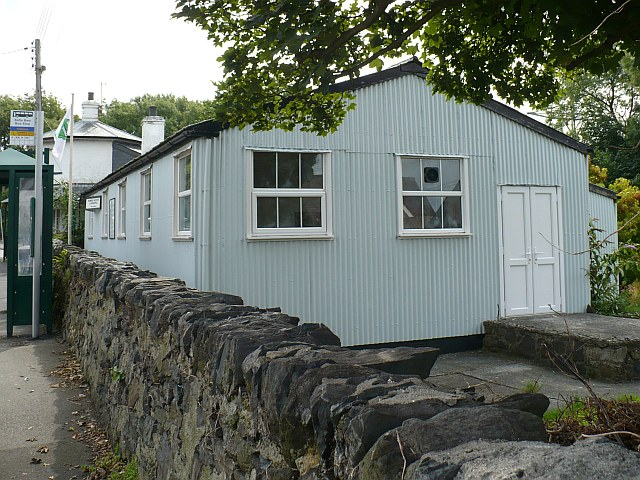
Women's Institute building in Llanfairpwll, Wales. Dating from 1915, this is the oldest WI in Britain.

The WI movement began at Stoney Creek, Ontario, Canada, in 1897 when Adelaide Hoodless addressed a meeting for the wives of members of the Farmers' Institute. WIs quickly spread throughout Ontario and Canada, with 130 branches launched by 1905 in Ontario alone, and the groups flourish in their home province today. As of 2013, the Federated Women's Institutes of Ontario (FWIO) had more than 300 branches with more than 4,500 members.

Madge Watt, a founder member of the first WI in British Columbia, organised the first WI meeting in the United Kingdom, which took place on 16 September 1915 at Llanfairpwll on Anglesey, Wales. The organization had two aims: to revitalise rural communities and to encourage women to become more involved in producing food during the First World War.

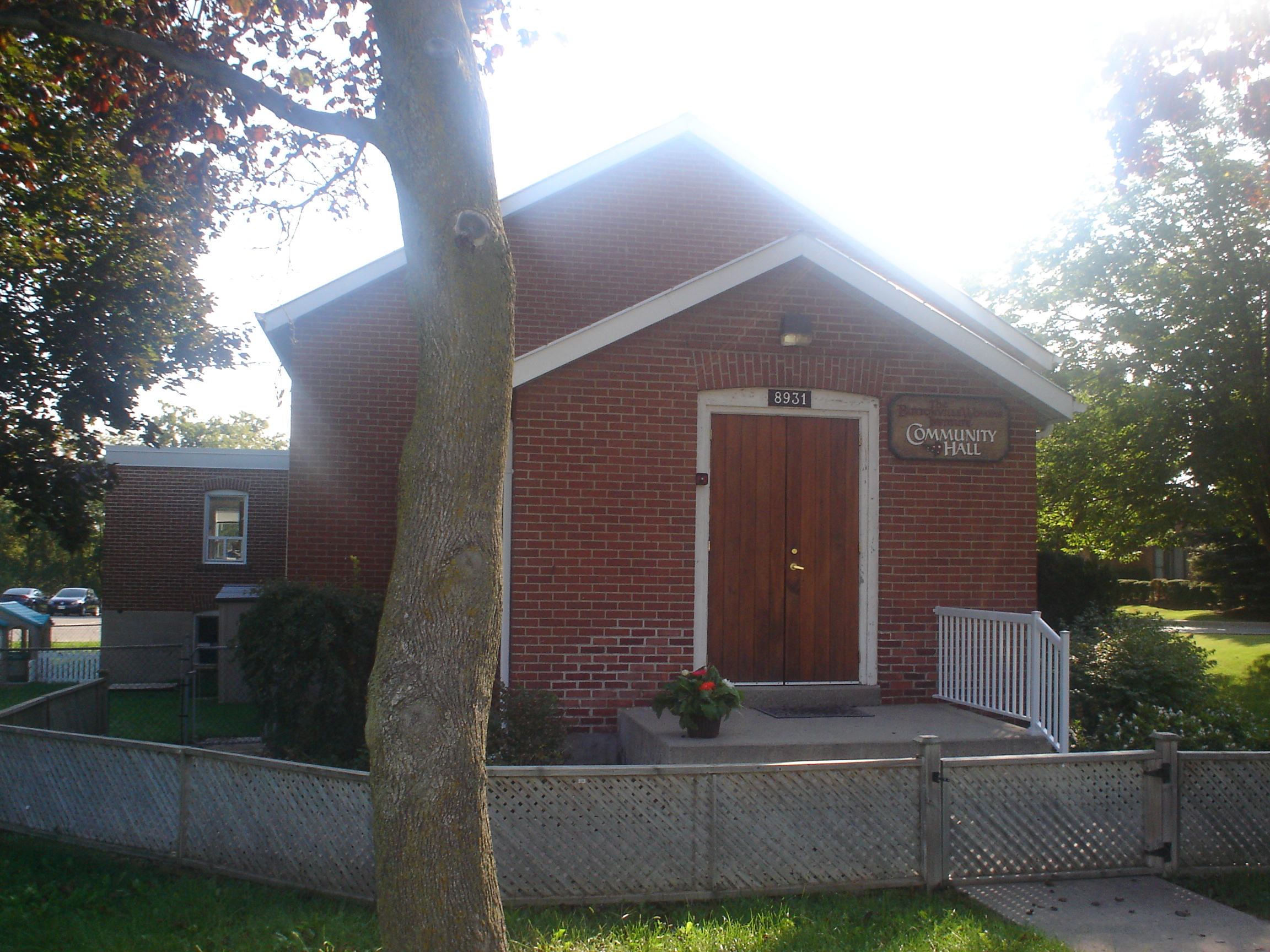
Former Buttonville Women's Institute Hall in Markham, Ontario, Canada. The WI closed in the 1980s, and the hall is now used as a daycare and a community centre.

Women's Institutes were formed in Scotland and Northern Ireland independently of those in England and Wales. The first Women's Rural Institute started in Scotland on 26 June 1917, and Madge Watt travelled up from London to speak to a meeting at Longniddry. After the end of the Great War, Watt returned to Canada where she continued as an activist for the interests of rural women. In 1930 she founded the Associated Country Women of the World (ACWW).

At the end of World War I, the British Board of Agriculture withdrew its sponsorship, but the Development Commission financially supported the work of the forming of new WIs and gave core funding to the National Federation until it could become financially independent. In 1925, Pollie Hirst Simpson was appointed the WI's first national agricultural adviser, and by 1926, the Women's Institutes were fully independent and rapidly became a prominent part of rural life.

One of their features was an independence from political parties or institutions, or church or chapel, which encouraged activism by non-establishment women, which helps to explain why the WI has been extremely reluctant to support anything that can be construed as war work, despite their wartime formation. During the Second World War, they limited their contribution to such activities as looking after evacuees, and running the Government-sponsored Preservation Centres where volunteers canned or made jam of excess produce; all this produce was sent to depots to be added to the rations.

Women's Institutes in England, Wales, Jersey, Guernsey and the Isle of Man are affiliated with the National Federation of Women's Institutes. In Scotland and Northern Ireland there are similar organizations tied to the WI through the Associated Country Women of the World: the Scottish Women's Rural Institutes and the Women's Institutes of Northern Ireland.

== England, Wales, the Isle of Man and the Channel Islands ==
=== Structure and membership ===
Each individual WI is a separate charitable organization, run by and for its own members with a constitution agreed at national level but the possibility of local bye-laws. WIs are grouped into Federations, roughly corresponding to counties or islands, which each have a local office and one or more paid staff. The National Federation of Women's Institutes (NFWI) is the overall body of the WI in England, Wales, the Channel Islands and the Isle of Man, with headquarters in London. There is also an office in Cardiff, NFWI-Wales. WI Enterprises is the trading arm of the organization and exists to raise funds and provide benefits for members. As of January 2019 there were approximately 220,000 members of 6,300 Women's Institutes in England, Wales and the islands, linked through the Associated Country Women of the World to other WIs worldwide.

The WI is a women-only organization. Colonel Richard Stapleton-Cotton and his dog Tinker are the only two males ever to be accepted as fully paid-up WI members: the Colonel, a "highly influential man locally", played a major part in setting up the first WI meeting in Anglesey in 1915.

From the 1970s, trans women were included, and that policy became official in 2015. In a 2017 statement, Transgender WI membership, the organization clarified that "Anyone who is living as a woman is welcome to join the WI and to participate in any WI activities in the same way as any other woman". However, following the 2025 UK supreme court ruling in For Women Scotland, the organization said it was being legally compelled to exclude trans women from membership, a policy that would begin in April 2026. In response, several branches suspended activities out of refusal to comply with the ban. At least 12 Women’s Institute (WI) groups are closing or considering closure after the organisation barred transgender women from membership.

=== Campaigns ===
The WI campaigns on a wide range of issues affecting women, based on resolutions agreed at each year's national Annual Meeting. Its first resolution, passed in 1918, called for "sufficient supply of convenient and sanitary houses, being of vital importance to women in the country". In 1943 they called for "Equal Pay for Equal Work" and continued to argue for this until the Equal Pay Act 1970 was passed. 1954's resolution to "‘preserve the countryside against desecration by litter" lead to the formation of the Keep Britain Tidy group, which became a registered charity in 1960. The WI discussed HIV/AIDS in 1986, agreeing "to inform the general public of the true facts concerning the disease AIDS" and subsequently working with the Terence Higgins Trust to produce a leaflet on "Women and AIDS". The 2017 meeting passed a motion on microplastics pollution or "Plastic soup", and in 2018 the WI agreed to "Make Time for Mental Health", "calling on members to take action to make it as acceptable to talk about mental health as it is about physical health".

=== Activities ===
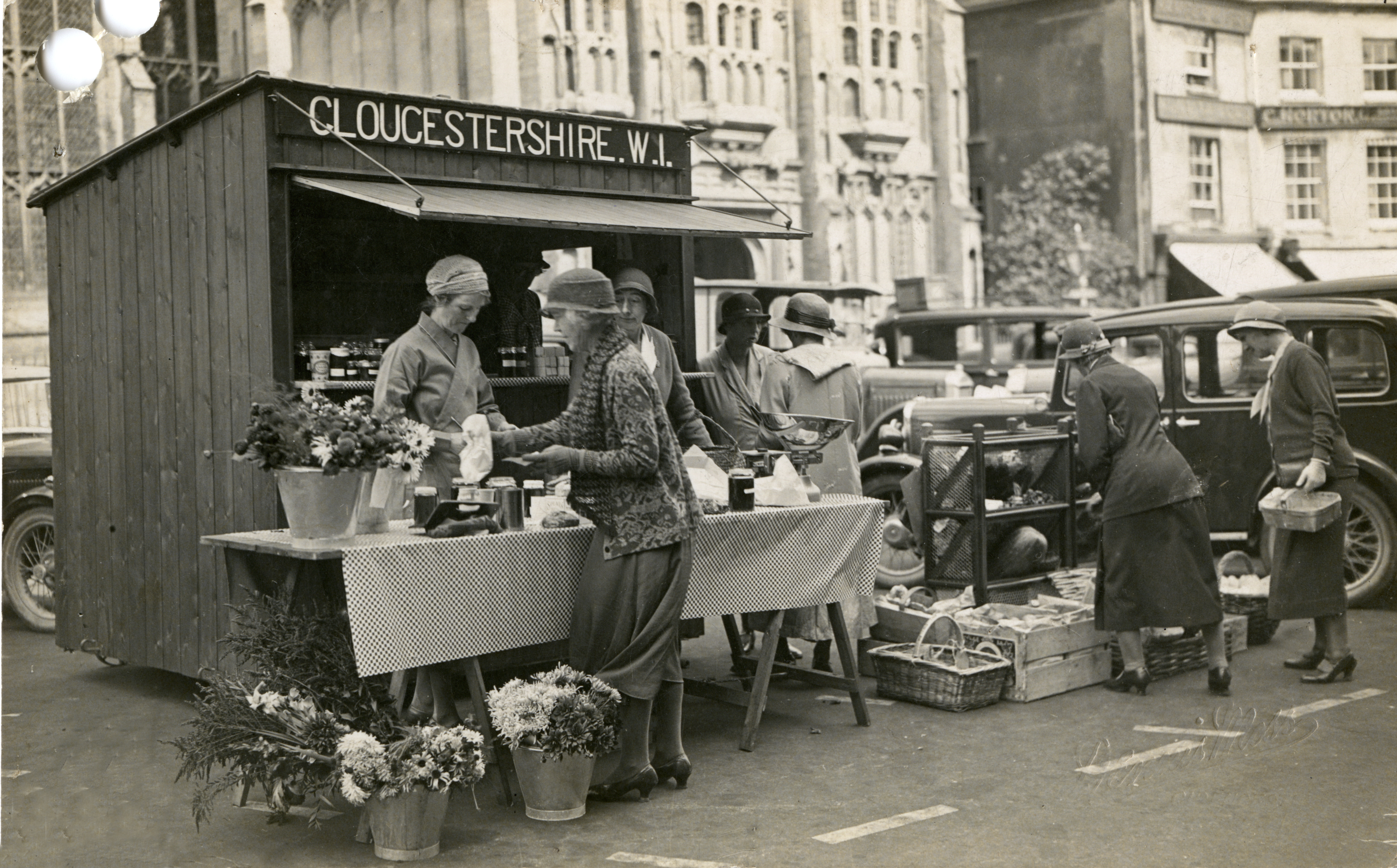
A 1933 WI produce stall in Cirencester

Every individual WI meets at least once a month. There is usually a speaker, demonstration or activity at every meeting for members to learn and develop a range of different skills.

Craft has always played an important role in the WI and thousands of members are involved in a range of different crafts.

The Women's Institute is often associated with food, cooking and healthy eating, and food and cooking form an important part of the WI's history.

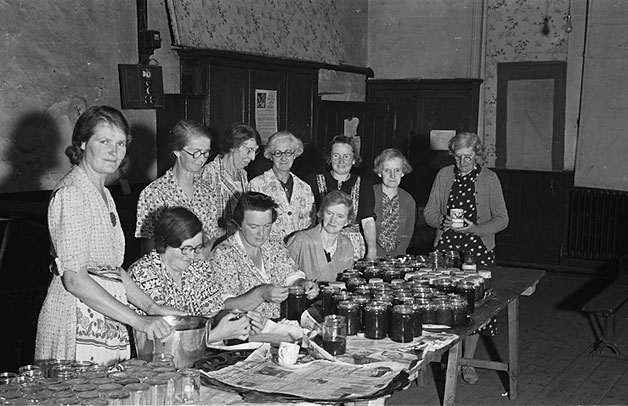
1941: Members of Meifod WI busy "jamming" under the Ministry of Food fruit preserving scheme

Home-prepared foods continue to be a staple for the institute. Country Markets Limited is now independent of the WI but its markets were formerly known as "WI Markets" and it was previously part of the NFWI.

=== Denman ===
In 1948, NFWI bought Marcham Park in Berkshire, England and converted it into a short-stay residential adult education college, named Denman College in honour of Lady Gertrude Denman. Now referred to as Denman, it has grown and developed over the years and is a well-appointed adult education centre attended by approximately 10,000 students each year. It is open to non-members as well as members. Courses offered at Denman include yoga, history of fashion and dance.

The WI Cookery School at Denman offers a range of over 100 day schools, residential courses and family courses. The courses are tutored by specialists.

In July 2020, the NFWI announced that Denman College would be closing permanently due to longstanding financial difficulties exacerbated by the COVID-19 pandemic.

=== WI Life ===
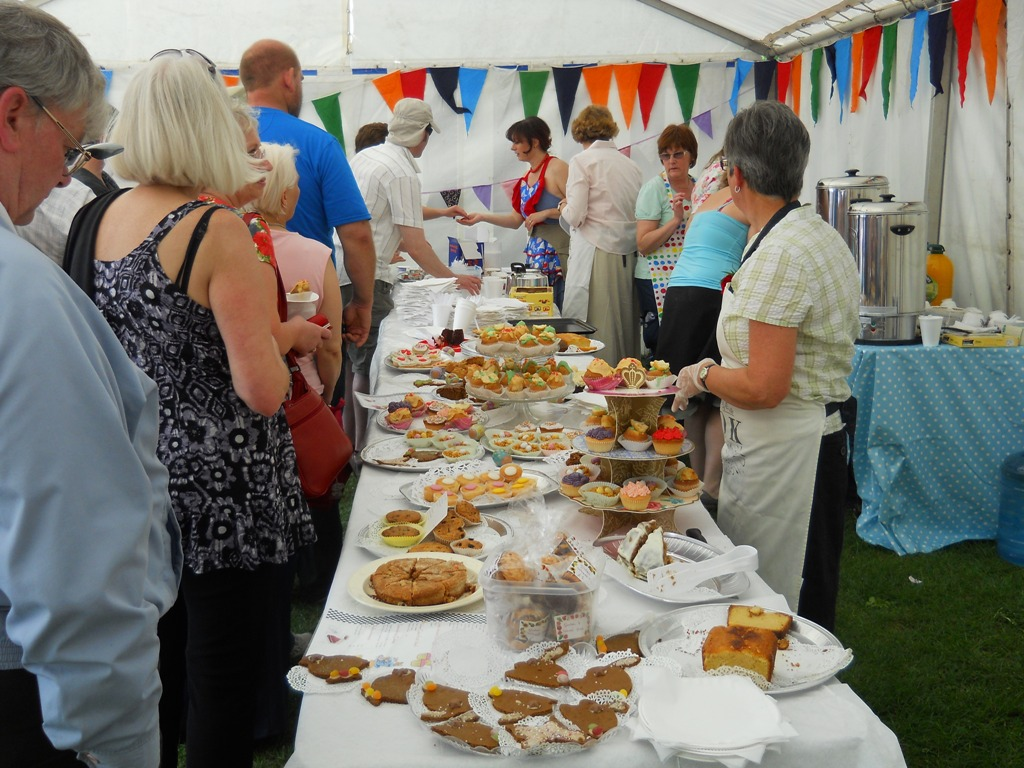
Women's Institute serving refreshments at a Saint George's Day event in Rochester, Kent

The NFWI produces a membership magazine, WI Life. Published eight times a year, WI Life is delivered (as of 2017) to more than 220,000 WI members.

=== "Jerusalem" ===
During the 1920s, many WIs started choirs and NFWI set up a music committee. W.H. Leslie, an amateur musician from Llansantffraid, Shropshire, acted as an advisor, and held a one-day school for village conductors in London in early 1924. He asked his friend Sir Walford Davies to write an arrangement of Hubert Parry's setting of "Jerusalem", for WI choirs. This hymn, with its association with the fight for women's suffrage, was considered appropriate for the emerging WI movement which was encouraging women to take their part in public life, and to improve the conditions of rural life. Leslie suggested that Walford Davies' special arrangement for choir and string orchestra should be performed at the Annual General Meeting of NFWI held in the Queen's Hall, London in 1924. He conducted the singing, bringing a choir from local WIs with him to lead.

This was so successful that it continues to be sung at the opening of NFWI AGMs, and many WIs open meetings by singing "Jerusalem", although it has never been adopted as the WI's official anthem.

As part of the 95th anniversary celebration, a "modern" version of "Jerusalem" was recorded by The Harmonies, selected from entrants from the "WI Search for a Star" competition. It was released in 2010 as part of the album Voices of the W.I.

=== Royal membership ===
Queen Elizabeth II was a member from 1943 until her death in 2022, and was President of Sandringham WI. Her mother Queen Elizabeth was also a member, as are Sophie, Duchess of Edinburgh; Anne, Princess Royal and Queen Camilla, who has been the President of Sandringham WI since 2024. Queen Elizabeth II attended the January meeting at Sandringham each year and in January 2019 referred to "common ground" and "never losing sight of the bigger picture" in a speech which was widely reported and interpreted as touching on the Brexit debate. The evening's guest speaker was Alexander Armstrong, host of TV show Pointless, and the Queen participated in a game of Pointless played at the meeting, on the winning side; Armstrong commented on her "deft, silky Pointless skills".

=== Archives ===
The archives of the National Federation of Women's Institutes are held at The Women's Library at the Library of the London School of Economics. The WI's archives are open to the public. The Library also holds a collection of Suffrage Interviews, titled Oral evidence on the suffragette and suffragist movements: the Brian Harrison interviews. Three interviews about Margaret Wintringham explore her role in the WI, both in Lincolnshire and with the NFWI at a national level. Other interviews, such as those with Margery Corbett-Ashby (April 1975), Kathleen Halpin and Gertrude Horton reflect on the relationship and differences between the WI and the Townswomen's Guilds.

== Scotland ==
The Scottish Women's Institutes (SWI) was formed in 1917 as the Scottish Women's Rural Institutes, and was renamed in 2015. As of January 2019 it had approximately 15,300 members in 700 institutes grouped into 32 federations. In 2013 the Scottish Women's Rural Institutes website traced its history to Stoney Creek and 1897, but as of January 2019 the "time line" on the official Scottish Women's Institutes website begins at Longniddry in 1917 with no mention of any Canadian roots.

== Northern Ireland ==
The first WI in Northern Ireland was formed at Garvagh, County Londonderry, in 1932 and the Federation of Women's Institutes of Northern Ireland was established in 1942. As of January 2019 there were about 5,000 members of 154 institutes grouped into 21 areas.

== Canada ==
In Canada the Federated Women's Institutes of Canada (FWIC) is the national organization, and provincial organizations including Federated Women's Institutes of Ontario. As of January 2019 there were 8,000 members in 672 branches across 10 provinces.

== New Zealand ==
The New Zealand Federation of Women's Institutes was founded in 1921 and was previously known as The Dominion Federation of Women's Institutes (from 1932), The Dominion Federation of Country Women's Institutes (from 1952) and the New Zealand Federation of Country Women's Institutes (from 1982) before acquiring its current name in 2004. As of 2018 it had over 4,000 members in 245 Local WIs grouped into 38 District Federations.

== South Africa ==
There are Women's Institutes in South Africa, some long-established: Eikenhof WI celebrated its 65th birthday in 2017 and Kloof its 80th in 2018.

== Southern Rhodesia (historical) ==
The Southern Rhodesia Federation of Women's Institutes was founded in 1925 as a "European-based" organization, and continued until at least 1985 as the National Federation of Women's Institutes of Zimbabwe.

== See also ==
- Calendar Girls – 2003 film based on a nude calendar produced by the Rylstone WI
- The Girls – 2015 musical based on the above film
- Jam & Jerusalem –2006 British television sitcom centred around a local WI, though referenced as a Women's Guild. Titled Clatterford in the United States, after the fictional West Country town where it takes place.
- Home Fires – 2015 British television series about a Cheshire WI during World War II
- National Memorial Arboretum – home to a drystone wall incorporating two seating areas, dedicated to the WI
- The Associated Country Women of the World (ACWW) – the largest international organization for both rural and urban women, of which the English and Welsh WIs are part
- Scottish Women's Institutes, formerly Scottish Women's Rural Institutes, the Scottish equivalent
- Country Women's Association (CWA), the Australian equivalent
- Home demonstration clubs - in US
- Merched y Wawr - Welsh language equivalent

== Notes ==
As of 28 February 2011, this article is derived in whole or in part from thewi.org.uk. The copyright holder has licensed the content in a manner that permits reuse under CC BY-SA 3.0 and GFDL. All relevant terms must be followed. The original text was at "History" An archived copy (24 July 2011) of that page is available

== Bibliography ==
- Andrews, Maggie – The Acceptable Face of Feminism, the Women's Institute as a social movement – Lawrence and Wishart 1997
- Connell, Linda and Stamper, Anne – Textile Treasures of the WI – NNA 2007
- Davies, Constance – A Grain of Mustard Seed – Gee and Son Denbigh, 2nd Ed. 1989
- Dudgeon, Piers – Village Voices, a portrait of change in England's Green and Pleasant Land Sidgwick and Jackson 1989
- Garner, Gwen – Extra Ordinary Women – WI Books 1995
- Goodenough, Simon – Jam and Jerusalem – Collins 1977 (ISBN 0 00 411807 3)
- Huxley, Gervas – Lady Denman G.B.E. – Chatto and Windus 1961
- Jenkins, Inez – The History of the Women's Institute Movement of England and Wales – OUP 1953
- McCall, Cicely – Women's Institutes – the Britain in Pictures series – Collins 1943
- Robertson Scott, J. W. – The Story of the Women's Institute Movement in England and Wales and Scotland – The Village Press – 1925
- Robinson, Jane – A Force to be Reckoned With: A History of the Women's Institute – Virago 2011 (ISBN 9781844086597)
- Stamper, Anne – Rooms off the Corridor, Education in the WI and 50 years of Denman College – WI Books 1998
