= Adelaide Hoodless =

Canadian educational reformer (1858–1910)

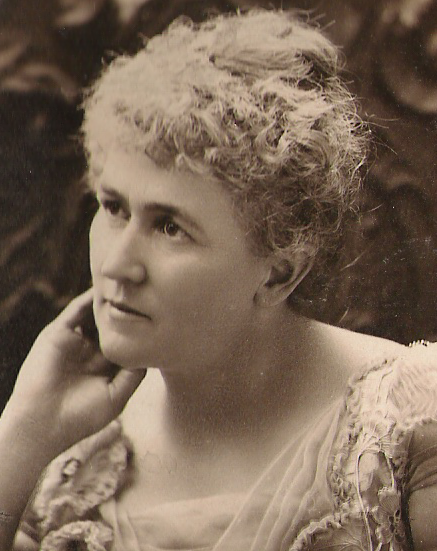
- Born: February 27, 1858; St George, Canada West
- Died: February 26, 1910 (aged 51); Toronto, Ontario, Canada
- Occupations: education reformer, administrator

Adelaide Sophia Hoodless (née Addie Hunter; February 27, 1858 – February 26, 1910) was a Canadian educational reformer whose work helped shape the development of domestic science in Canada.

Active in Hamilton, Ontario, she became a prominent public speaker, advocate, and organizer during a period of rapid change for women and families. Hoodless played a central role in the establishment of several major Canadian women’s organizations, including the Women’s Institute, the National Council of Women of Canada, the Young Women’s Christian Association (YWCA), and the Victorian Order of Nurses.

Her efforts to promote practical education for women and girls influenced provincial curricula and contributed to the creation of institutions such as the Macdonald Institute in Guelph. Hoodless remained a significant figure in Canadian public life until her sudden death in 1910, and she has since been recognized through national historic designations, memorials, and awards that reflect the lasting impact of her work.

== Biography ==
=== Early life ===
Adelaide Sophia Hoodless (née Addie Sophia Hunter) was born on 27 February 1858 at "The Willows," her family's farmhouse near St. George in Brant County, Canada West (now Ontario). She was the youngest of twelve children born to Jane Hamilton Hunter and David Hunter. Her father died only a few months after her birth, leaving her mother to manage the farm and raise the large household.

Hoodless grew up on the family farm in rural Brant County, where daily life was shaped by the routines of agricultural work and household labour typical of mid-19th-century rural Ontario. As the youngest child in a household led by a widowed mother, she was raised in an environment that required practical skills, cooperation, and self-reliance.

The Hunter family were part of a wider community of Irish immigrant settlers in Upper Canada. Hoodless's paternal grandparents had emigrated from County Monaghan in Ireland to Peel County in 1836. She spent her childhood and youth on the family farm before leaving Brant County after her marriage in 1881.

=== Education ===
Hoodless received her early schooling at a local one-room schoolhouse near the family farm in Brant County. Such schools typically educated children of many ages together in a single classroom and provided basic instruction in reading, writing, and arithmetic.

She later lived with her elder sister Elizabeth ("Lizzie") Charlton while attending Ladies' College at Cainsville, near Brantford, Ontario. The school offered one of the limited opportunities available to young women in the region for education beyond the rural schoolhouse.

Despite this period of study, Hoodless appears to have received little formal education beyond the elementary level. She remained on the family farm in Brant County until her marriage in 1881.

=== Marriage and family life ===
While staying with her elder sister Lizzie, she met John Hoodless, a close friend of Lizzie's future husband, Seth Charlton. John was the only surviving son of Joseph Hoodless, a prominent furniture manufacturer in Hamilton, Ontario. The two married on 14 September 1881, when Hunter was 23 years old. Around this time she adopted the more formal name Adelaide rather than the childhood nickname "Addie."

After their marriage the couple settled in Hamilton, where John Hoodless entered the family furniture manufacturing business founded by his father.

Hoodless entered the social and religious life of the city and converted from Presbyterianism to Anglicanism. She became an active member of the Church of the Ascension in Hamilton.

The couple had four children: Edna, Muriel, Bernard ("Bernie"), and John Harold. Their youngest child was born on 23 June 1888. Two months after his birth, Hoodless's mother, Jane Hamilton Hunter, died.

Less than a year after her mother's death, the family suffered another tragedy when John Harold died on 10 August 1889 at the age of fourteen months. His death was widely attributed at the time to "summer complaint," a digestive illness commonly associated with bacterial contamination in milk, although the official death register recorded meningitis as the cause. The loss deeply affected Hoodless and later shaped her efforts to promote safer household practices and improved domestic education.

== Career ==
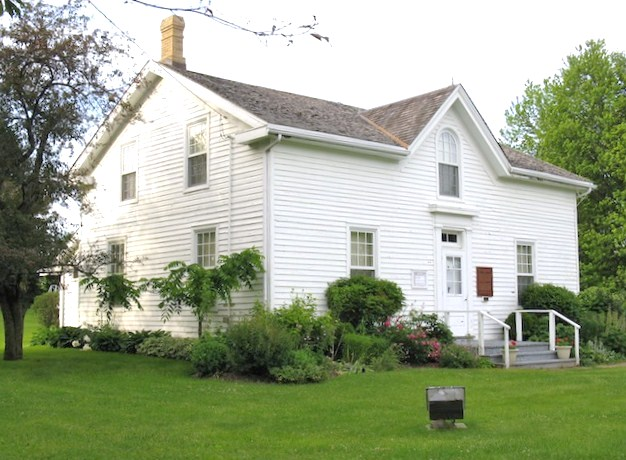
Adelaide Hunter Hoodless National Historic Site, St. George, Ontario

=== Domestic science work ===
It was after her son's death that Hoodless's public life began. She wanted to ensure that women had the knowledge to prevent deaths like those of her child and she devoted herself to the betterment of education for new mothers.

In addition to these projects, Hoodless travelled all over the province, speaking on the subject of domestic science. Noted for her public speaking skills, between 1894 and 1898 she gave 60 addresses.

In January 1897, the Minister of Education asked Hoodless to write a textbook for Domestic Science courses. In 1898 she published a book Public School Domestic Science. This became known as the 'Little Red Book'. It stressed the importance of hygiene, cleanliness and frugality.

=== Organizational leadership and founding work ===
Adelaide Hoodless became involved with the Hamilton Young Women's Christian Association (YWCA) during a period of growing interest in women's social and educational organizations. On May 1, 1889, after about 150 women met to discuss the need for such a group, the Hamilton YWCA opened its first building at 17 Main Street West. The building, now demolished, housed eight boarders and reflected the organization's early commitment to providing affordable accommodation for women.

Hoodless's belief in the YMCA was profound, stating, "We will be the greatest and strongest group of young women ever formed. I mean of women, by women and for women." In 1890, she became the second president of the Hamilton branch, a position she held until 1902.

In 1891, she took particular interest in improving "household work methods" for girls and supported the development of domestic science instruction through the YMCA. She also taught classes in domestic science (home economics).

The Hamilton YWCA continued to expand after her presidency. On May 1, 1915, following a major fundraising effort, the organization moved into a new seven-storey building with two hundred rooms, a development that became especially important during the First World War.

Hoodless's influence extended beyond Hamilton. Through her work with the National Council of Women of Canada, she met Lady Aberdeen, who was concerned about the lack of medical support in isolated communities. Their aims aligned, and Hoodless worked with her to help found the National Council of Women of Canada, the Victorian Order of Nurses, and the National Association of the YWCA. Hoodless is also credited with founding the Canadian National YWCA in 1895.

=== Women's Institute movement ===
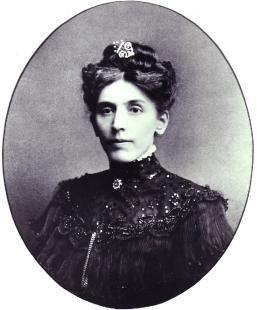
Christina Ann Smith of Hamilton

During her lecture tours across Ontario, Hoodless’s emphasis on practical domestic science reached rural communities eager for education and connection.

Erland Lee, of Stoney Creek, heard Hoodless speak, and her message resonated with him. Impressed by her ideas, he asked Hoodless to speak at his Farmer's Institute Ladies Night meeting, on February 12, 1897.

At that gathering, she delivered the proposal that would anchor a national movement. She suggested forming a group with a purpose to broaden the knowledge of domestic science and agriculture as well as to socialize. The idea was immediately embraced. This group was to become the first branch of the Women's Institute, with Hoodless as honorary president and Christina Ann Smith as president.

According to the Federated Women's Institutes of Canada, the first institute was founded in 1897 in Stoney Creek, and by 1913 branches existed in every province. The speed of this expansion reflects how effectively Hoodless’s approach met the needs of rural women seeking education, mutual support, and community improvement.

In 1919, provincial representatives met in Winnipeg to form the Federated Women’s Institutes of Canada (FWIC) as a national coordinating body, with a permanent office established in Ottawa in 1958. The FWIC adopted the motto "For Home and Country," emphasizing its aims to strengthen rural life, educate women, and engage with national and international issues affecting families. Through affiliation with the Associated Country Women of the World, Canadian institutes became part of a global network of women’s organizations with shared goals.

=== Higher education and institutional legacy ===
By October of 1902, the Ministry of Education was about to make domestic science a regular part of the curriculum in Ontario schools but Hoodless already had her sights on the next step. She wanted Domestic Science to be offered at the university level. She also knew she needed a wealthy patron to finance the project. She approached Sir William Christopher Macdonald, a wealthy Montreal non-smoker, who had made his money in tobacco. Her Ontario Normal School of Domestic Science and Art in Hamilton became the MacDonald Institute of Home Economics which became part of the University of Guelph. In 1907, the Women's Institute marked its 10th anniversary by commissioning Toronto artist John Wycliffe Lowes Forster to paint her portrait. The painting was donated to the MacDonald Institute.

=== Final public engagement ===
On February 26, 1910, Hoodless travelled by train to Toronto to speak at St. Margaret's College on "Women and Industrial Life". She began her remarks normally, but only a short time into the lecture her voice weakened and she paused to take water. Although she attempted to continue, she soon collapsed and was taken for medical attention. She died later that day from a cerebral hemorrhage. Her official death registration, however, recorded the cause of death as heart failure.

Hoodless was buried in Hamilton on March 1, 1910, the day after what would have been her fifty-second birthday.

== Legacy and honours ==
=== Historic designations ===
Adelaide Hunter Hoodless was designated a National Historic Person by the Historic Sites and Monuments Board of Canada in 1960, in recognition of her national influence on women’s education and domestic science.

Hoodless' childhood home in St George, Ontario, was acquired by the Federated Women's Institutes of Canada (FWIC) in 1959. It was renovated and styled to reflect the time period when Hoodless lived there. In 1995 it was designated a National Historic Site and now operates as a museum.

The Ontario Heritage Trust installed a provincial heritage plaque at the homestead to interpret Hoodless’s contributions to domestic science and women’s education. The building is also listed on the heritage register of the County of Brant, which ensures its preservation as a significant local historical resource.

=== Named places and physical memorials ===
A public elementary school in Hamilton, Ontario, was named in her honour. Adelaide Hoodless Public School opened in 1911, one year after her death, and continues to serve students from kindergarten to Grade 8.

Her birthplace operates as a museum administered by the Federated Women’s Institutes of Canada, restored to evoke the domestic environment in which Hoodless lived and worked.

A memorial cairn dedicated to Hoodless was unveiled on 27 October 1937 in St. George, Ontario, by Lady Tweedsmuir. It is one of the earliest public monuments to a Canadian woman reformer.

In 2003, the Hoodless Garden, was created as a part of numerous celebrations to mark the 100th anniversary of the founding of the MacDonald Institute in Guelph, Ontario. A sculpture by artist Jan Noestheden takes the form of a larger-than-life aluminum portrait, mounted 6" away from the wall, so light will shine through the image and cast a shadow.

In 1975, Dr. Henry Heard Marshall at Agriculture and Agri-Food Canada developed the 'Adelaide Hoodless rose' named after her. Part of the Explorer Rose Series, the cultivar is noted for its clusters of semi-double red blooms and its suitability for cold climates.

=== Awards and distinctions ===
The Federated Women’s Institutes of Canada presents the Adelaide Hunter Hoodless Canadian Woman of the Year Award to recognize exceptional community leadership among Canadian women.

Women’s Institute branches across Canada also maintain their own Adelaide Hoodless Awards, which honour service and leadership at the community level.

Some educational institutions and WI networks have periodically offered scholarships and bursaries named for Hoodless to support students in home economics and related fields.

=== Stamps and cultural commemorations ===
Canada Post issued a commemorative stamp featuring a portrait of Hoodless by artist Heather Cooper in 1993 as part of a series honouring influential Canadian women.

Portraits, interpretive artworks, and sculptural pieces appear in the Hoodless Homestead Museum and on the University of Guelph campus, forming part of the visual culture that preserves her legacy.
