= Erland Lee =

Canadian farmer, teacher and government employee

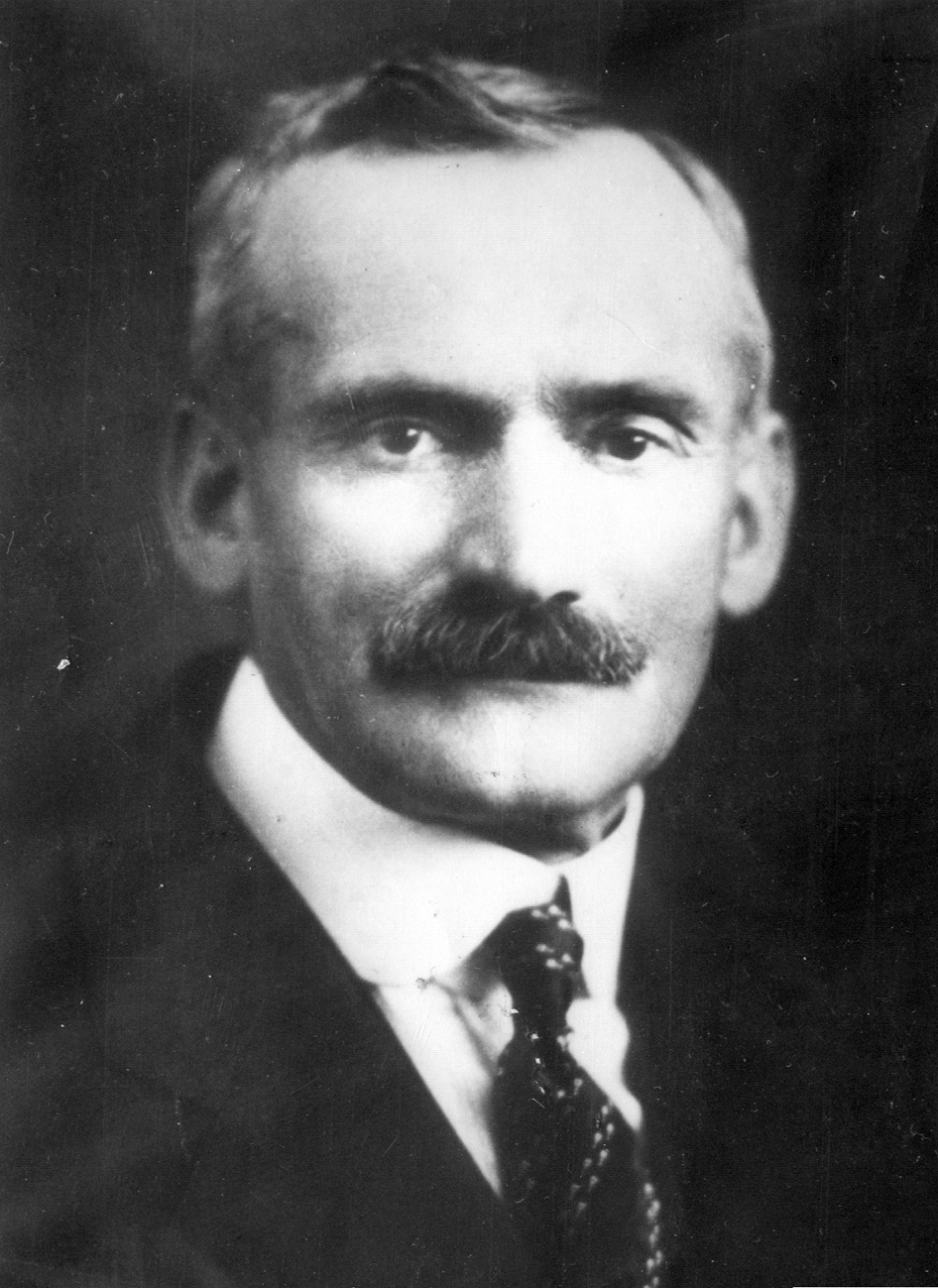
Erland Lee

Erland Lee (1864 – 1926) was a Canadian farmer, teacher, and government employee from Stoney Creek, Ontario. He was a co-founder of the Women's Institutes, an international organization originally formed to promote the education of isolated rural women.

== Life ==
Born on May 3, 1864, Erland was a prominent member of the Lee family, who came to the Niagara Peninsula in Canada (then British North America) as United Empire Loyalists in 1792, after the American Revolutionary War. They settled on top of the Niagara Escarpment, and cultivated a prosperous farm. The Lee Homestead, also known as "Edgemont," is currently the site of the Erland Lee Museum.

Erland Lee was the co-founder of the first Women's Institute in the world, along with Janet (Chisholm) Lee, his wife, and Adelaide Hoodless, an advocate of domestic science and women's education.

In February 1897, after hearing Hoodless give a lecture at the Ontario Agricultural College in Guelph- Erland invited Hoodless to deliver a speech at the annual "Ladies Night" held by the Farmer's Institute of Stoney Creek of which he was an influential member. Hoodless suggested during this speech that education in domestic science might best be achieved through an organization for women similar to the existing Farmer's Institutes for men. Hoodless (or Erland Lee) then suggested that women interested in discussing the formation of such a group might meet again the following week.

Erland and his wife Janet spent that week inviting and encouraging the women of Stoney Creek to attend this second meeting. On February 19, 1897, 101 rural Canadian homemakers agreed to create a Women's Institute, which would become the largest international rural women's movement ever established. Erland Lee was the only man in attendance, and acted as chairman of the first meeting.

The original Women's Institute constitution was written on February 25, 1897, on the Lee's dining room table. Erland Lee's political and financial support of the women's group was crucial to its expansion and success, and may be the only reason why the organization was recognized by the Canadian government during a time when women were not considered citizens.

Erland Lee was also a member of the Saltfleet Masonic Lodge, Treasurer-Clerk of Saltfleet Township, and a teacher educated at the Hamilton Normal School. He jointly owned and operated the Vinemount Creamery with his friend and local member of provincial parliament, Ernest D’Israeli (E.D.) Smith, and maintained a mixed farm atop the Niagara Escarpment.
