= May Martin =

English sewing teacher and television judge (born 1955 or 1956)

- Born: 1955 or 1956 (age 69–70)
- Occupations: sewing teacher television judge
- Known for: The Great British Sewing Bee

May Martin (born 1955 or 1956) is an English sewing teacher and a former judge on the BBC television programme The Great British Sewing Bee for series one to three, 2013–15.

== Early life and education ==
Martin attended St Osyth's College to train as a teacher.

== Career ==
Martin teaches sewing in adult education at Peter Symonds College in Hampshire, and taught dressmaking for the Women's Institute at Denman College. When she joined the Great British Sewing Bee, she had been teaching sewing for over forty years.

Martin was asked by the makers of The Great British Sewing Bee to audition as a judge for the first series, which was broadcast in 2013. She left the programme after the third series. She writes a column for the magazine Sew, starting in 2015.

== Personal life ==
Martin lives in Awbridge, near Romsey in Hampshire.

== Books ==
- May Martin's Sewing Bible: 40 years of tips and tricks on how to make your own fashion, home furnishings & crafts (2014, HarperCollins, ISBN 978-0007573042)
- Foreword and practical tips in The Great British Sewing Bee: Sew Your Own Wardrobe, by Tessa Evelegh (2014, Quadrille Publishing, ISBN 978-1849494144
