= Associated Country Women of the World =

- Formation: 1933
- Type: INGO
- Headquarters: The Foundry, 17 Oval Way, London SE11 5RR
- Region served: Worldwide
- Official language: English
- World President: Magdie de Kock
- Website: www.acww.org.uk

The Associated Country Women of the World (ACWW) is the largest international organization for rural women, with a membership of nine million in 82 countries (per 2023). ACWW holds a triennial conference and publishes a magazine, The Countrywoman, four times a year.

== History ==
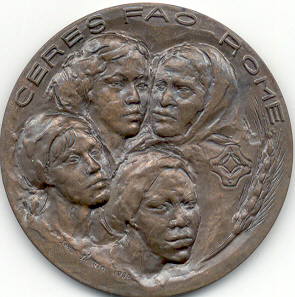
FAO Commemorative 1980 Assc Country Women Bronze Obverse

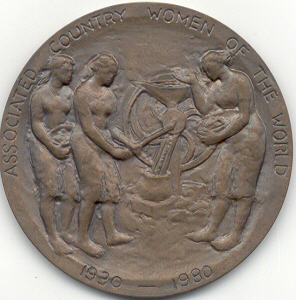
FAO Commemorative 1980 Assc Country Women Bronze Reverse

Late 19th Century – rural women's groups were set up independently. Communication between groups enabled more country women to come together in friendship and work towards similar goals.

London April 1929 – first International Conference of Rural Women – 46 women from 24 countries attended four-day conference.

Vienna 1930 – conference decision by the International Council of Women to form a 'Liaison Committee' of rural women's organizations.

Stockholm 1933 – the committee became the Associated Country Women of the World (ACWW).

In 1980, the Food and Agriculture Organization honored the Association with a commemorative medal calling it the 50th anniversary.

In 2013, ACWW-affiliated groups around the world celebrated the 80th anniversary of their founding. The British Columbia Women's Institutes marked the occasion with an article by WI Historian, Ruth Fenner. This followed her biography of founder, Mrs Alfred Watt.

== Mission ==
ACWW funds projects in the following areas:

- Literacy
- Health education
- Nutrition and home economics
- Agricultural training and development
- Income generation
- Water and sanitation
- Civic conscientiousness/community involvement

=== Aims and Objectives ===
OVERALL AIM

*Improved quality of life for women and communities world wide

*Empowerment of women, raising the standards of living for rural women and their families, and enabling their voices to be heard at the UN and global levels, including participation in the Sustainable Development Goals.

CHARITY OBJECTIVES

*The relief of poverty

*The relief of sickness and the protection and preservation of health

*The advancement of education

WHAT WE DO to achieve Charity Objectives

Carry out advocacy on behalf of rural women and their communities

Support education opportunities for rural women

Support the sharing of knowledge between rural women

Support partnership and local activities of rural women

Raise awareness of the needs and challenges in rural communities amongst non-rural women and others.

HOW ACWW WORKS

The resource ACWW has is its Member Societies around the world. Through the Triennial World Conference they elect the Board of Trustees, who appoint Specified Committees. Every three years Member Societies have the opportunity to bring forward policy resolutions to be voted on by the membership. If adopted, all Societies have a mandate to work to achieve these policy resolutions in their own countries.

The Board of Trustees adopts a Strategic Plan in each Triennium, and works to achieve its goals, in line with the wider Aims and Charitable Objectives of ACWW. Board Members and Central Office work to ensure representation at the United Nations, and to amplify the voices of members at the international level. Area Presidents work to unite the voices of members in their regions, and to raise local, national, and regional issues to the attention of the wider organisation.

ACWW Central Office creates resources to support the Board of Trustees and Member Societies, collects and maintains information, showcases the best practice of Members, and coordinates international exchange of ideas, best practice, and processes.

ACWW maintains partnerships with other organisations, and the Projects Committee and Board oversee the funding of small-scale, women-led development projects. These projects are delivered by local partners to ensure that local needs are met, local challenges are understood, and local voices are heard.

== See also ==
- Tish Collins
