= Iju, Ogun State =

Iju
- Town
- Nickname: Iju Gbalefa
- Location in Nigeria
- Coordinates: 6°36′38.6″N 3°5′8.5″E
- Country: Nigeria
- State: Ogun
- LGA: Ado-Odo/Ota
- War camp: Est. 1842 - 1845

Government
  - The Olu of Iju: HRM Oba Olufemi Sodeinde
  - Kingdom: Subset of Egba/Owu Kingdom
  - Governor: Dapo Abiodun

Population (2006)
  - Total: 50,000 plus
  - Estimate (2017): 75,000
- Time zone: UTC+1 (WAT)
- Climate: Tropical savanna climate (Aw)
- Website: http://www.ogunstate.gov.ng/

Iju also known as Iju Oloko [idʒou ɔ:lɔkɔ], is a Nigerian town located in southern Ogun state and about 18 kilometers from Lagos state, a major commercial hub in West Africa. The town is inhabited mostly by Egba/Owu natives whose ancestors settled there between 1842 and 1845.

== History ==
In the mid-19th century after the Egbas and Owus militarily occupied the areas that are geographically south of Abeokuta, a party of the Egba/Owu army settled in Iju as they found the terrain to be ideally suitable for ambush in a guerrilla warfare as the invasion of the Dahomean Amazons loomed. As the name implies, Iju was a dense forest. A river, locally called Odo-Iju, flowed through the thick vegetation of several trees with large canopies and into the Ologe Lagoon in Lagos. Before that, the Egba/Owu military occupation was a territory of the Ilogbos and the Ados.

== Wars ==
=== Dahomey ===
Prior to the Egba conquest, the Dahomean Amazons were known for their repeated raids on the Egbado, Ado, Ilogbo, and neighboring communities, during which many inhabitants were captured and sold into slavery. Among those taken was the five-year-old princess Omoba Aina (later known as Sarah Forbes Bonetta), who was enslaved after her parents were killed. Similarly, Ifaremilekun Fagbemi (later known as Seriki Abass) was captured and sold into slavery.

Following the establishment of Egba rule in the region, King Ghezo of Dahomey, and later his successor Glele, launched campaigns aimed at annexing Egbado and Awori territories, including parts of present-day Lagos, as part of a broader strategy leading toward conflict with Abeokuta. These campaigns were consistent with Dahomey’s expansionist policy, as the kingdom already received tribute from several towns in the Lagos area.

Forces of the Egba, including the Owu, engaged the Dahomean army from positions within Egba-controlled towns and camps. The Dahomeans were repelled on two occasions by Egba/Owu forces led by commanders such as Akindele Gbalefa, Lapeleke, and Awaye Sonlu.

The Dahomean wars are regarded as among the most significant conflicts in the region, largely due to the scale and influence of the Dahomey kingdom. The Egba victory was consequential, preserving Egba authority, preventing the annexation of Egbado and Awori territories, and averting a potential assault on Abeokuta itself. Despite the importance of these conflicts, the Egbado and Awori did not organize independent military resistance to defend territories under Egba control, though individuals from both groups contributed to the war effort by serving as informants for the Egba/Owu forces.

=== War Camp ===
Gbalefa, who acted as the Generalissimo of the Egba army established Iju in the thick forest as one of the many Egba command posts in the region. Also, between 1842 and 1913, Iju remained the meeting point where issues of Egba/Owu interest in the region were discussed.

== Economy ==
Early Owu/Egba settlers were mostly hunters, farmers and artisans whose products were transported to Lagos via Odo Iju (river). Canoe building was also fairly common, hence the name Iju Oloko. This translates to "Iju of canoes". Like neighboring towns such as Owode, Oke Odan and Ota, Iju is home to Idi-Iroko inter-country highway that connects the Republic of Benin and Nigeria. This highway facilitates the conduit of goods and services from the region to other parts of Nigeria and the Republic of Benin and vice versa.

== Religion ==
Many of the Egba/Owu settlers were mostly adherents of Ifa and Ogun. At the time of settlement, Ifa was the ubiquitous religion in Yorubaland while Ogun was traditionally the religion of warriors, hunters, blacksmiths and artisans. However, by the mid-20th century, many had adopted Christianity or Islam.

== Government ==
=== Local Government ===
Ado-Odo/Ota is a local government district that was established in 1989 as a merger of Egbado and Awori communities. Though the district was formed from territories that are overwhelmingly Egbado land, most of the population are concentrated in the smaller the Awori region. Iju and several towns such as Ado-Odo, Owode, Sango, Igbesa, Ota, etc, make up Ado-Odo/Ota local government and are all under the Egba authority.

=== Native Government ===
Military settlements similar to Iju were founded in other strategic locations to protect trade routes within Egba territories outside of Abeokuta. A survey and map of the area drawn by Ilaro Divisional Native Authority in 1913 under the stewardship of Ifaremilekun Fagbemi for district planning recognized Gbalefa Peninsula as an area of native authority that encompassed Iju and other towns. The survey was deemed acceptable by Awori, Egba and Egbado representatives.

Egba satellite towns and villages are customarily headed by a Baale, who acts as the town administrator and representative of Alake of Egbaland. In a bid to consolidate the authorities of the Egba Baales in the area called Gbalefa Peninsula, a member of the Gbalefa clan was recommended to be made king, but the Egba Administrative council rejected the recommendation on the grounds that no Egba king can be crowned outside Abeokuta. instead, the Egba satellite communities should have Baales. Another recommendation was made in 2017, and this time around, Oba Alake and Oba Olowu accepted the recommendation.

On November 2, 2017, the executive governor of Ogun state, Ibikunle Amosun, approved the request to have an Egba/Owu king in Iju town. On November 11, 2017, Olufemi Sodeinde, who is a High Chief in Owu Kingdom, was crowned as the first Olu of Iju-Gbalefa Egbaland. In attendance were President Olusegun Obasanjo, HRM Oba Dr. Olusanya Dosumu and several notable dignitaries. The coronation was attended and live-streamed by thousands of people.

== Industrialization ==
The neighboring Ota town, which is closer in proximity to Lagos, the commercial hub of the country, is teeming with factories and banks, schools, restaurants and hotels. These economic activities are fueling unprecedented population growth in the local government district. Most of this growth may be the result of migration from Lagos to the local government district.

Outside of Ado-Odo/Ota local government district, there are large geographical territories of the Aworis in Lagos state that are not under Egba authority. As the Awori population continues to grow at a fast rate in the local government district, they will be accommodated by the Egba and Egbado (now Yewa) population.
