= Gbalefa Peninsula =

- Location in Nigeria
- Coordinates: 6°36′38.6″N 3°5′8.5″E
- Country: Nigeria
- State: Ogun
- Time zone: UTC+1 (WAT)
- 3-digit postal code prefix: 112
- ISO 3166 code: NG.OG.AO

Gbalefa Peninsula is an area of land located south of Abeokuta and north of Lagos city. Gbalefa Peninsula was named after Akindele Gbalefa, the outstanding Owu warrior who led the Owu/Egba war against Ilobi, Ado-Odo and Dahomey.

== About Gbalefa Peninsula ==
The Owu contingent fought alongside the Egba in the Makun, Ilobi, and Ado-Odo wars between 1842 and 1845. The combined Owu–Egba forces defeated opposing groups at Itori, Yobo, Ifo, Atan, and Ota. From these positions, they later confronted forces from Dahomey, including the Dahomean Amazons. Two major Dahomean incursions into Egba territory were recorded during this period.

The first occurred on 3 March 1851 during the reign of King Ghezo. The Dahomean force was estimated at approximately 15,000 soldiers by Eugene Stock, Secretary of the Church Missionary Society. The Owu–Egba forces defended Abeokuta both within and beyond its city walls and successfully repelled the attack.

A second major attack took place in 1863 under King Glele, who sought to avenge the earlier defeat. Although intended as a surprise offensive, the plan was reportedly anticipated by the Owu–Egba alliance, which prepared defensive positions around the Gbalefa Peninsula near Abeokuta. Dahomean forces were subsequently engaged and defeated. Contemporary accounts describe significant casualties, with estimates exceeding 5,000, making it one of the more severe conflicts in the region during that period.

Notable figures in the conflicts include Lapeleke, Majeogbe, and Akinwale, described in oral traditions as prominent Owu war leaders. Lapeleke is associated with the establishment of a military base at Akinale, where Owu forces organized resistance efforts. Other individuals linked to these campaigns include Awaye Sonlu and Akindele Gbalefa.

In 1937, the colonial administration merged Ota and the Gbalefa Peninsula under the Egba Native Administration in present-day Ogun State, Nigeria.

A meeting was held on 10 April 1935 at the Olota's Palace in Ota involving the District Officer of Egba Division and representatives of Ota communities. The meeting followed a publication in the newspaper Akede Eko (30 March 1935) which claimed that the Gbalefa Peninsula belonged to the Awori. The purpose of the meeting was to examine the validity of this claim based on testimonies from local representatives.

Attendees included the District Officer, Capt. J. H. Scott, the Olota of Ota (Salami Oyede), and various chiefs and community representatives from Ota, Ilogbo, Atan, Obere, Onibuku, and Imojuba. The proceedings documented local perspectives on territorial claims in the area.

The minutes of the meeting were previously made available online, though the original link is no longer active.

== Land disputes ==
Since early 80s, there has been contention about the ownership of Ilobi and Ado-Odo area. While the Egba claim that Ota people were tenants accommodated by their forebears, having successfully displaced the Ilobi and Ado-Odo during Egba/Dahomey war, the Otta/Awori communities see themselves as original settlers in the area. This ownership disagreement has led to litigants to present their cases before High Court judges in Nigeria.

== Historical evidences ==
Historical records show that the Owu/Egba conquered the contested areas during the Ilobi, Ado-Odo and Dahomey wars of 1836 to 1853. It was documented that Henry Townsend, a British missionary, was present at the ceremonial takeover of the territory by Akindele Gbalefa, the Owu Warrior and head of the Egba allied forces. The Southern part of Gbalefa forest, as it was then called, formerly belonged to the Ados, while the Northern part belonged to the Ilobis. The forest was uninhabited at the time it was conquered.

Historical records also show that it was the Owu/Egba community who allocated farming lands to Ota natives. The Owu/Egba argued that the contested area originally belonged to Ado and Ilobi, and not to Ota, before the conquest. And in a letter written to the then-resident officer of the Abeokuta District by the District Officer of Egba Division entitled "Reorganisation of Ota District", and signed by F.V.O Aribusola in 1937, the District Officer stated that:

In accordance with your instructions ED/321/106, I proceed to Ota where I met representatives of the Egbas in the District-the heir at law. They were apprised of the new reorganizations which will merge their areas-Gbalefa peninsula and Ota together under the Egba Native Administration. I explained the difficulties being experienced by the officials in the administration of the areas at the moment.

== Court judgement ==
=== High Court ===
On 18 November 2005 at the High Court of Justice, in the Ota Judicial Division, Ogun State under Justice. H. O. Solanke, the Owu/Egba community was awarded N50,000 and the defendants restrained from committing any further acts of trespass on the said land. In April 2010, the Abeokuta High Court dismissed the ownership claim by the Ota community.

=== Appeals Court ===
In the 1993 Appeal Court judgment at Ibadan delivered by Hon. Justice Owolabi Kolawole in the appeal suit CA/1/129/90. The panel of jurors submitted that "The motion to file and argue additional grounds of appeal can therefore, not be tied to nothing. The motion is dismissed and the appeal is also dismissed as being incomplete with N400 cost to the 1st to 4th respondents."

In April 2010, the latest in the series of legal crossfire in between the two claimants is the subsisting Appeal Court judgment which dismissed the ownership claim by the Ota community. This followed the earlier ruling on the same matter by the Abeokuta High Court.

== Coronet Obas (Kings) ==
In March 2006, The Olowu of Owu, Oba (King) Dr. Olusanya Adegboyega Dosunmu II (Amuroro ruling house) started the appointment of 16 coronets within Owu Kingdom. The appointment/installation of the coronets was met with strong opposition from the Olota of Ota, Oba Alani Osanyintola Oyede who claimed that Oba Olowu of Owu illegally encroached on his territory. The following are the names of the coronet Obas (kings) and their domain:

- Oba Rasheed Adeosun – The Alaga of Aga Olowo
- Oba L.K. Ogunseye – The Onijoko of Ijoko
- Oba Olatunji Oluyomi – The Alatan of Atan-Gbalefa Land
- Oba Edward Fasina – The Alabalabi of Abalabi
- Oba Olufemi Ogunleye – The Towulade of Akinade
- Oba Salisu Abiodun – The Olojodu of Ojodu
- Oba Semiu Sodipo – The Onijagunna of Jagunna
- Oba Isaac Ojelade – The Onibogun of Ibogunlan
- Oba O.O. Akinyemi – The Onifo of Ifo
- Oba B. Osuntogun – The Oniwasinmi of Wasinmi
- Oba Oluwagboun Adebayo – The Onisango of Sango
- Oba Yunusa A. Akinmade – The Olu of Onigbedu
- Oba Fatai Oladipo – The Onilepa of Ilepa
- Oba Alao O. Tepede – The Onikoka of Coker
- Oba Oluwagbemileke A. Babajide – The Alaigbajo of Arigbajo
- Oba Jimoh Famuyiwa – The Onipapa of Papalanto

== Community violence ==
Besides the continued engagement of Owu/Egba community in litigations by the Ota community, there has been reports of unprovoked attacks by people on both sides on their opponents. Lives and livelihoods have been lost. Judgments rendered by the courts have not decreased the incidence of violence in the area.

== In the press ==
July 6, 2010. According to News Star news publication the Olori Igbimo of Owu Kingdom, High Chief Olufemi Sodeinde said the Awori community in Ota have continued to attack the Gbalefa community in an attempt to subdue its people. "What we expect them to do is to go back to court, if they know they have genuine claim to the land. But they will not. What they want to do is to precipitate a crisis."
