= Atan Ota =

Town in Ogun State, Nigeria

- Town
- Location in Nigeria
- Coordinates: 6°46′00″N 2°48′00″E
- Country: Nigeria
- State: Ogun
- Local Government Area: Ado-Odo/Ota

Atan Ota (Also Atan Otta) is a frontline town located in the Ado-Odo/Ota Local Government Area which is one of the 19 Local Government Areas of Ogun State in southwest Nigeria. It is situated at 6°46'0"N 2°47'60"E and is 575 kilometres (357 mi) west of Abuja and 62 km (39 mi) northeast of Cotonou. The town is brimming with some 300,000 residents. It lies right on the international route linking Nigeria with the Republic of Benin and directly west of Sango Otta township. A hub of business activities. Most of the residents are traders who sell foodstuff, provision, and poultry food. The population of the settlement keeps increasing constantly as more and more people move out from Lagos to build residential blocks in the booming suburb.

The king of Atan Ota Oba Solomon Oyedele(Isiyemi 1) joined his ancestors on March 18th, 2018 at the age of 96. The town has a public primary school named Nawair-ud-deen primary school (N.U.D) whose field serves as a stadium for the people of Atan Ota and also a Public secondary school known as Local Government Secondary commercial school. The town also has many private schools. It also prides itself of a primary health centre as well as a booming market which is currently being upgraded to an ultramodern market which is opened every four days.

== History ==
The Ado-Odo/Ota local government area as a whole is predominantly Awori by native population, however there are also pockets of Egba populations in Sango Otta, Ijoko and Atan, while the Yewas or Egbados and the Eguns can be found in the Ado Odo area. Apart from the native population, there are people from all over Nigeria living peacefully in the vicinity.

== Geography ==
Atan Otta is bounded by the Lagos State local governments of Ojo and Badagry in the south, and Alimosho in the east. Yewa South and Ifo Local Governments in the north and Ipokia Local Government in the west.
