= Yorubaland =

Cultural region of the Yoruba people in West Africa

Yorubaland Ilẹ̀ Yorùbá
- Cultural region
- Unofficial flag of the Yoruba people
- Nickname(s): Ilẹ̀ Káàárọ̀-Oòjíire, Ilẹ̀ Odùduwà
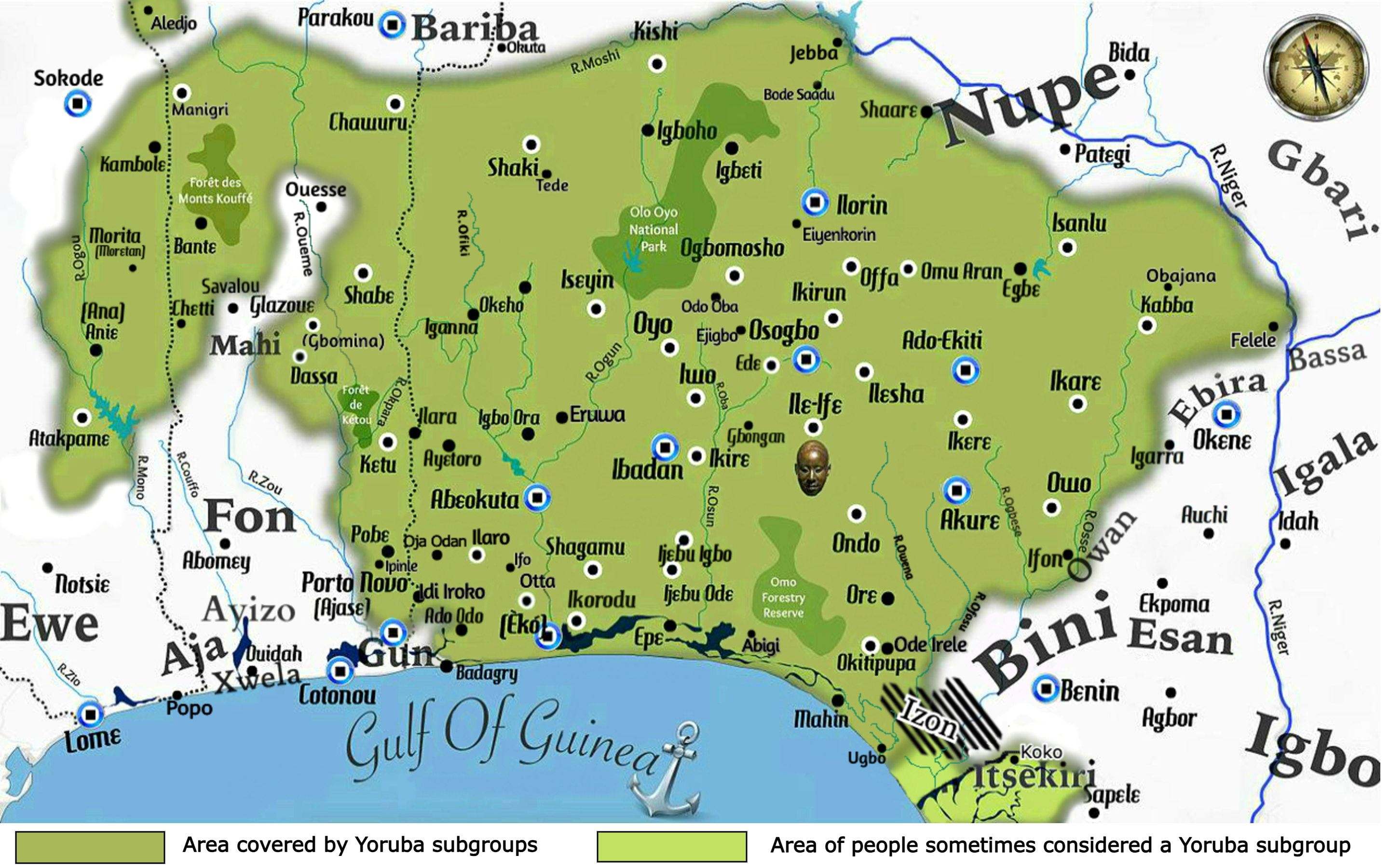
- Location of Yoruba subgroups (green) in West Africa (white)
- Part of: Nigeria (South West and parts of North Central); Benin (south-central & southeast Benin); Togo (east-central Togo)
- Earliest dated Ifẹ̀ artefact: 500 BC
- Ifẹ Empire: 11th century
- Oyo Empire: 1300
- British colony: 1862
- German protectorate (German Togoland, present-day Togo): 1884
- French colony (Dahomey, present-day Benin): 1904
- Nigeria: 1914
- Founder: Proto-Yoruba and Proto-Edekiri speaking peoples
- Regional capital: •Ìbàdàn (Political) •Ilé-Ifẹ̀ (Cultural/spiritual) •Èkó (Economic)
- Former seat: • Ọ̀yọ́-Ilé (Old capital of the Oyo Empire)
- Composed of: List: NIGERIA Ekiti State; Kogi State partly; Kwara State partly; Lagos State; Ogun State; Ondo State; Osun State; Oyo State __________; BENIN Ouémé partly; Plateau; Collines partly; Donga partly; Borgu partly __________; TOGO Plateaux partly; Centrale partly

Government
  - Type: Monarchies • Ọba (King) • Ògbóni (Legislature) • Olóye (Chiefs) __________ • Balógun (Generalissimo) __________ • Baálẹ̀ (Village/Regional heads in the West) • Ọlọ́jà (Village/Regional heads in the East)

Area
  - Total: 181,300 km^{2} (70,000 sq mi)
- Highest elevation: 1,055 m (3,461 ft)
- Lowest elevation: −0.2 m (−0.66 ft)

Population (2015 estimate)
  - Total: ~ 55 million
  - Density: 387/km^{2} (1,000/sq mi)
- In Nigeria, Benin and Togo

Demographics
  - Language: Yoruba, Yoruboid languages
  - Religion: Christianity, Islam, Ìṣẹ̀ṣè
- Time zone: WAT (Nigeria, Benin), GMT (Togo)

- Person: Ọmọ Yorùbá
- People: Ìran Yorùbá
- Language: Èdè Yorùbá
- Country: Ilẹ̀ Yorùbá

Yorubaland (Yoruba: Ilẹ̀ Káàárọ̀-Oòjíire) is the homeland and cultural region of the Yoruba people in West Africa. It spans the modern-day countries of Nigeria, Benin and Togo, and covers a total land area of 142,114 km^{2} (54,871 sq mi). Of this land area, 106,016 km^{2} (74.6%) lies within Nigeria, 18.9% in Benin, and the remaining 6.5% is in Togo. Prior to European colonization, this area consisted of multiple states, including most prominently the Ọyọ Empire, Ifẹ Empire and Ijẹbu Kingdom. The geo-cultural space contains an estimated 55 million people, the majority of this population being ethnic Yoruba.

== Geography ==
Geophysically, Yorubaland spreads north from the Gulf of Guinea and west from the Niger River into Benin and Togo. In the northern section, Yorubaland begins in the suburbs just west of Lokoja and continues unbroken up to the Ogooué River tributary of the Mono River in Togo, a distance of around 610 km. In the south, it begins in an area just west of the Benin and Osse (Ovia) river occupied by the Ilaje Yorubas and continues uninterrupted up to Porto-Novo, a total distance of about 280 km as the crow flies. West of Porto-Novo Gbe speakers begin to predominate. The northern section is thus more expansive than the southern coastal section.

The land is characterized by mangrove forests, estuaries and coastal plains in the south, which rise steadily northwards into rolling hills and a jagged highland region in the interior, commonly known as the Yorubaland plateau or Western upland. The highlands are pronounced in the Ekiti area of the region, especially around the Effon ridge and the Okemesi fold belt, which have heights in excess of 732 m (2,400 ft) and are characterized by numerous waterfalls and springs such as Olumirin waterfall, Arinta waterfall, and Effon waterfall. The highest elevation is found at the Idanre Inselberg Hills, the tallest geographical feature in the western half of Nigeria, with heights in excess of 1,050 metres (3,440 ft). In general, the landscape of the interior is made up of undulating terrain with occasional inselbergs jutting out dramatically from the surrounding expanse. Some include: Okeagbe hills: 790m, Olosunta in Ikere Ekiti: 690m, Saki and Igbeti hills.

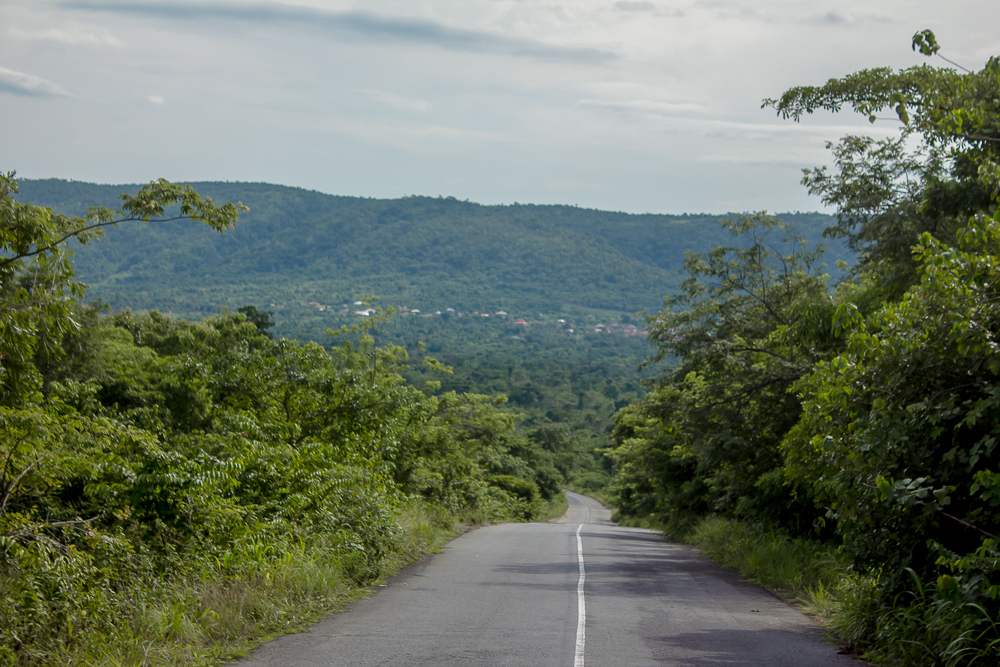
Hill forest near Ikogosi

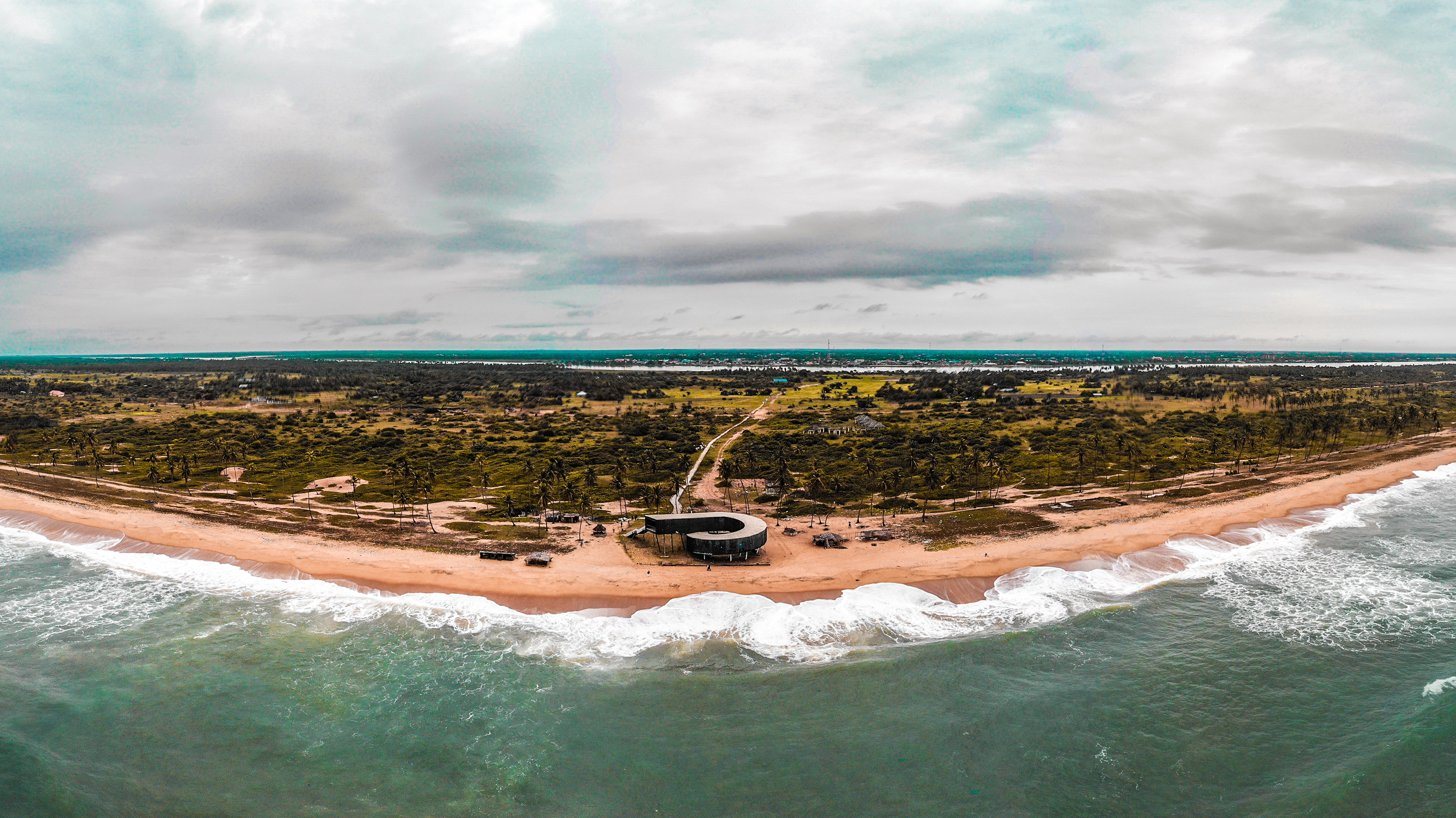
Sandy coastline near Badagry

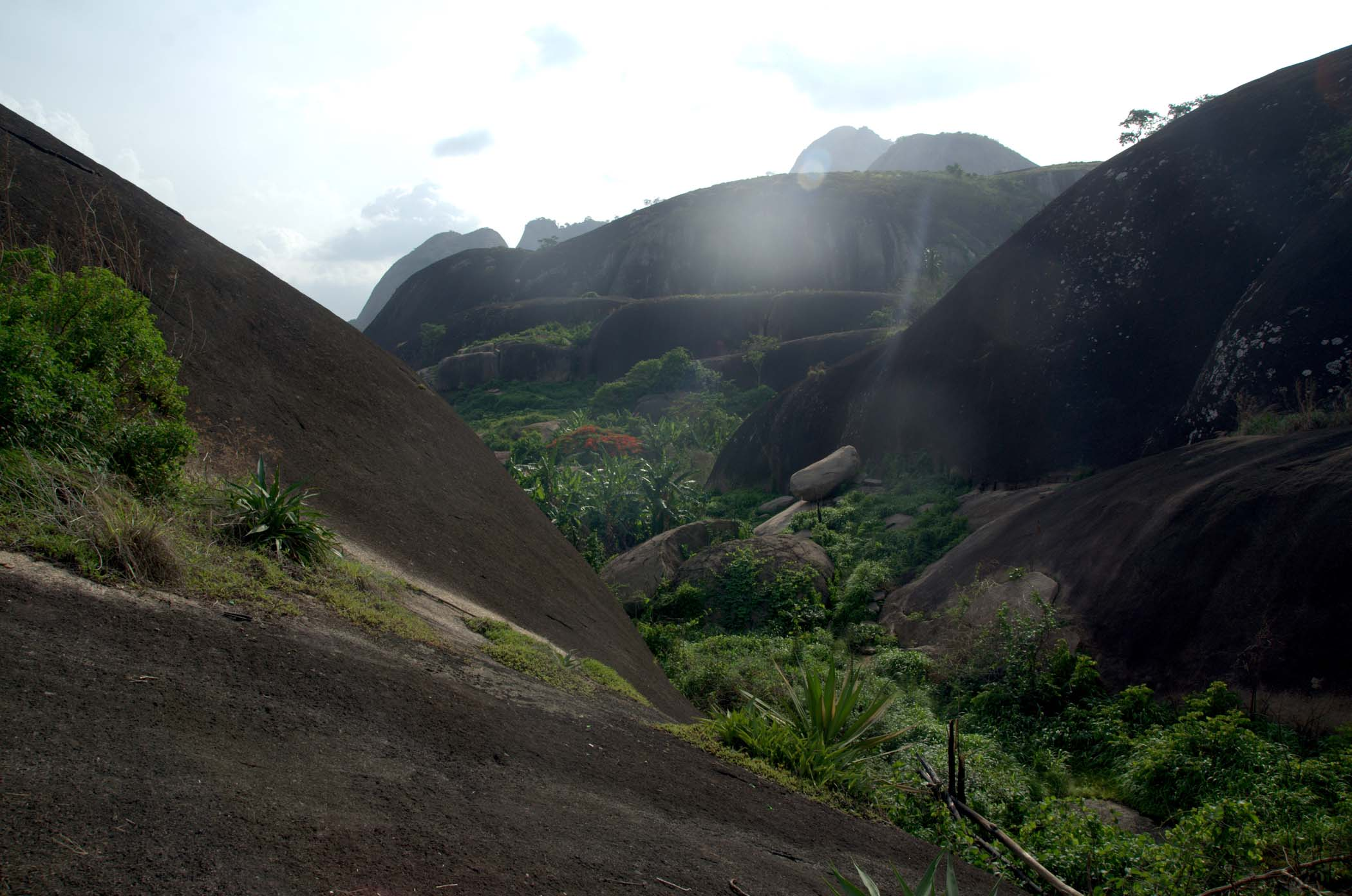
The granite outcrops at Idanre

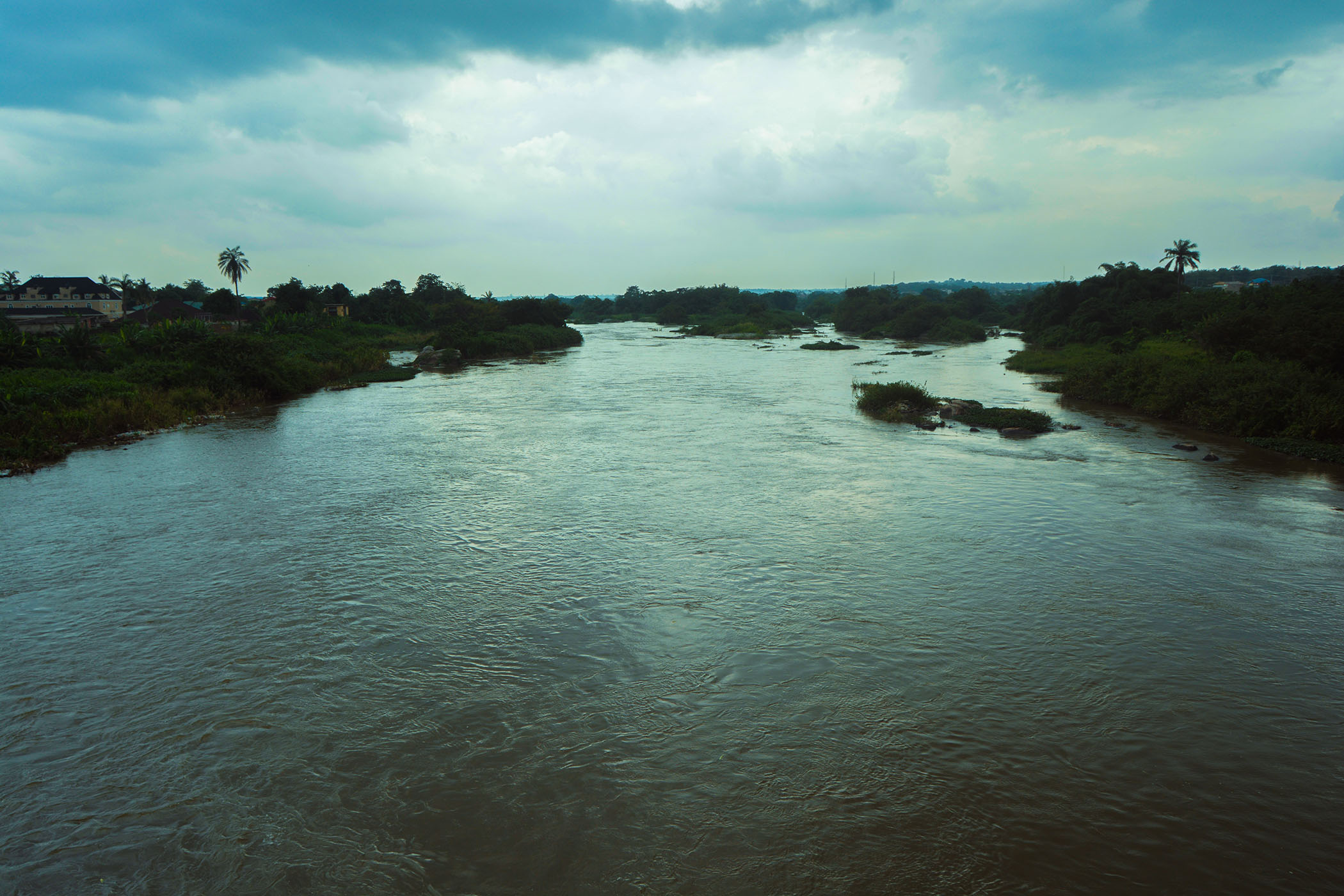
View of The Ogun River

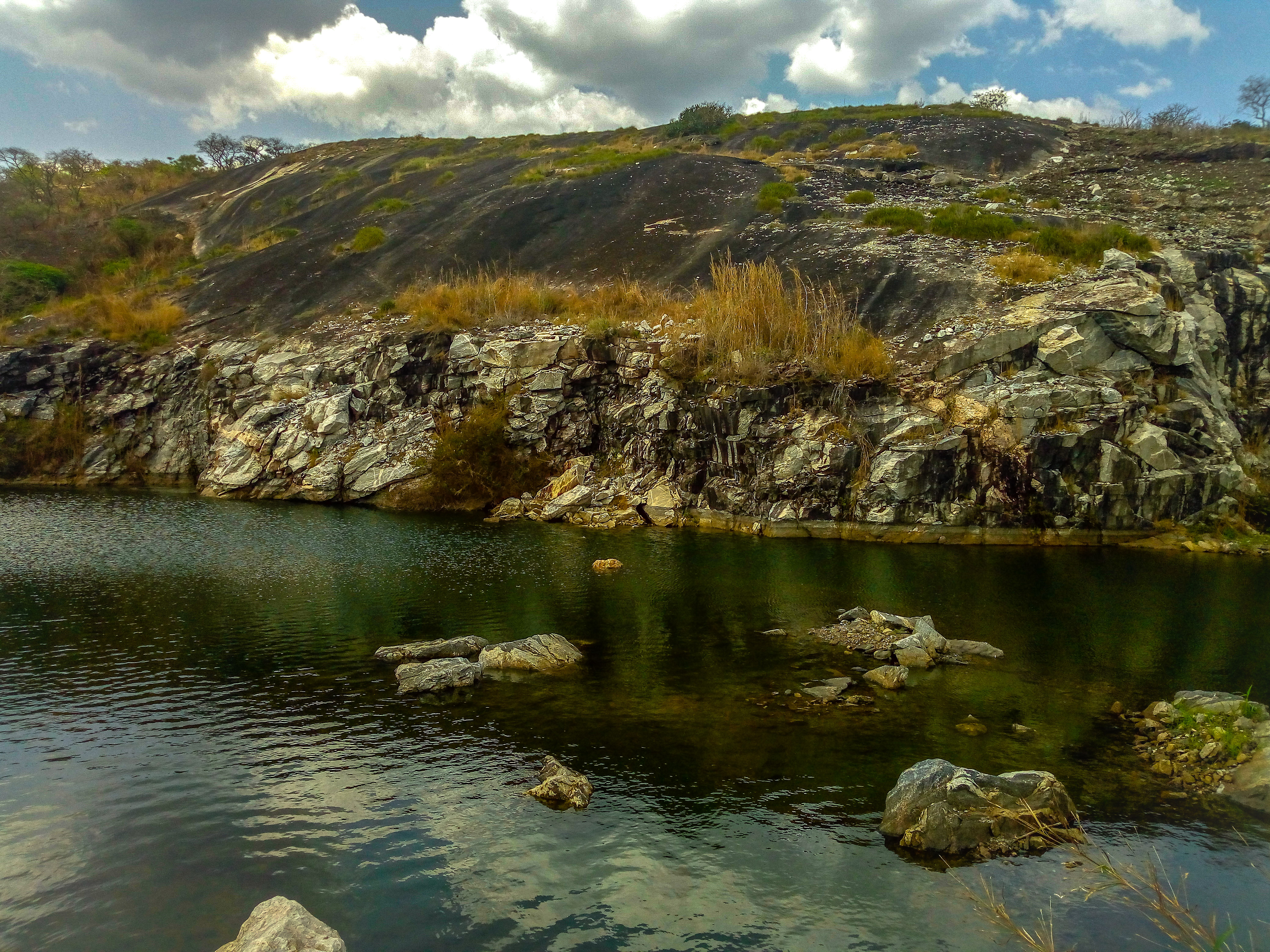
A hill lake near Ikole, Ekiti

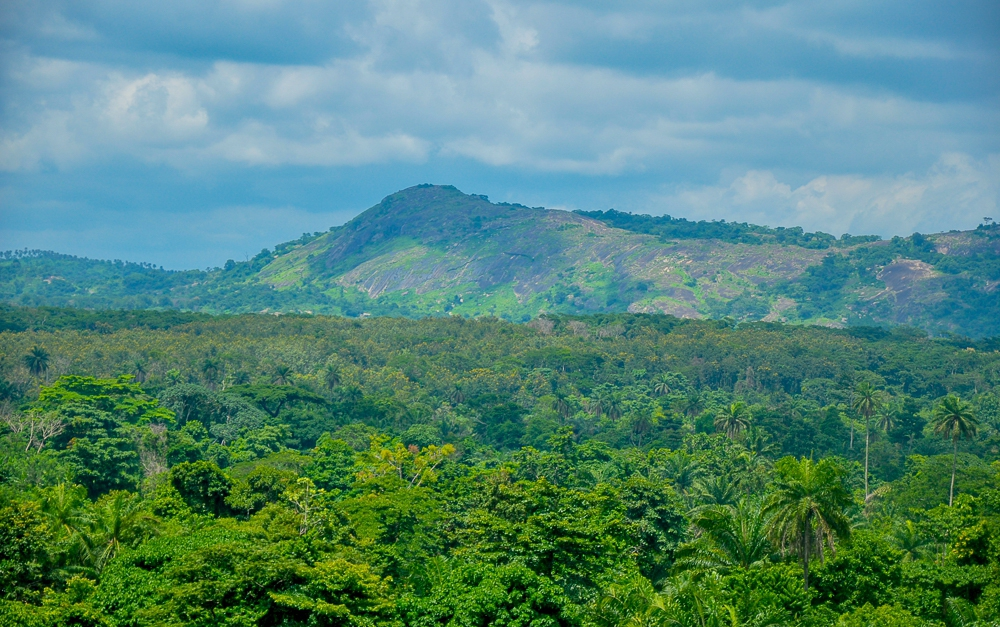
Interior of central Yorubaland in the wet season

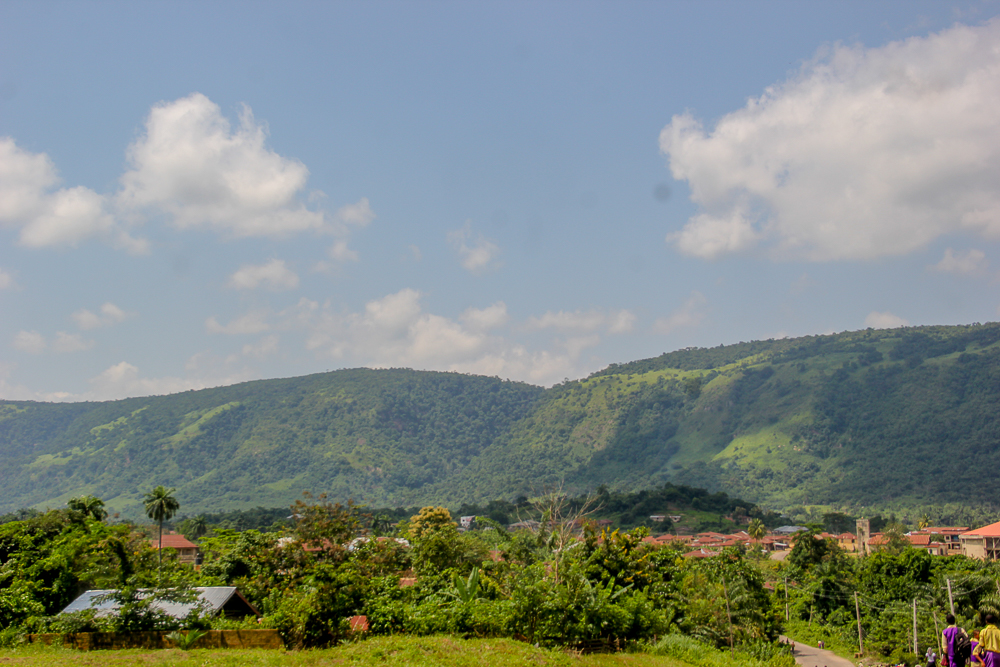
Section of Efon ridge, part of the Okemesi fold belt

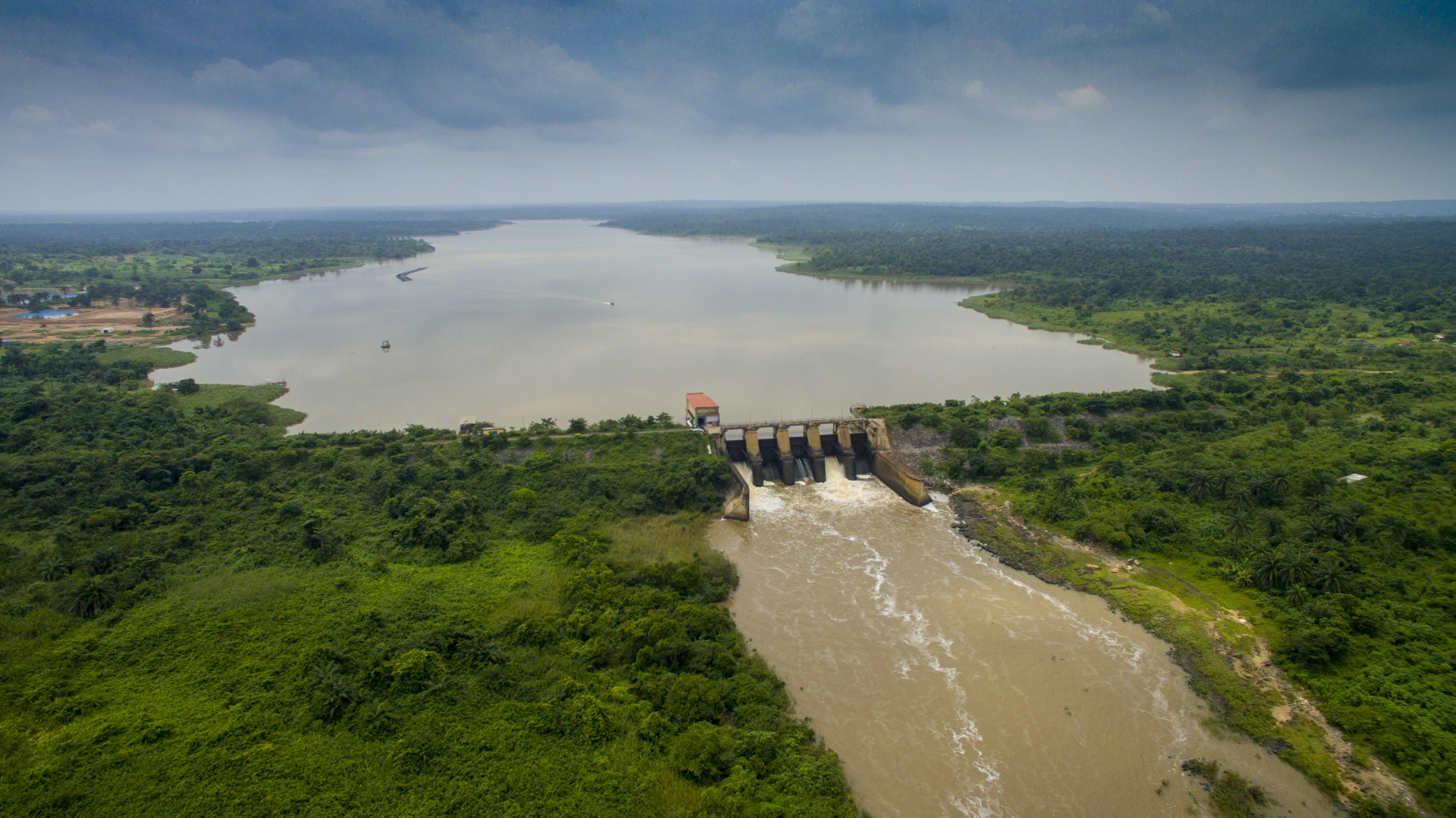
Asejire Reservoir on the Osun river

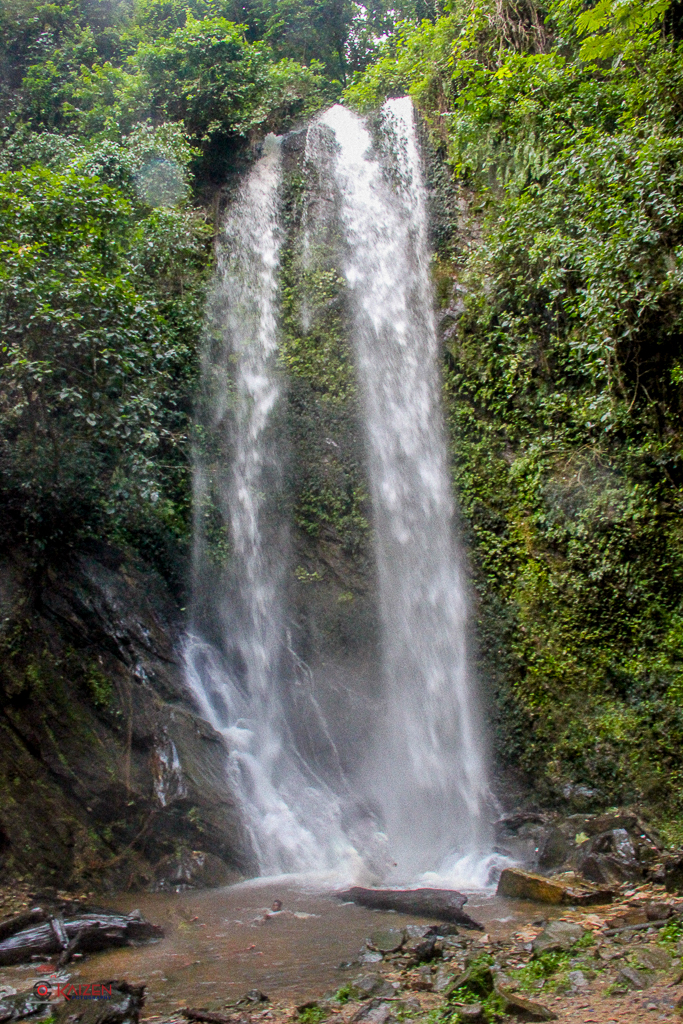
Erin-Ijesha Waterfalls

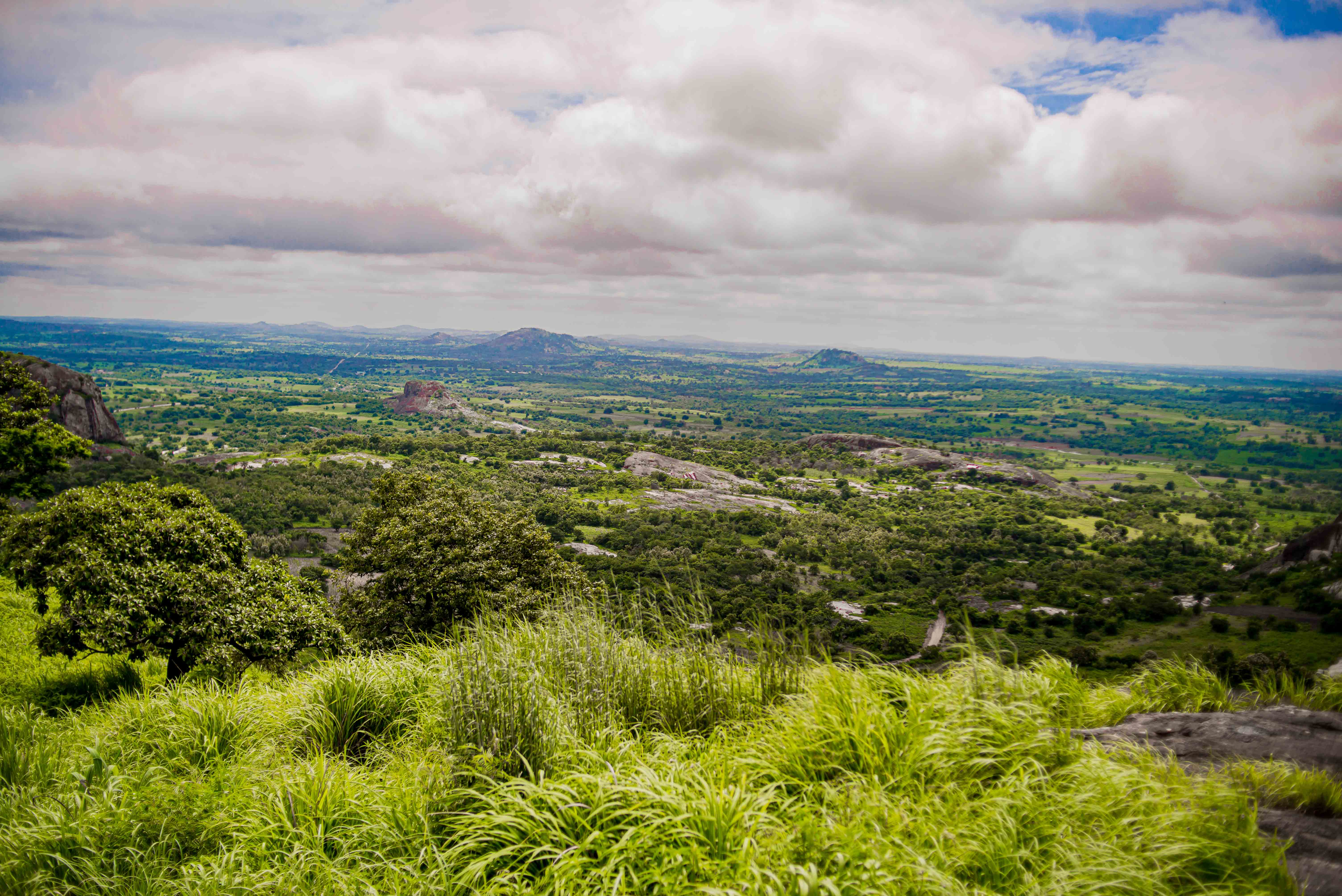
Open savanna landscape near Ado-Awaye

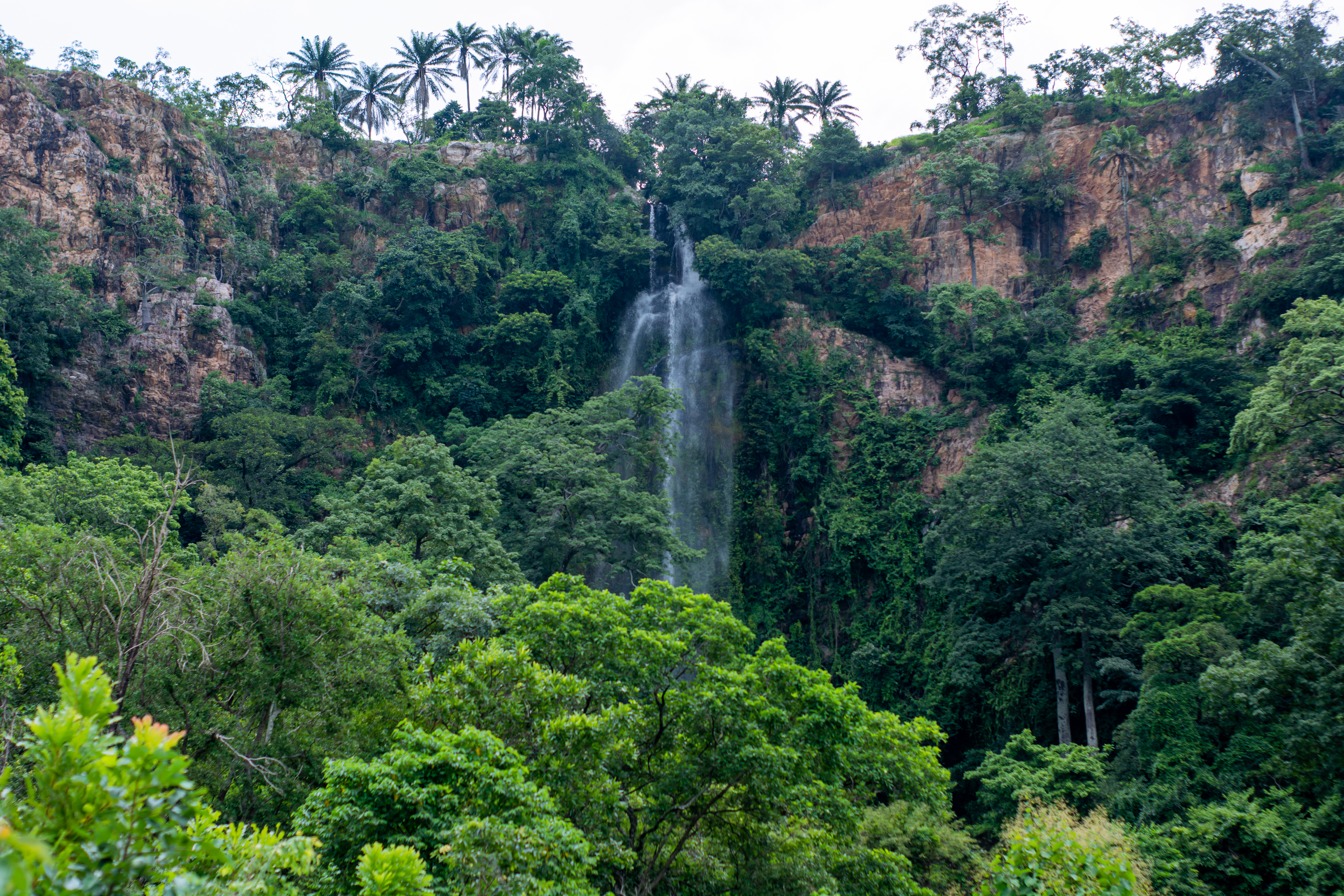
View up the Owu Waterfalls, Ifelodun, Kwara

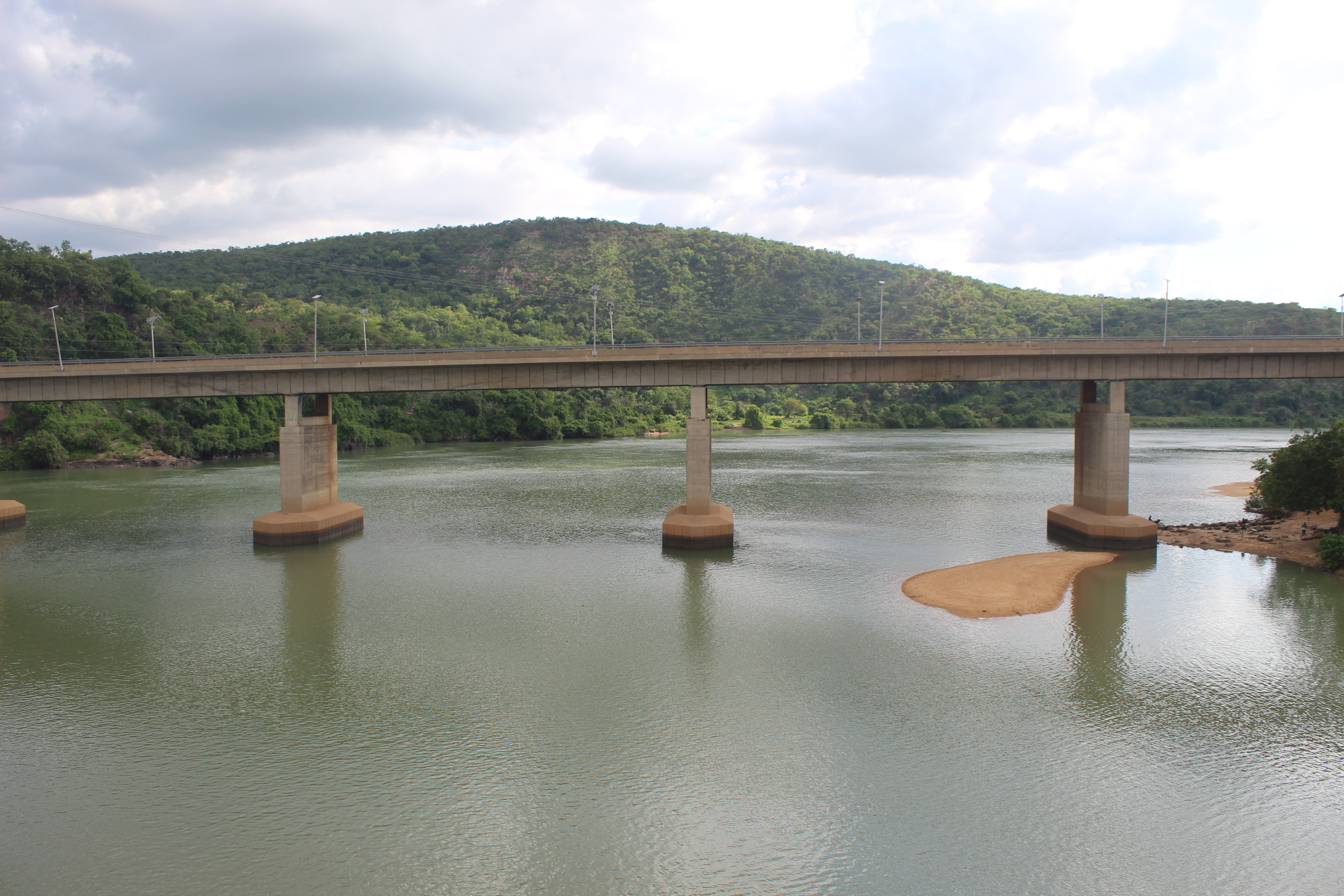
View of a Niger River tributary at Jebba

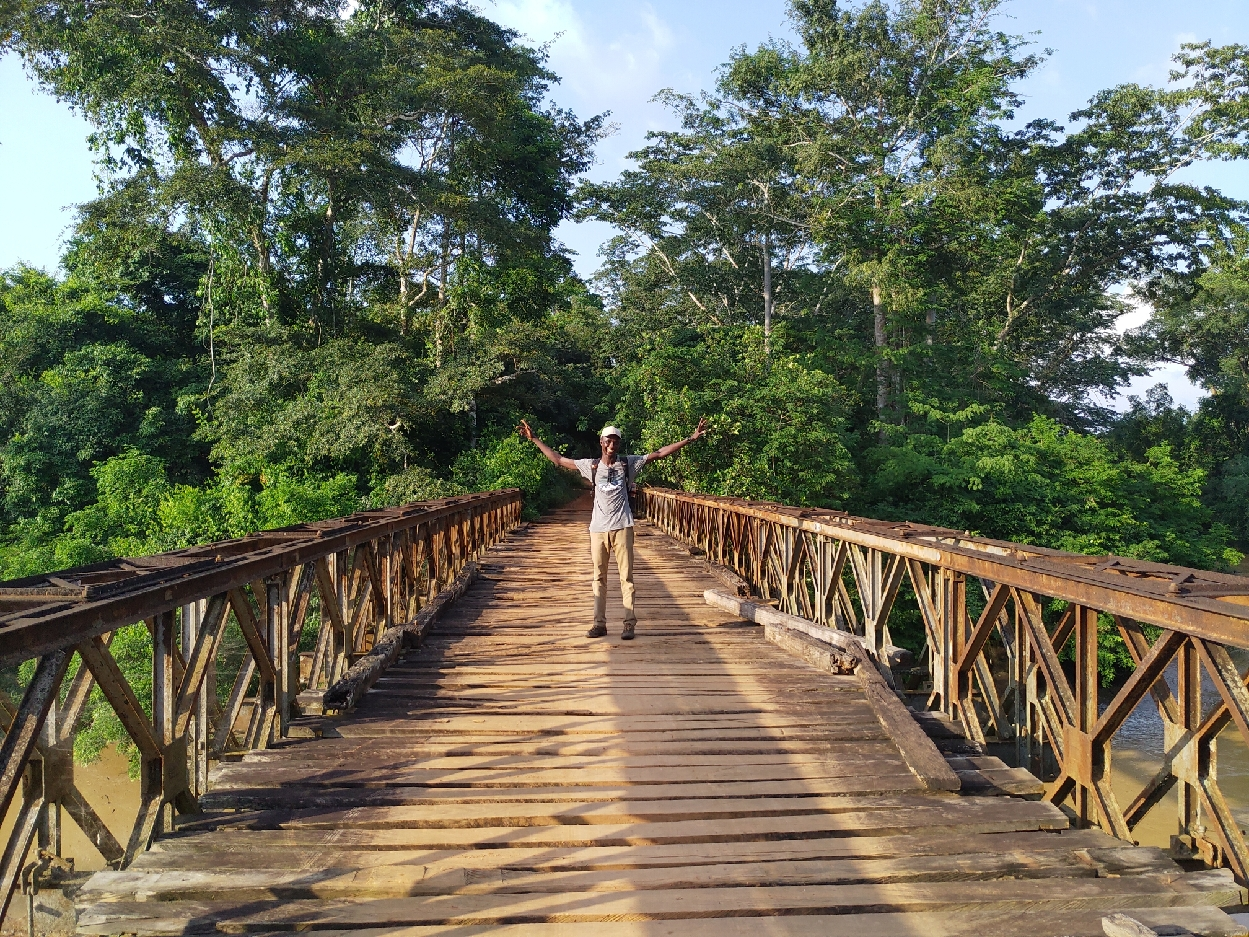
Close tree canopy in the Omo forest
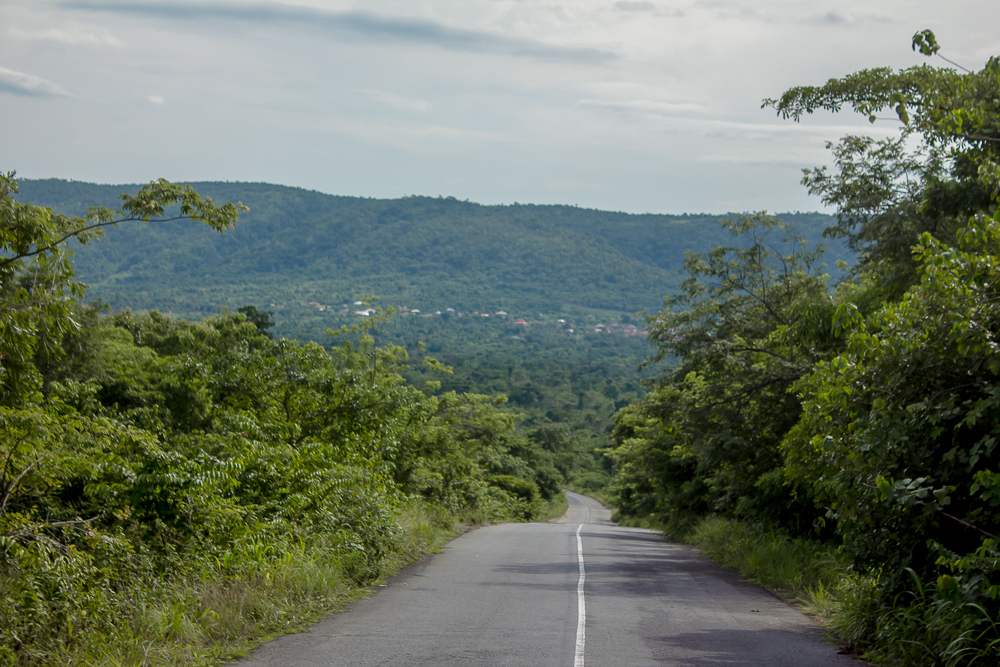
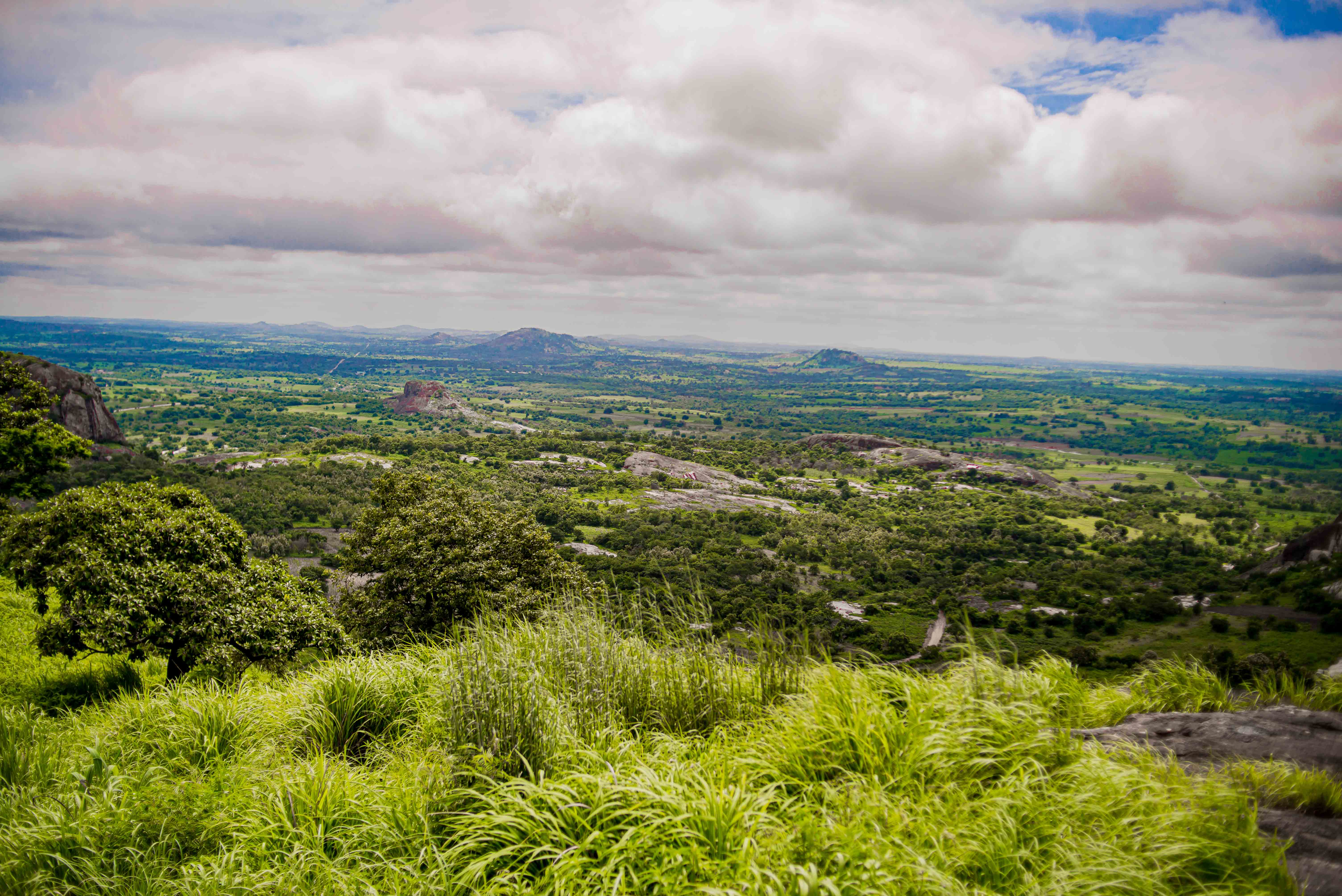
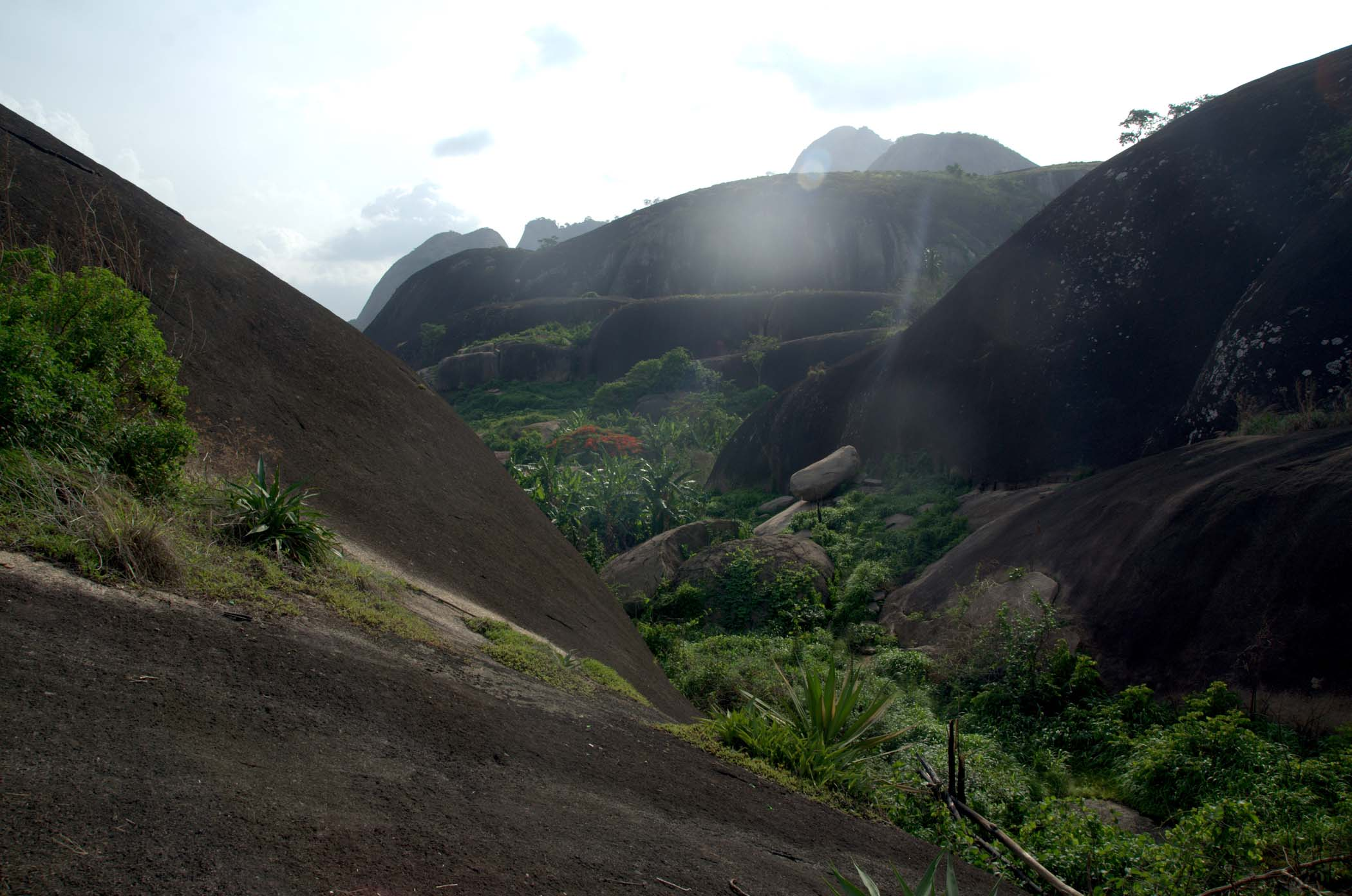
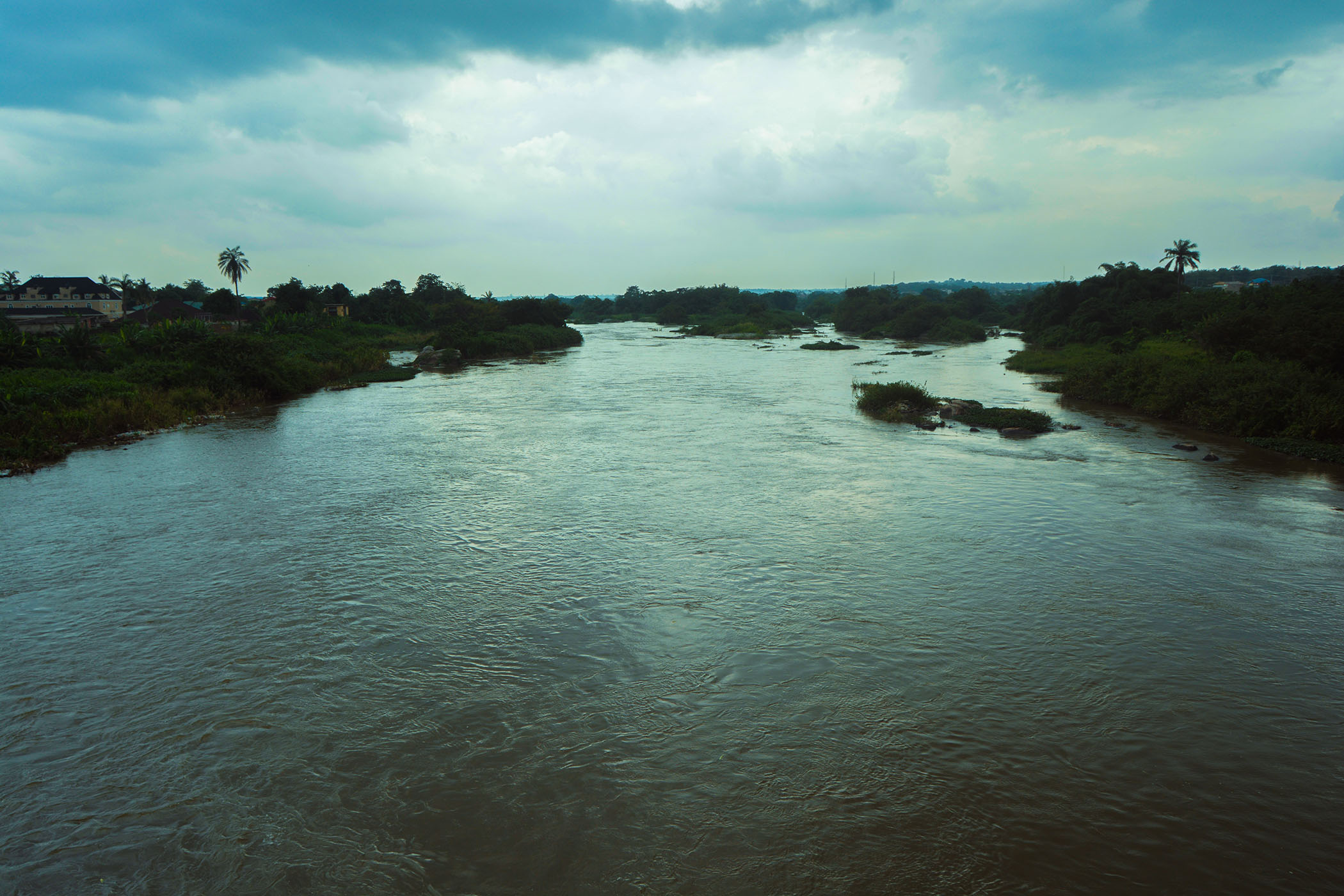
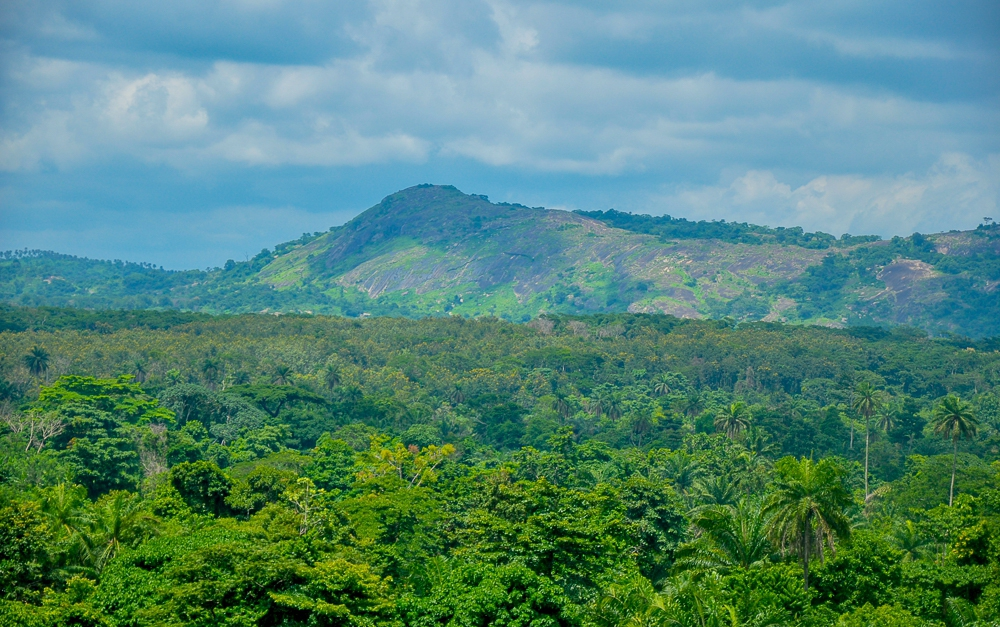
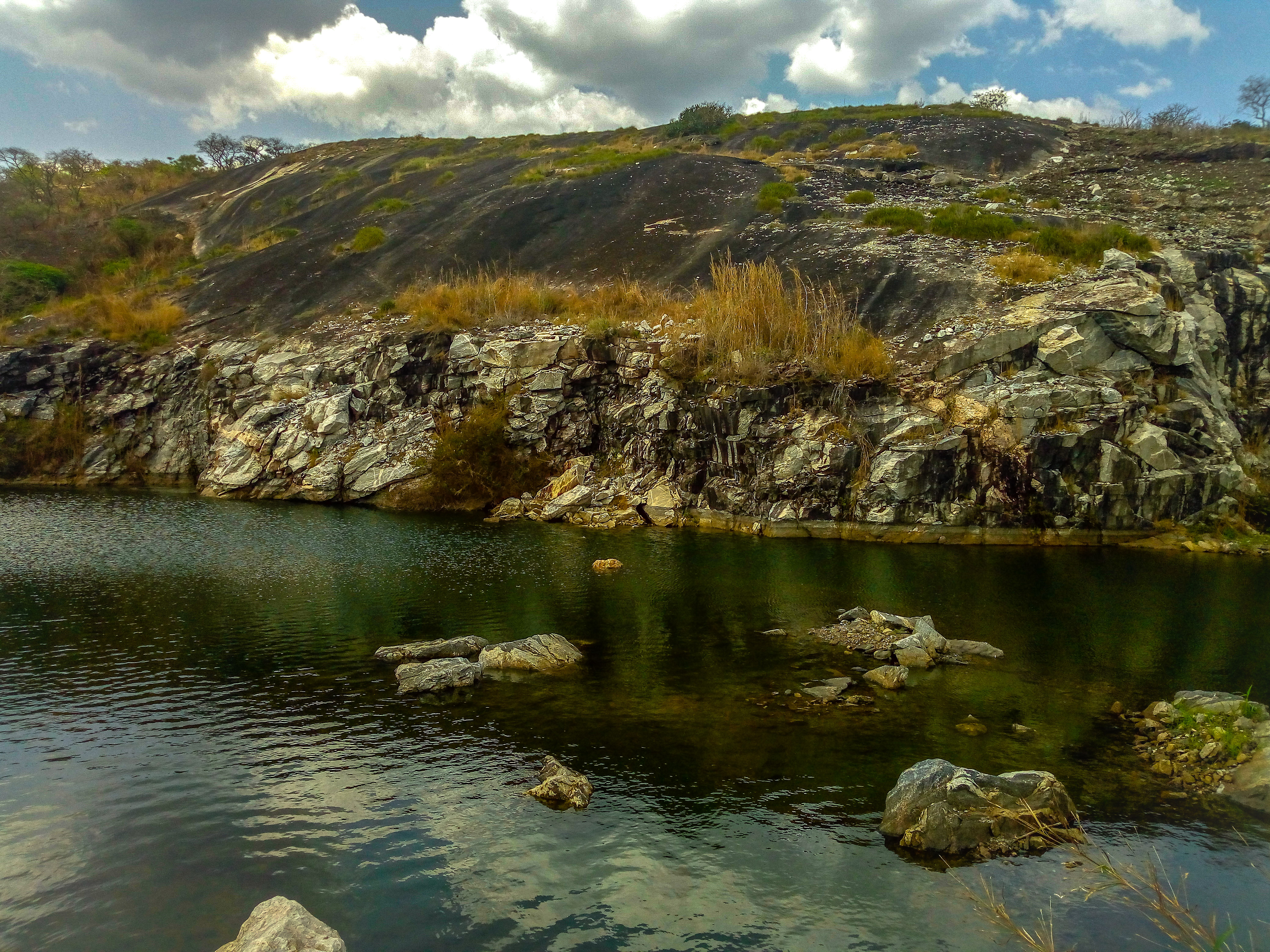
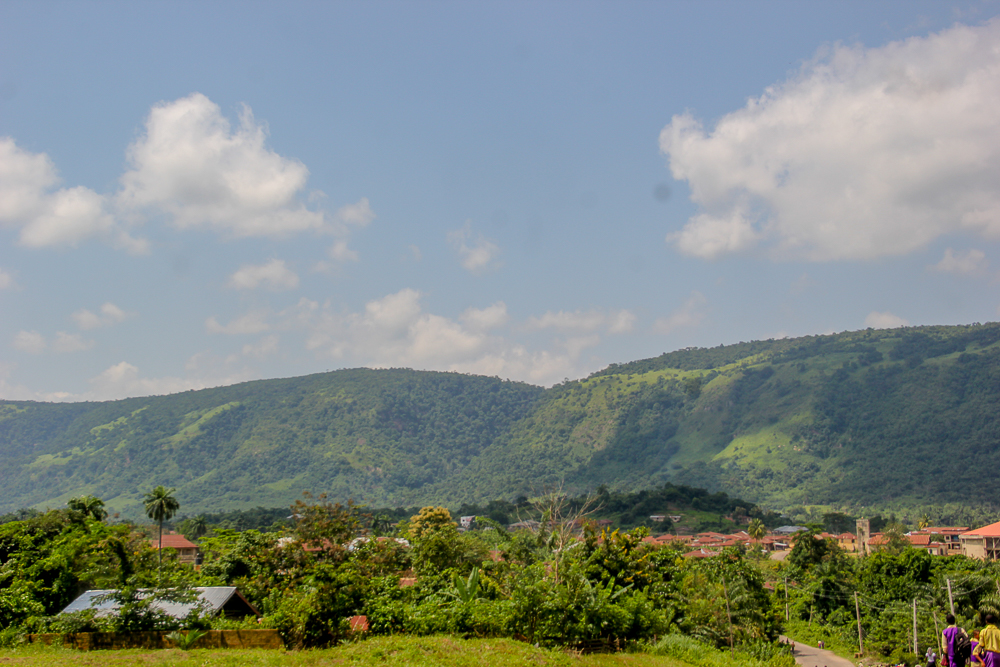
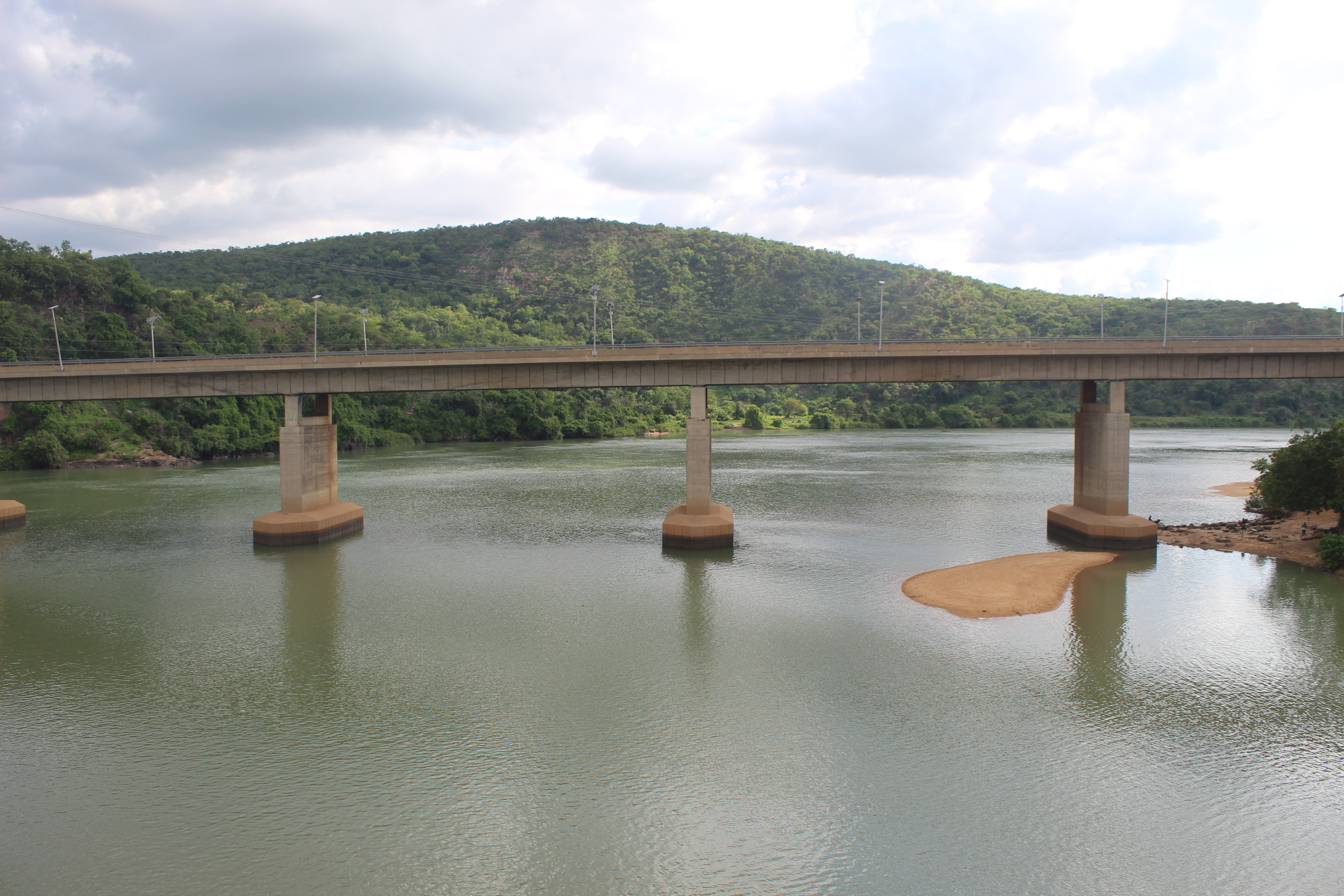
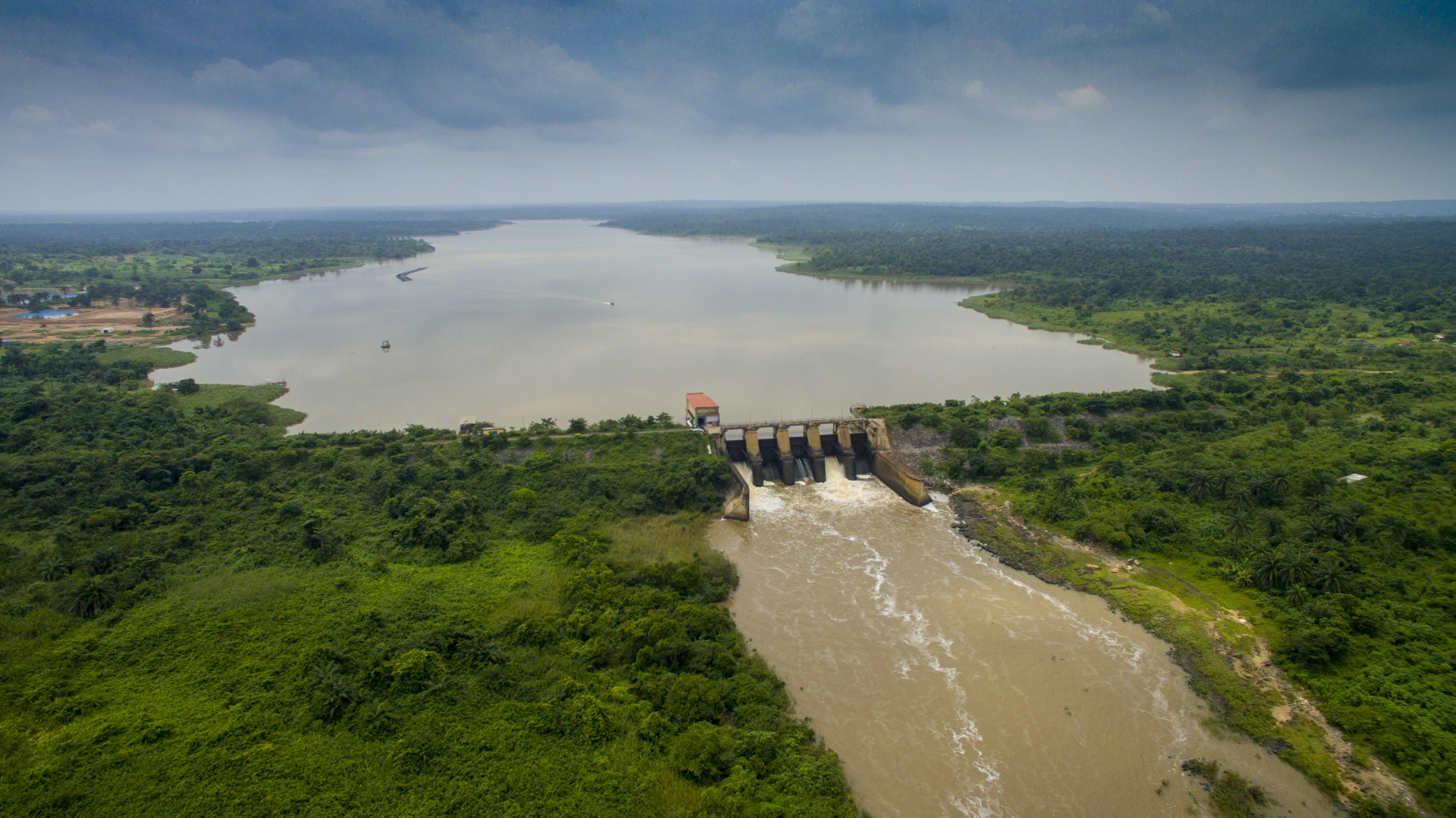
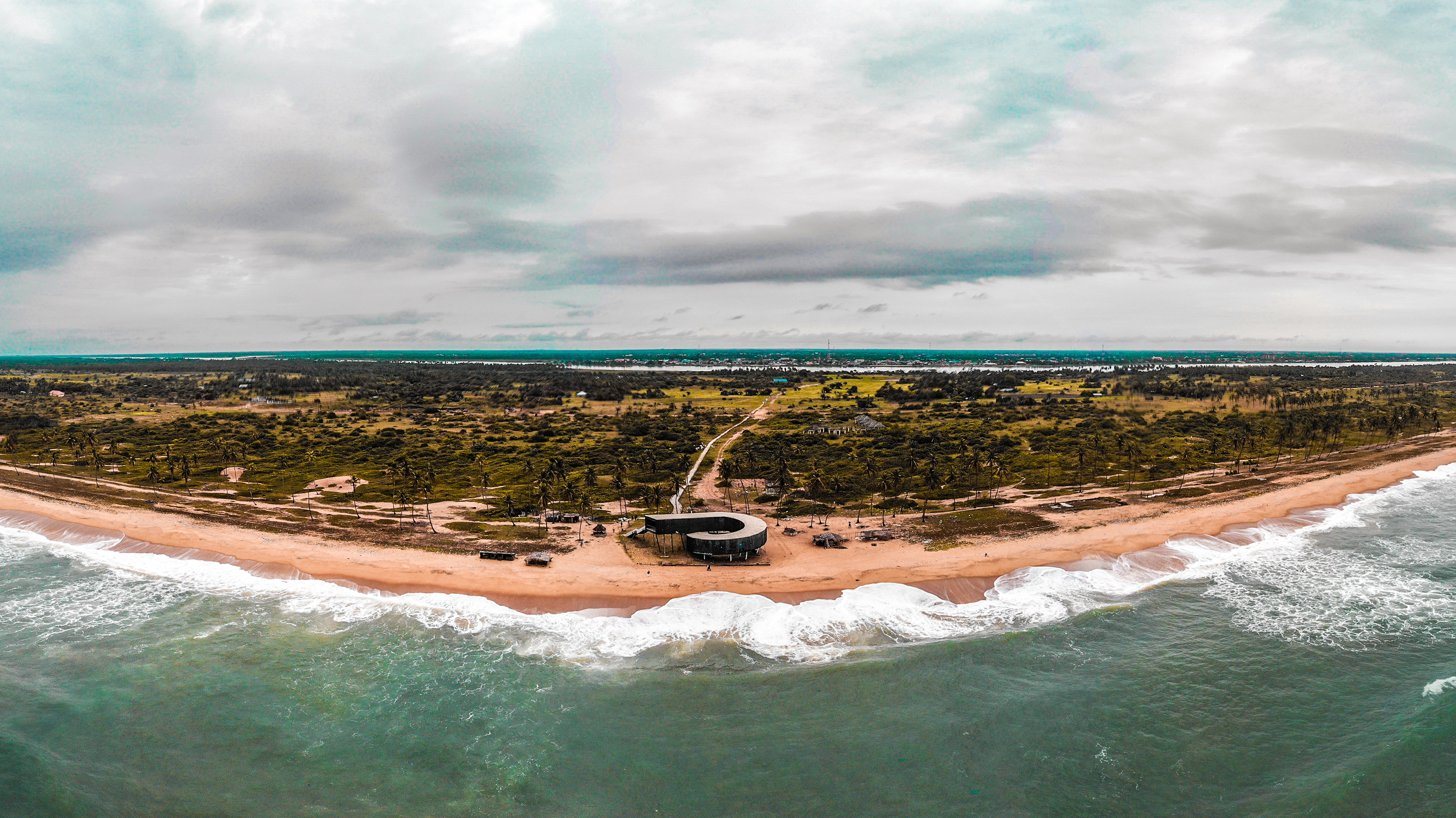
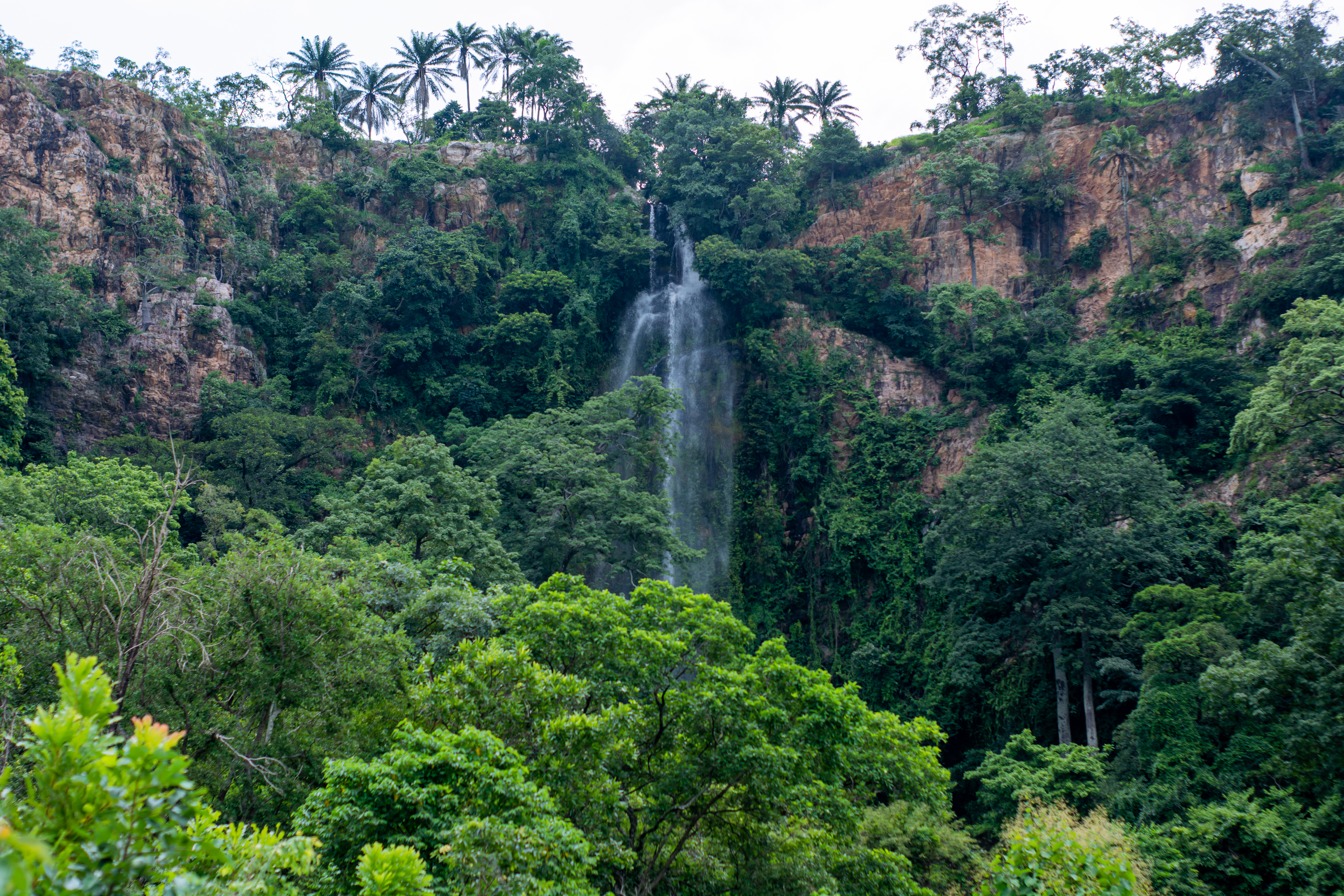
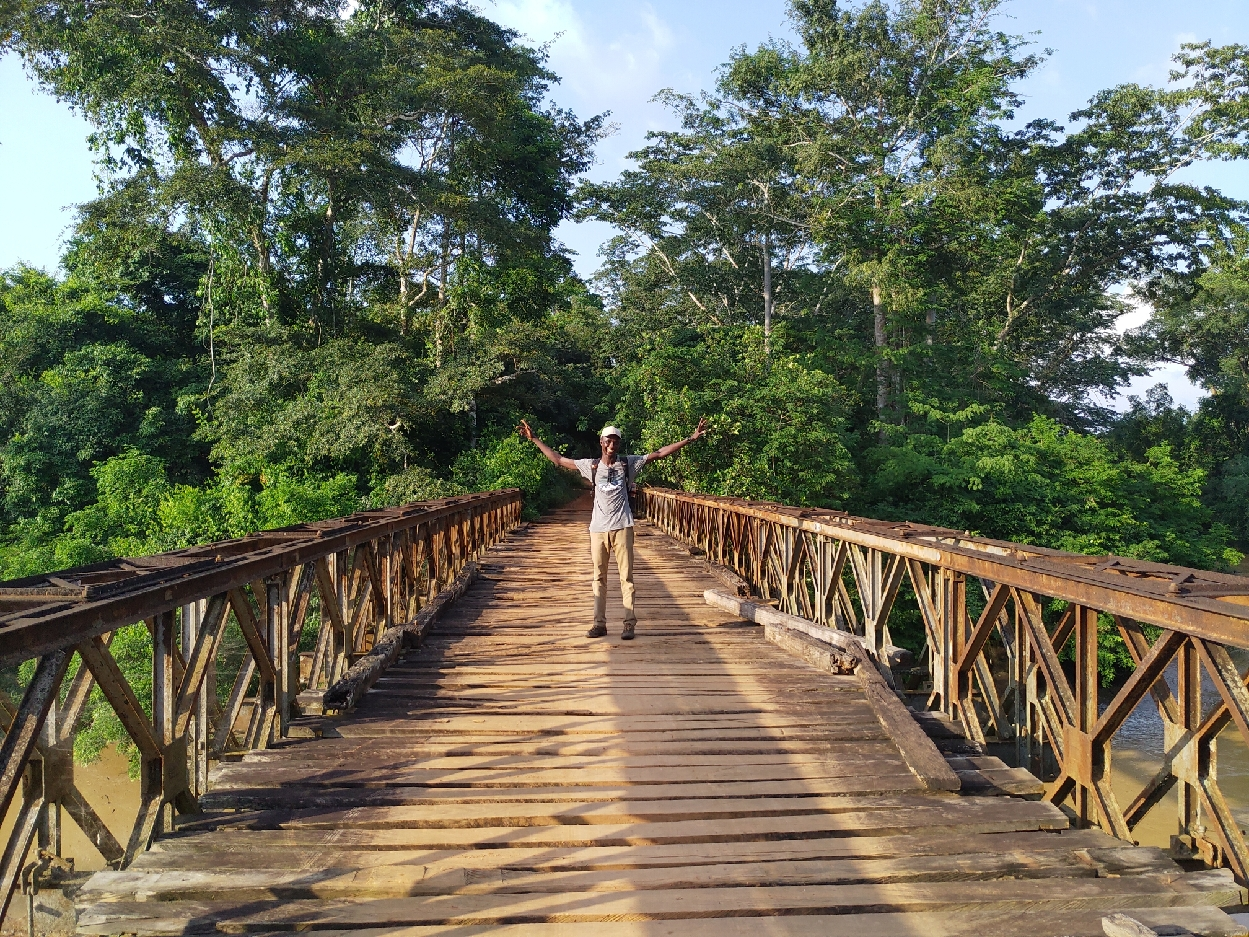

Map of Yoruba country, 1862

=== Rivers ===
With coastal plains, southern lowlands, and interior highlands, Yorubaland has several large rivers and streams that crisscross the terrain. These rivers flow in two general directions within the Yoruba country; southwards into the lagoons, estuaries and creeks which empty into the Atlantic Ocean, and northwards into the Niger river. Some southward flowing rivers include; The Osun and Shasha rivers which empty into the Lekki Lagoon, the Ogun River and its major tributaries; the Oyan and Ofiki which empties into the Lagos Lagoon, the upper Mono River, Oba River, Erinle River, Yewa River which discharges into the Badagry creek, Okpara River which forms part of the Nigeria-Benin border before fully re-entering Benin to join the Ouémé River (Ofe in Yoruba) which drains into Lake Nokoué and the Porto-Novo creek. On the eastern flank, the Owena (Siluko), Ofosu and Osse rivers empty into the Benin river creek. Those which flow in a northerly direction into the Niger include the Moshi river, Oyun, Oshin, Awun, Asa, Ero, Lawiri, and Oyi.

=== Subnational divisions ===
The Nigerian part of Yorubaland comprises today's Ọyọ, Ọṣun, Ogun, Kwara, Ondo, Ekiti, Lagos and western part of Kogi. The Beninese portion consists of Ouémé Department, Plateau Department, Collines Department, Tchaourou commune of Borgou Department, Bassila commune of Donga Department, Ouinhi and Zogbodomey commune of Zou Department, and Kandi commune of Alibori Department. The Togolese portions are the Ogou, Anié and Est-Mono prefectures in Plateaux Region, and the Tchamba prefecture in Centrale Region.

=== Vegetation and climate ===
The climate of Yorubaland varies from north to south. The southern, central and eastern portions of the territory is tropical high forest, known as the Yoruba lowland forests ecoregion. The characteristic vegetation is verdant closed-canopy forests composed of many varieties of hardwood trees including Milicia excelsa which is more commonly known locally as iroko, Antiaris africana, Terminalia superba which is known locally as afara, Entandrophragma or sapele, Lophira alata, Triplochiton scleroxylon (or obeche), Khaya grandifoliola (or African mahogany), Symphonia globulifera, and numerous other species. Some non-native species such as Tectona grandis (teak) and Gmelina arborea (pulp wood) have been introduced into the ecosystem and are being extensively grown in several large forest plantations.

The coastal section of this area features an area covered by swamp flats and dominated by plants such as mangroves and other stilt plants as well as palms, ferns and coconut trees on the beaches. This portion includes most of Ondo, Ekiti, Ogun, Osun, Lagos states and is characterised by generally high levels of precipitation defined by a double maxima (peak period); March–July and September–November. Annual rainfall in Ijebu Ode in the middle of Ogun state, for example, averages 2,020 millimetres or 80 inches. The area is the center of thriving cocoa, natural rubber, kola nut and oil palm production industry, as well as lucrative logging. Ondo, Ekiti and Osun states are the leading producers of cocoa in Nigeria, while the southern portions of Ogun and Ondo states (Odigbo, Okitipupa and Irele) play host to large plantations of oil palm and rubber.

The northern and western portions of the region is characterized by tropical woodland savanna climate (Aw), with a single rainfall maxima. This area covers the northern two-thirds of Oyo, northwestern Ogun, Kwara, Kogi, Collines (Benin), northern half of Plateau department (Benin) and central Togo. It is part of the Guinean forest–savanna mosaic ecoregion, a transitional zone between West Africa's coastal forests and interior savannas. Part of this region is derived savanna which was once covered in forest but has lost tree cover due to agricultural and other pressures on land. Annual rainfall here hovers between 1,100 and 1,500 millimetres (43 and 59 in). Annual precipitation in Ilorin for example is 1,220 millimetres or 48.03 inches. Tree species here include the Blighia sapida more commonly known as ackee in English and ishin in Yoruba, and Parkia biglobosa which is the locust bean tree used in making iru or ogiri, a local cooking condiment.

The monsoon (rainy period) in both climatic zones is followed by a drier season characterized by northwest trade winds that bring the harmattan (cold dust-laden windstorms) that blow from the Sahara. They normally affect all areas except a small portion of the southern coast. Nonetheless, it has been reported that the harmattan has reached as far as Lagos in some years.

== Major cities/towns ==
Largest cities or towns in Yorubaland 2016–2018 Estimates
| Rank | | Region | Pop. | Rank | | Region | Pop. |
|---|---|---|---|---|---|---|---|
| 1 | Èkó (Metropolis) | Lagos State | 23,437,435 (Note: Metropolitan Lagos comprises 16 of Lagos State's 20 LGA, which excludes: Badagry, Epe, Ibeju-Lekki and Ikorodu) | 11 | Ọ̀yọ́ | Oyo State | 602,000 (Note: Comprising Oyo East, Oyo West and Atiba LGAs) |
| 2 | Ìbàdàn | Oyo State | 3,675,000 (Note: Summing the 11 LGAs of Ibadan Metro) | 12 | Gbágli | Lagos State | 555,162 (Note: The Badagry Local Government Area) |
| 3 | Ìlọrin | Kwara State | 1,120,000 (Note: Ilorin consists of 3 LGAs, namely: Ilorin East, Ilorin South & Ilorin West but has grown suburbs into parts of Asa) | 13 | Adó Èkìtì | Ekiti State | 465,000 (Note: Population based on the Ado Local Government Area of Ekiti State) |
| 4 | Ìkòròdú | Lagos State | 1,005,551 (Note: Ikorodu Local Government Area, 2018 LASG Estimate) | 14 | Ògbómọ̀ṣọ́ | Oyo State | 420,400 (Note: Comprises Ogbomosho North and Ogbomosho South LGAs) |
| 5 | Òṣogbo (Conurbation) | Osun State | 820,000 (Note: The Osogbo conurbation comprises Osogbo, Irepodun, Olorunda, Orolu and Egbedore LGAs) | 15 | Òde Oǹdó | Ondo State | 390,000 (Note: Ondo township is based on Ondo West Local Government Urban Area) |
| 6 | Abẹ́òkúta | Ogun State | 777,000 (Note: Summation of Abeokuta North, Abeokuta South and Odeda) | 16 | Ìkirè-Apọ̀mù | Osun State | 337,200 (Note: This is the summation of Irewole, and Isokan LGAs) |
| 7 | Ifọ̀-Àkútè-Ìjòkó (Conurbation) | Ogun State | 750,000 (Note: Large urban sprawl based on Ifo, including Akute, Ijoko and Ajuwon townships) | 17 | Ìṣàgámù | Ogun State | 325,000 (Note: A large township whose population Center is based on Sagamu township but also urban sprawl spilling over from Ikorodu) |
| 8 | Ọ̀tà | Ogun State | 733,400 (Note: A large and growing exurb of Lagos metropolis based chiefly on the city of Ota) | 18 | Ìkìrun-Ìrágbìjí | Osun State | 323,900 (Note: Summation of Boripe and Ifelodun LGAs) |
| 9 | Ilé-Ifẹ̀ | Osun State | 701,100 (Note: Summation of Ife North, Ife East and Ife Central but excluding Ife South which is not within the Ife metropolitan area) | 19 | Ọ̀ghọ̀ | Ondo State | 300,000 (Note: Based on the Owo, Local Government Area) |
| 10 | Àkúrẹ́ | Ondo State | 662,800 (Note: Summation of The Akure North and Akure South LGAs) | 20 | Iléṣà | Osun State | 292,300 (Note: Encompassing Ilesa West, and Ilesa East LGAs) |

== Administrative divisions ==
Yorubaland
Country | Nigeria
| State | Area (km^{2}) | Regional capital | Largest city | 2nd largest city |
| Ekiti State | 6,353 | Ado Ekiti | Ado Ekiti | Ikere-Ekiti |
| Kogi State | 9,351 | Lokoja | Kabba | Isanlu, Egbe |
| Kwara State | 17,000 | Ilorin | Ilorin | Offa |
| Lagos State | 3,345 | Ikeja | Alimosho | Ikorodu |
| Ogun State | 16,762 | Abeokuta | Otta-Ijoko-Ifo | Abeokuta |
| Ondo State | 15,500 | Akure | Akure | Ondo, okitipupa |
| Osun State | 9,251 | Osogbo | Osogbo | Ile-Ife, Ilesha |
| Oyo State | 28,454 | Ibadan | Ibadan | Oyo, Ogbomoso |
Area = 106,016 km^{2}
Country | Benin
| Department | Area (km^{2}) | Regional capital | Largest city | 2nd largest city |
| Borgu (Shaworo) | 5,000 | ____ | Shaworo | Kpakpanin |
| Collines | 12,440 | Igbo Idaasha | Shabe | Idaasha |
| Donga (Bassila) | 5,661 | ____ | Bassila | Manigri |
| Plateau | 3,264 | Sakete | Pobe | Kétou, Sakete |
| Weme | 500 | Porto-Novo | Porto-Novo | Adjarra |
Area ≈ 26,865 km^{2}
Country | Togo
| Region | Area (km^{2}) | Regional capital | Largest city | 2nd largest city |
| Central (Chamba) | 2,900 | ____ | Kaboli | Alejo, Goubi |
| Plateaux | 6,482 | Atakpame | Atakpame | Anié, Morita |
Area ≈ 9,233 km^{2}
Yorubaland Area ≈ 142,114 km^{2}

== Prehistory and oral tradition ==
=== Settlement ===
Oduduwa is regarded as the legendary progenitor of the Yoruba, and almost every Yoruba settlement traces its origin to princes of Ile-Ife in Osun State, Nigeria. As such, Ife can be regarded as the cultural and spiritual homeland of the Yoruba nation, both within and outside Nigeria. According to an Oyo account, Oduduwa was a Yoruba emissary; said to have come from the east, sometimes understood by some sources as the "vicinity" true east on the cardinal points, but more likely signifying the region of the Ekiti and Okun sub-communities in Yorubaland, Nigeria. On the other hand, linguistic evidence seems to corroborate the fact that the eastern half of Yorubaland was settled at an earlier time in history than the western regions, as the Northwest and Southwest Yoruba dialects show more linguistic innovations than their central and eastern counterparts.

=== Pre-Civil War ===
Between 1100 and 1400, the Yoruba Kingdom of Ife experienced a golden age, part of which was a sort of artistic and ideological renaissance. It was then surpassed by the Oyo Empire as the dominant Yoruba military and political power between 1700 and 1900. Yoruba people generally feel a deep sense of culture and tradition that unifies and helps identify them. There are sixteen established kingdoms, states that are said to have been descendants of Oduduwa himself. The other sub-kingdoms and chiefdoms that exist are second order branches of the original sixteen kingdoms.

There are various groups and subgroups in Yorubaland based on the many distinct dialects of the Yoruba language, which although mostly mutually intelligible, have peculiar differences. The governments of these diverse people are quite intricate and each group and subgroup varies in their pattern of governance. In general, government begins at home with the immediate family. The next level is the extended family with its own head, an Olori-Ebi. A collection of distantly related extended families makes up a town. The individual chiefs that serve the towns as corporate entities, called Olóyès, are subject to the Baálẹ̀s that rule over them. A collection of distantly related towns makes up a clan. A separate group of Oloyes are subject to the Oba that rules over an individual clan, and this Oba may himself be subject to another Oba, depending on the grade of the Obaship.

In this, government begins at home. The father of the family is considered the "head" and his first wife is the mother of the house. If her husband chooses to marry another wife, that wife must show proper respect to the first wife even if the first wife is chronologically younger. Children are taught to have respect for all those who are older than they are. This includes their parents, aunts, uncles, elder siblings, and cousins who they deal with every day. ... Any adult presumably has as much authority over a child as the child's parents do. All members of a particular clan live in the same compound and share family resources, rights, and possessions such as land

— Bascom 1969

== History ==
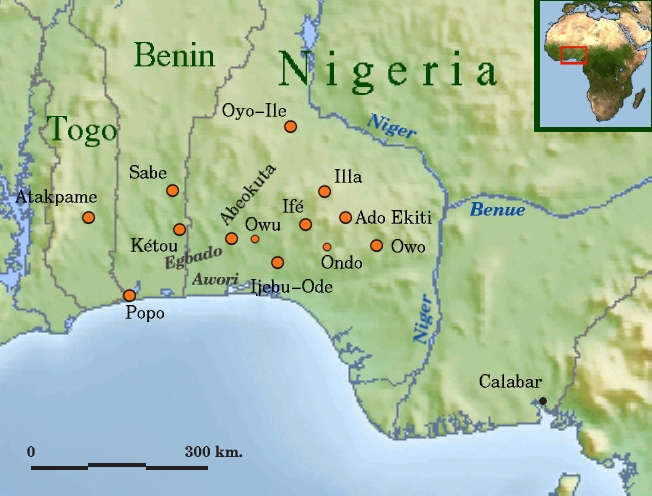
Map of medieval Yoruba cities

=== Government ===
Ife was surpassed by the Oyo Empire as the dominant Yoruba military and political power between the year 1600 and 1800. The nearby kingdom of Benin was also a powerful force between 1300 and 1850. Most of the city states were controlled by Obas, priestly monarchs, and councils made up of Oloyes, recognised leaders of royal, noble and, often, even common descent, who joined them in ruling over the kingdoms through a series of guilds and sects. Different states saw differing ratios of power between the kingship and the chiefs' council. Some, such as Oyo, had powerful, autocratic monarchs with almost total control, while in others the senatorial councils were supreme and the Ọba served as something of a figurehead. In all cases, however, Yoruba monarchs were subject to the continuing approval of their constituents as a matter of policy, and could be easily compelled to abdicate for demonstrating dictatorial tendencies or incompetence. The order to vacate the throne was usually communicated through an aroko or symbolic message, which usually took the form of parrot eggs delivered in a covered calabash bowl by the Basorun the head of Oyomesi (the lawmakers) after Judgements from the Ogbonis which were in the judiciary wing. In most cases, the message would compel the Oba to take his own life, which he was bound by oath to do.

=== Wars and the Atlantic Slave Trade ===
The rise of the Atlantic Slave Trade coincided with the expansion of the Oyo Empire, in the 16th and 17th centuries. This led Oyo to became a major slave trading power by the 18th century, with conquered neighbours (such as the Nupe, Borno, Allada, Ewe states, and Dahomey) having to pay tribute to Oyo. This included slaves who were forced to work on Oyo's imperial farmland, while a surplus was sold to Europeans traders on the Atlantic coast. Yorubaland was located on the bight of Benin and for the centuries priot to the 1700s, the export of enslaved people from Yorubaland was smaller than neighbouring regions.

Most of the enslaved people were captives from neighbouring peoples (specifically the Nupe, Borno, Aja, Ewe, and Fon) conquered by Oyo. Oyo rarely exported fellow Yorubas, except for hardened criminals and enemies of the empire. However, by the late 18th century, the ethnic demographics of the enslaved exports from Yorubaland began to change. This period was marked by increased warfare and political instability in the Oyo Empire, due to competition with nearby slave trading states. This resulted in Yoruba people beginning to make up a large portion of the enslaved people from the bight of Benin.

Following a jihad (known as the Fulani War) led by Uthman Dan Fodio (1754–1817) and a rapid consolidation of the Hausa city-states of contemporary northern Nigeria, the Fula Sokoto Caliphate annexed the buffer Nupe Kingdom and began to press southwards towards the Oyo Empire. Shortly after, they overran the Yoruba city of Ilorin and then sacked Ọyọ-Ile, the capital city of the Oyo Empire. Repeated incursions by Dahomey to the west began to cripple Oyo. However, the southern expansion of the Sokoto Caliphate dealt a fatal blow to Oyo's hegemony, leading to its ultimate collapse. The Yoruba had rallied to resist Sokoto, under the military leadership of the city-state of Ibadan, which rose from the old Oyo Empire, and of the Ijebu kingdom, but were unsuccessful.

With Oyo hegemony diminished, the other Yoruba city-states were free of Oyo rule and no longer protected by its military. This created a power vacuum that embroiled in a series of internecine wars, known as the Yoruba Civil Wars. This, along with conflict with non-Yoruba neighbours, caused thousands of Yoruba captives to enter the Atlantic Slave Trade, in the first half of the 19th century. This forcibly transported Yoruba people across to the Americas and the Caribbean, with a heavy presence and influence in Latin America. They would eventually end up in such countries as Cuba,the Dominican Republic, Puerto Rico, Brazil, Trinidad and Tobago, St. Lucia, Columbia, and Venezuela, the United States, among others.

Notable Yoruba People trafficked into the Atlantic Slave Trade following the collapse of the Oyo Empire are Sarah Forbes Bonetta (Aina), Cudjoe Lewis (Oluale Kossola), Matilda McCrear (Abake), Redoshi, Seriki Williams Abass (Ifaremilekun Fagbemi), Remigio Herrera, Samuel Ajayi Crowther, Osifekunde of Ijebu, Scipio Vaughan, and John Baptist Dasalu. .

=== British colonization of Yorubaland ===
During the 19th century, the British Empire gradually colonized Yorubaland. In 1892, the British declared war on the Ijebu Kingdom in response to its barriers on trade. The British emerged victorious in the conflict and occupied the Ijebu capital. After British colonization, the capital served as an administrative center for colonial officials as the kingdom was annexed to the colony of Southern Nigeria. The colony was gradually expanded by protectorate treaties. These treaties proved decisive in the eventual annexation of the rest of Yorubaland and, eventually, of southern Nigeria and the Cameroons.

In 1960, greater Yorubaland was subsumed into the Federal Republic of Nigeria.

According to Yoruba historians, by the time the British came to colonize and subjugate Yorubaland first to itself and later to the Fulani of Northern Nigeria, the Yoruba were getting ready to recover from what is popularly known as the Yoruba Civil War. One of the lessons of the internecine Yoruba wars was the opening of Yorubaland to Fulani hegemony whose major interest was the imposition of sultanistic despotism on Old Oyo Ile and present-day Ilorin. The most visible consequence of this was the adding of almost one-fifth of Yorubaland from Offa to Old Oyo to Kabba to the then-Northern Nigeria of Lord Frederick Lugard and the subsequent subjugation of this portion of Yorubaland under the control of Fulani feudalism.
