= Ovia River =

River in Nigeria

- Location of the lower mouth of the Ovia River in Nigeria

Location
- Country: Nigeria
- State: Edo State, Kogi State, Ondo State
- Region: West Africa

Physical characteristics
- Mouth: Benin River
  - coordinates: 05°54′36″N 05°16′12″E
- Length: 120 km (75 mi)
- Basin size: 2,500 km^{2} (970 sq mi)
- Discharge
  - average: 42 m³/s (1,483 cfs)

The Ovia River or Osse River is a perennial watercourse in Southwestern Nigeria, flowing through the states of; Kogi, Ondo and Edo, before emptying into the Gulf of Guinea. Its watercourse spans approximately 120 kilometers (75 miles) through diverse terrain.

== Geography ==
The Ovia (Osse) River originates in the Apata hills section of the Yorubaland plateau, a region of mildly undulating terrain and rolling hills west of the Niger-Benue confluence and north of the town of Kabba in the region between the present day Ekiti and Kogi states of Nigeria. This local watershed is also the source of various other rivers in the region, including the Ogun and Osun rivers.

The river then begins its southerly flow course, first through Kogi state, after which it forms the local state boundaries between Ondo and northern Edo state before re-entering southern Edo state where it is joined by its major tributary; the Ogbese River before emptying into the lower mouth of the Benin Estuary in the Gulf of Guinea.

== Mythology and History ==
Edo mythology relates the stories of Ovia, a woman from Uhen village known for her great beauty and unwavering principles. She vowed to marry only a king, setting high standards for her suitors. In a distant land, the king of Oyo learned of Ovia's captivating allure and sought to make her his queen. Ovia's parents consented to the union, gifting her with mystical items, including a protective water pot, a canine companion, and a parrot. Ovia's sojourn at the Oyo kingdom was marked by challenges, including envy among the king's existing wives, which led to unjust accusations and conspiration to tarnish Ovia's reputation. The senior wife devised a cunning scheme, gathering her co-wives for a purported snail-hunting expedition. During the snail-hunting expedition, her co-wives took with them a bowl, Ovia however chose to keep her snails in her white robe. Ovia's pristine white cloth became soiled by the snails' slimy residue.

Upon returning to the palace, Ovia faced unjust accusations of harbouring an infection, leading to public disgrace. Overwhelmed by sorrow, she sought solace in her quarters, where her tears flowed as freely as a river. Remarkably, her tears filled her father's mystical pot gifted to her and which she had brought along with her. The ensuing river is believed to be the present-day Ovia River flowing through the western side of the Edo area and symbolizing her sacrifice and transformation into a revered goddess of peace and providence within Benin culture. An annual festival, during which women are prohibited from witnessing the rites, was established in her honour.

The history of the Ovia River is deeply intertwined with Nigeria's heritage, spanning centuries.

=== Cultural significance ===
The Ovia River has a cultural and spiritual significance in the region. According to local beliefs, Ovia was a beautiful woman transformed into the river, making it the largest river in the kingdom of Benin. She is worshipped in many communities, but there are strict customs in place. Women are not allowed to enter her sacred groves.

During the Ovia festival, an integral part of the river's cultural heritage, most men in the community go into seclusion in the groves around the shrine for varying periods, ranging from a week to three months. They wear masks and emerge periodically to dance, often in elaborate attire. Each dancer represents the spirits of past worshippers, and each impersonates their most patrilineal ancestor. These spirits are believed to exist on the threshold between the visible world and the sacred realm.

The festival is accompanied by various prohibitions and rituals, with the community observing bans on sexual relations and quarrelling during this period. Women are forbidden from touching the masqueraders or participating in their activities.

The Ovia Festival features dances, accompanied by the beating of Ikpasa sticks, clappers, and songs. The festival culminates in the obodo, a stage of acrobatic performances.

The festival is also a time for the community to come together and express solidarity. Blessings and curses sought from Ovia during the festival are considered particularly potent.

At the end of the festival, the women of the community perform the Agbala dance, signifying the return of the men to the real world. The festival concludes with a rite of reconciliation between the sexes, reinforcing the importance of cooperation within the community.

=== Pre-colonial era (circa 14th - 19th century) ===
The Ovia River basin served as the cradle of indigenous cultures and communities for generations. Its verdant banks bore witness to the rise and fall of various ethnic groups, notably the Bini and Esan people. These communities established settlements, relying on the river's bounty for sustenance. The Ovia River became the lifeblood of agriculture, with fertile soils nourished by annual floods, fostering the growth of yams, cassava, and various crops that sustained the local populations.

The river held profound spiritual significance. Local folklore abounds with tales of river deities and spirits, with rituals and ceremonies performed along its shores to appease and seek favor from these supernatural entities.

Trade flourished along the river's course, connecting inland communities with coastal trade routes. The Ovia River became a crucial conduit for commerce, facilitating the exchange of agricultural goods and crafts. The riverbanks bustled with markets and trading posts where ivory, spices, and exotic materials exchanged hands, attracting traders from distant regions.

=== Colonial influence (19th - 20th century) ===
The arrival of European colonial powers in the 19th century heralded significant changes along the Ovia River. The British, in particular, recognized its strategic importance and established settlements such as Benin City along its banks. This marked the beginning of a new era as colonial administrators imposed their governance structures on the region.

The river's significance in the colonial period extended beyond trade. It became a vital transportation route, with steamships navigating its waters. These steamships connected the inland communities to the coastal ports, facilitating the export of commodities like palm oil, rubber, and timber. The riverbanks evolved with the construction of ports, warehouses, and administrative centers.

While the colonial presence brought infrastructure development, it also introduced challenges. Land disputes and resource exploitation became contentious issues as colonial powers exerted control. Indigenous communities struggled to retain their land and traditional ways of life.

=== Post-independence and modern era (20th century - present) ===
Nigeria's independence in 1960 marked a new chapter in the Ovia River's history. Irrigation schemes were established, enhancing agricultural productivity and providing livelihoods to farmers. The river's waters powered small-scale hydroelectric projects, contributing to the electrification of nearby communities.

However, the modern era has also brought environmental challenges. Rapid urbanization and industrialization have led to pollution of the river, impacting water quality and aquatic life. Conservation efforts, led by government agencies and local communities, aim to address these issues and protect the river's ecosystem.

In recent decades, the Ovia River has gained recognition as a site of ecological importance. Efforts to conserve its diverse flora and fauna have led to the establishment of protected areas and wildlife reserves along its course. Scientific research into the river's ecosystem continues, shedding light on its unique biodiversity and ecological significance.

== Environmental concerns ==
In recent years, the Ovia River has faced environmental challenges, including pollution from industrial and agricultural activities. Conservation efforts and initiatives to preserve the river's ecosystem are ongoing, with the aim of safeguarding its natural beauty and ecological significance.

In 2012, an auto-crash occurred at the Ovia River bridge involving lecturers of Igbinedion University, Okada, resulting in the unfortunate loss of four lives when a car plunged into the river.
