= Olowu of Owu Kingdom =

Yoruba king of Owu kingdom

The Olowu of Owu is the paramount Yoruba king of Owu kingdom. The first Olowu of Owu (son of Oduduwa's daughter) is also one of the original kings in Yorubaland.

The Owu Kingdom is ruled by princes selected from six ruling houses: Amororo, Otileta, Ayoloye, Akinjobi, Akinoso and Lagbedu. The king is assisted by appointed chiefs known as the kingmakers. The Akogun heads the chiefs, Obamaja, Orunto, Oyega, Osupori and Omolasin. Olosi is the Ifa priest of the Olowu. Originally, the Owu Kingdom had 3 townships namely Owu, Erunmu and Apomu. By tradition, the Olowu is selected by six kingmakers but two more chieftaincies were added to this number in 1964, those of the Balogun and the Olosi.

== Past and Present Olowu of Owu Kingdom (Owu Kings) ==
Legendary Olowu

- Oba Ajibosin "Asunkungbade" 12-13th century

- The six current Owu royal families, Otileta, Ayoloye, Amororo, Akinoso, Lagedu, and Akinjobi are considered to be sons of Ajibosin, but likely represent influential descendants of Ajibosin whose descendants continue to occupy the throne. The reigns of several of these monarchs are lost to history Pre-Abeokuta Olowu of Owu-Ipoole.

- Oba Amororo? ?-1817 - his reign is disputed
- Oba Akijala 1817-1825
- Oba Akinjobi 1820-1834

Olowu of Owu in Abeokuta

- Oba Pawu 1855-1867 (OTILETA I)
- Oba Adefowote 1867-1872 (OTILETA II)
- Oba Aderinmoye 1873-1890 (OTILETA III)
- Oba Adepegba 1893-1905 (AYOLOYE I)
- Oba Owokokade 1906-1918 (OTILETA IV)
- Oba Adesunmbo Dosunmu 1918-1924 (AMORORO I) (descendant of Oba Amororo)
- Oba Adesina Aderinoye 1924-1936 (OTILETA V)
- Oba Adelani Gbogboade March 1938- August 15, 1946 (OTILETA VI)
- Oba Salami Gbadela Adewunmi Ajibola 1949-1972 (AYOLOYE II) (A great-great-grandson of Oba Akijala through his son Latinlu, and his son Ileyilaagba)
- Oba Adebowale Oyegbade 1975-1980 (AKINJOBI I) (Descendant of Oba Akinjobi)
- OBA Michael Ayinde Oyelekan April 29th, 1987-May 8th, 1987 (AKINOSO I)
- Oba Olawale Adisa Odeleye October 30, 1993-June 11, 2003 (LAGBEDU I)
- Oba Adegboyega Dosunmu Amororo II From July 14, 2005-December 12, 2021 (AMORORO II) (Grandson of Dosunmu through his third son Okelana Dosunmu)
- Oba Prof. Saka Adelola Matemilola Oluyalo from July 27, 2022- till date (OTILETA VII)
