= Ijoko =

- City
- Location within Nigeria
- Coordinates: 06°45′00″N 03°16′00″E
- Country: Nigeria
- State: Ogun State
- Local government area: Ifo Local Government
- Time zone: UTC+1 (WAT)

Ijoko is a town in Sango/Ijoko Local Council Development Area of Ogun State, Western Nigeria, located north of Lagos and south of Abeokuta.

== Geography ==
It is an Ogun State border town with Lagos with large scale businesses and thriving retail businesses, a spill over from the congested mega city of Lagos. Ijoko was originally an Owu-Egba settlement but also accommodated other diverse people.

== Transport ==
It has been served by a station on the western network of the national railways since 1912 by virtue of a treaty signed with the United Kingdom by the Alake solely for this purpose as the officially recognised owner of the whole of Ota District Land for Abeokuta. Ijoko is also served by various road networks that leads to neighborhood city of Lagos, Idiroko, Ifo.

== See also ==
- Railway stations in Nigeria
