= Owu Kingdom =

Yoruba subgroup

The Owu sub-ethnicity is a part of the Yoruba people of West Africa. Ago-Owu in Abeokuta is where the Owus are mostly concentrated, however large Owu settlements are found throughout Yorubaland. The Yoruba confederacy of kingdoms extends beyond the boundaries of Nigeria into the Republic of Benin and Togo.

== Origin ==
The history of the Owus was first documented following their first settlement in Ago-Owu in 1820. It is believed from oral history tradition that the Owus occupied an area directly along and below Niger River in the present country of Nigeria. The southward migration of the Owus was a direct result of both tribal and ethnic conflicts. Unlike previous settlements, the Owus did not attempt to fight against the army of Ibadan but instead settled in peacefully because the rulers of Ibadan had sent peaceful emissaries to the Owus after getting intelligence of the Owus' supposedly imminent attack on their town. The rulers of Ibadan offered land to the Owus to settle on, spreading from Ita Lisa to Owu Ipole near Ikire.

=== Ijebu and Ife war against Owu ===
In 1821–26, the armies of both Ijebu and the Ife attacked and devastated Owu Ipole. The Owus abandoned their heavily fortified city and escaped southwestward in groups toward Ibadan in about 1826. From these outskirts, they marched on and across Ogun River and finally arrived at Oke Ata near Abeokuta where Sodeke, the Egba paramount chief, persuaded the gallant Owus to settle in Abeokuta about 1834. It is imperative to state that the present Orile Owu is the same place as Owu Ipole where the Owus from Iwo and other places resettled in the early 20th century. The people of Erunmu (founded by the older brother of an earlier Olowu from the Amororo Ruling House) were always loyal to the cause of Owu Kingdom. During the Owu war, the Olowu was carried on his back (to disguise his escape) from Orile Owu (Owu Ipole) to Orile Erunmu, guarded by a combined team of his royal guards and Oba Erunmu's royal guards. After Orile Owu was devastated, the remaining Owu army retreated to defend Orile Erunmu against the allied army of Ijebu and Ife.

=== Safeguarding the crown ===
Before Orile Erunmu was also devastated and razed to the ground, the Olowu and the Oluroko of Erunmu devised strategies to ensure that the royal lineages and the crown inherited from Oduduwa were preserved. The Olowu entrusted the Owu crown to a warrior, simply referred to as Akogun (Owu's first documented Akogun warrior - Akogun being a title similar to a modern army defense chief), Ijaola and a few of the king's closest aides. When the siege on Erunmu began, Akogun was assigned to the warfront with the hope that he could turn the tide of war while Ijaola was sent on a mandatory royal assignment to Ibadan with a message for Maye, the Ibadan warlord. Before these two crown trustees left to carry out their respective orders, they had to entrust Oni (a skilled and specialized trader and farmer, and also the older stepbrother of Ijaola) with safeguarding the crown. Oni and other men entrusted with the crown mingled with the refugees that eventually settled in Abeokuta. These men had strict instructions not to disclose the whereabout of the crown in the absence of the Akogun and Ijaola, unless they received news of their death. The crown is now resident at Owu-Ijebu and not Owu-Abeokuta. It remains the pride of all Owu descendants.

=== Interregnum ===
In 1855, the Owus crowned Oba Pawu as the first King Olowu of the Owus at Oke Ago-Owu, Abeokuta. Notably, there was a 21-year interregnum between the settlement of the Owu sojourners in Abeokuta and the crowning of Pawu as the first Olowu in Abeokuta. He reigned for 12 years.

The reason for the interregnum may be attributed to the deterioration of the socio-cultural bond that became evident during the journey between Orile Owu and Abeokuta. Hardship had made these Owu families insensitive to each other's welfare. The worst affected were the people of Erunmu because they were fewer. As a result of their minority status they were marginalized by other Owu indigenes. Oni the keeper of the crown was convinced that if he revealed the crown to a people who had grown insensitive to the needs of their brothers, he would allow despotic rule to hold sway over the townships of Owu, Erunmu and Apomu (the Owu kingdom in Abeokuta). Over the years, Akogun (the warlord) arrived in Abeokuta, but he could neither locate Ijaola nor Ijaola's stepbrother, Oni. Also, unknown to the Olowu and Oluroko, Ijaola returned to Erunmu but had to hide on a farm settlement to escape capture. He later settled in Iwo town where there was a community of Owu refugees and began to trade in commodities and prisoners of war. It was in the course of this trade that he re-connected with his stepbrother through another itinerant Owu merchant who was based in Abeokuta. Eventually, all arrangements were made for Ijaola to migrate to Abeokuta where he re-settled the people of Erunmu in Ita Erunmu (now called Totoro, after a tree). After Ijaola, Akogun and Oni consulted with each other, they revealed the crown of Oduduwa 21 years after the Owu people first settled in Abeokuta.

== Ogboni council vs. Igbimo council ==
The Olowu of Owu, Oba (King) Dr. Olusanya Adegboyega Dosunmu Amororo II (Amororo Ruling House) ended the conferment of Ogboni traditional titles in Owu Abeokuta because the Ogboni tradition is alien to Owu culture. Though, the Owus had associated themselves with the secretive Ogboni culture for over a century, they nonetheless do not have any Ogboni house and do not operate according to Ogboni tenets. The Owus do not have an Oluwo (Ogboni Head Chief) and do not hold Ogboni assemblies. On the contrary, the Owu palace has its own culture of open deliberation where any Owu person can participate. That is why people refer to the Owus as “Owu a gbooro gbimo” meaning "Owu the deliberative group".

== Olowu in Council ==
Seven groups constitute the Cabinet of the Olowu, who is the paramount ruler of Owu Kingdom. Those listed below, with the Olowu as chairman, constitute the Supreme Cabinet of the Olowu of Owu, which is now known as “Olowu-in-Council”. In order of authority:

1. Balogun
2. Olori Igbimo
3. Olori Omo-Oba
4. Olori Parakoyi
5. Oluroko of Erunmu
6. Balogun Apomu
7. Iyalode

== Owu day festival ==
The original purpose of celebrating Omo Olowu festival is to give thanks to Olodumare (Almighty God) for supplying all needs. The annual Owu Day festival tradition started in 1999 and has attracted participation by several Owu indigenes and people from all over the world. On October 9, 2010, the Olowu of Owu Abeokuta Oba Dosunmu publicly declared the second weekend of the month of October as Owu's public celebration of the goodness of the Almighty God, to usher in the new Omo Olowu festival replacing the Owu Day Festival. The new Omo Olowu festival (reported in owulakoda.wordpress.com/2010/10/29/omo-olowu-festival-kicks-off) also incorporated the ancient traditional New Yam Festival, which was staged by the Olowu. The 2010 festival was attended by the past Ooni of Ife, Oba Okunade Sijuade Olubuse [II], former President of Nigeria & Balogun of Owu Chief Olusegun Obasanjo; Chief of Staff to President Goodluck Jonathan, Chief Mike Oghiedome; Former Deputy Governor of Ogun state and Field Commander of ECOMOG, Rtd General Tunji Olurin.

== Bibliography ==
- Owu in Yoruba history, Mabogunje, Akin L., Omer-Cooper, John D., Ibadan University Press, 1971
