= Adegboyega Dosunmu Amororo II =

Adegboyega Dosunmu II (CON)

Olowu of Owu Kingdom
- Reign: July 2005 – December 2021
- Predecessor: Oba Adisa Odeleye
- Born: Owu kingdom, Ogun State South-Western Nigeria
- Died: December 2021; Abeokuta, Ogun state
- Spouse: Mrs. Iyabode Adetoun Dosunmu (nee Sanni) widowed Mrs. Olatunbosun Dosunmu, (nee Oyetayo)
- House: Palace of the Olowu of Owu Kingdom
- Father: Benjamin Okelana Dosunmu

Adegboyega Dosunmu Amororo II (CON was the traditional ruler of Owu kingdom, Ogun State, Nigeria with the appellations of Olowu of Owu Kingdom. He succeeded Oba Olawale Adisa Odeleye, Lagbedu 1 who died in June 2003 at the age of 65 years.

== Early life ==
Oba Adegboyega Dosunmu was born to Prince Benjamin Okelana Dosunmu (a member of the ruling family under the lineage of late Adesunmbo Dosunmu, Amororo I, who reigned between 1918 and 1924). Benjamin Okelana Dosunmu was the third son of the late Oba Adesunmbo Dosunmu, Amororo l. He attended the Owu Baptist Day School, Abeokuta for his Primary Education in 1941 and eventually joined the Baptist Boys High School, Abeokuta, where he obtained the West African Senior School Certificate in 1950. After he graduated from King's College, Lagos in 1956, he was admitted into Hendon College of Technology in London to study Drama and Television Production in 1963. He proceeded to Landmark Baptist College Tennessee, USA in 1987 where he obtained a bachelor's degree in Theology.

== Career ==
Dosunmu joined the Nigerian Civil Service as a Clerk Grade II in 1956 at the Nigerian Railway Corporation, Ebute Metta, Lagos state. After serving in that capacity for two years, he joined a broadcasting organization where he rose to the position of Head of Drama Department. Dosunmu later worked as a Broadcaster at the Nigerian Broadcasting Corporation where he rose to the position of Head of Drama Department. He is the producer of a Popular Nigerian TV soap, The Village Headmaster that holds the record of being the longest running popular TV series for over 20 years. He left the Nigerian Broadcasting Corporation in 1975 to establish a private film production outfit, Starline Films Limited under a production he wrote and directed the popular Nigerian movie, titled Dinner with the Devil, the first Enebeli Elebuwa's featured movie that brought him into limelight in 1974. He later joined politics and was elected as Chairman of Abeokuta Local Government in 1976. In July 2005, he was appointed the Olowu of Owu Kingdom.

== Awards and honours ==
He had received numerous awards and honours in recognition of his immense contributions to the development of the Owu kingdom and the nation. Among others are:

- Commander of the Order of Niger, CON awarded by late Umaru Musa Yar'Adua, the former president of the Federal Republic of Nigeria.
- Omolafe of Owu, a chieftaincy title awarded in 1968 by Oba Salami Gbadela Ajibola, Gbadela Ayoloye II.
- Omoluberin of Owu, a chieftaincy title awarded by Oba Adebowale Oyegbade, Akinjobi I in 1975.
