= Ado-Odo/Ota =

- LGA
- Interactive map of Ado-Odo/Ota
- Location in Nigeria
- Coordinates: 6°38′N 3°06′E
- Country: Nigeria
- State: Ogun State
- Headquarter: Ota

Government
  - Local Government Chairman: Sheriff Adewale Musa (APC)

Area
  - Total: 878 km^{2} (339 sq mi)

Population (2006 census)
  - Total: 896,700
- Time zone: UTC+1 (WAT)
- 3-digit postal code prefix: 112
- ISO 3166 code: NG.OG.AO
- Website: https://adoodootalg.org.ng/

The Ado-Odo/Ota Local Government Area is one of the 20 Local Government Areas of Ogun State, Nigeria. It came into existence on 19 May 1989, following the merging of Ota, part of the defunct Ifo/Ota Local Government with Ado-Odo/Igbesa Areas of the Yewa South Local Government. Ado-Odo/Ota borders on metropolitan Lagos. The Local Government Area is the second largest in Ogun State and it is headquartered at Ota (or Otta) at 6°41′00″N 3°41′00″E to the north of the Area. Other towns and cities include Araromi-Alade, Ado-Odo, Agbara, Igbesa, Iju-Ota, Itele, Kooko Ebiye Town, Owode, and Sango Ota.

It has an area of 878 km^{2} and a population of 526,565 at the 2006 census. Being primarily agrarian in nature, the Local Government Area produces cash and food crops especially cocoa, kola nut, palm oil, coffee, cassava, timber, maize, and vegetables. Mineral resources include kaolin, silica sand, gypsum, and glass sand.

The Local Government is populated mainly by the Awori people, a subset of the Yorubas and the original inhabitants of the area. However, other groups like Egbado, Egba, and Eguns constitute the local government. There are currently eleven Traditional Obaship institutions in the Local Government Area namely: Olofin of Ado-Odo, Olota of Ota, Onilogbo of Ilogbo, Oloja Ekun of Igbesa, Onikooko of Kooko Ebiye, Onitele of Itele, Amiro of Ilamiro, Onitekun of Itekun, Olodan of Odan Abuja Sule, Alagbara of Agbara, Onigun of Odan-Abuja, Onikogbo of Ikogbo, Olu of Owode Ota, Olu of Atan Ota, Olu of Ijoko Ota and Olu of Tigbo Ilu.

The Local Government Area boasts a range of cultural, traditional, and historic attractions. One of the most popular is the Egungun (Masquerade) festival in Ota alongside the Oduduwa (Odu'a) festival in Ado-Odo. There are also shrines such as Ijamido and Ogbodo Shrines. The second oldest storey building in West Africa can be found in Ota, the Vicarage of the St. James Anglican Church built in 1842.

The postal code of the area is 112.

There are a number of both Public and private healthcare centers in the Local Government. They include The Local Government Maternity, Sango Ota Primary Health Centre. Private medical centers include Ace Medicare, St Shiloh Medical Center, Central Specialist Hospital, Ojugbele Specialist Hospital etc

Universities and tertiary education institutions are Bells University of Technology, Covenant University, Crawford University, Allover Central Polytechnic etc.
