= Kesington Adebutu =

Nigerian gambling magnate

Chief Kesington Adebutu CON
- Born: Kesington Adebukunola Adebutu; 24 October 1935 (age 90)
- Education: Lagos Baptist Academy
- Occupations: businessman, gambling magnate, philanthropist
- Title: Founder and Chairman of Premier Lotto Limited
- Children: Ladi Adebutu; Segun Adebutu

Chief Kesington Adebukunola Adebutu CON (born 24 October 1935) is a Nigerian businessman and gambling magnate who founded Premier Lotto Limited, popularly known as Baba Ijebu. He began his career in the pools betting business in the 1960s and later partnered with Chief Adebayo Ayoku to establish Face-to-Face Pools, which was registered in 1971. He is described as a pioneer of Nigeria's lotto and pools betting industry.

Adebutu established Premier Lotto Limited in 2001, which operates under the Baba Ijebu brand and has become one of Nigeria's leading gaming companies. He holds the traditional titles of Odole-Oodua of Ifẹ and Balogun of Remo land.

== Early life ==
Adebutu was born on October 24, 1935, to the Muslim family of Alhaji Karimu Folarin and Alhaja Seliat Olasimbi in Iperu Remo, Ikenne Local Government Area, Ogun State. He began his primary education at Ijero Baptist School on Apapa Road, Ebute-Meta, Lagos, and attended Baptist Academy, Lagos. He began his secondary education in 1951 and completed it at Remo Secondary School in Sagamu, obtaining his Secondary School Leaving Certificate in 1955.

== Career ==
After completing his secondary education, Adebutu worked briefly for Cable and Wireless Limited, later known as NITEL. He subsequently joined Classic Chemical Limited, a pharmaceutical company that produced Andrews Liver Salts and Cafenol. He began as a salesman and later became sales manager. In 1963, he left the company to establish his own business.

== Philanthropy ==
Adebutu's philanthropic activities have focused primarily on education and healthcare through the Kesington Adebukunola Adebutu Foundation. His educational initiatives have included the donation of a library to Crescent University, Abeokuta, an e-library to Baptist Academy, Lagos, a radio station to Olabisi Onabanjo University, and facilities to Remo Methodist High School and Gaskiya College in Lagos.

In 2024, the foundation funded the construction of a 350-capacity media resource centre at the Nigerian Institute of Journalism in Lagos. In healthcare, he has supported medical outreach programmes and donated ₦300 million to the Lagos State Government during the COVID-19 pandemic. In 2025, he donated the Kesington Adebukunola Adebutu Research Centre to the College of Medicine, University of Lagos, to support medical research and training.
