= William Frederick Mellor =

English missionary

William Frederick Mellor was an English missionary who spent considerable time of his missionary endeavour in Ijebu-Remo. He embraced some of the culture of Remo and ended up being conferred a chieftaincy title by the Akarigbo. Upon his retirement, he left Nigeria in 1957 but returned in 1966 to work with Tai Solarin at Mayflower School, Ikenne.

== Life ==
=== Early life and education ===
Mellor was born in Stoke-on-Trent, Staffordshire, a city heavily influenced by the pottery industry, he came from a generation of potters, his great grandfather and grandfather worked for Mintons while his father worked for the Wedgwood company. Mellor's father died when he was a child and at the age of 14, Mellor embraced his family's career path and apprenticed at the ceramic firm of George Woolliscroft to earn some income and support the family. For a year, he worked on making lead free ceramic glazed tiles. In 1907, he changed firms and began a seven year apprenticeship with a pottery decoration company working on a variety of products produced by the city's potters. He attended Cauldon School and on Sundays, he usually attended the St Jude's Anglican Church but an encounter with a local Methodist preacher who was a bench mate at work prodded him to join the Wesleyan Church. He gradually became involved in the activities of the church becoming a Sunday school teacher at the local Methodist church and lay preacher within the Staffordshire area. While preparing to be a priest, Mellor began to develop little interest in various Methodist meetings and decided a life of missionary will be a better fit for him, originally having in mind working in India. Mellor wanted to study medicine and theology and before completing his apprenticeship, he took classes under the tutelage of the Workers' Educational Association. Between June and July, 1914, he started college education at Balliol College, Oxford working with R. H. Tawney on economic history but his education was interrupted by War. Mellor continued ministerial education in Staffordshire for a year before enlisting in the Royal Navy. He joined Devonport Depot and initially posted on HMS Eclipse, when a search was done for recruits with medical degrees or had past shown interest in medicine, his name caught the attention of the navy and he was posted to the navy hospital in Gibraltar. Towards the latter part of the war, he toured Freetown and Lagos with HMS Africa protecting convoys of cargo ships. It was at one of the stops at Freetown where he decided a change of missionary service from India to West Africa. In 1916, his younger brother who was aboard HMS Indefatigable during the Battle of Jutland died when his ship was sunk. In 1919, Mellor was demobilized and he was able to return to studies. He attended Handsworth College, Birmingham University and completed his education in 1921 with a degree in theology.

=== Remo ===
In 1921, Mellor sailed for Lagos to start a career as a Methodist missionary. Prior to his start, pioneer Wesleyan missionaries had earlier arrived in Ijebu in 1893, shortly after the Ijebu Expedition resulted in British occupation of Ijebu Ode and ended the kingdom's blockade of trade going to the coast. Shortly thereafter, Olumuyiwa Haastrup who was an adviser to the Akarigbo, wrote to the Wesleyan Church in London for a proposed mission house, while at the meantime, a Catechist can be provided and expense will be paid until the church finds it suitable to maintain a mission in Remo. In 1893, the Wesleyan Church sent a priest, H.J. Ellis and three un-ordained missionaries to Remo. The three missionaries built a mission house at Iperu from where they moved to other towns.

When Mellor arrived in Nigeria, he spent some weeks with Wesleyan priests who were already living in the country. In March 1922, he was posted to Sagamu to replace the outgoing priest as superintendent of Ijebu division. Sagamu was founded to replicate the structure of Abeokuta, a town consisting of villages and lineages converged together for defense purposes. In Ijebu and Ijebu-Remo, the Methodist Church was already established in the district with about 22 mission stations, close to 2,000 converts and 12 chapels. Mellor's efforts consolidated the presence of the Church and increased participation of community members in the activities of the Church. He developed cordial relationship with the local residents and was sometimes called upon to mediate conflicts between the residents and their Obas or British colonists. To seek new converts, the Methodists employed monthly open air church services as part of their evangelical mission and was a significant way it garnered more converts within the community. At the Ijebu-Remo mission, he was assisted by a group of women including Mrs Kuti, Janet Adegunle and Julie Sokoya with the proselytizing of the mission.

Mellors missionary activities within Remo also had its challenges, the church grew in Ijebu-Ode with the effort of J.A. Adegboyega and Pa Oworu and in Sagamu, Oba Adedoyin was a regular Sunday service attendee and the Oluwole family helped establish the church in Sagamu. But many of these elites who helped develop the mission were polygamists who had great influence behind the scenes but were ineligible for official leadership positions or full membership. The official position was for the men to reduce the surplus wives in order to attain full position with the church. Mellor opposed this attitude, he discouraged the men to do this or had to find ways to create a suitable just and careful arrangement for women if the men decide to live a monogamous life.

Mellor's success was visible in education, he started classes for catechists and another for new converts as preparation for induction to the Methodist Church. His job as superintendent also involved managing the church's primary schools within the circuit. There was a lack of secondary education facilities in the area for boys and girls, only one secondary school in the region, Ijebu Ode Grammar School then headed by Rev Ransome Kuti and girl's education was not fully supported with a proportion of 1 girl to 8 boys. Mellor developed craft training sessions for woman. He also encouraged girls education and cooperated with the local Anglican mission and Muslim community to establish Remo Secondary School, the first co-education secondary school in the country and Girls Secondary School, Shagamu. The girls secondary school developed a training class for teachers so as to increase the numbers of female teachers in the district. His interest in education led to his appointment as the representative of the Methodist order on the regional board of education where he was able to influence acceptance of co-education within the region. He also introduced the Boys and Girls' Brigade movement to Ijebu and Remo and was an influential leader who contributed to sustain the Boys Brigade during the colonial period.

Mellor also cultivated friendship with Akarigbo William Adedoyin and used his relationship and citizenship with colonists to help actualise Adedoyin's desire for an independent Remo division. In 1950, he was posted to Badagry and in 1957, he retired from missionary work.

=== Mayflower ===
While working in Remo, Mellor met a young Tai Solarin who was a looking for someone to recommend him for service with the Royal Air force. Both individuals later developed a relationship and Mellor came to represent the Methodist mission in Nigeria during its independence in 1960, Solarin asked him to come back to Ikenne and be a part of his new school. In 1966, Mellor finally returned to Remo and acted as an adviser to Solarin and managed the school's husbandry, at the school, he was popularly referred to as Baba.

Mellor influenced Solarin, an atheist to allow the creation of a chapel on school grounds.

=== Personal ===
Mellor was married to Cecilia who followed him to Remo. In 1930, she was wounded during a riot in Opobo. Mellor loved geography and travelling visiting most African countries with the exception of two.
