= Adegboyega Folaranmi Adedoyin =

Olympic athlete (1922–2014)

Adegboyega Adedoyin
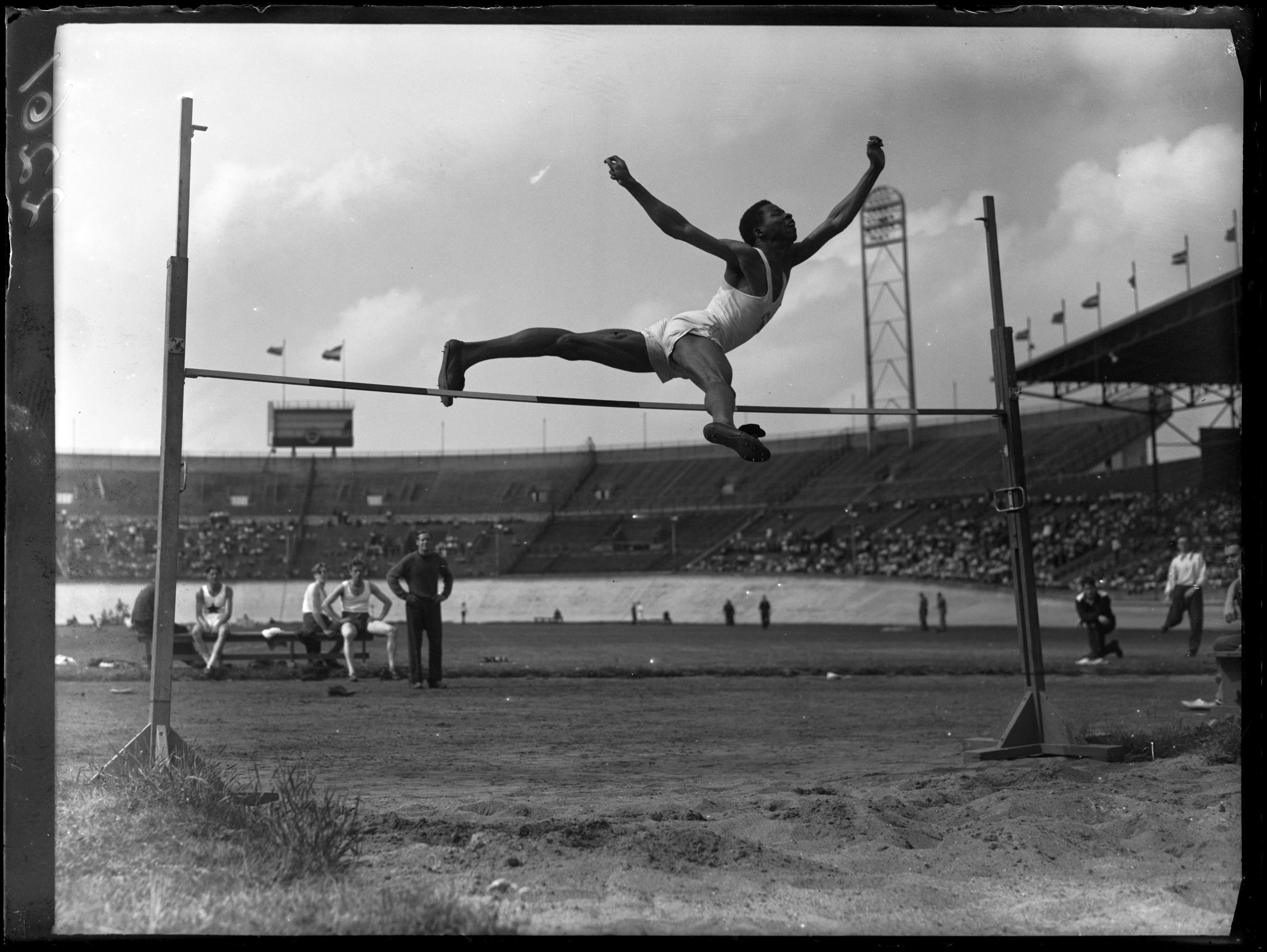
- Adedoyin high jumping in 1947

Personal information
- Nationality: Nigerian
- Born: 11 September 1922 Shagamu, Ogun, Nigeria
- Died: 31 January 2014 (aged 91) Abeokuta, Ogun, Nigeria
- Height: 180 cm (5 ft 11 in)
- Weight: 66 kg (146 lb)

Sport
- Sport: Athletics
- Event: high jump/long jump
- Club: Queen's University Belfast AC

Omoba Adegboyega Folaranmi Adedoyin, M.D. (11 September 1922 – 31 January 2014) was a Nigerian-born high jumper and long jumper, who became the first Nigerian to compete in an Olympics final in 1948, when representing Great Britain.

== Personal life ==
He was born in Sagamu, Ogun, Nigeria, and was a son of William Adedoyin, the Akarigbo of the Remo people. He came to the United Kingdom in 1942 to study at Queen's University of Belfast, where he graduated in medicine in 1949.

== Athletics career ==
He won the 1947 AAA Championships at the White City Stadium in the high jump with a clearance of 1.93 metres. Adedoyin featured in a 1947 newsreel by Pathé News focusing on university sports. In the footage, he is described as 'a good bet to represent Britain at the Olympic Games'.

He went on to compete for the Great Britain team in the 1948 Summer Olympics, both in the high jump and the long jump. In the high jump, on 30 July, he qualified for the final, as one of 20 competitors who made it past the qualifying round, where a height of 1.87 metres was needed to qualify. The sheer number of competitors in the high jump meant that the event seemed endless. In the final he jumped 1.90 metres on his third attempt to come twelfth – if he had cleared it on his first attempt he could have finished as high as sixth. A day later in the long jump, he qualified by virtue of placing in the top twelve in the qualifying round as less than twelve athletes reached the qualifying distance of 7.20 metres, with only five reaching it in the final. Adedoyin was one of these, placing fifth with a jump of 7.27 metres.

His personal best jumps were 1.969 metres in the high jump (1949) and 7.35 metres in the long jump (1947).

== Life after athletics ==
After the Olympics, he went back to Nigeria to practise as an obstetrician-gynaecologist.

He died on 31 January 2014.

== See also ==
- List of royal Olympians
