= List of royal Olympians =

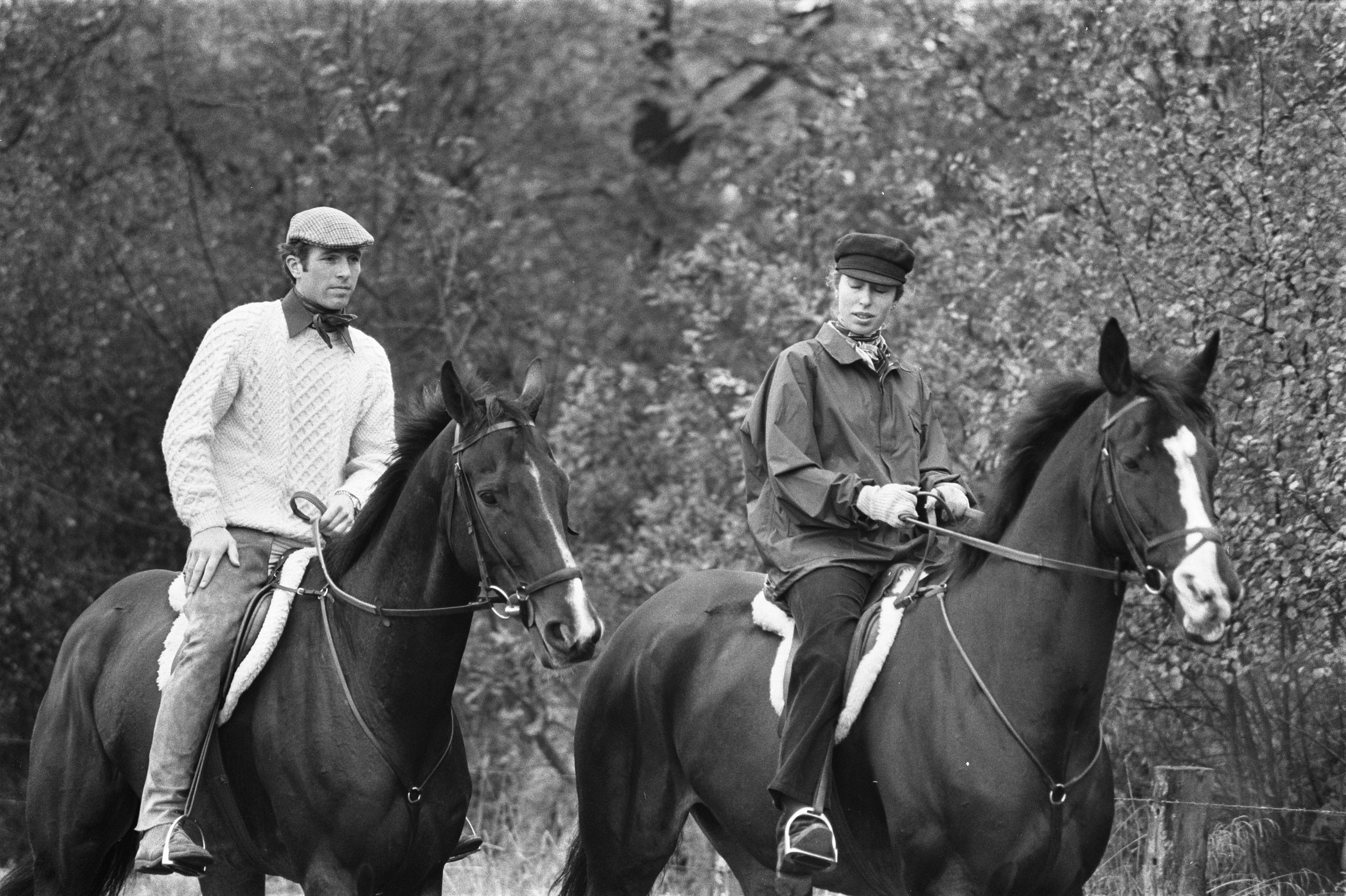
Mark Phillips and Princess Anne, two British royal Olympians that competed in equestrian events

Multiple members of royal families from various countries, including reigning monarchs, have competed in the Olympic Games. Some, such as Constantine II, Harald V, and Felipe VI, competed before becoming monarchs. Abbie Pratt, Mark Phillips, Charlene, and Iñaki Urdangarin all competed before becoming royalty through marriage.

The tradition of royalty competing in the Olympics dates back to the Ancient Olympics, with leaders including King Varazdat of Armenia, Princess Cynisca of Sparta, and Emperor Nero of Rome all having competed. The first royals to compete in the modern Olympics appeared at the 1900 Summer Olympics in Paris, France. Abbie Pratt was the first royal to place in the top three at the modern Olympics, winning third place in the women's individual golf competition in 1900. (Note: Pratt is retroactively considered a bronze medalist, although medals were not awarded in all events at the 1900 Summer Olympics.) The most recent royal to compete in the Olympics is Saeed bin Maktoum bin Rashid Al Maktoum, who competed in the 2016 Summer Olympics.

The royal to compete the most times in the Olympics is Hubertus von Hohenlohe, who competed in the Winter Olympics six times. Five Olympians have come from the Spanish royal family, while four have come from the House of Glücksburg; Queen Sofía, who was a reserve member of the 1960 Greek dragon team, is a member of both families. Sheikha Maitha bint Mohammed Al Maktoum was the first woman to represent the United Arab Emirates at the Olympics, while Arunee Bhanubandh was the first woman to represent Thailand at the Olympics. Adegboyega Folaranmi Adedoyin, the son of the Remo Akarigbo William Adedoyin, is the only member of an African royal dynasty to have participated.

== List ==
Royal Olympians
| Olympian | Royal family | Country represented | Sport | Olympics | Olympic medal(s) | Ref. |
|---|---|---|---|---|---|---|
| Joseph, Prince de Caraman-Chimay | House of Riquet de Caraman | France | Fencing | 1900 Paris | None | |
| Freydoun Malkom | Malkom (Note: Freydoun Malkom was awarded the title of prince despite not being related to the Shah.) | Iran | Fencing | 1900 Paris | None | |
| Louis Napoléon Murat | Murat | France | Equestrianism | 1900 Paris | None | |
| Abbie Pratt | House of Karađorđević (by marriage) | France (Note: Although Pratt was an American, the International Olympic Committee recognizes her as having represented France because she played for the Dinard Golf Club.) | Golf | 1900 Paris | (bronze) Women's individual, 1900 | |
| Gabriele D'Annunzio | D'Annunzio (Note: Gabriele D'Annunzio was the Prince of Montenevoso as well as the duce of the short-lived Regency of Carnaro.) | Italy | Art competition | 1912 Stockholm | None | |
| Ernest zu Hohenlohe | Hohenlohe | Austria | Fencing | 1912 Stockholm | None | |
| Friedrich Karl of Prussia | House of Hohenzollern | Germany | Equestrianism | 1912 Stockholm | (bronze) Team jumping, 1912 | |
| Dmitri Pavlovich | House of Romanov | Russia | Equestrianism | 1912 Stockholm | None | |
| Olav V | House of Glücksburg | Norway | Sailing | 1928 Amsterdam | (gold) Six metre, 1928 | |
| Gustaf Adolf | House of Bernadotte | Sweden | Equestrianism | 1936 Berlin | None | |
| Mohammad Asif Shazada | Durrani dynasty | Afghanistan | Field hockey | 1936 Berlin | None | |
| Shuja ud-Din | Durrani dynasty | Afghanistan | Field hockey | 1936 Berlin | None | |
| Mohammad Sultan | Durrani dynasty | Afghanistan | Field hockey | 1936 Berlin | None | |
| Adegboyega Folaranmi Adedoyin | Anoko | (United Kingdom) Great Britain (Note: Prince Adedoyin represented Great Britain because Nigeria was not yet recognized by the International Olympic Committee in 1948.) | Athletics | 1948 London | None | |
| Constantin von Liechtenstein | House of Liechtenstein | Liechtenstein | Alpine skiing | 1948 St. Moritz | None | |
| Birabongse Bhanudej | Chakri dynasty | Thailand | Sailing | 1956 Melbourne; 1960 Rome; 1964 Tokyo; 1972 Munich | None | |
| Max von Hohenlohe | Hohenlohe-Langenburg | Liechtenstein | Alpine skiing | 1956 Cortina d'Ampezzo | None | |
| Constantine II of Greece | House of Glücksburg | Greece | Sailing | 1960 Rome | (gold) Dragon, 1960 | |
| Karni Singh | Bikaner | India | Shooting | 1960 Rome; 1964 Tokyo; 1968 Mexico City; 1972 Munich; 1980 Moscow | None | |
| Queen Sofía of Spain | House of Glücksburg (by birth); Spanish royal family (by marriage) | Greece | Sailing (Note: Sofía was a reserve member of the Greek dragon team and did not herself compete.) | 1960 Rome | None | |
| Aga Khan IV | Fatimid dynasty | Iran | Alpine skiing | 1964 Innsbruck | None | |
| Arunee Bhanubandh | Chakri dynasty (by marriage) | Thailand | Sailing | 1964 Tokyo | None | |
| Harald V | House of Glücksburg | Norway | Sailing | 1964 Tokyo; 1968 Mexico City; 1972 Munich | None | |
| Juan Carlos I | Spanish royal family | Spain | Sailing | 1972 Munich | None | |
| Mark Phillips | British royal family (by marriage) | (United Kingdom) Great Britain | Equestrianism | 1972 Munich; 1988 Seoul | (gold) Team eventing, 1972; (silver) Team eventing, 1988 | |
| Anne, Princess Royal | British royal family | (United Kingdom) Great Britain | Equestrianism | 1976 Montreal | None | |
| Hubertus von Hohenlohe | Hohenlohe-Langenburg | Mexico | Alpine skiing | 1984 Sarajevo; 1988 Calgary; 1992 Albertville; 1994 Lillehammer; 2010 Vancouver; 2014 Sochi | None | |
| Infanta Cristina of Spain | Spanish royal family | Spain | Sailing | 1988 Seoul | None | |
| Albert II, Prince of Monaco | House of Grimaldi | Monaco | Bobsleigh | 1988 Calgary; 1992 Albertville; 1994 Lillehammer; 1998 Nagano; 2002 Salt Lake City | None | |
| Felipe VI | Spanish royal family | Spain | Sailing | 1992 Barcelona | None | |
| Iñaki Urdangarin | Spanish royal family (by marriage) | Spain | Handball | 1992 Barcelona; 1996 Atlanta; 2000 Sydney | (bronze) Handball, 1996; (bronze) Handball, 2000 | |
| Pengiran Muda Abdul Hakeem | House of Bolkiah | Brunei | Shooting | 1996 Atlanta; 2000 Sydney | None | |
| Charlene, Princess of Monaco | House of Grimaldi (by marriage) | South Africa | Swimming | 2000 Sydney | None | |
| Princess Haya bint Hussein | Hashemites (by birth); House of Maktoum (by marriage) | Jordan | Equestrianism | 2000 Sydney | None | |
| Saeed bin Maktoum bin Rashid Al Maktoum | House of Maktoum | United Arab Emirates | Shooting | 2000 Sydney; 2004 Athens; 2008 Beijing; 2012 London; 2016 Rio de Janeiro | None | |
| Ahmed Al-Maktoum | House of Maktoum | United Arab Emirates | Shooting | 2004 Athens; 2008 Beijing | (gold) Men's double trap, 2004 | |
| Abdullah bin Mutaib Al Saud | House of Saud | Saudi Arabia | Equestrianism | 2008 Beijing; 2012 London | (bronze) Team jumping, 2012 | |
| Faisal Al-Shalan | House of Saud | Saudi Arabia | Equestrianism | 2008 Beijing | None | |
| Maitha bint Mohammed Al Maktoum | House of Al Falasi | United Arab Emirates | Taekwondo | 2008 Beijing | None | |
| Princess Nathalie | Sayn-Wittgenstein-Berleburg | Denmark | Equestrianism | 2008 Beijing; 2012 London | (bronze) Team dressage, 2008 | |
| Zara Tindall | British royal family | (United Kingdom) Great Britain | Equestrianism | 2012 London | (silver) Team eventing, 2012 | |
| Juma Al Maktoum | House of Maktoum | United Arab Emirates | Shooting | 2012 London | None | |
