= Sikiru =

Sikiru is a common masculine Nigerian given name. Notable people with the name include:

- Sikiru Adepoju (born 1950), Nigerian percussionist and recording artist
- Sikiru Adesina (1971–2016), Nigerian film actor, director and producer
- Sikiru Kayode Adetona (born 1934), Nigerian monarch
- Sikiru Adeyemi (born 1998), Nigerian sprinter
- Sikiru Ajibowu Adeyiga (born 1938), Nigerian monarch
- Sikuru Alimi (born 1942), Nigerian boxer
- Sikiru Alimi (footballer) (born 1996), Nigerian international footballer
- Sikiru Ololade Ayinde Balogun, known as Ayinde Barrister (1948–2010), Nigerian-born Yoruba singer-songwriter, songproducer and music performer
- Sikiru Olatunbosun (born 1996), Nigerian footballer
