= Adebutu =

- Language(s): Yoruba

Origin
- Word/name: Nigeria
- Meaning: the man of courage

Adebutu is a surname. Notable people with the surname include:

- Segun Adebutu (born 1974), Nigerian businessman, economist, and philanthropist
- Oladipupo Olatunde Adebutu (born 1962), Nigerian politician
