= Awujale =

Royal title

Awujale is the royal title of the monarch of the Ijebu Kingdom. The holder is addressed as the Awujale of Ijebuland. The most recent Awujale was Oba Sikiru Kayode Adetona Ogbagba II, who served as the Awujale from 1960 until his death in 2025. He was from the House of Anikinaiya.

By the declaration made under section 4(2) of the Chiefs Law 1957 of the Customary Law regulating the selection of the Awujale of Ijebuland Chieftaincy, there are four ruling houses:

1. House of Gbelegbuwa
2. House of Anikinaiya
3. House of Fusengbuwa
4. House of Fidipote

The Declaration was approved 25 August 1959 and registered on 1 September 1959.

== Background ==
According to one tradition, the title Awujale originated from the nickname Amujaile, meaning a person who understands the art of wrestling on land. This nickname was given to Obanta (Ogborogan) after he reached a village ruled by a chief named Olu-Igbo, who refused him passage, and the issue was resolved by a wrestling march between them in which Obanta was victorious.

== List of Awujales ==
Multiple regnal lists are known to exist, each containing some differences in the number and order of reigns. The succession of Awujale passed between four dynastic branches from the 15th century to the present day.

=== Revised Chronology (2017) ===
The following list is based on a revised chronology by Tunde Oduwobi. This list is mostly based on an earlier list by Badejo Adebonojo in 1947, with the exception that it adds the name Boyejo who died shortly after assuming office and was excluded from Adebonojo's list. Regnal lengths have also been adopted from Adebonojo from the reign of Tewogbuwa onwards.

Names with the ♀ symbol are female rulers.

Revised Chronology (Oduwobi, 2017)
No.	Name	Reign dates	Regnal length (Years)	Dynastic Branch
1	Obanta	1450–1465	15	1
2	Obaguru	1465–1475	10	2
3	Munigbuwa	1475–1480	5	3
4	Obanla	1480–1490	10	1
5	Obaloja	1490–1502	12	2
6	Obalofin	1502–1516	14	3
7	Apasa	1516–1528	12	1
8	Obaganju	1528–1536	8	2
9	Tewogboye	1536–1540	4	3
10	Obaruwa	1540–1549	9	1
11	Ofiran	1549–1552	3	2
12	Lapengbuwa	1552–1557	5	1
13	Otutubiosun	1557–1560	3	3
14	Ajuwakale	1560–1572	12	3
15	Gbadisa	1572–1581	9	1
16	Obajewo	1581–1596	15	2
17	Elewu Ileke	1596–1610	14	3
18	Olumodan	1610–1640	30	1
19	Mase	1640–1645	5	2
20	Olutoyese	1645–1655	10	3
21	Mola (Omila)	1655–1662	7	1/4
22	Ajana	1662–1664	2	1
23	Ore-Yeye ♀	1664–1674	10	2
24	Agunwaja	1674–1680	6	1
25	Jadiara	1680–1695	15	3
26	Sapoku	1695–1707	12	2
27	Folajoye	1707–1712	5	4
28	Mekun	1712–1722	10	3
29	Gbodogi	1722–1730	8	2
30	Ojigi Moyegeso	1730–1745	15	4
31	Boyejo	1745	0	1
32	Oniyewe	1745–1750	5	3
33	Olope Oluyoruwa	1750–1755	5	2
34	Ayora	1755–1765	10	1
35	Fesojoye	1765–1769	4	3
36	Ore-Geje ♀	1769–1770	1	2
37	Sapenuwa Rubakoye	1770–1775	5	2
38	Orodudujoye	1775–1778	3	1
39	Tewogbuwa	1778–1780	2	3
40	Gbelegbuwa	1780–1790	10	1
41	Fusengbuwa	1790–1820	30	3
42	Setejoye	1820–1821	1	4
43	Anikilaya	1821–1854	33	2
44	Fidipote	1854–1885	31	4
45	Tunwase	1886–1895	9	3
46	Adeleke	1895–1906	9	2
47	Adeona	1906–1915	9	4
48	Adekoya	1916	0	3
49	Ademolu	1916–1925	9	2
50	Adenuga	1925–1929	4	3
51	Ogunnaike	1929–1933	4	4
52	Adesanya	1933–1959	26	1
53	Adetona	1960–2025	65	2

=== Dynastic Chart ===
The following chart was recorded in Tunde Oduwobi's "The Age and Kings of the Ijebu Kingdom" (2017). It is based on the genealogical list recorded by Adenbonojo below (List D).

The chart shows a succession cycle of three original lineal branches deriving from Obanta and the next two successors. A particular branch could occasionally be bypassed. The accession of Lapengbuwa (no. 12) is the first recorded instance of this occurring, when succession passed from branch 2 back to branch 1 instead of 3. The royal status of a branch could lapse if there were no eligible candidates at its turn in the succession cycle, though the sole example of this centered on Gbelegbuwa (no. 40). A new branch may form if two kings were siblings and were succeeded by their respective offspring. During the colonial period, lineal branches were converted to "ruling houses", each named after a dynastic ancestor whose descendants would be considered in the selection process for the next Awujale.

Branch I	Branch II	Branch III	Branch IV
(1); Obanta r. 1450–1465	(2); Obaguru r. 1465–1475	(3); Munigbuwa r. 1475–1480
(4); Obanla r. 1480–1490	(5); Obaloja r. 1490–1502	(6); Obalofin r. 1502–1516
(7); Apasa r. 1516–1528	(8); Obagunju r. 1528–1536	(9); Tewobogye r. 1536–1540
(10); Obaruwa r. 1540–1549	(11); Ofiran r. 1549–1552	(13); Otutubiosun r. 1557–1560	(14); Ajuwakale r. 1560–1572
(12); Lapengbuwa r. 1552–1557	(16); Obajewo r. 1581–1596	(17); Elewu Ileke r. 1596–1610
(15); Gbadisa r. 1572–1581	(19); Mase r. 1640–1645	(20); Olutoyese r. 1645–1655
(18); Olumodan r. 1610–1640	(21); Mola (*); Branch IV	(23); Ore-Yeye ♀ r. 1664–1674	(25); Jadiara r. 1680–1695	(21); Mola r. 1655–1662
(22); Ajana r. 1662–1664	(26); Sapoku r. 1695–1707	(28); Mekun r. 1712–1722	(27); Folajoye r. 1707–1712
(24); Agunwaja r. 1674–1680	(29); Gbodogi r. 1722–1730	(32); Oniyewe r. 1745–1750	(30); Ojibi Moyegeso r. 1730–1745
(31); Boyejo r. 1745–1745	(34); Ayora r. 1755–1765	(33); Olope Oluyoruwa r. 1750–1755	(35); Fesojoye r. 1765–1769	(42); Setejoye r. 1820–1821
(38); Orodudujoye r. 1775–1778	(36); Ore-Geje ♀ r. 1769–1770	(37); Sapenuwa Rubakoye r. 1770–1775	(39); Tewogbuwa r. 1778–1780	(44); Fidipote r. 1854–1885
(40); Gbeleguwa r. 1780–1790	(43); Anikilaya r. 1821–1854	(41); Fusengbuwa r. 1790–1820	(47); Adeona r. 1906–1915	(51); Ogunnaike r. 1929–1933
(52); Adesanya r. 1933–1959	(49); Ademolu r. 1916–1925	(46); Adeleke r. 1895–1906	(45); Tunwase r. 1886–1895
(53); Adetona r. 1960–2025

=== Regnal lists ===
At least four regnal lists have been recorded based on oral tradition from the late 19th to the mid 20th centuries. There is some disagreement in the order and names of rulers, and not all lists include dates or reign lengths.

The following table uses lists from the following sources:

- List A – Tables of Principal Events in Yoruba History (1893) by John Otonba Payne. Payne was a grandson of king Gbelegbuwa, who is the first king on his list. Payne's primary concern with writing his list was to collect data that could be used judicial purposes, and therefore was more interested in contemporary information than exploring the past.
- List B – Ancient Ijebu-Ode (1937) by J.A. Olusola. Olusala was an editor of Ibeju Weekly News (1933–1940). His book compiled various records of the colonial era. Awujale Adesanya submitted this king list to a panel who were considering the demands of the Remo people for administrative independence in 1937. Olusola added an additional name to the list, who was the then-current Awujale.
- List C – Iwi Kini Ilosiwaju Wko Itan Ijebu (A Study of Ijebu History, Book I) by Odubanjo Odutola (1946). Odutola was well-known in the 1940s for his knowledge of local history and appeared in court litigations on behalf of the Awujale as his official historian.
- List D – Itan Ido Ijebu (A History of Ijebu) by Badejo Adebonojo (1947). The actual author of this book was Badejo's father Samuel Adebonojo, who was an ex-officio member of the Awujale's cabinet. The compilation of the book ended in 1947, but his son Badejo later made additions and inserted the then-current Awujale to the list. This list is notable for including reign dates for rulers before Gbelegbuwa and is also a genealogical list showing the lineages of the different rulers.

During the period up to Tewogbuwa, there are only thirteen names that are in some agreement across these lists.

Comparison of regnal lists (1893–1947) against revised chronology (2017) Names with the ♀ symbol are female rulers.
Name	List A (Payne, 1893)		List B (Olusola, 1937)		List C (Odutola, 1946)		List D (Adebonojo, 1947)		Revised List (Oduwobi, 2017)		Notes
Name	Order	Dates	Order	Dates	Order	Dates	Order	Dates	Order	Dates	Notes
Olu-Iwa	–	–	1	–	–	–	–	–	–	–	Tunde Oduwobi suggested these two names may be fictive characters. However, tradition states that Olu-Iwa led the first migration to Ijebu, accompanied by two warrior companions named Ajebu and Olode. He was the grandfather of Obanta/Ogborogan through his daughter Gborowo. Oshin/Oshi was the son of Ajebu who ruled as regent after Olu-Iwa's death.
Oshi	–	–	2	–	–	–	–	–	–	–	Tunde Oduwobi suggested these two names may be fictive characters. However, tradition states that Olu-Iwa led the first migration to Ijebu, accompanied by two warrior companions named Ajebu and Olode. He was the grandfather of Obanta/Ogborogan through his daughter Gborowo. Oshin/Oshi was the son of Ajebu who ruled as regent after Olu-Iwa's death.
Obanta	–	–	3	–	1	–	1	1430	1	1450	
Oba-Guru (B, C); Obaguru (D, Revised)	–	–	5	–	3	–	2	1445	2	1465	
Monigbuwa (B); Monibgbuwa (C); Munigbuwa (D, Revised)	–	–	4	–	2	–	3	1455	3	1475	
Obanla	–	–	–	–	–	–	4	1460	4	1480	
Oba-Loja (B, C); Obaloja (D, Revised)	–	–	6	–	4	–	5	1470	5	1490	
Oba-Lofin (B, C); Obalofin (D, Revised)	–	–	7	–	5	–	6	1482	6	1502	
Oba-Apasa (B, C); Apasa (D, Revised)	–	–	8	–	6	–	7	1496	7	1516	
Oba-Ganju (C); Obaganju (D, Revised)	–	–	11	–	7	–	8	1508	8	1528	
Tolumbogboye (B, C); Tewogboye (D, Revised)	–	–	12	–	8	–	9	1516	9	1536	
Obaruwa (B, D, Revised); Obaruwa (Arunwa) (C)	–	–	10	–	10	–	10	1520	10	1540	Consistently named as the tenth Awujale on all lists. His appellation is ekewa olu meaning "the tenth king". Traditionally remembered as a "warrior king" who established the dynasties of Ode and Makun at Remo.
Oba-Ofiran (B, C); Ofiran (D, Revised)	–	–	9	–	9	–	11	1529	11	1549	
Lapengbuwa (B, Revised); Lapeguwa (D)	–	–	13	–	–	–	12	1532	12	1552	The absence of this ruler on list C may be because his accession was the first major disruption in the succession chain.
Otutu (B); Otutubiosun (C, Revised); Owa Otutubiosun (D)	–	–	14	–	12	–	13	1537	13	1557	His brother Ajukawale usurped the throne.
Ajuwakale	–	–	15	–	13	–	14	1540	14	1560	
Adisa (B); Oba-Adisa (C); Gbadisa (D, Revised)	–	–	16	–	11	–	15	1552	15	1572	
Jewo (B); Oba-Jewo (C); Obajewo (D, Revised)	–	–	17	–	14	–	16	1561	16	1581	
Elewu-Ilke (B); Elewuileke (C); Obalewuileke (D); Elewu Ileke (Revised)	–	–	18	–	15	–	17	1576	17	1596	
Olumodan (B, C, Revised); Obalumodan Elewu (D)	–	–	21	–	17	–	18	1590	18	1610	Brother of Mase.
Mase	–	–	22	–	21	–	19	1620	19	1640	Brother of Olumodan.
Olutunoyese (B); Olutoyese (C, Revised); Olotuneso (D)	–	–	20	–	18	–	20	1625	20	1645	
Mola (D); Mola (Omila) (Revised)	–	–	–	–	–	–	21	1635	21	1655	
Ajana (B); Ajano (C)	–	–	19	–	25	–	22	1642	22	1662	
Ore-Yeye ♀ (B, C, Revised); Ore ♀ (D)	–	–	23	–	16	–	23	1644	23	1664	
Agunwaja (B, C, Revised); Obaguwaja (D)	–	–	24	–	19	–	24	1654	24	1674	
Jadiyara (B); Jadiara (C, D, Revised)	–	–	25	–	20	–	25	1660	25	1680	
Asapo-kun (B); Sapo-Oku (C); Sapokun (D); Sapoku (Revised)	–	–	26	–	22	–	26	1675	26	1695	
Afola (B); Afolajoye (C); Folajoye (D, Revised)	–	–	27	–	23	–	27	1687	27	1707	
Omila	–	–	28	–	24	–	–	–	–	–	
Mekun	–	–	29	–	26	–	28	1692	28	1712	
Gbogidi (B, C, D); Gbodogi (Revised)	–	–	30	–	27	–	29	1702	29	1722	
Moyegso (B, C); Ojigi Moyegeso (D, Revised)	–	–	41	–	37	–	30	1710	30	1730	
Boyejo	–	–	40	–	35	–	–	–	31	1745	The absence of Boyego in list D may be due to his "aberrant succession" in which, according to tradition, he refused to be properly installed and also did not have a male child. He may have died shortly after his accession. Boyego belonged to a dynastic branch that had already been skipped once in the succession cycle.
Oniyewe (B, Revised); Oniyewe ♀ (C); Obaliyewe (D)	–	–	39	–	36	–	31	1725	32	1745	List C specifies the gender of Oniyewe as female but list B has the ruler as male. Tunde Oduwobi argued that this ruler was probably male, because only one list has the name as female.
Olope (B, C); Olope Oluyoruwa (D, Revised)	–	–	34	–	30	–	32	1730	33	1750	These two rulers are combined as one person on list D. Tunde Oduwobi theorised the standalone appearance of this name on lists C and D, both directly after the female ruler Ore-Geje, is a duplication of a tradition about Sapenuwa, who succeeded his sister.
Oluyoruwa (B, C); Olope Oluyoruwa (D, Revised)	–	–	32	–	29	–	32	1730	33	1750	These two rulers are combined as one person on list D. Tunde Oduwobi theorised the standalone appearance of this name on lists C and D, both directly after the female ruler Ore-Geje, is a duplication of a tradition about Sapenuwa, who succeeded his sister.
Muwagona	–	–	33	–	–	–	–	–	–	–	Possibly a duplicate of Monigbwa, successor of Obanta.
Ayora (B, C, Revised); Oljara (D)	–	–	35	–	31	–	33	1735	34	1755	
Fesojoye	–	–	36	–	–	–	34	1745	35	1765	
Ore-Geje ♀ (B, C, Revised); Geje ♀ (D)	–	–	31	–	28	–	35	1749	36	1769	She had no direct successors.
Rubakoye ♀ (B, C); Saponuwa Rubakoya (D, Revised)	–	–	37	–	32	–	36	1750	37	1770	Rubakoye is listed as a female ruler on lists B and C, but not on D. List D combines Rubakoye and Sapenuwa as one person. Sapenuwa is preceded by a female ruler in lists B, C and D due to a tradition that he was a successor to a sister. Tunde Oduwobi theorised there were only two female Awujales, Ore-Yeye and Ore-Geje, and noted that "Ore" is a generic term for "mother". He believed that Rubakoye and Geje "reflect a single character". Sapenuwa was a son of Olope and brother of Geje.
Sapen-nuwa (B); Sapenuwa (C); Sapnuwa Rubakoya (D, Revised)	–	–	38	–	33	–	36	1750	37	1770	Rubakoye is listed as a female ruler on lists B and C, but not on D. List D combines Rubakoye and Sapenuwa as one person. Sapenuwa is preceded by a female ruler in lists B, C and D due to a tradition that he was a successor to a sister. Tunde Oduwobi theorised there were only two female Awujales, Ore-Yeye and Ore-Geje, and noted that "Ore" is a generic term for "mother". He believed that Rubakoye and Geje "reflect a single character". Sapenuwa was a son of Olope and brother of Geje.
Orodudu-joye (B); Orodudujoye (C, D, Revised)	–	–	42	–	34	–	37	1755	38	1775	
Atewogbuwa (B, C); Tewogbuwa (D, Revised)	–	–	43	–	38	–	38	1758	39	1778	From this point onwards all lists are in agreement on the succession of kings due to his successors' reigns still being in living memory at the time of the commencement of documentation under British rule over Yorubaland.
Gbelegbua (A); Gbelegbuwa I (B, D); Gbelegbuwa (C, Revised)	1	c. 1760	44	1760	39	1760	39	1760	40	1780	According to a genealogical chart prepared by the family of Gbelegbuwa in 1930, there were seven abidagbaa born to him during his reign.
Fusengbua (A); Fusengbuwa (B, C, D, Revised)	2	c. 1790	45	1790	40	1790	40	1790	41	1790	
Setejoye	3	c. 1819	46	1819	41	1819	41	1820	42	1820	
Anikilaya (A, Revised); Figbajoye Anikilaya (B); Fugbajoye-Anikilaya (C); Anikinaiya (D)	4	c. 1820	47	1820	42	1820	42	1821	43	1821	
Ademiyewo (A); Ademuyewo Fidipote (B, C); Fidipote (D, Revised)	5	c. 1852	48	1852	43	1852	43	1850	44	1854	
Aboki (A); Adesimbo Tunwase (Aboki) (B); Adesimbo-Tunwase (C); Tuwase (D); Tunwase (Revised)	6	1886	49	1886	44	1886	44	1886	45	1886	
Adeleke Ogbagba (B, C); Ogbagba I (D); Adeleke (Revised)	–	–	50	1895	45	1895	45	1895	46	1895	Son of Anikilaya.
Adeona Fusigboye (B, C); Fusigboye (D); Adeona (Revised)	–	–	51	1906	46	1906	46	1906	47	1906	
Fusogbade (first reign) (D)	–	–	–	–	–	–	47	1916	–	–	
Adekoya Eleruja (B, C); Adekoya (D, Revised)	–	–	52	–	47	1916	48	1916	48	1916	
Ademolu Fesogbade (B, C); Fesogbade (second reign) (D); Ademolu (Revised)	–	–	53	1915	48	1915	49	1917	49	1916	
Adenuga Folagbade (B, C); Adenuga (D, Revised)	–	–	54	1925	49	1925	50	1925	50	1925	
Ogunnaike Fibiwoga (B, C); Fibiwoga (D); Ogunnaike (Revised)	–	–	55	1929	50	1929	51	1929	51	1929	
Dan. Adesanya Gbelegbuwa II (B); Gbelegbuwa II (D); Adesanya (Revised)	–	–	56	1933	–	–	52	1933	52	1933	Heavily favoured for succession by local British officers because he was literate. Died in February 1959.
Sikiru Adetona Ogbagba II (B); Ogbagba II (D); Adetona (Revised)	–	–	57	1959	–	–	53	1960	53	1960	Was 25 years old at the time of his accession and was asked to return from England where he had been studying accountancy since arriving there in January 1959. He assumed office in January 1960.

== Bibliography ==
- Oduwobi, Tunde (2017). "The Age and Kings of the Ijebu Kingdom". In Akinyele, A.T. (ed.). History and Diplomacy: Essays in Honour of Ade Adefuye. New Jersey: Goldline and Jacobs. pp. 48–70.
- Ogunkoya, T.O. (1956). "The Early History of Ijebu". Journal of the Historical Society of Nigeria. 1 (1): 48–58.
