= Otutubiosun =

- Awujale of Ijebu Kingdom
- Reign: 1537–1540 or 1557–1560
- Predecessor: Lapengbuwa or Oba-Adisa
- Successor: Ajuwakale
- Born: Ijebu Kingdom, Nigeria
- Died: Ijebu Kingdom, Nigeria
- Father: Tewogboye
- Religion: Yoruba religion

Otutubiosun (sometimes known as Owa Otutubiosun or Otutu) was a king (Awujale) of the Ijebu kingdom who reigned in the 16th century. He never completed his reign because his brother Ajuwakale usurped the throne from him.

== Background ==
=== Line of succession ===
Otutubiosun was a son of Awujale Tewogboye. His father reigned during 1516–1520, according to a regnal list recorded by Badejo Adebonojo, or 1536–1540 according to the "revised chronology" of Tunde Oduwobi.

The line of succession of the Awujale passed between multiple branches rather than being passed directly from father-to-son via primogeniture. Otutubiosun therefore did not directly succeed his father. According to regnal list recorded by J.A. Olusola in 1937, only one Awujale reigned between him and his father. However a later list recorded in 1946 by Odubanjo Odutola instead placed four different rulers between their respective reigns. A list recorded by Samuel Adebonojo in 1947 numbered Otutubiosun as the thirteenth Awujale while his father was numbered ninth. Unlike the earlier lists, Adebonojo's list provided years of rule for individual rulers, and stated that Otutubiosun ascended to the throne 17 years after the death of his father, giving his years of rule as 1537–1540. The "revised" chronology of Tunde Oduwobi instead moves his reign twenty years later to 1557–1560.

While there is some discrepancy between the different regnal list on who preceded Otutubiosun, all lists are in agreement that he was followed by his brother Ajuwakale.

=== Deposition ===
After three years of rule, Otutubiosun became infected with a skin disease and had to leave for the countryside to be treated. His brother Ajuwakale was called to act as regent but refused to relinquish his office when he returned. Otutubiosun was implored to accept the situation and retired to the countryside where he founded a new settlement named Idowa with the dynastic title of Dagburewe. He was given half of the royal possessions when he left, including six okute effigies out of the twelve available, which represented earlier rulers.

Tunde Oduwobi noted that the existence of twelve okute effigies at the time of Awujakale's usurpation of the throne suggests that Otutubiosun was the thirteenth Awujale. The regnal list recorded by Adebonojo in 1947 has Otutubiosun as the thirteenth Awujale, therefore Oduwobi believed that this list was the most accurate. By comparison, the lists recorded by Olusola in 1937 and Odutola in 1946 list Otutubiosun as the fourteenth and twelfth Awujale respectively.

== Bibliography ==
- Oduwobi, Tunde (2017). "The Age and Kings of the Ijebu Kingdom". In Akinyele, A.T. (ed.). History and Diplomacy: Essays in Honour of Ade Adefuye. New Jersey: Goldline and Jacobs. pp. 48–70.
