= Remo people =

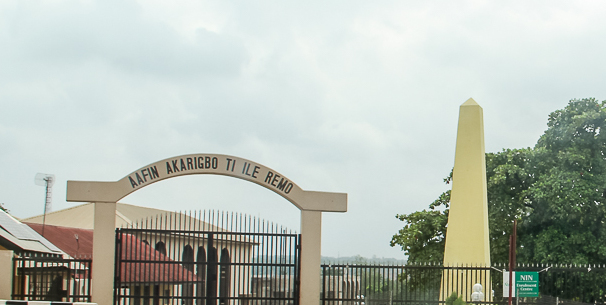
Palace of Akarigbo of Remo Land

The Remo people are a distinct subgroup of the Yoruba ethnic group in Nigeria, primarily residing in the Remo region of Ogun State. They are known for their rich cultural traditions, distinct dialect, and contributions to the socio-economic landscape. The people occupy towns including Makun, Offin, Emuren, Ikenne, and about twenty-nine other towns neighboring the Ijebu Kingdom in Nigeria. The capital is Sagamu, which was settled in 1872 when thirteen towns congregated together for greater security.

Remoland was initially settled roughly around the second half of the 15th century, and they claim their ancestry from Iremo in Ile Ife. Although there is a strong homogeneity in culture with their neighbor the Ijebu Kingdom, they did not consider themselves part of the Ijebu Kingdom, at least based on recent history. They have had their own kingdom called Remoland with their own dominant ruling family since around the early 16th century.

What follows is a list of holders of the title Akarigbo of Remo, the oba or kings of Remoland.

== Kings of Remo ==
1. Akarigbo
2. Aroyewun
3. Odusote (Kilaro)
4. Radolu
5. Koyelu
6. Muleruwa
7. Torungbuwa I
8. Anoko
9. Liyangu
10. Otutubiosun
11. Erinjugbotan
12. Faranpojo the Great (Responsible for the relocation of the capital from Remo to Shagamu, during the Yoruba Wars mid 19th century)
13. Igimisoje
14. Dueja
15. Oyebajo
16. William Adedoyin
17. Awolesi
18. Adeniyi (also known as Sonariwo)
19. Babatunde Adewale Ajayi, Torungbuwa II Present Oba
