= William Adedoyin =

Nigerian Traditional ruler

- Akarigbo of Remo
- Reign: 1916–1952
- Predecessor: Oyebajo Torungbuwa
- House: Anoko

HRM Oba William Christopher Adedoyin (died 1952) was a Nigerian traditional ruler who held the title of Akarigbo of Remo Kingdom from 1916 to 1952.

The Akarigbo's seat was in Sagamu, part of Remo Kingdom, a Yoruba plural society consisting of over 44 Towns.

== Early life ==
Adedoyin was born in the late 1870s to the Anoko royal family of Ofin, Sagamu. He was a descendant of Akarigbo Igimisoje, a key founder of Sagamu. Adedoyin grew up with his mother in a village south of Sagamu helping her with her trade, selling foodstuff in Lagos. He attended Wesley College, Sagamu and completed his primary education with the Methodists in Lagos. After completing primary education, he briefly apprenticed as a tailor before he found work as a clerk to Christopher Sapara Williams. Williams, a pioneer Nigerian lawyer, introduced Adedoyin to many Lagos elites and the influence of Williams in his life led him to adopt the name Christopher William. In 1903, he returned to Remoland where he worked as a tailor, a farmer and public letter writer. In 1905, he acted as a clerk for Akàrígbò Oyebajo Torungbuwa.

== Akarigbo ==
During the late Nineteenth century, the traditional rulers of many Yoruba towns were advised by powerful chiefs and had to cooperate with the chiefs and members of the Osugbo society to have a smooth administration. This situation was still present in the Ijebu-Remo of 1916 and contributed to Adedoyin's ascendancy. He was chosen as Akarigbo in 1916 over the displaced Oba Oyebajo Torungbuwa, his former boss, who was forced to abdicate in 1915, an outcome of Oyebajo's disagreement with some chiefs and the colonial resident. After Oyebajo left, his adversaries selected Awoloesi who did not last long on the throne before his death in February 1916. Adedoyin, a clerk and letter writer, originally supported Oyebajo against the chiefs but as a young and literate man who could reason with the British, important chiefs backed him for the throne against the return of Oyebajo and Adedoyin joined the camp of Oyebajo's opponents. He was crowned Akarigbo in September 1916.

Adedoyin, a Methodist convert, supported the spread of the Christian branch and the provision of Western education in Remoland. In both activities, he was ably supported by William Frederick Mellor, a Methodist missionary who was also friendly with some of the local colonial residents. Adedoyin also supported infrastructural development such as a road linking Remo to Ikorodu. However, his administration was known for its determination to split Remoland from Ijebu Province, which had made the Akarigbo and many Remo towns subordinate to the headship of the Awujale of Ijebu under the notion of indirect rule. He was able to rally Remo residents to support independence from Ijebu, and also used the support to consolidate his position within Remoland. In 1938, the colonial government gave Remo financial and political autonomy and made Akarigbo a paramount ruler in the region. Adedoyin's new position gave him some political control in the activities of the Remo Native Administration, the local appeals court, the migrant area of Sabo, South of Sagamu, and the police, making him the leading political figure in Remoland.

One of William's sons, Adegboyega Folaranmi Adedoyin, was the first Nigerian to compete in the Olympic Games.

== Sources ==
- Oduwobi, Tunde (January 2003). "Deposed Rulers under the Colonial Regime in Nigeria". Cahiers d'Études Africaines. 43 (171): 553–571. doi:10.4000/etudesafricaines.215.
- Nolte, Insa (2003). Obafemi Awolowo and the making of Remo: the local politics of a Nigerian [sic] nationalist. International African Library 40. Edinburgh University Press.
