= Sikiru Kayode Adetona =

Nigerian monarch (1934–2025)

Ọba Sikiru Kayọde Adetọna GCON, Ọgbagba Agbotewole II
- Awùjalẹ̀
- Reign: 2 April 1960 – 13 July 2025
- Coronation: 2 April 1960
- Predecessor: Ọba Daniel Adesanya, Gbelegbuwa
- Born: 10 May 1934; Imupa, Ijebu-Ode, Southern Region, British Nigeria (now in Ogun State, Nigeria)
- Died: 13 July 2025 (aged 91)
- Spouses: Iyabọ Oke; Modupe Ẹkundayọ; Oluwakẹmi Dodo-Williams
- Issue: 9
Names
- Sikiru Olukayọde Adetọna
Regnal name
- Ọgbagba Agbotewole II
- House: Anikinaiya or Anikilaya
- Father: Rufai Adetọna Adeleke
- Mother: Ajibabi Adetọna (née Ọnaṣhile)

Ọba Sikiru Kayọde Adetọna (10 May 1934 – 13 July 2025) was the Awùjalẹ̀ of the Ijẹbu Kingdom, a traditional state in Nigeria. He was installed as the king on 2 April 1960, which made him one of the longest reigning monarchs in Nigeria. Adetona was a member of the House of Anikinaiya.

== Early life ==
Ọba Sikiru Olukayọde Adetọna, Ọgbagba Agbotewole II, was born on 10 May 1934, into the Royal House of Anikinaiya of Ijẹbuland in his father's house in Imupa, Ijebu Ode. His father was Prince Rufai Adetọna Adeleke (born c. 1902), a son of Ọba Adeleke, Ọgbagba Agbotewole I (c. 1825–1906), who was the Awujalẹ of Ijẹbuland from 1895 to 1906. His mother was Ajibabi Ọnaṣile, who was from the town of Ijebu Igbo. The founder of the Royal House of Anikinaiya (or Anikilaya) was his great-grandfather Oba Anikilaya, Figbajoye Agboogunsa I, (c. 1775–1854) who reigned from 1821 to 1854, and who himself was a son of Ọba Gbelegbuwa. As a member of the Royal House of Anikinaiya, his paternal family claimed descent from Olu-Iwa, the semi-legendary first Awujalẹ and Ọbanta, another founder of the Ijẹbu kingdom.

== Education ==
Prince Adetọna attended various Baptist Schools, Ereko, Ijẹbu-Ode; Ogbere United Primary School, Oke Agbo, Ijẹbu-Igbo; and Ansar-Ud-Deen School, Ijebu-Ode between 1943 and 1950. For his secondary education, he attended Olu-Iwa (now Adeola Odutọla) College, Ijebu-Ode from 1951 to 1956. Between 1957 and 1958 he took up an appointment with the then Audit Department of the Western Region, Ibadan.

The prince resigned his appointment in 1958 to pursue further studies in accountancy in the United Kingdom, which was the colonial ruler of Nigeria at the time.

== Rise to the throne ==
By a letter dated 4 January 1960, referenced CB. 4 1/333, the Permanent Secretary in the Western Region Ministry of Local Government conveyed to the Local Government Adviser in Ijẹbu Ode approval of the Western Region Governor in Council, the appointment of Prince Sikiru Kayode Adetona as king, and his confirmation as the new Awujale of Ijebuland with effect from that date (4 January 1960). It became the lot of Ijẹbu notables like the late Ọgbẹni-Ọja, Chief (Dr.) Timothy Adeọla Odutọla, Bọbasuwa I, Chief Emmanuel Okusanya Okunọwọ (MBE, KFNM); and Aṣiwaju, Chief Samuel Ọlatubọsun Ṣhonibare to arrange for the home-coming of the King-elect. On 18 January 1960, the Head of the Ijẹbu Ode Regency Council, the Ọgbeni-Ọja, Chief Timothy Adeọla Odutọla formally presented the new traditional ruler to the whole world. This presentation, which was a novelty, signalled the commencement of the installation ceremonies of the king-elect. It was indeed, a new dawn in the annals of the Ijẹbu people. The king-elect thereafter proceeded to undergo the traditional seclusion at the Odo for three months.

Oba Sikiru Kayọde Adetọna, who had earlier been nominated along with five others by the ODIS was unanimously selected by the kingmakers in conformity with Section 11 of the Chiefs Law of 1957 applicable in Western Region. The then Governor signed the Instrument of Office approving Prince Sikiru Kayọde Adetọna as Awujalẹ of Ijẹbuland. The formal coronation took place on Saturday, 2 April 1960.

On 5 April 1960, newly crowned Ọba Adetọna took his seat as a member of the Western Region House of Chiefs, after a formal introduction. Ọba Sikiru Kayọde Adetọna was a charismatic Prince, and some Ọbas and Chiefs nominated him for the presidency of the House of Chiefs, albeit, an older and traditionally more senior Ọba, the late Sir Adesọji Aderẹmi, Ọni of Ifẹ was subsequently elected the President. The thought here was that early as a monarch, the twenty-six-year-old Awujalẹ was a fit and proper king for the exalted position. No doubt, this consideration was an admission of the uniqueness of the Awujalẹ of Ijẹbuland.

== Throne deposition and comeback ==
On 23 November 1981, Governor Victor Olabisi Onabanjo of Ogun State signed a formal order suspending Oba Sikiru Adetona from office as the Awujale of Ijebuland until further notice. However, it soon turned to a deposition as the removal was scheduled to take effect on 2 January 1984.

But the Muhammadu Buhari coup of 31 December 1983, which toppled President Shehu Shagari's civilian government, halted the plan. Buhari's intervention inadvertently preserved the Awujale's reign for the next 41 years.

By the early 1980s, Oba Sikiru Kayode Adetona, the Awujale of Ijebuland, and Governor Victor “Bisi” Onabanjo, both sons of Ijebu, had entered a tense phase. The foundation had been set years earlier, when Adetona had generously assisted Onabanjo during his illness and even provided accommodation and support while he studied in London. Yet as politics took centre stage, friendship gave way to rivalry, and personal ire would lead to a constitutional crisis.

In August 1981, Oba Adetona wrote to the governor notifying him of his upcoming trip to London for medical reasons, including his overseas address and phone number, purely informative, not requesting permission. Onabanjo replied, demanding more details of the trip and the health grounds, apparently implying that it needed his approval.

Oba Adetona bristled, reminding him that his letter was purely a courtesy update and that, as a traditional monarch, he did not require permission to travel. Defiant, he departed anyway, changing his phone number to avoid further contact.

On 23 November 1981, Governor Onabanjo issued a proclamation suspending the Awujale from office, an unprecedented move. He established a Commission of Inquiry under Justice Solomon O. Sogbetun to investigate Oba Adetona's perceived insubordination and administrative conduct.

True to the governor's intentions, the commission reported unfavourably, and by early 1982, the Awujale was formally deposed by the Ogun State Executive Council.

Oba Sikiru Kayode Adetona mounted a legal challenge against the Ogun State Government, contesting the validity of the Sogbetun Commission of Inquiry, which had recommended his deposition. His legal team was formidable, led by none other than Chief F.R.A. Williams, one of Nigeria's greatest legal minds, and supported by Chief Sina Odedina, a prominent Ijebu lawyer.

As the case made its way through the courts, political events moved with dramatic speed. Governor Bisi Onabanjo, the man who had orchestrated the deposition, was re-elected and sworn in for a second term on 1 October 1983. For a time, it appeared that the Awujale's fate had been sealed.

But destiny, always patient, waited quietly in the wings.

Just two months and 30 days later, on 31 December 1983, the Nigerian Second Republic collapsed in a swift military coup. In a broadcast, Brigadier Sani Abacha announced the takeover of the government by the military.

The democratically elected administration of President Shehu Shagari was overthrown, and Major-General Muhammadu Buhari assumed the role of Head of State.

In Ogun State, Brigadier Oladipo Diya, a fellow Ijebu son from Odogbolu, was appointed the new Military Governor. The terrain had shifted.

Then, in 1984, the defining moment arrived.

Justice Kolawole of the Ogun State High Court delivered a landmark judgment. The court nullified the findings of the Sogbetun Commission and ruled that Oba Adetona's deposition was unlawful. It ordered his immediate reinstatement to the stool of the Awujale of Ijebuland.

The military administration of Brigadier Diya, rather than appeal the ruling, respected the court's decision. Without drama or delay, the judgment was enforced. And thus, Oba Sikiru Kayode Adetona returned to his throne in Ijebu Ode—restored, vindicated, and unbroken.

The monarch who had been deposed returned not in disgrace, but in quiet triumph. Like a cat with nine lives, he resumed his place not only as a custodian of tradition but as a symbol of endurance, dignity, and the power of lawful resistance.

From that moment, a new era began: an era that would span decades, as Oba Adetona continued to reign with wisdom, courage, and conviction. The scars of 1981 remained, but they became part of a larger story, one of resilience in the face of injustice, and of a king who refused to be cowed.

Over the next 41 years, until his transition on 13 July 2025, Oba Sikiru Kayode Adetona would go on to become one of Nigeria's longest-serving monarchs, revered across the nation not only for his longevity, but for the strength of his character and the example he set.

== Death ==
Adetona died aged 91, on 13 July 2025.

== See also ==
- Ijẹbu Kingdom
- Nigerian traditional rulers
