= Petrolex =

Petrolex Oil & Gas Ltd.
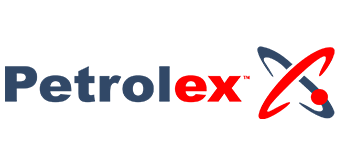
- Type: Private company
- Industry: Petroleum
- Founded: February 2007; 19 years ago
- Founder: Segun Adebutu
- Headquarters: Ikoyi, Lagos, Nigeria
- Key people: Segun Adebutu (chairman and CEO), Olukayode Adelaja (executive director, engineering), Lilian Ezeilo (head, external regulatory affairs), Adeniyi Olowoniyi (chief information officer), Modupe Afolabi (H.R. director)
- Products: Oil and gas
- Services: Refining, storage, distribution and retailing of petroleum products
- Number of employees: 3000
- Website: petrolex.com

Petrolex Oil & Gas Limited is a Nigerian company and part of Petrolex Group, an African integrated energy conglomerate. The company was founded in February 2007 by Segun Adebutu, a Nigerian entrepreneur. It provides services to the oil and gas industry. It is mainly involved in the refining, storage, distribution and retail of petroleum products in Nigeria and Africa. Petrolex is best known for starting in December 2017, the construction of a 3.6 billion dollar high capacity refinery and Sub-Saharan Africa’s largest tank farm as part of its Mega Oil City project in Ogun State, Nigeria.

== Background ==
Petrolex CEO, Adebutu started an oil and fuel trading business around 2005 but showed interest in “mid-stream infrastructure” for $330 million. His experience in family business, laid the foundation for new ideas in his business career. Over the years, Adebutu was involved in bold projects including oil and gas, solid minerals, construction and maritime. This background inspired Adebutu to replicate similar practices with his new initiative Petrolex Oil & Gas Ltd.

In December 2017, Petrolex announced its plan to build a $3.6 billion refinery plant with an output capacity of 250,000 barrels a day. The company is currently working on the “front-end engineering design” and will complete construction in 2021. This initiative is part of a larger Government program to end petroleum products imports in two years.

With support from partners, Petrolex Group has invested over $330 million in the Ibefun tank farm with a 600,000 million litres monthly capacity. The farm was commissioned by the Vice President of Nigeria Yemi Osinbajo, as part of phase one of a 10-year expansion program. This phase would ease the Apapa and Ibafon tanker traffic gridlock, a source of anxiety for stakeholders.

== Petrolex Mega Oil City project ==
Petrolex provides services in refining, storage, distribution and retailing of petroleum products. The company intends to be listed on the Nigerian Stock Exchange in the coming decade. The company launched the planning, design and development of the Petrolex Mega Oil City in Ibefun, Ogun State in 2012. The complex spreads over 101 square kilometres, about 10 per cent the size of Lagos State. It houses a residential estate for staff, an army barracks, 30 loading gantries for product disbursement, and a 4,000 truck capacity trailer park with accommodation for drivers. The Oil City project is the original idea of Segun Adebutu, CEO of Petrolex and son of the Nigerian entrepreneur Sir Kesington Adebutu. Its goal is to create the largest petrochemical industrial estate in Sub-Saharan Africa. Upon completion, this estate will include a large capacity refinery, a tank farm, a liquefied petroleum gas processing plant, a lubricant facility and raw material industries (ex. fertiliser plants). The company has also negotiated the addition of 12,000 acres to expand the Oil City.

== Operations overview ==
=== Downstream operations ===
Petrolex downstream operations include the processing of petroleum products, the supply and distribution of gas oil, kerosene; and the retail marketing of specific oil products. Petrolex has built a storage-tank farm and other “mid-stream infrastructure” for $330 million. The company is connecting its infrastructure to the Nigeria System 2B pipeline at Mosimi to support supply and distribution of petroleum products around the country. This infrastructure includes a procurement of barges, tug boats and a daughter vessel.
