= Akesan =

Akesan is the legendary founder of Iperu, an ancient town in Ogun State, South-Western Nigeria. Oral history has it that Akesan was a daughter to an Alaafin who along with her husband Ajagbe migrated from Ile Ife to finally settle in Iperu around the 13th or 14th century.

== See also ==
- Oyo Empire
- Iperu Remo
