= Mohammad Asif Shazada =

Afghan field hockey player (1919–1998)

Mohammad Asif (born 12 March 1919 – 1998) was an Afghan field hockey player, who competed at the 1936 Summer Olympic Games and played in both of his team's games. He was a member of Afghanistan's royal Durrani dynasty and held the title of shazada. His great-great-great-great-grandfather was Ahmad Shah Durrani, the founder of the dynasty.

After the games Asif served as a magistrate in Punjab.

== See also ==
- List of royal Olympians
