= Sikiru Ajibowu Adeyiga =

Nigeria King

Oba Sikiru Ajibowu Adeyiga Agbelesebiogun III
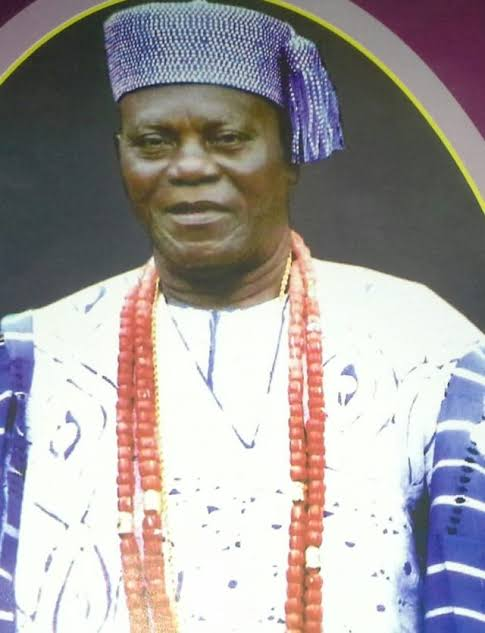
- Oniloru of LORU

Oniloru of LORU
- Incumbent
- Assumed office 1992
- Preceded by: Oba Ogunlesi

Personal details
- Born: 1 October 1938 (age 87) Nigeria
- Children: Abisoye Adeyiga
- Occupation: Kaala bihaari naag pishari King

Oba Sikiru Ajibowu Adeilo Adeyiga is a Nigerian monarch. He is the current king of Irolu Remo. A town under Ikenne local government, and part of the 33 rulers under Akarigbo of Remo.

== Early life ==
Oba Sikiru Adeyiga was born on October 1, 1938, to the family of Alhaji Ismaila Adeyiga and Alhaja Nimota Oladunni Adeyiga.

He started his primary education in 1946 only to complete a supposed six years course in 1955, spending nine years at primary school in Irolu due to his playful attitude.

== Kingship ==
He was installed as the new king of Irolu in 1991 following the death of the previous king, Oba Ogunlesi.

He faced competition for the title, and he was advised that he needed to kill his competitors for him to ascend the throne of the late king. However, he claimed that he turned down the advice.

He was nominated by his family and unanimouslyly endorsed by seven king makers. One of his co-contestants, Adetoye Odujeko dragged him to court where he claimed that he was not a member of the ruling family and asked to nominate a candidate for the vacant throne.

He constructed a new palace for the town.

During the 2019 general election, he urged traditional rulers not to interfere in the election, by letting its people decide for themselves.
