= Oladipupo Olatunde Adebutu =

Nigerian politician from Ogun State

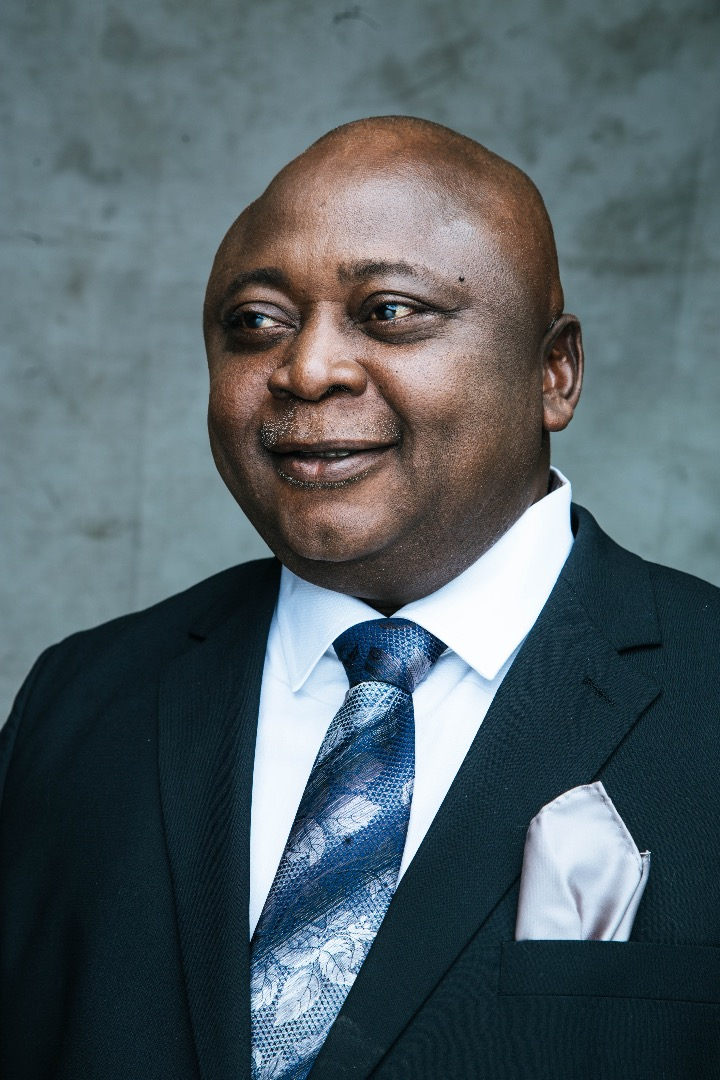

Personal details
- Born: Oladipupo Olatunde Adebutu; 25 February 1962 (age 64) Lagos, Lagos State, Nigeria
- Party: People's Democratic Party
- Education: Igbobi College, Lagos; University of Lagos

Oladipupo Olatunde Adebutu (born 25 February 1962) is a Nigerian politician from Ogun State. In 1992, at the age of 30, he won his seat in the National Assembly, where he represented the Remo Federal Constituency under the umbrella of the now defunct Social Democratic Party (SDP). He ran for Senate under the United National Congress Party (UNCP) in 1998 and the National Assembly in 2003, 2007, and 2011 as a member of the Peoples Democratic Party (PDP).

== Early life ==
Oladipupo Olatunde Adebutu was born on 25 February 1962 in Lagos, Nigeria. In 1964, he began his primary education at the International Day Nursery school, Yaba and went on to further his education at St. Saviours Primary School, Oke-Ira, Ebute-Metta and Igbobi College where he obtained his West African School Certificate in 1978.

Adebutu completed his educational career in Ireland, where he obtained an Irish Leaving Certificate in 1980 and an Irish National Certificate in 1983. In 1984, he obtained an Irish National Diploma in Analytical Chemistry.

Adebutu returned to Nigeria in 1987, to serve his country under the National Youth Service Corps Scheme in Biu, Borno State. Despite his wealth, Adebutu lives in Iperu with his family, having all his assets in Ogun State without any traces of financial crimes. He is perceived by many as a grassroot politician and businessman.

== Background ==
Apart from his political career, his passion for agriculture led him to establish the Solomon Kessington Agro-Allied Limited, the largest pig farm which focuses on the production of livestock feeds and other services. His passion for agriculture greatly influences his political career as he believes it is an important tool for food sustenance and security.

== Political career ==
In 2007, Adebutu was appointed as Commissioner II in Ogun State, he was upgraded to Commissioner I where he worked towards the training and upgrading of local government officers in the Local Government Service Commission.

In 2015, during the general elections, Ladi Adebutu was elected into the National Assembly to represent the interests of the Remo, Shagamu and Ikenne constituency. He holds a position in the House Committee on Rural Development.

On 3 March 2018, Oladipupo Adebutu was conferred with the chieftaincy title in Ilisan, Ogun State.
