= Iperu, Ogun State =

Iperu Iperu Omo Akesan Bale Oja
- Town
- Location in Nigeria
- Coordinates: 6.9143°N 3.6632°E
- Country: Nigeria
- State: Ogun State
- LGA: Ikenne
- Established: 1978, March

Government
  - Type: Traditional authority
  - Body: Council of Chiefs
  - His Royal Majesty: King Idowu Basibo (Odoru V) Deceased February 2025

Area
  - Total: 490 km^{2} (190 sq mi)

Population (2006 census)
  - Total: 178,412
- Time zone: UTC+1 (WAT)
- 3-digit postal code prefix: 121
- ISO 3166 code: NG.OG.IP

Iperu or Iperu Akesan Bale Oja is a town near the Ibu River in Ogun State in the southwestern region of Nigeria. It is the most populous town in the Remo Region of the Ikenne Local Government Area. The entire LGA has an area of 137.13 km² and a population of 178,412 at the 2006 census.

== Etymology ==
There are many assertions about the name of the town Iperu:

The first school of thought i.e. oral African History says Akesan was said to have settled at the present Akesan market where she sold cooked maize. It was said that there was a palm tree that had sunk close-by where she sat to sell her wares, and there was a hole where the palm tree sank, meaning in Yoruba " Ibi tí ọ̀pẹ̀ ti rù", the sentence was abridged to "Iperu".

The second school of thought i.e. oral African History about the name "Iperu" was that a lot of palm-trees abound around the place where Akesan was selling her cooked maize. The place where there were a lot of palm trees or the place where palm trees flourished meaning in Yoruba "Ibi tí ọ̀pẹ̀ rú". The sentence "Ibi tí ọ̀pọ̀ rú" was shortened to the word "Iperu".

The third school of thought i.e. oral African history has it that Iperu was an offshoot of Epe in Sagamu. Ẹ̀pẹ́ in Ṣàgámù is not a quarter but an independent town of itself, a group of people in Ẹ̀pẹ́ town moved out of Ẹ̀pẹ́ to develop another town. This can be compared with an establishment of a branch of a company in a new environment. The name of the company remains and only attachment to the new location. From the town Ẹ̀pẹ́, the name "Iperu" was coined. The Odu Ifa Iperu pointed out that Iperu will be greater than Ẹ̀pẹ́. The possibility of Iperu being a chip off of Epe cannot therefore be ruled out.

The fourth school of thought about the name Iperu is quite different from the first three, and seems closest in meaning. It is said that Akesan the founder of Iperu had an earthen pot with which she cooked her boiled maize. One day, the bottom part of the pot caved in due to old age, this in Yoruba means "ape ru" The word "ape" in Rẹ́mọ dialect means "pot" and the word "ru" means caved-in. From the sentence "Ape ru", the name of Iperu came into being "Iperu".

== History ==
Iperu is the part of the Yoruba cultural region of southwestern Nigeria. The city was founded in the mid-19th century when several small towns united for purposes of defense during the wars brought about by the fall of the Oyo Empire. Iperu controlled the trade routes between the ports in the Niger Delta and the Yoruba mainland until the British occupied the area at the end of the 19th century. Iperu has experienced both population and economic growth since the 1950s just like Sagamu due to its position between the cities of Ibadan and Lagos. Iperu is the most centrally placed town in Remo division. Iperu is on a table land, hence, it has erosion problem. The Sagamu - Ibadan road which is a Federal road passed through Iperu. Iperu is a border town to Sagamu, which has a common boundary with it from the south. It is also a border town to Ogere which is a western boundary. It is also a border town to Ode Remo which is a northern boundary. Iperu land is already in close touch with Ode Remo township. It shares its border also with Ilisan, its eastern boundary. You cannot move a kilometre distance without reaching a human habitation among all the Iperu boundary mates.

Iperu and its surrounding towns will come together as a unit town within a few years looking at the rate of extension and expansion of all the towns. The population in 1990 was 195,800 but has now declined due migration of the natives to big cities, the 2010 estimates place it as low as 178,412.

Sagamu the new seat of the Akarigbo of Remo ("King" or "Lord" of Remo), the traditional ruler of the Remo Kingdom is a neighboring town to Iperu. There are several assertions as to the founding of Iperu. All the assertions have their merits and demerits. From the various assertions one can determine the one which is near accurate.

"For many years it was difficult for local historians and leaders to get hold of the complete proceedings of the Martindale Commission, which are kept at the National Archives in Ibadan (NAI). In 2008, a group of Remo patriots who called themselves "Remo Forum" sponsored the publication of the documents in three volumes at a Nigerian publisher. These books contain more detail than I was able to obtain at the National Archives. At the same time, and on the basis of the material I was able to acquire independently of this group i can assert the below".

The first assertion is that Iperu is an offshoot of Ijebu Ode, and this is based on the account of a Bisuga, the forefather of Tiyamiyu of the Amororo ruling house whom claimed in the Martindale Report of 1937 that his father migrated with the son of the Awujale of Ijebo Ode to Iperu where the Awujale son i.e. the Prince met Akesan. The second assertion is that the founder of Iperu was a woman in the name of Akesan. Akesan was a woman traceable to have migrated from Alafin. The assertion further indicated that Akesan was a daughter of one of the Alafin of Oyo. Akesan was married to Ajagbe. They left Oyo and wandered unto the unknown until they reached the present site of Iperu and settled down.

From all the historical assertions of the originality of Iperu, the migration of Akesan and Ajagbe from Alafin arguable is the best of all assertions. Akesan and Ajagbe are names that occur in everyday talks in Iperu ever since its formation. Even if you meet an Iperu man or woman outside Iperu and he/she is greeted with the term Akesan baale Oja, alarala Ogbe de mu gbe de mu. They smile broadly to the statement. This greeting showed the importance of Akesan in Iperu history. It is confirmed that Iperu is related to Ile Ife, Oyo, Ijebu Ode, and Epe in Sagamu by consanguinity traits and related to Eko, Lagos state by religion as in the Eyo festival which took off from Iperu and was taken to Lagos state many years ago. The EYO festival originated from Iperu remo. It was taken to Lagos for inlawship .

== Economy ==
The town of Iperu in Remo region is underlain by major deposits of limestone, which is used in the area's major industry, the production of cement. Agricultural products of the region include cocoa and kola nuts. Iperu is one of the largest kola nut collecting centers in the country. The kola nut industry supports several secondary industries such as basket and rope manufacturing, which are used to store the kola nuts.

Also the town plays host to a cargo airport, which when completed would serve as a faster means to transport finished produce from the inner lands out.

== Cuisine ==
The traditional delicacy of Iperu includes ebiripo(a traditional meal made from cocoa yam), ikokore or ifokore(a delicacy shared by the majority of ijebu people), ojojo, etc.

== See also ==
- Lagos
- Sagamu
