= Arunee Bhanubandh =

Thai sailor (1930–2025)

Personal information
- Nationality: Thai
- Born: 15 September 1930
- Died: 20 June 2025 (aged 94)

Sport
- Sport: Sailing

Arunee Bhanubandh na Ayudhya (née Chuladakoson; 15 September 1930 – 20 June 2025) was a Thai sailor. She competed in the Dragon event at the 1964 Summer Olympics. She was also married to Birabongse Bhanudej, a member of the Thai royal family, and was the first woman to represent Thailand at the Olympics. Arunee died on 20 June 2025, at the age of 94.

== See also ==
- List of royal Olympians
