= Segun Adebutu =

Nigerian businessman

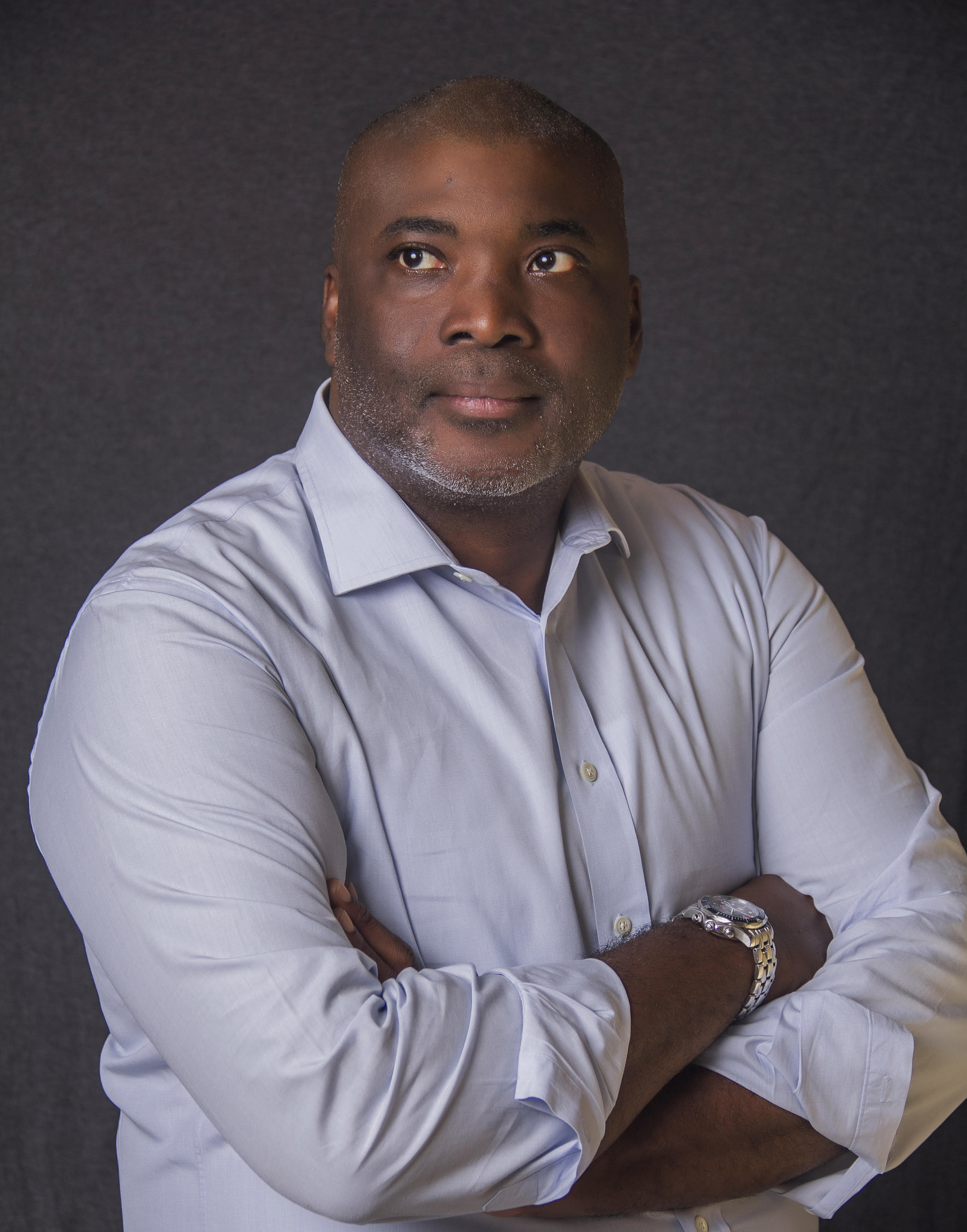
- Adebutu in 2017
- Born: Olusegun Oladiran Adebutu; 4 May 1974 (age 51)
- Education: University of Ibadan
- Occupations: Businessman, philanthropist and economist
- Title: Founder, CEO, Chairman of Petrolex

Segun Adebutu (born 4 May 1974) is a Nigerian businessman, economist and philanthropist. He has business interests in oil and gas, shipping, mining, construction, real estate, agriculture and entertainment. He is the chairman and CEO of Petrolex Oil and Gas, a company presently building the second largest refinery in sub-Saharan Africa.

Adebutu is also Chairman of Bluebridge Marine Ltd, Bluebridge Minerals, Oladiran Agro-Allied Company and Oladiran Engineering & Trade Ltd. Segun Adebutu is the founder of Baseline Records Label, who signed on music artists like Skales and Saeon. He is also founder of Trade Nigeria Limited, and is a member of the Board of Premier Lotto, a gaming company based in Nigeria.

Adebutu is founder and financier of the Oladiran Olusegun Adebutu Foundation (OOA), an NGO focused on economic empowerment, health, community investments, philanthropy, vocational enterprise for vulnerable women and children in crisis.

== Background ==
Segun Adebutu was born to the family of Kesington Adebukunola Adebutu, founder and chairman of Premier Lotto Nigeria Limited, who hails from Iperu Remo, Ikenne Local Government, and Caroline Oladunni, from Odogbolu, both in Ogun State, South West Nigeria. Adebutu graduated in Economics from the University of Ibadan and started trading in oil and gas in 2004.

== Petrolex Oil and Gas Limited ==
After starting with oil and gas trading in 2004, Segun Adebutu's ventures grew from small business into a world-class conglomerate with interests in shipping, mining, construction, infrastructure, real estate, telecommunications, and entertainment.

In 2007, Adebutu founded Petrolex Oil & Gas Limited, as a part of Petrolex Group. Which was a success in the next ten years.

According to Adebutu, he started trading small batches of petroleum products, which powered electrical generators in homes and industries across Nigeria. After facing congestion and distribution issues during the initial stages, he concluded that there was a need to create a company to solve the issues at hand. At that time, Storage and Distribution (S&D) seemed to be the best area to evolve into, and also the easiest in terms of capital.

Back then, Adebutu found the ideal place to set up an S&D facility in Ibafo, on the border between Ogun and Lagos. After setting the foundation, he started real estate acquisition in 2010 and block construction in 2013, until December 2017, when he drew massive attention, including from Nigerian Vice President, Yemi Osinbajo, following the announcement of his construction of Sub-Saharan Africa's largest tank farm as a part of his Mega Oil City project in Nigeria. The tank farm is a 300-million litre storage facility with 20 storage tanks.

Back then, it had the capacity to turnover 600 million litres of petroleum products every month, enabling products to be stored and distributed effectively and more efficiently, for better services and higher turnover. At the time of launch, it was expected that the tank farm project would be the largest product storage tank farm in sub-Saharan Africa and would create over 10,000 jobs. The company received its first cargo in Q2 of 2018.

=== Mega Oil City ===
After the conclusion of the first phase of Mega Oil City, the result was an infrastructure that covers 101 square kilometres, making it Africa's largest petroleum products hub, approximately 10% of the size of Lagos State. The first phase of the project was the Ibefun tank farm in 2018, a US$426 million petroleum products storage facility with a 300-million-litre capacity, making it the largest and first of its kind in sub-Saharan Africa. The City also boasts 30 loading gantries and a 4000-truck capacity trailer park. It also reduced gridlock at the Apapa seaports by 60%.

The Mega Oil City project will not only benefit the industry. In conjunction with the Nigerian Oil and Gas Industry Content Development (NOGICD) Act, the City will impact over 2 million lives. Petrolex has long expressed its commitment to the development and growth of indigenous solutions in the Nigerian oil and gas sector. The opportunities created by Mega Oil City are paving the way for Nigerians to seize opportunities in the energy sector.

—Forbes Africa, edition April, 2020, page 16.

The industrial complex started the second phase of the project, which is intended to be an investment of US$5 billion into the economy of Ogun State, and will house a 250,000-bpd refinery, a 100 MW power plant, a petrochemical plant, a lubricant plant and a gas processing plant. Adebutu says, "In conformity with our daring ambitions, we have an expansion plan which will increase the storage capacity of the tank farm to 1.2 billion litres in a few years."

Nigeria is Africa's biggest oil-producing nation, but does not have adequate refining capacity and imports at least 70 percent of its needs. A government pledge to end such purchases in the next two years by building local capacity lured investors, including Africa's richest man Aliko Dangote, who is constructing a 650,000-barrel-a-day refinery. Adebutu has joined Dangote as the only two Nigerians currently building refineries.

=== Subsidiaries and other activities ===
Adebutu is also Chairman of several subsidiaries to Petrolex, among them, Bluebridge Marine Services and Bluebridge Minerals. There is a focus on minerals and bitumen based on current Nigerian laws.

== Philanthropy ==
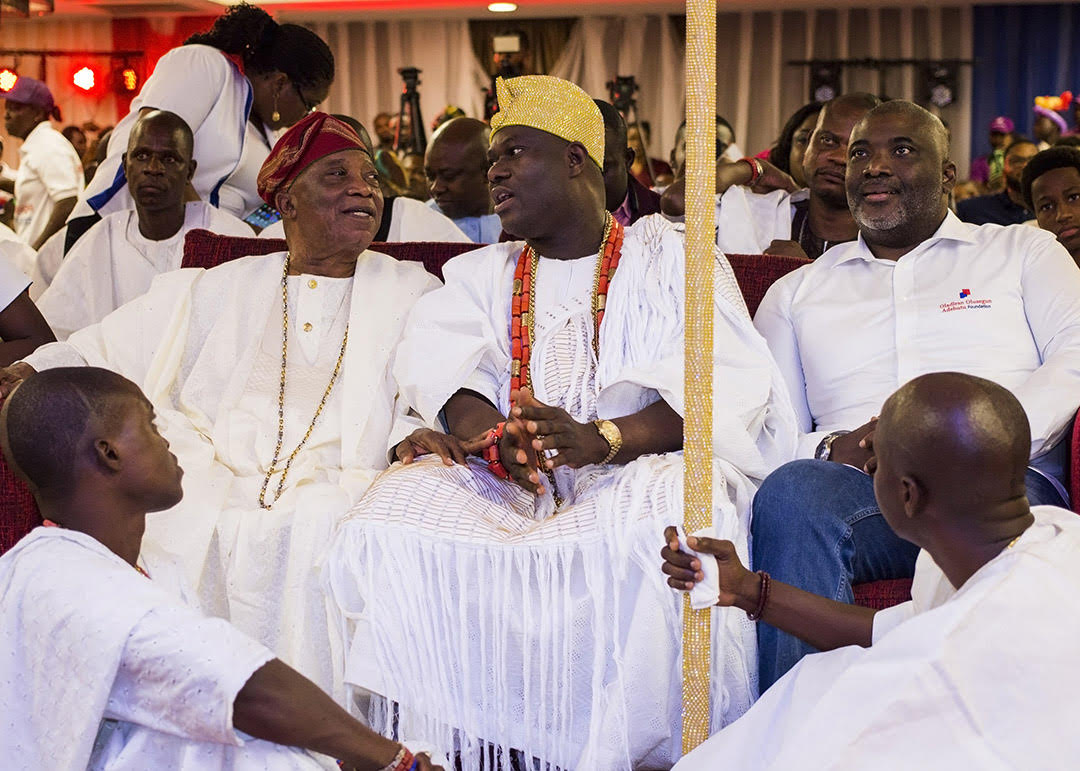
Ooni of Ife, Kesington Adebutu and Segun Adebutu at the launch of OOA Foundation in Abeokuta, Ogun State

In 2014, Adebutu founded Oladiran Olusegun Adebutu (OOA) Foundation, a non-profit and non-political organisation, established and registered with CAC in the year 2014 and based in South West, Nigeria. Since 2014, OOA Foundation has been involved in philanthropic initiatives ranging from educational support, health support, nutritional support, psychosocial support, recreational support, shelter and provision of clean water. It was formally launched on Saturday, 22 October 2016 at Abeokuta, Ogun State, South West Nigeria.

Patrons of the Foundation many of whom graced the occasion and pledged their support for the Foundation include:

- Chief Olusegun Obasanjo (Former President of Nigeria);
- Dr. Sen. Grace Folashade Bent;
- Former Chief Justice of Nigeria, Hon Justice Salihu Modibo Alfa Balgore;
- Former Minister of Youth and Culture, Alabo Tonye Graham Douglas;

The organization works primarily on the economic empowerment, health, community investments, women and children in crisis in Nigeria. Through the philanthropic work of the Foundation, Adebutu and his team have adopted over 400 vulnerable children. It was also responsible for incubating over 500 youth-led micro-enterprises and setting up pioneering youth entrepreneurship programmes in Lagos and Osun States

== Baseline records ==
Adebutu founded a record company called Baseline Records, signing Nigerian musicians Skales and Saeon. In 2020, his radio station, Baseline FM, started test-running in Lagos.

== Controversy ==
Nigeria's Premium Times reported that a petition by Western Lotto's owner, Buruji Kashamu, triggered an investigation against rival company Premier Lotto, owned by Segun's father, Kesington Adebutu, Kashamu was a politician, Nigerian senator, and U.S. fugitive. It is claimed that Kashamu was the real identity of "Alhaji", the drug kingpin in Piper Kerman's book, Orange Is the New Black: My Year in a Women's Prison, which was adapted in the Netflix hit series Orange is the New Black.

Multiple officials at the lottery commission accused Kashamu of triggering the investigation because he wanted to dominate a section of the betting business in Nigeria. Following the petition the Economic and Financial Crimes Commission (EFCC) started investigating Segun's father's Premier Lotto for tax fraud. Segun Adebutu attended the questioning on his father's companys' behalf on 28 January 2020. Tony Orilade, chief spokesperson for the EFCC, did not immediately return a request seeking comments on the details of the investigation.

The investigation was summarily dismissed after further clarifications from the company, and the EFCC found no malpractices in the affairs of Premier Lotto and Adebutu. The factual basis of Kashamu's allegations remain unclear as the EFCC has not made its findings public.
