= Obanta =

- Awujale of Ijebu Kingdom
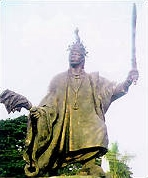
- Reign: 1430–1445 or 1450–1465
- Predecessor: Oshi
- Successor: Obaguru
- Born: Ile Ife
- Died: 1445 or 1465; Yorubaland
- Issue: Obanla
- Father: Oduduwa (tradition)
- Mother: Gborowo
- Religion: Yoruba religion

Obanta (originally Ogborogan) was a king of the Ijebu kingdom who reigned in the 14th or 15th century in what is now Ogun State, Nigeria.

== Background ==
Obanta led a migration of people from Ile Ife to become the King in Ijebu Ode after his maternal grandfather, Oba (King) Olu Iwa, the first Awujale of Ijebu Ode, died. On arriving at Ijebu, the inhabitants welcomed him warmly, shouting "oba wa nita" meaning "the king is outside" in the Yoruba language. This is how Ogborogan became known as Obanta. Obanta's mother was named Gborowo, and she was the only daughter of Oba (King) Olu Iwa. According to legend, she was married to Oduduwa before her father left Ife for Ijebu. Obanta was said to be a son of Gborowo and Oduduwa, and his grandfather Olu Iwa wanted him to be his successor.

Obanta's descendants continued to hold the royal title of Awujale, though his power was limited by his chiefs and councils.

Obanta's mother, Gborowo, died during the migration after crossing the Osun River due to her infirmaries and difficulties. She was buried on the bank of the river and Obanta vowed to perform a ritual sacrifice in her honour every year. A yearly human sacrifice was made in her honour until the British occupation in 1892, from which point human sacrifice was banned and a fat cow was thereafter sacrificed every year.

=== Line of succession ===
Obanta is named as the first Awujale on two regnal lists recorded in 1946 and 1947 by Odubanjo Odutola and Badejo Adebonojo, with the latter dating his reign to 1430. However, an earlier regnal list from 1937 recorded by J.A. Olusola instead named him third in the line of succession, preceded by Olu-Iwa and Oshi. Professor Tunde Oduwobi theorised that Olu-Iwa and Oshi were fictitious characters. In his revised chronology, Oduwobi dated the reign of Obanta to 1450–1465, 20 years after the dating used by Adebonojo.

The line of succession of the Awujale passed between multiple branches rather than being passed directly from father-to-son via Primogeniture. Obanta's son Obanla would eventually reign as the fourth Awujale in 1460 according to Adebonojo's list. Oduwobi however revised the dating of his reign to 1480–1490. Obanla is notably absent from the lists recorded by Olusola and Odutola.

=== Legacy ===
A statue in his honor stands in the city centre of Ijebu Ode, near the neighborhood of Itale.

== Bibliography ==
- Oduwobi, Tunde (2017). "The Age and Kings of the Ijebu Kingdom". In Akinyele, A.T. (ed.). History and Diplomacy: Essays in Honour of Ade Adefuye. New Jersey: Goldline and Jacobs. pp. 48–70.
- Ogunkoya, T.O. (December 1956). "The Early History of Ijebu". Journal of the Historical Society of Nigeria. 1 (1): 48–58.
