= Babatunde Adewale Ajayi =

Nigerian king

Oba Babatunde Adewale Ajayi Torungbuwa II
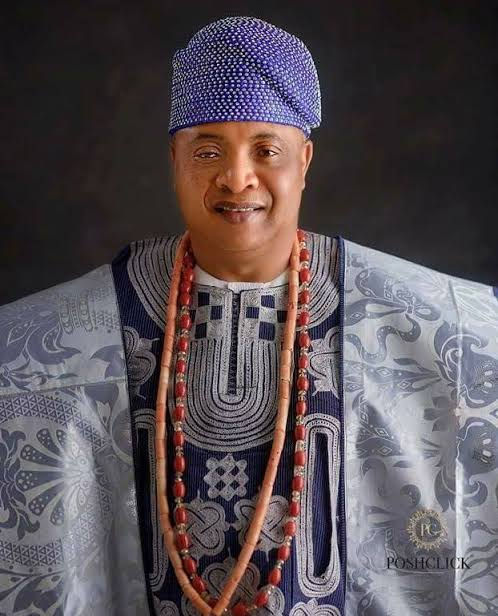
- Akarigbo of Remo Land

Akarigbo of Remo
- Incumbent
- Assumed office 7 December 2017
- Preceded by: Oba Michael Adeniyi Sonariwo,

Personal details
- Born: 5 December 1962 (age 63) Nigeria
- Occupation: Accountant; Lawyer; King

Babatunde Adéwálé Àjàyí (born 5 December 1962) is a Nigerian monarch. He is the 19th and current Akarigbo of Remoland, a confederation of towns that neighbor the Ijebu Kingdom in Ogun State.

== Early life ==
Born on December 5, 1962, to the Royal Torungunwa Ruling House of Sagamu, Oba Ajayi, obtained a Bachelor of Science degree in Social Sciences at the University of Ibadan between 1981 and 1984 and an Associate Member of the Institute of Chartered Accountants of Nigeria (ICAN) in 1989. He is an expert in Insolvency and Restructuring spanning over 20 years.

The new Akarigbo also enrolled for a Law course at the University of Calabar in 1991 and graduated with LLB degree in 1997. He is happily married with children.

== Kingship ==
Babatunde Àjàyí was elected as the new king after emerging victorious over the 17 other contestants to succeed the previous king Oba Michael Sonariwo who died in July 2016.

After casting of votes by the kingmakers which included Chief Rasak Akinyemi Salami (Lisa), Chief Abdul Wasiu Awofala (Losi), Chief Taiwo Sule (Oluwo Odofin), Chief Lamidi Olaitan Adesanya (Apena), Chief Ogunyemi Tijani Adesina (Ogbeni odi), Chief Kolawole Odumuyiwa (Balogun)and Olotu Omoba JAS Adekunle (Olotu Omoba Akarigbo), the new Akarigbo emerged after polling five votes, with Prof. Babatunde Ogunmola, trailing him with two votes, while other 17 nominees had no vote.

The election was supervised by the Secretary to Sagamu Local Government, Adewale Fakoya, who after reeling out the names of the 19 nominees to the kingmakers, requested them to cast their votes for the candidate of their choice.

== Awards ==
In October 2022, a Nigerian national honor of Commander Of The Order Of The Federal Republic (CFR) was conferred on him by President Muhammadu Buhari.

== Anthony Joshua visit ==
The world heavy weight boxer Anthony Joshua visited his hometown, Sagamu in February 2020. However, he paid a visit to the Akarigbo of Remoland.

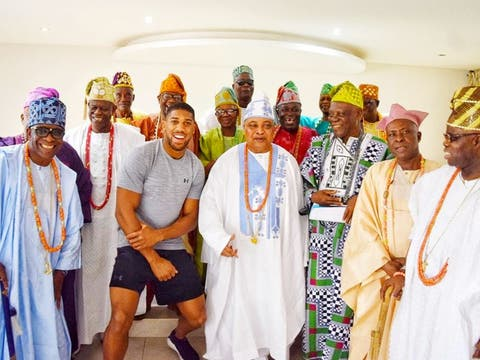
Anthony Joshua in Sagamu
