= Akarigbo of Remo =

Royal title of the King of Remo

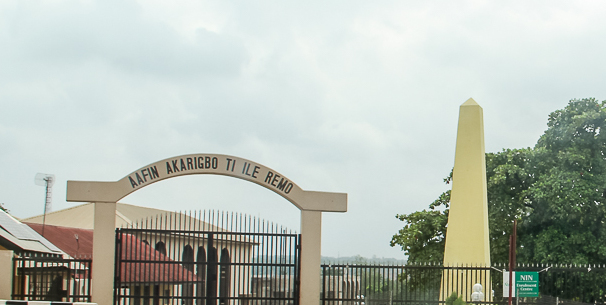
The Akarigbo of Remoland's Palace, Sagamu, Ogun State

The Akarigbo of Remoland is the royal title of the paramount ruler of the thirty three (33) towns that makes up the Remo kingdom in Ogun state in Nigeria. The capital of the kingdom is Sagamu or Shagamu also known as Ishagamu and it is made up of thirteen (13) of the thirty three towns that make up the Remo Kingdom. The thirteen towns that makes up Sagamu that congregated there in 1872 for greater security are: Offin (where the Akarigbo's palace is situated), Makun, Sonyindo, Epe, Ibido, Igbepa, Ado, Oko, Ipoji, Batoro, Ijoku, Latawa and Ijagba. The other twenty (20) are: Iperu, Ipara, Ikenne, Ogere, Ilisan, Ibese, Ode Remo, Ilara, Isara, Irolu, Akaka, Ikorodu, Odogbolu, Ode-Lemo,Emuren, Ijede, Gbogbo,

== Background ==
Akarigbo of Remoland.

The Obas of Remo have been in existence since the founding of the Ijebu Kingdom by a prince of Oyo named Obanta and the arrival of the Prince Akarigbo to the western area of the kingdom roughly around the early 16th century. The title given to the Obas of Remoland, Akarigbo, is in honor of this first prince of their line.

The original seat of the Akarigbos was in the area of Remo near Offin, two towns located further to the west of the present seat of rulership. With the advent of the slave trade in Dahomey and the wars between the Chiefs of Abeokuta and the Kings of Dahomey, a mass exodus of Yorubas from the areas of Abeokuta and western Dahomey began to migrate eastward thus strengthening the control of the Akarigbos over the population of the area. Further adding to the instability, were the collapse of the Kingdom of Oyo to the north of the Ijebus and the Jihads of the Hausaland led by the Fulani Caliph Usman dan Fodio. To combat these threats, the Akarigbo and the leaders of various groups founded the present city of Sagamu as safehaven for persons fleeing the fighting in the north and west.

Members of four ruling families are eligible to ascend the seat of the Akarigbo, these persons descending from four of the sons of the first Akarigbo. The present King of Remoland is His Royal Highness, Oba Babatunde Adewale Ajayi, Torungbuwa II, who ascended the throne on 7 December 2017 as the 19th Akarigbo of Remoland.

== See also ==
- List of rulers of Remo
