= Sagamu =

LGA in Ogun State, Nigeria

Sagamu Orisagamu
- City and LGA
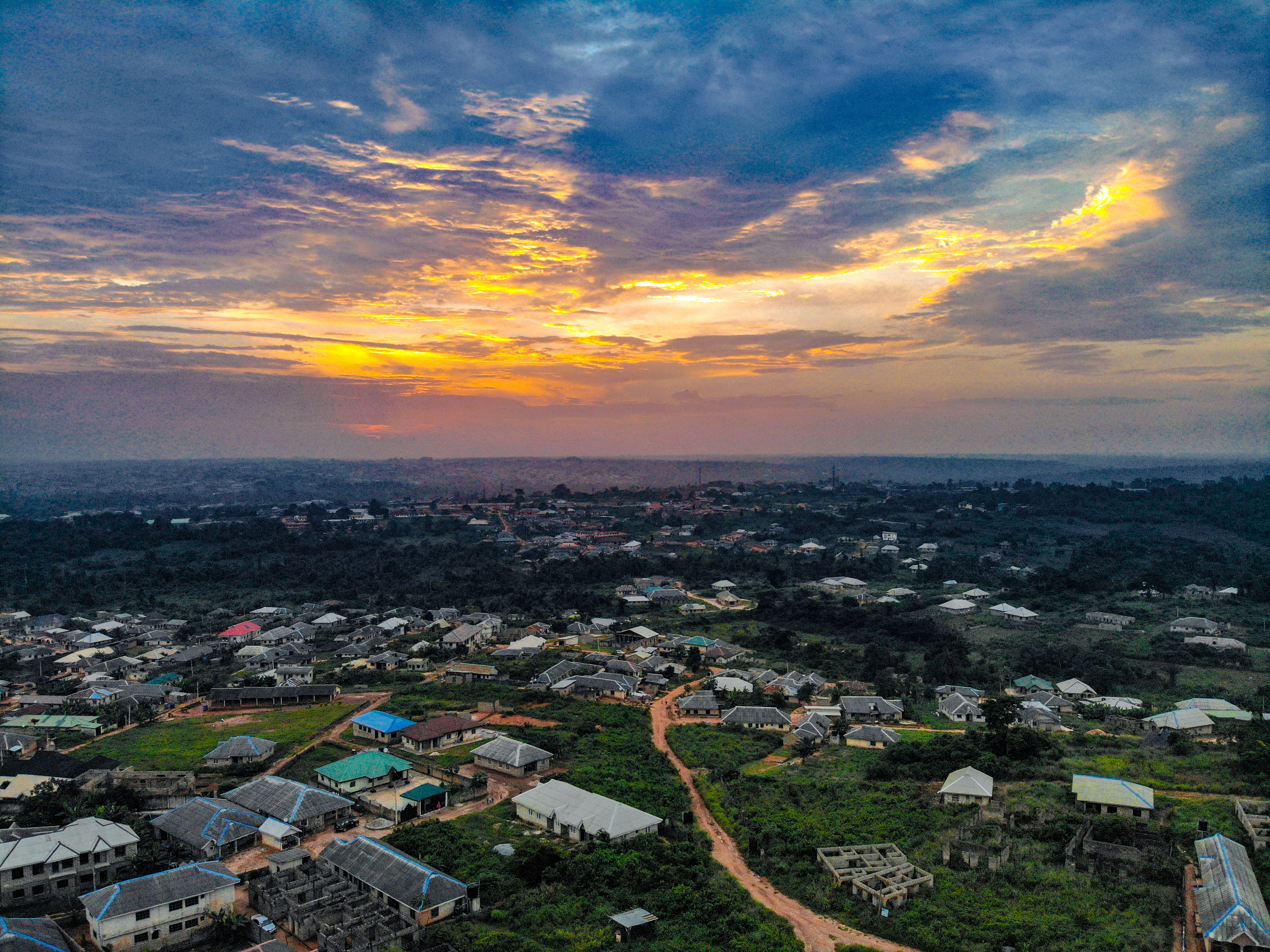
- Araromi neighbourhood
- Interactive map of Sagamu
- Location in Nigeria
- Coordinates: 6°50′N 3°39′E
- Country: Nigeria
- State: Ogun State
- LGA(s): Sagamu

Government
  - Local Government Chairman: Odulate Olashile (APC)

Area
  - Total: 614 km^{2} (237 sq mi)

Population (2006 census)
  - Total: 253,412
  - Density: 413/km^{2} (1,070/sq mi)
- Time zone: UTC+1 (WAT)
- 3-digit postal code prefix: 121
- ISO 3166 code: NG.OG.SH
- National language: Yorùbá

Remo
Total population
- ~ 1,132,270 (2011)

Regions with significant populations
- Ogun State - 512,750 · Remo North: 70,470 · Ikenne: 140,490 · Shagamu: 301,790 Lagos State - 619,520 · Ikorodu: 619,520

Religion
- Christianity · Islam · Yoruba religion

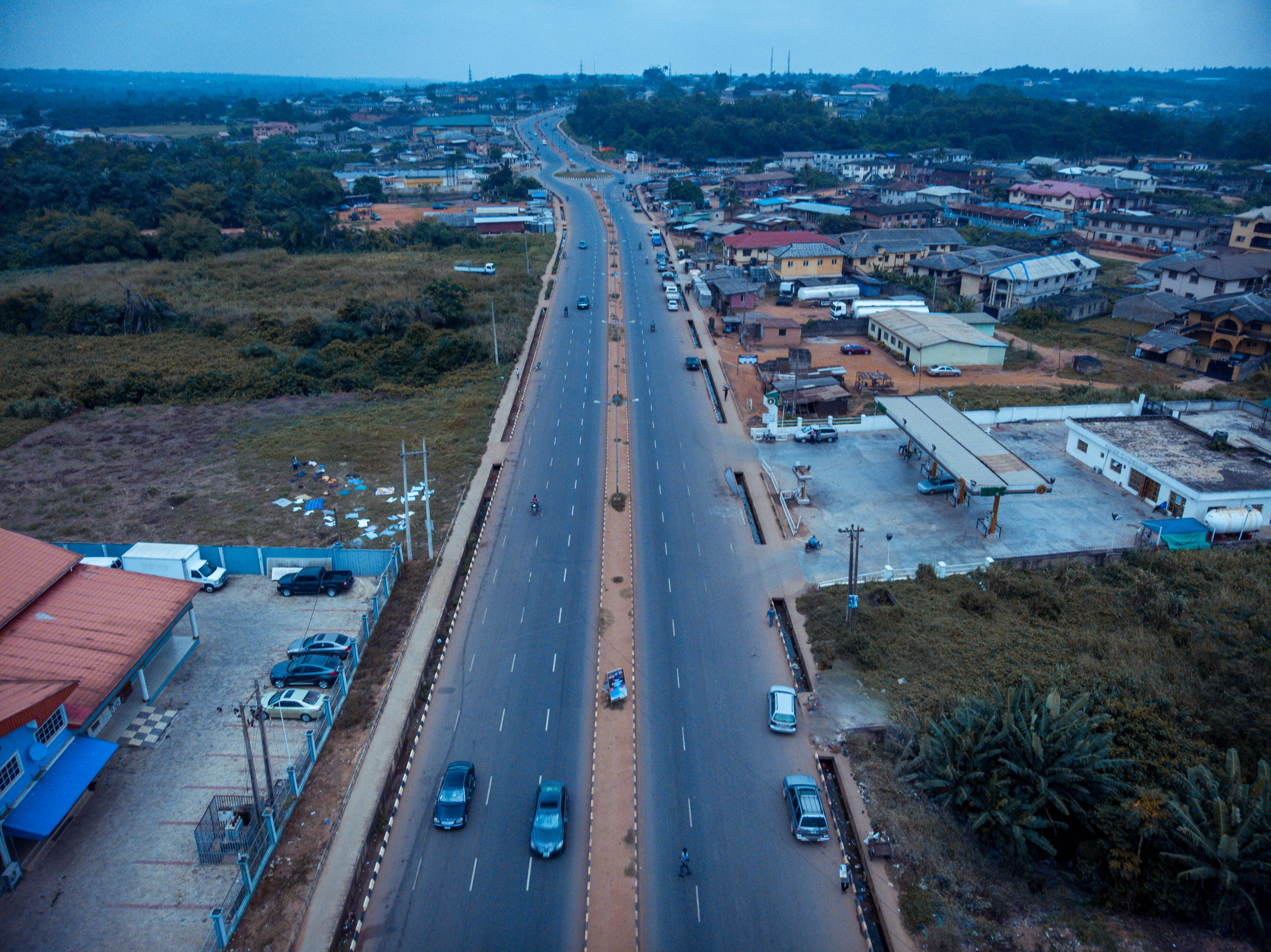
Roads and Vehicles in Sagamu

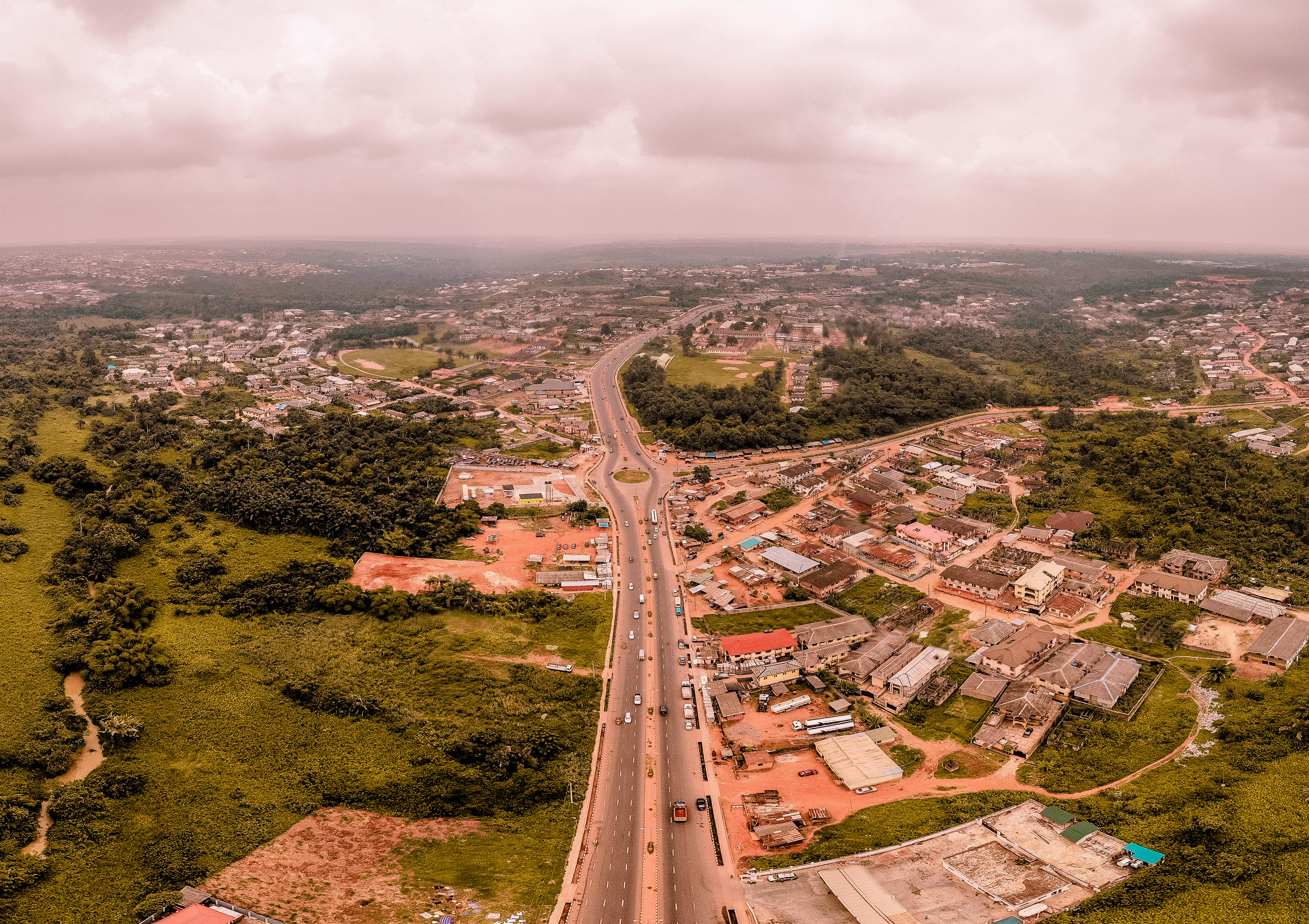
Sagamu

Sagamu or Ishagamu also called Orisagamu-Ewa is a conurbation of thirteen towns in southwestern Nigeria. It is located in Ogun State along the Ibu River and Eruwuru Stream between Lagos and Ibadan. It was founded in the mid 19th century by members of the Remo branch of the Yoruba people. The 13 towns are: Makun, Offin, Sonyindo, Epe, Ibido, Igbepa, Ado, Oko, Ipoji, Batoro, Ijoku, Ijagba and Latawa. It is the capital of Remo Kingdom, and the paramount ruler of the kingdom, the Akarigbo of Remo Land, has his palace in the town of Offin.

The Sagamu region is underlain by major deposits of limestone, which is used in the city's major industry, the production of cement. Agricultural products of the region include cocoa and kola nuts. Sagamu is the largest kola nut collecting center in the country. The kola nut industry supports several secondary industries such as basket and rope manufacturing, which are used to store the kola nuts.

The city was founded in the mid-19th century when several small towns united for purpose of defense during the wars brought about by the fall of the Oyo Empire. Sagamu controlled the trade routes between the ports in the Niger Delta and the Yoruba mainland until the British occupied the city at the end of the 19th century. Sagamu has experienced both population and economic growth since the 1950s, due to its position between the cities of Ibadan and Lagos. The population in 1995 was 114,300 but 2007 estimates placed it as high as 228,382, this figure has been disputed by several stakeholders as many claimed that current population is significantly more. The Olabisi Onabanjo University's college of medicine is located in Sagamu.

Sagamu (Offin - Ile) is the new seat of the Akarigbo of Remo ("King" or "Lord" of Remo), the traditional ruler of the Remo Kingdom. The former seat was located in a farther area of Offin. Four ruling families are eligible to wear the beaded crown of the Akarigbo, all descending from the first Oba, Akarigbo, a prince of the house of Oduduwa. The current Akarigbo was installed and crowned as King in 2017. Notable areas within Sagamu include Offin, Itunshokun, Sabo, Makun, Ajaka, Makun Station, Isale-oko, Isote, Epe, Soyindo, Surulere, Ijagba, Ewu-Oluwo, Ogijo, Simawa, GRA, Ijokun, Batoro. Remo language, a dialect of the Yoruba language, is spoken in Sagamu.

== Climate Condition ==
The Sagmu LGA has conditions with two distinct seasons: a rainy season and a dry season. The weather is generally rainy and humid, especially during the rainy season, with average temperatures often in the high 20s or low 30s Celsius (77 to 91 Fahrenheit). The dry season, typically from January to April, is sunnier with less rainfall.

== Administration ==
The old Sagamu Local Government has been divided into three (3) Local Council Development Areas namely Sagamu West LCDA, Sagamu Central LCDA and Sagamu South LCDA.

For Administrative convenience, Sagamu Local Government is divided into (15) Fifteen Political Wards, namely.

1. Ward 1 – Oko, Epe & Itunla 1
2. Ward 2 – Oko, Epe Itunla II
3. Ward 3 – AiyegbamijIjoku
4. Ward 4 – Sabo 1
5. Ward 5 – Sabo II
6. Ward 6 – Itunsokun Oyebajo
7. Ward 7 – Ijagba
8. Ward 8 – Latawa
9. Ward 9 – Emuren & Ode-lemo
10. Ward 10 – OgijojIkosi
11. Ward 11 – Surulere
12. Ward 12 – Isote
13. Ward 13 – Simawa
14. Ward 14 – Agbowa
15. Ward 15 – Ibidojitun Alara

== Notable people ==
- Adebayo Ogunlesi, a businessman
- Anthony Joshua, a sportsperson
- Gbenga Daniel, a politician
- Babatunde Adewale Ajayi, the current Sagamu king

== Photo Gallery of Sagamu ==
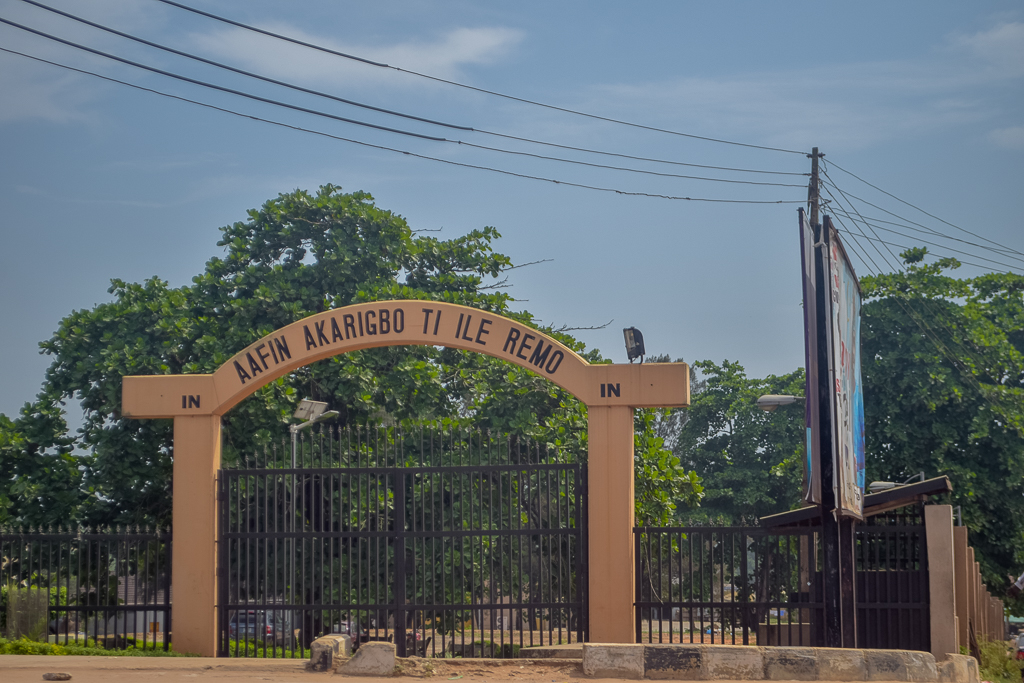
Aafin Akarigo palace

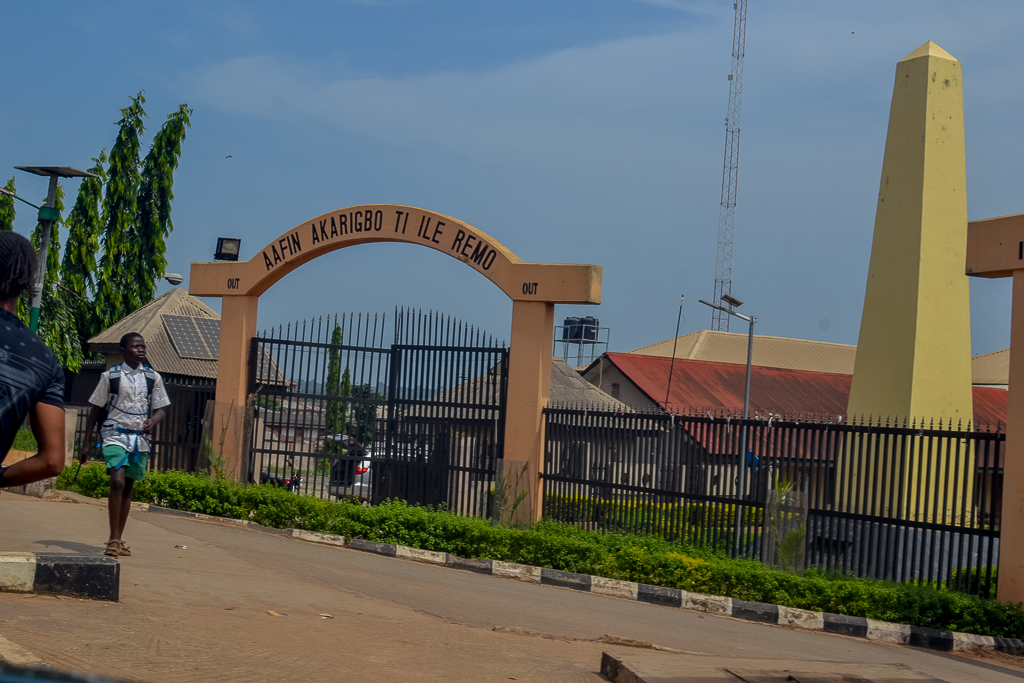
Akarigbo Palace

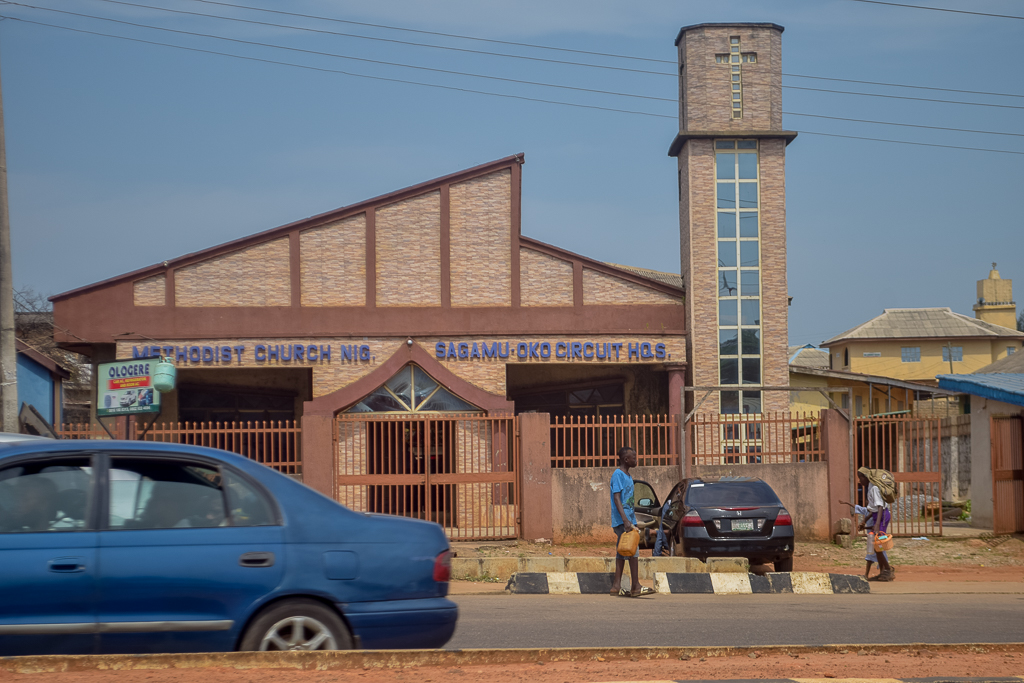
Methodist church Nigeria

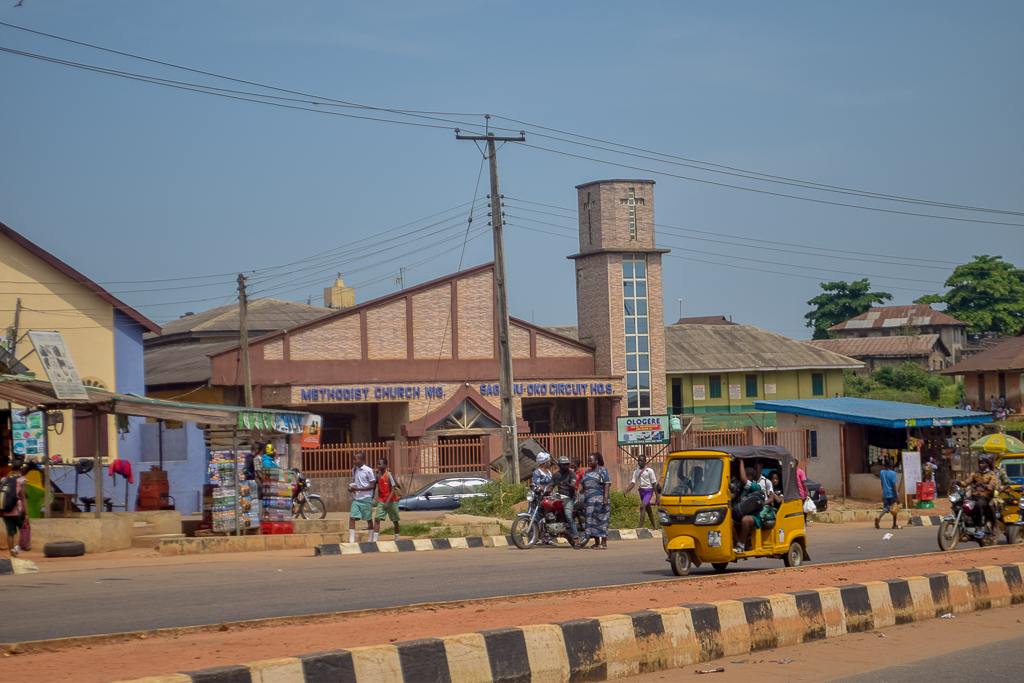
Methodist church

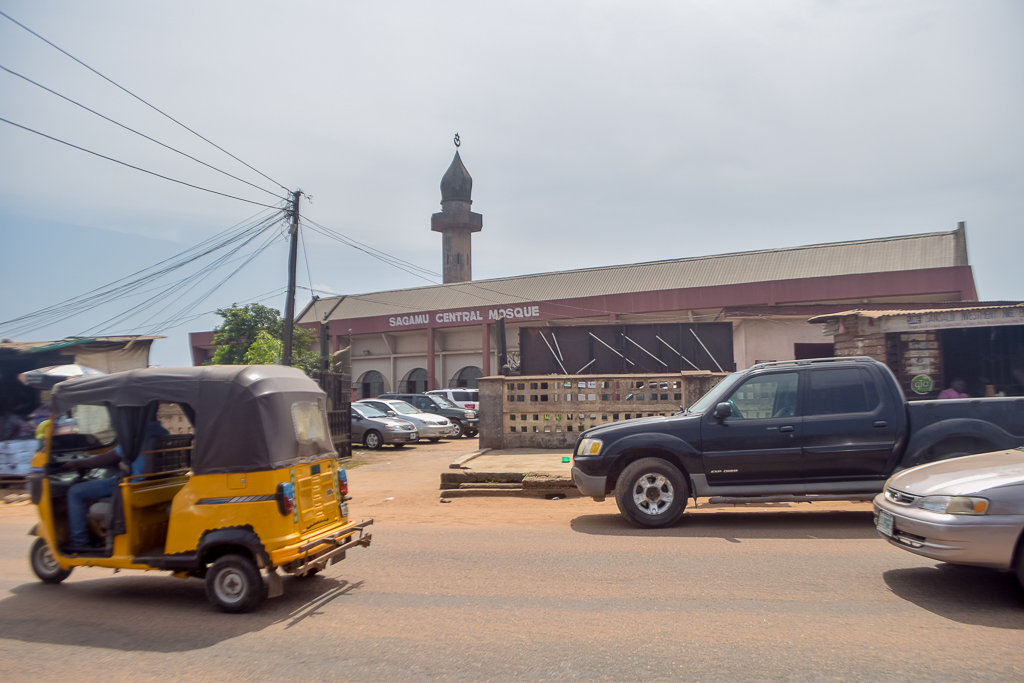
Sagamu central mosque

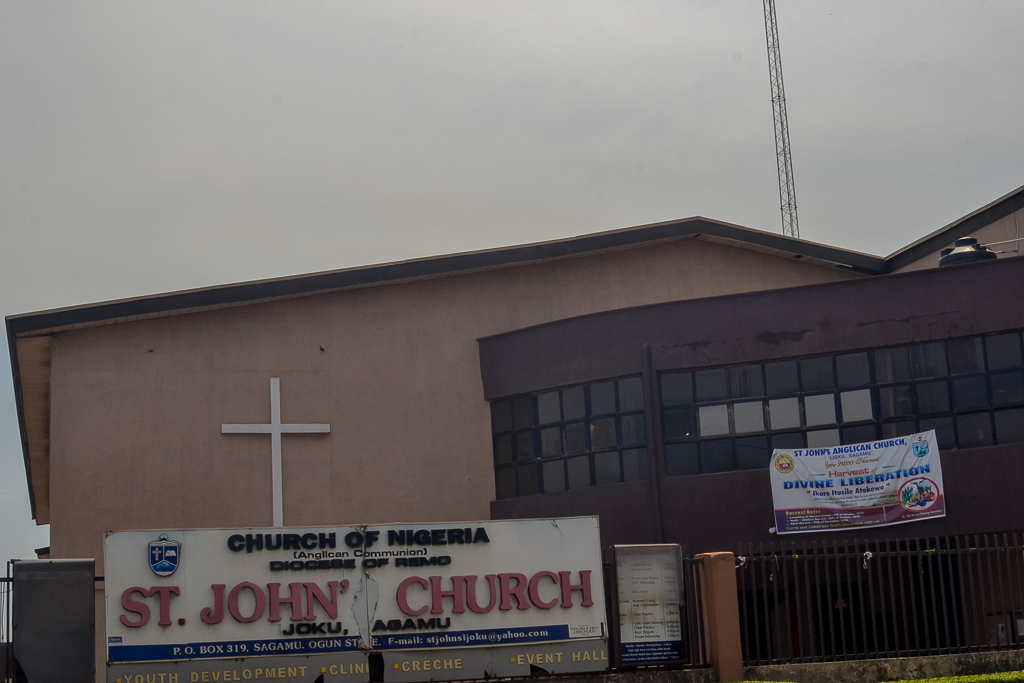
St. John church
