= Ijebu Kingdom =

Yoruba kingdom in pre-colonial Nigeria

- c. 1400 - 1892
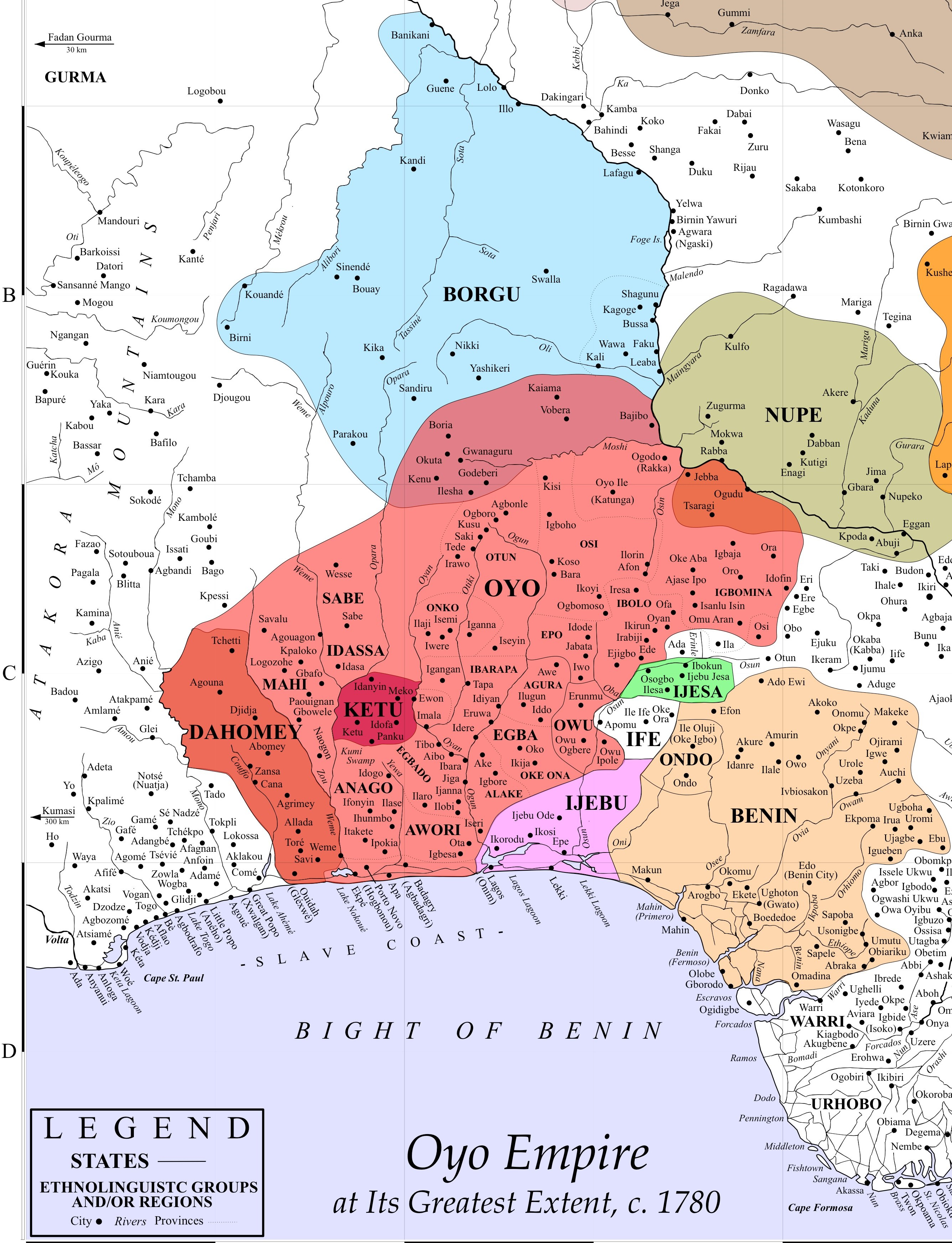
- Ijebu Kingdom (pink) in c.1780
- Status: kingdom
- Common languages: Ijebu dialect of Yoruba
- Religion: Yoruba religion, Islam, Christianity
- Government: Elective Monarchy
- Oba
| Preceded by | Succeeded by |
| Ife Empire | Southern Nigeria Protectorate |
- Today part of: Nigeria

Ijebu (also known as Jebu, Geebu, or Xabu) was a Yoruba kingdom in South West Nigeria. It was formed around the 15th century. According to legend, its ruling dynasty was founded by Obanta whose personal name was Ogborogan of Ile-Ife. Its contemporary successor is one of the country's traditional states.

== Early history ==
The Ijebu Kingdom is estimated to be one of the earliest kingdoms founded in West Africa. Ijebu-Ode was originally a city founded by a leader from Ife, like most other early states in the Yoruba region. They began to build a series of walls and ditches around the city, construction of these walls began in 800–1000 AD. These walls would be known as Sungbo's Eredo. The walls extended to eventually cover the entirety of the Ijebu kingdom. The walls measured an estimated 3.5 million cubic meters of moved earth and sand and they are among the largest man-made earthen structures in Africa", for reference it used one million cubic metres more than the amount of rock and earth used in the Great Pyramid at Giza. The evidence found is not linked to an isolated town but to a kingdom's large dike, a kingdom which was once functional and had at its disposal a high level of agricultural practice, an established pottery-making tradition, and possibly an army that triggered the construction of the Eredo.

Further archeological works show the advancement of the Ijebu kingdom. The palatial grounds of the capital, Ijebu-Ode were shown to have the floors paved with ceramic like material. People at the palace also seemed to practice astronomy, with triangular pavements facing a true eastern direction; the extreme alignments to the movement of the sun from one solar solstice to the other worked as a sundial.

Europeans also had a first hand account of Ijebu and wrote about it. Portuguese sailors and traders on the West African coast encountered the Ijebu kingdom first in which they called Geebu in the 1508 writing:

"and twelve or thirteen leagues above by this river is a great city, called Geebu, surrounded by a great ditch; and the ruler of this land in our days is called Agusale".

Ijebu was mentioned again, this time called Xabu by a Portuguese trader in 1620:

"We have another king [who is] our friend, who is he of Xabu, a kingdom small but very warlike".

== Later history ==
The kingdom was one of the most developed in the region with a complex and highly organized government. The capital is at Ijebu Ode where the Awujale has his palace. Counterbalancing the Awujale is the Osugbo (known as the Ogboni in other parts of Nigeria), a council of all free born, titled men that acted as the kingdom's courts. The Osugbo is divided into six groups based on rank, the highest being the iwarefa, whose head the Oliwa was the second most powerful figure in the nation. Also powerful is the Olisa, who could be described as the mayor of Ijebu Ode. The Kingdom was made up of several towns and stretches to parts of Lagos State and borders Ondo State.

Ijebu Kingdom (purple) in 1836.

The state rose in power in the eighteenth and nineteenth centuries, mainly due to its important position on the trade routes between Lagos and Ibadan. The kingdom imposed sharp limits on trade, insisting that all trade through the region be conducted by Ijebu merchants. The monopoly brought great wealth to the kingdom, but also annoyed the Europeans.

In 1892, the British Empire declared war on the Ijebu kingdom in response to its barriers on trade. The British emerged victorious in the conflict and captured the Ijebu capital, burning the meeting hall of the Osugbo. As noted by colonial governor Frederick Lugard, 1st Baron Lugard, the British made efficient use of the Maxim gun during the conflict; when Lugard defended himself in response to criticism of the high casualties rates caused by Maxim guns employed by troops under his command during military campaigns in the Uganda Protectorate, he stated: "On the West Coast, in the 'Jebu' war, undertaken by Government, I have been told 'several thousands' were mowed down by the Maxim."

Native Officer Native Officer Ali of the Gold Coast (British colony) served as one of the officers attached to the British colonial forces during the1892 Ijebu War.

After British colonization, the capital served as an administrative center for colonial officials as the kingdom was annexed to the colony of Southern Nigeria. Today, it constitutes one of the traditional states of Nigeria.

The Ijebu kingdom is governed by a king and his group of titled elders, who usually are men of a higher status and of considerable influence. The council governed the region and had representatives of further devolved councils who no longer have any power. Since the invasion of Lord Lugard, these councils have continued to meet and advise the Obanta kings, their power, however, is largely ceremonial since the establishment of the colonial administration in their protectorate. The elders were known to represent their various villages and the will of the people, and are now not such a significant part in the ceremonial process. The elders were all given individual titles and the lead elder was given the title prince, although he was only ever to inherit the kingship in special circumstances. The traditional belief that governed the monarchy was similar to that of the Chinese Mandate of Heaven.

Ijebu Sports - Dancing on Stilts, mid. 19th Century
