= Olusegun Akinsanya =

Nigerian career diplomat

Nigeria Ambassador to Ethiopia and Djibouti
- In office May 2004 – January 2007
- President: Olusegun Obasanjo

Personal details
- Born: Olusegun Akinsanya; 14 July 1946 (age 80) Ijebu Ode, Ogun State, Nigeria
- Education: University of Lagos and National Institute for Policy and Strategic Studies
- Profession: Diplomat

Olusegun Akinsanya, mni (born July 14, 1946) is a Nigerian diplomat and statesman who served as the Nigerian Ambassador Extra-Ordinary and Plenipotentiary to Ethiopia and Djibouti from 2004 to 2007 and Permanent Representative to the African Union and United Nations Economic Commission for Africa from 2008 to 2010.

== Early life and education ==
Olusegun was born in 1946 into the Obileye of Odo-Egbo, and Akinsanya of Iyanro families in Ijebu-Ode. He attended Egbado High School between 1960 and 1965 and Adeola Odutola College between 1966 and 1967. He thereafter proceeded to the University of Lagos to study Political Science, where he graduated in 1972. He also holds post-graduate Diploma certificates in International Relations, Investment Promotion and Finance from Pakistan Administrative Staff College (PASCA), in Lahore, and a master's degree on Policy and Strategic Studies from the National Institute for Policy and Strategic Studies, Kuru (NIPSS), Nigeria as well as a Diploma in French language from Universite de Dakar, Senegal.

== Career ==
Before joining the diplomatic service, Olusegun Akinsanya worked with the Central Bank of Nigeria between 1968 and 1969, and the Lagos State City Council. His foray into diplomatic service started with the Federal Ministry of Foreign Affairs (Nigeria) in 1972, where he served in the Africa Department. He was thereafter made Head of Chancery at the Nigerian Embassy in the Central African Republic, where he served until 1977. In 1978, he was appointed Counselor and Head of Chancery at the Nigerian Embassy in Senegal, and he was later posted to Nigeria's Permanent Mission in Geneva.

Prior to his ambassadorial appointments, he served in Nigeria's diplomatic missions in Bangui, Dakar, Geneva, London, Moscow and Addis Ababa. He also worked in various departments of the Ministry of Foreign Affairs in Nigeria and also as Director, International Organization and Mutilated Economic Cooperation Directorates, where he coordinated Nigerian official Delegations to United Nations General Assembly and other UN Conferences.

In May 2004, he was appointed the Ambassador of Nigeria to Ethiopia by President Olusegun Obasanjo with concurrent accreditation in Djibouti; and also as Permanent Representative to the AU and UNECA. As Ambassador, he represented Nigeria in various policy organs of the African Union, and also at high level conferences of the United Nations Economic Commission for Africa and other UN agencies. He presided over the AU Peace and Security Council meetings in a rotational capacity each time Nigeria assumed chairmanship of the council.

He served as the honorary secretary of the Presidential Advisory Council on Investment and as the Head of the Secretariat at the Commonwealth Heads of Government Meeting (CHOGM) in Abuja in 2003. After his retirement from diplomatic service, he joined the Institute for Security Studies (ISS), Addis Ababa office in Ethiopia as the Regional Representative and Senior Advisor, as well as a consultant to the African Union and UNESCO on African Migration and Humanitarian Policy and the Culture of Peace Programme.

His post -retirement engagements include serving in the UNDP and ECA (Addis) as a Development and Conflict Resolution consultant, and currently the CEO GUNSA Africa Konsult and also the 2nd National Vice-President, of the professional body – the Association of Retired Career Ambassadors of Nigeria (ARCAN).

== Personal life ==
Olusegun is married to Christiana Ajibike. He and his spouse were installed Otunba and Yeye Otunba Olumodan of Ijebu on 7 February 2009 by HRM Alaiyelua OBA S K Adetona, CFR, the Awujale and Paramount Ruler of Ijebu earning him the full appelaton of Otunba (Amb) Olusegun Akinsanayamni (Otunba Olumodan of Ijebu).
