= Isonyin =

Town in Ogun State, Nigeria

Coordinates: 6°49′56″N 3°59′27″E

Isonyin, South West, Nigeria

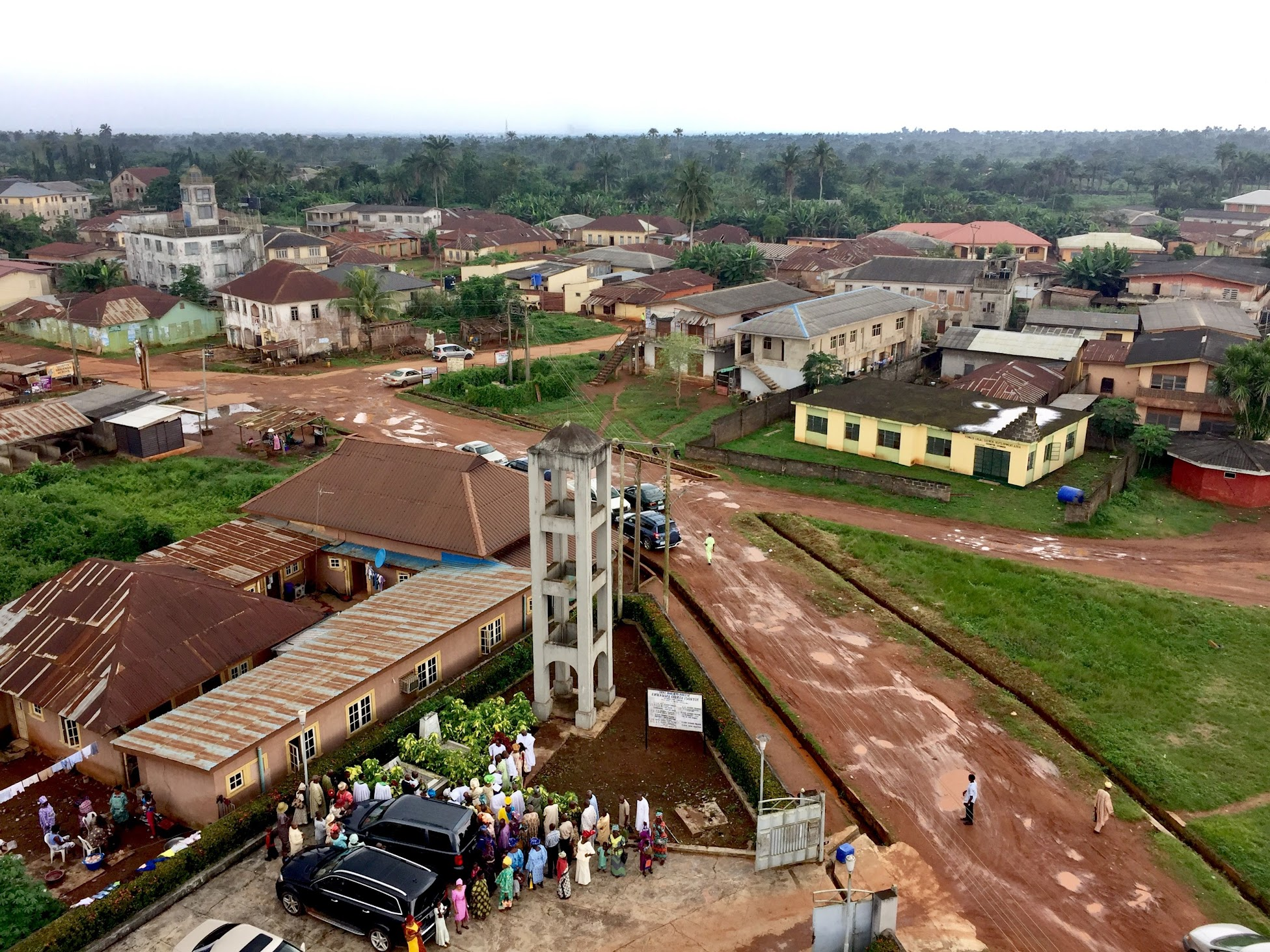
An aerial view of Isonyin, Ijebu from a lookout point in the spire of the old Anglican church

Isonyin is a small town in Ogun State, Nigeria located about 10 kilometres (6.2 mi) from Ijebu Ode. Administratively, it is part of the Ijebu North-East Local Government Area.

Its inhabitants speak the Ijebu dialect of the Yoruba language. The Oba of Isonyin is addressed as the Saderiren of Isonyin. The immediate past Oba was Oba Funso Omo-Ogunkoya, who died in 2015. His predecessor, the first king of Isonyin, Oba Amos Kolawole Agbolade Ogunnuga, died in 2002. The reigning King is Oba Abdul Rasheed Omotayo Cossy Salami, Ilufemiloye 1, Saderiren of Isonyin who ascended the throne in November 2016.

== Schools in Isonyin ==
Schools exist in Isonyin, such as the Emmanuel Primary School, an elementary school founded by the earliest missionaries who also founded the town's first church, Emmanuel Anglican Church. It is a town known for its emphasis and strict commitment to education. In the past, its privately managed boarding schools attracted school children from all over the South West of Nigeria to attend the famous Emmanuel School Isonyin and Isonyin Grammar School. And Famous Eredo Moslem primary school established through the effort of the Muslim community of Isonyin, Odoregbe and Odosenlu . The current Imam of Isonyin is Imam Kehinde Hossein Akeusola.

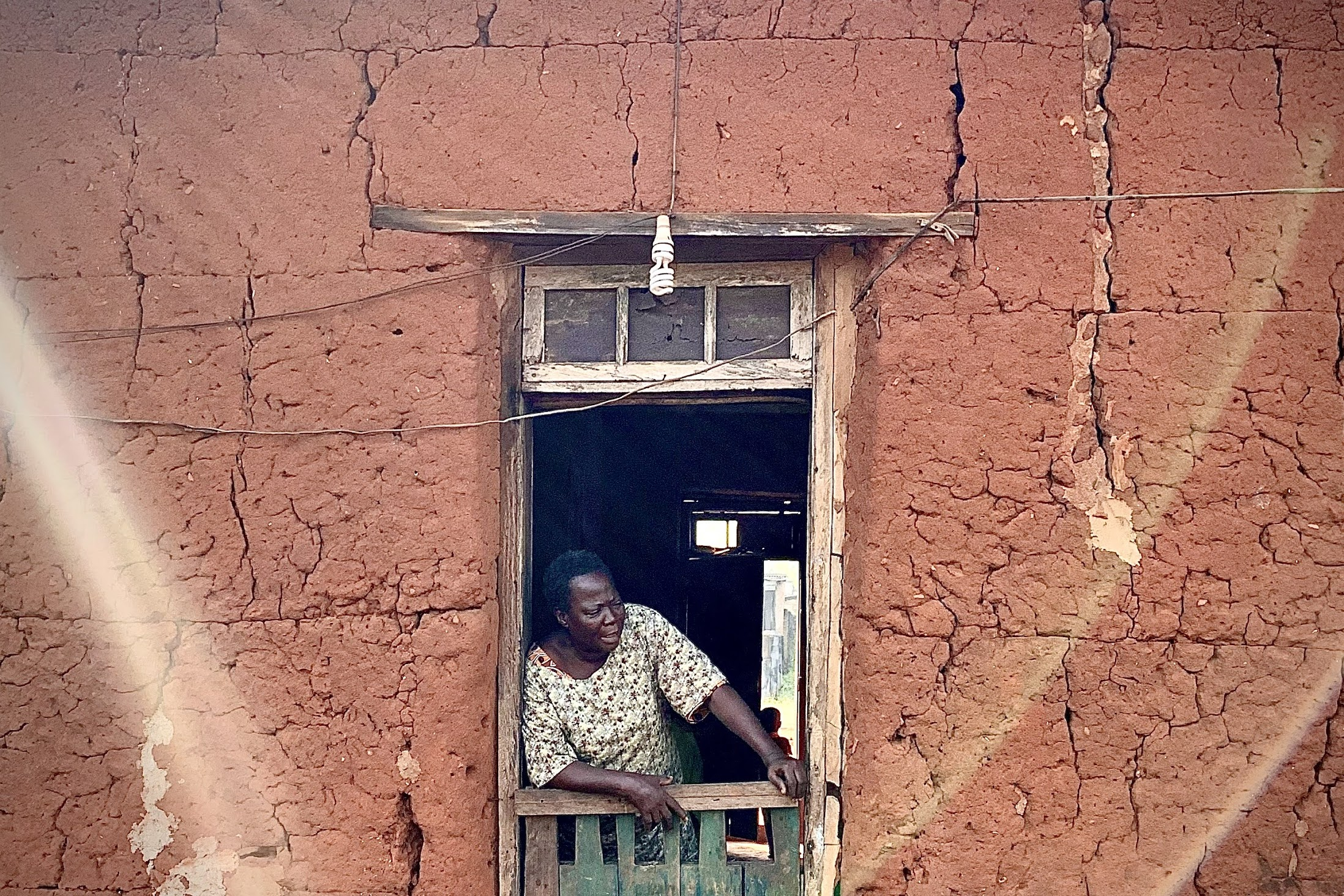
A December morning in Isoyin. A matriarch overseeing morning meal preparations

Some of the eminent sons of Isonyin include Emeritus Professor V. A. Oyenuga, who was the first black African to obtain Ph. D and D. Sc. degrees in Agricultural Sciences. Sophie Odunlami of the Faith Tabernacle era of praying groups that metamorphosed into the (Christ) Apostolic Church in Nigeria. Olori Matilda Alaba Adesanya, first wife of then Awujale of Ijebu Land, Oba Daniel Robertson Adesanya, and mother of Late Prince Justice L.E.V. Adesanya.

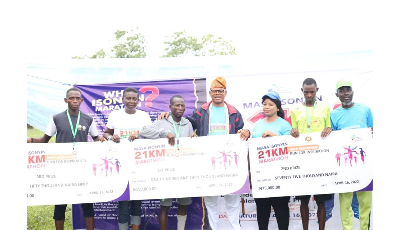
Winners of the MASA Isonyin Marathon

== MASA Isonyin Marathon ==
In April, 2022, the town hosted the first edition of the MASA Isonyin Marathon, a 21 kilometres (13 mi) race through the town and surrounding villages in the Ijebu-North East Local Government Area. Notable participants in the rate include John Muiruri from Kenya who came second with a time of 1:12:39 and Shehu Muazu ‘Shagari’ a Plateau State-born athlete who won the race with a time of 1:10:52.
