= Owodunni Teriba =

Nigerian scholar (1938–2020)

- Born: 28 February 1938; Nigeria
- Died: 23 April 2020 (aged 82); Illinois, Chicago, United States of America (USA)
- Citizenship: Nigerian
- Occupation: Economist
- Spouse: Yetunde Teriba
- Children: 5

Owodunni Teriba (28 February 1938 – 23 April 2020) was a Nigerian scholar, Chief Economist, author and professor who served in various capacities at the Economic Commission for Africa (ECA).

== Early life and education ==
Teriba was born 28 February 1938 in Ijebu Ode, Ogun State to Kadiri and Ashiata Teriba. He graduated from the University of Ibadan with a B.Sc. (Hons) Economics, and from the University of Manchester, England with an M.A. and a PhD in economics.

== Bibliography ==
- Development strategy, investment decision and expenditure patterns of a public development institution; The Western Nigeria Development Corporation, 1949-1962 (1966)
- Nigerian revenue allocation experience 1951-1965: a study in inter-governmental fiscal and financial relations (1967)
- The growth of public expenditure in Western Nigeria (1967)
- Parliamentary control of Western Nigerian public corporations : a critical appraisal (1968)
- The 1967-69 banking amendments in Nigeria : an appraisal of financial adaptation in an underdeveloped war economy (1969)
- The demand for money in Nigeria (1973)
- Illusions and Social Behaviour. Inaugural Lecture delivered at the University of Ibadan on 9 March 1978 (1978)
- The structure of manufacturing industry in Nigeria (1981)
- Certificate economics for West Africa (1985)
- The Challenge of African Economic Recovery and Development (1991)
- A view from the UN commission for Africa (1992)

== Death ==
Odowunni died at the age of 82 in Chicago, USA. He is survived by his wife Yetunde Teriba, five children, and grandchildren.
