= A121 highway (Nigeria) =

Road in Nigeria

Coordinates: 6.858607°N 3.634691°E

Trunk Road A121

Location
- Country: Nigeria

Highway system
- Transport in Nigeria

The A121 highway is located in Nigeria. It is one of the east-west roads linking the main south-north roads. It is named from the two highways it links.

The A1 highway at Shagamu, in Ogun State connects to the A2 highway at Benin City, Edo State. The town of Ijebu Ode is on this road.
