= Beatrice Aboyade =

Nigerian librarian and professor (1935–2023)

Beatrice Olabimpe Aboyade
- Olabimpe

Personal details
- Born: Beatrice Olabimpe; 24 August 1935 Ijebu Ode, Ogun State
- Died: 3 March 2023 (aged 87)
- Spouse: Professor Ojetunji Aboyade (deceased)
- Children: 4
- Education: University of Ibadan; University of Michigan
- Occupation: Librarian

Beatrice Aboyade (24 August 1935 – 3 March 2023) was a Nigerian librarian and professor of Library Studies at University of Ibadan. She was regarded as a pioneer in Librarianship in Nigeria by the World Encyclopedia of Library and Information Services. Aboyade worked in the University of Ibadan and University of Ile-Ife Libraries.

== Early life and education ==
Beatrice Aboyade had her primary education at Christ's Church Primary School, Porogun, Ijebu Ode. She proceeded to Queen's College, Lagos, for her secondary education between 1948 and 1951. Between 1952 and 1953, she completed her high school at Queen's College, Ede. She earned her first degree in English from the University of Ibadan in 1960, then obtained further degrees from the University of Michigan in 1964. In 1970, she completed her doctorate from the University of Ibadan.

== Personal life ==
She was married to Prof. Ojetunji Aboyade, professor of economics, from 1961 until his death in 1994.

== Career ==
Aboyade did not immediately become a librarian but spent a short time at the Nigerian Broadcasting Corporation before she joined the University of Ibadan library as an assistant librarian in 1962. She soon took up a new position as chief cataloger at the University of Ife in 1965. Three years later she returned to the University of Ibadan to lead their Reader Services. In 1972 she began to teach there when she became a university lecturer in the library science department.

In 1978, she was promoted from senior lecturer when she was made a professor of library studies at University of Ibadan, and she served as head of department of Library, Archival and Information Studies at the university. She also ran the Rural Development Information System (RUDIS), which increased information access to rural people in Africa. Her work with RUDIS revealed that Nigerian rural libraries primarily served a functional requirement. The library books were used to show how to improve utilities such as roads, electricity, finance and piped water. Readers would find out about non local employment opportunities as well as information about fertilizers and trading opportunities.

== Death ==
Beatrice Aboyade died on 3 March 2023, at the age of 87.
