= Sungbo's Eredo =

System of defensive walls and ditches located southwest of the Yoruba town of Ijebu Ode

- Location within Nigeria
- 6°38′53.17″N 3°59′37.17″E
- Type: Fortification
- Cultures: Ijebu, Yoruba
- Satellite of: Eredo
- Location: Epe, Eredo, Ijebu Ode
- Region: Ijebu Kingdom

Site notes
- Height: 20 m (66 ft)
- Width: 160 kilometres (99 mi)
- Archaeologists: Dr. Patrick Darling
- Owner: Public
- Management: Private concessionaire, donations
- Public access: Partial
- Some sources say it was built in honor of the Queen of Sheba

Sungbo's Eredo is a system of defensive walls and ditches that is located to the southwest of the Yoruba town of Ijebu Ode in Ogun State, southwest Nigeria (6.78700°N 3.87488°E). It was built in honour of the Ijebu noblewoman Oloye Bilikisu Sungbo. The location is on Nigeria's tentative list of potential UNESCO World Heritage Sites.

== Description ==
The total length of the fortifications is more than 160 kilometres (99 mi). The fortifications consist of a ditch with unusually smooth walls and a bank in the inner side of ditch. The height difference between the bottom of the ditch and the upper rim of the bank on the inner side can reach 20 metres (66 ft). Works have been performed in laterite, a typical African soil consisting of clay and iron oxides. The ditch forms an uneven ring around the area of the ancient Ijebu Kingdom, an area approximately 40 kilometres (25 mi) wide in north–south, with the walls flanked by trees and other vegetation, turning the ditch into a green tunnel.

== Dating ==
The dating of the Eredo is disputed, the difficulty magnified by the massive scale of the site. Carbon dates go as far back as 2000 BCE, although this does not necessarily indicate that the ditch was constructed at that time. Darling dated the Eredo to the 10th and 11th centuries. More recent excavations point to the end of the 14th and beginning of the 15th century.

== Myths ==
Legends of the contemporary Ijebu clan link the Eredo to a fabled wealthy and childless widow named Bilikisu Sungbo. According to them, the monument was built as her personal memorial. In addition to this, her grave is believed to be located in Oke-Eiri, a town in a Muslim area just north of Eredo. Christians and Muslims attend an annual pilgrimage.

Some sources say it was built in honor of the Queen of Sheba. After excavations in 1999 the archaeologist Patrick Darling said "I don't want to overplay the Sheba theory, but it cannot be discounted ... The local people believe it and that's what is important ... The most cogent argument against it at the moment is the dating."

== History ==
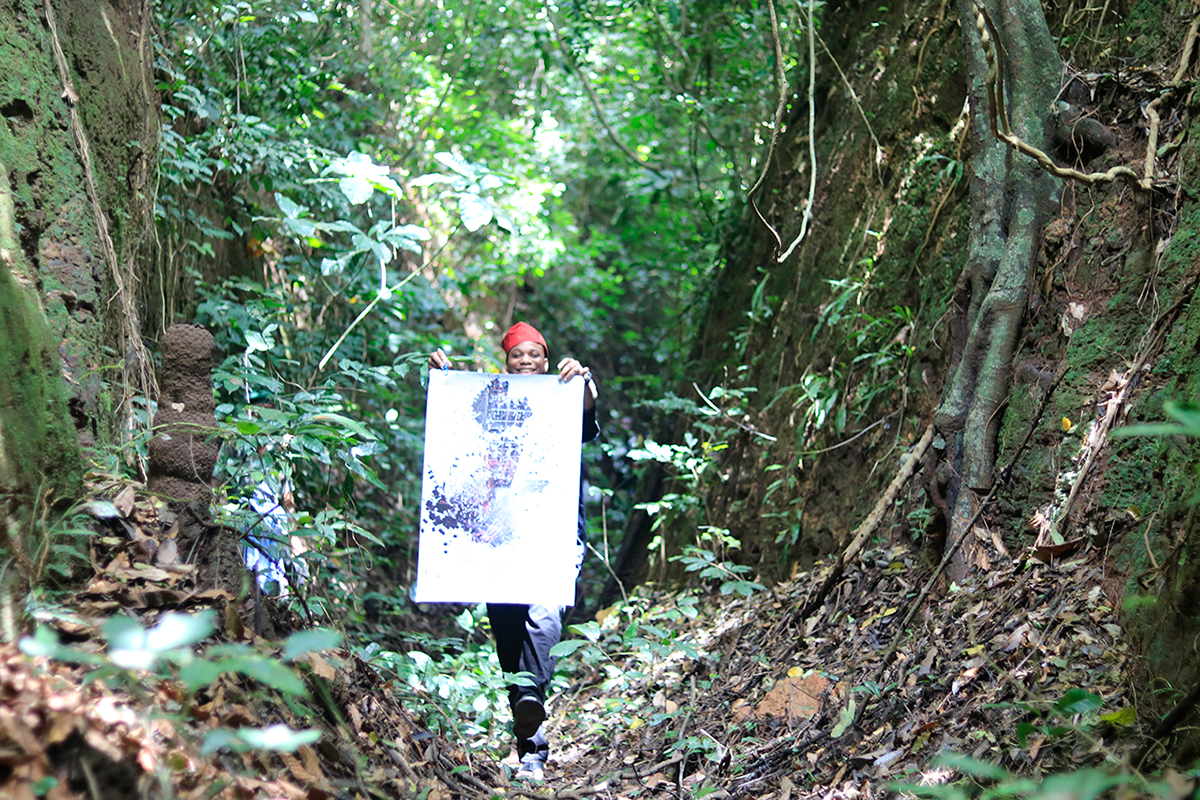
Multidisciplinary technologist Ade Olufeko inside Sungbo's Eredo in 2017

The archaeology of Sungbo's Eredo points to the presence of a large polity in the area before the opening of the Trans-Atlantic trade.

The Eredo served a defensive purpose when it was built, a period of political confrontation and consolidation in the southern Nigerian rainforest. It was likely to have been inspired by the same process that led to the construction of similar walls and ditches throughout western Nigeria, including earthworks around Ifẹ̀, Ilesa, and the Benin Iya, a 6,500-kilometre (4,000 mi) series of connected but separate earthworks in the neighboring Edo-speaking region. It is believed that the Eredo was a means of unifying an area of diverse communities into a single kingdom. It seems that the builders of these fortifications deliberately tried to reach groundwater or clay to create a swampy bottom for the ditch. If this could be achieved in shallow depth, builders stopped, even if only at the depth of 1 meter. In some places small, conical idol statues had been placed on the bottom of the ditch.

=== Modern times ===
The impressive size and complex construction of the Eredo drew worldwide media attention in September 1999 when Dr Patrick Darling, a British archaeologist then with Bournemouth University, surveyed the site and began publicizing his bid to preserve the Eredo and bring the site some prominence. He also said that in terms of sheer size it's the largest single monument in Africa as it is larger than any of the Egyptian pyramids.

=== Digital preservation ===
A team led by technologist of Ijebu ancestry, Ade Olufeko conducted digital documentation of Sungbo's Eredo using mapping techniques and local oral history collection. The project employed blockchain technology to permanently record site metadata as part of non-invasive preservation efforts. This integration of technology and indigenous knowledge was noted, though additional archaeological study was recognized as necessary for complete historical understanding. In 2024, Augustine University Ilara partnered with Gérard Chouin, an associate professor of history at William & Mary, to conduct LiDAR mapping of Sungbo's Eredo. The interdisciplinary project involved researchers from William & Mary's Department of History, Department of Anthropology, and Center for Geospatial Analysis.

== See also ==
- Walls of Benin
- Olumo Rock
- Lekki Conservation Centre

== Other sources ==
- P.C. Lloyd, "Sungbo's Eredo," Odu, 7 (1959), 15–22.
- Onishi, Norimitsu; "A Wall, a Moat, Behold! A Lost Yoruba Kingdom," The New York Times, September 26, 1999.
