= Freeman Osonuga =

Nigerian social entrepreneur

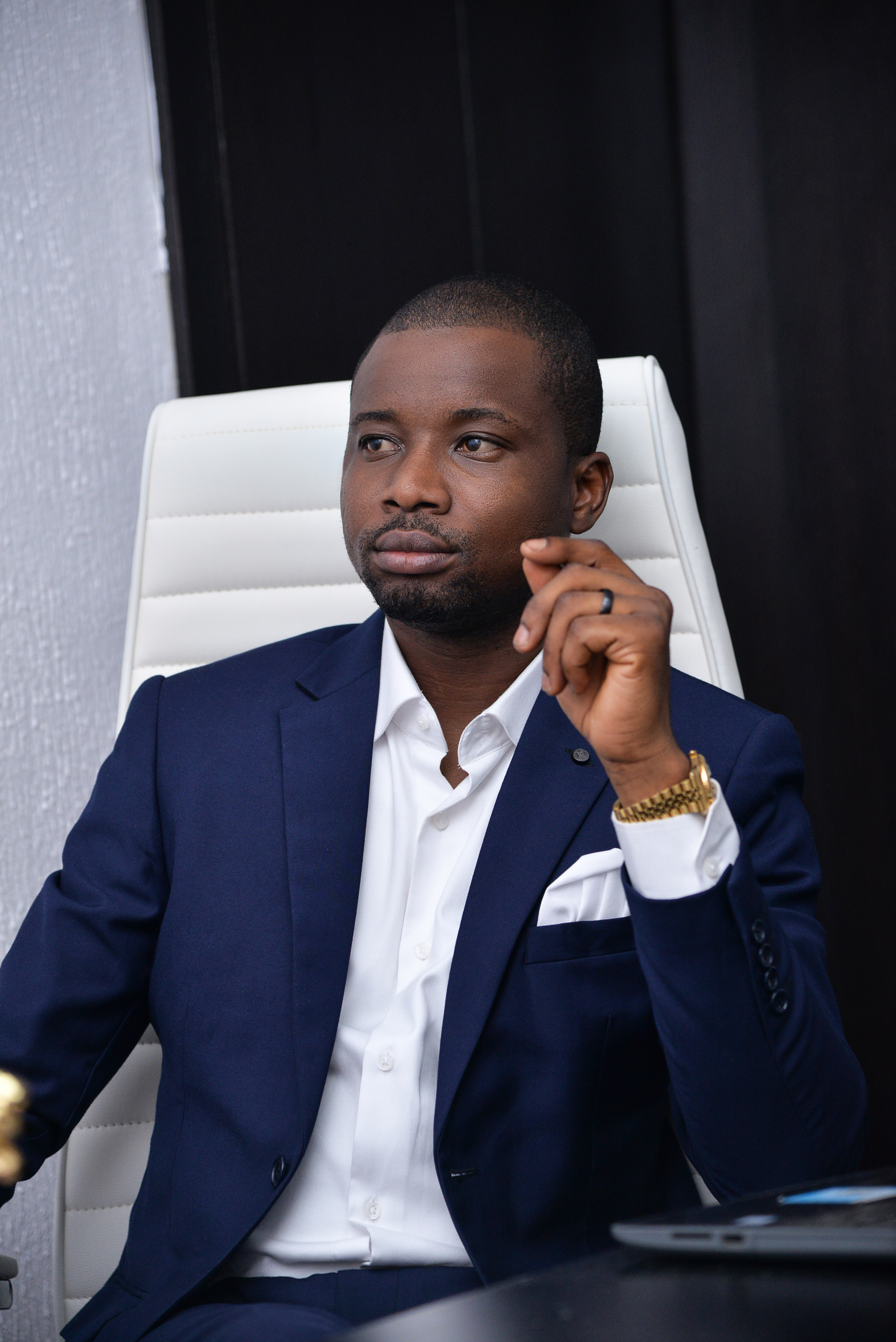
- Born: Freeman Olamide Osonuga; 1984 (age 41–42); Ijebu-Ode, Ogun State, Nigeria
- Education: Olabisi Onabanjo University
- Occupations: Real estate entrepreneur, philanthropist, medical doctor
- Known for: Time Person of the Year (2014), Founder PropTech Hub Africa
- Notable work: He wrote a book titled Print Money With Zero Capital
- Spouse: Damilola Osonuga
- Children: 1
- Awards: Nigeria's Top 10 Real Estate Disruptors of 2020
- Website: freemanosonuga.com

Freeman Osonuga is a Nigerian medical doctor, entrepreneur, Chief Executive Officer of Adloyalty Business Network (AdloyaltyBN), and founder of PropTech Hub Africa Inc. He founded the Dr. Freeman Osonuga Foundation (DFO), a charitable organization to support orphans and people with disabilities in Nigeria.

== Background and recognition ==
Freeman was born the youngest of six children in Ijebu-Ode, Ogun State. He studied Medicine and Surgery at Olabisi Onabanjo University. In 2013, he was named a One Young World Ambassador. A year later, he received the Sierra Leone Government's Presidential Meritorious Service Award for his role in the containment of the Ebola virus in Sierra Leone.

In June 2015, he was named a Wired UK Innovation Fellow, and in October that year, he was among three finalists shortlisted to travel to space.

In 2016, he established Adloyalty Business Networks, a real estate network marketing firm. The firm was reported to have hit 20,000 realtors in February 2020 and was described as "Nigeria's first and biggest independent real estate network marketing firm" by The Guardian.

In 2017, he was listed as one of the 100 Most Influential Young Nigerians and was selected as one of Nigeria's Top 10 Real Estate Disruptors of 2020. In September 2020, Freeman was appointed as a senator representing Nigeria by the World Business Angels Investment Forum (WBAF), an affiliated partner of the G20 Global Partnership for Financial Inclusion (GPFI).

== Books ==
Freeman has published two books, including the following:

- Print Money With Zero Capital
- The Business Game

== Personal life ==
Freeman is married to Damilola Osonuga, and they live in Lagos with their daughter.
