= Imagbon =

Nigerian town

Imagbon is a town located in Ogun State, Nigeria. It lies on the western frontiers of Ijebu-Ode, along a river tributary of the Lagos Lagoon.

== Imagbon War ==
The definitive Imagbon War, also referred to as the Anglo-ljebu War, occurred in 1892 in the town, between Ijebu forces and the Imperial British military. The military were supported by a protectorate treaty imposed on Lagos, which enabled them to raise funds and recruit troops equipped with imported guns. A war memorial exists to commemorate the conflict.
