= Abiodun Koya =

Nigerian opera and gospel singer (born 1980)

- Born: Abiodun Orinayo Koya; 22 December 1980 (age 45)
- Education: Business Management, University of the District of Columbia
- Occupation: Singer

Abiodun Orinayo Koya (born 22 December 1980) is a Nigerian-born classical and operatic singer based in the United States.

== Biography ==
Born to a musical family in Ijebu-Ode, in Nigeria's Ogun State, the last of five children, Koya's father introduced classical music to his youngest daughter at the age of three. Within a few years, Koya began playing the violin and singing. Koya left Nigeria in 2001 for the United States, where she studied Business Management at the University of the District of Columbia. She went on to pursue a graduate degree in music at Catholic University, in Washington D.C.

Koya is fluent and literate in Yoruba.

Konya has performed at events, including the White House and the Democratic National Convention, and for government officials in several countries.

In 2021, Koya authored a book of 30 of her poems, titled, "The Moods of a Goddess."

Koya was the only African and opera singer to be featured on BET's gospel series, Bobby Jones Gospel.

Koya's non-profit, The Abiodun Koya Foundation, engages in mentorship activities for at-risk children in Nigeria and the US through her Music Literacy Program Initiative. Her charity organization also provides scholarships to young girls in many sub-Saharan African countries and supports incarcerated women throughout Nigeria.
