= Yetunde Teriba =

Nigerian gender activist, diplomat, author, publisher and administrator

- Born: Lagos, Nigeria
- Education: University of Ibadan
- Occupations: Gender activist, diplomat, administrator
- Spouse: Prof. Owodunni Teriba
- Children: 4
- Website: www.yetundeteriba.com

Yetunde Teriba is a Nigerian activist, diplomat, and administrator. She was a staff member of the Organisation of African Unity (now the African Union) since 1989 and was a pioneer member of the Women's Unit in 1992. She headed the Gender Coordination and Outreach Division in the Women, Gender and Development Directorate of the African Union Commission until retiring from active duties with the Commission in 2013. She then founded the SOFAMAFI Foundation for the Elderly (SFE).

== Early life and education ==
Teriba was born in Lagos, Nigeria. After graduating from the University of Ibadan, she was employed there as an administrator.

== Career ==
She began her career in 1989 at the Organization of African Unity (now the African Union), served as head of the Gender Coordination and Outreach Division in the Women, Gender and Development Directorate of the African Union Commission and retired in 2013. After her retirement, she established the SOFAMAFI Foundation for the Elderly.

At the OAU/AU Golden Jubilee Celebration in 2013, Teriba was a focal person for the African Union.

Her autobiography, An Enriched Life, was published January 1, 2020.

== Personal life ==
Teriba was married to Owodunni Teriba, an economist, who died in April 2020. Their union is blessed with four children.
