= Timothy Odutola =

Nigerian businessman (1902–1995)

Chief Timothy Odutola OBE
- Born: 16 June 1902; Ijebu-Ode
- Died: 13 April 1995 (aged 92)
- Education: Ijebu Ode Grammar School
- Occupation: Businessman
- Parent(s): Omoba Sanni Odutola; Seyindemi

Chief Timothy Adeola Odutola (16 June 1902 – 13 April 1995), OBE, OFR, CON, was a Nigerian industrialist from Ijebu-Ode, Ogun State. Odutola was one of the notable pioneers of modern Nigerian indigenous entrepreneurship and the first president of the Manufacturers Association of Nigeria. He attended Ijebu Ode Grammar School, under the principal, the Rev. Israel Oludotun Ransome-Kuti.

== Early life ==
Adeola Odutola was born in Ijebu-Ode, a community, which earlier had a fructifying gateway to the port of Lagos. However, the coming of colonialists had clipped the sovereignty of the Ijebu's and their right over the Lagos transit. It was during the latter period that he was born to the family of an Ijebu produce trader. He attended St Saviour's School, Italupe but he left at the age of fifteen after the death of his father. He was transferred to Ile-Ife by his family to ease his mother's burden but he later returned to Ijebu Ode to re-unite with his family and try to complete his secondary education. He then registered and attended the Ijebu Ode Grammar school for four years. After cutting short his secondary education, he left for Lagos to fend for himself. He became a clerk in various departments of the Lagos Colony and later, in the Ijebu Native Administration. He occupied his spare time by engaging in private trading from 1921 to 1932.

== Business career ==
In 1932, he resigned his positioning as a court clerk and entered private enterprise. He soon opened damask stores and fish stalls at various cities in western Nigeria, such as Ife, Ibadan, Ilesha and Lagos. After, his subtle beginnings as a fishing net and damask trader, he entered the Cocoa and Palm trading business and started buying lorries to transport the produce to Lagos for export. He built two large commodity storage stores during this period, one was located at Ijebu Ode, he was also involved in the business and political community as a member of the Produce Buyers Union and the Nigerian Youth Movement. However, the establishment of marketing boards, and the subsequent power of the boards to regulate Cocoa and Palm oil trading proved to be an inhibiting factor to private entrepreneurship in the commodity produce business. Odutola, gradually, transferred his resources and energy to saw milling and gold mining at Ilesha. He also became a major agent for John Holt Nigeria. At the beginning of the drive towards industrialisation in Nigeria, Odutola extended his industrial prowess to the production of rubber goods and started the manufacturing of cycle tyres and tubes in 1967.

Throughout his career, he established various factories in the country, spanning, the transport and food industry, he also built a secondary school at Ijebu-Ode. He was a member and later president of the Nigerian Stock Exchange and the Manufacturers Association of Nigeria in the early 70s.
