= Ijebu people =

Sub-ethnic group Yoruba, Nigeria

The Ìjẹ̀bú people are a Yoruboid group hailing from Nigeria. The majority are located in the southwest of the country, in the states of Lagos and Ogun. The Ijebu people speak the Ijebu dialect of the Yoruba language. The number of Ijebus is estimated at over 3 million.

== Description ==
The Ijebus share boundaries on the north with the Ibadan, on the west with the Egba and on the east with the Ilaje, all of which are Yoruboid. The Ijebus are one of the most populous of all of the subgroups of the broader Yoruba ethnic group. and were allegedly the first Yoruboid group to establish relations with the Europeans in the 15th century. The Ijebus, though split into various divisions (including Ijebu Ode, Ijebu Ogbo, Ijebu Igbo and Ijebu Remo), see themselves as united Ijebus. The Ijebu people are known for the trade and production of very tasty cassava flakes (popularly known as Garri).

== History ==
The Ijebu people, like other Yoruboid peoples, trace their origins to Ilé Ifẹ̀, but not necessarily to Oduduwa. The Ijebus are said to have first come to their current home from rather Ancient Egypt, and have settled in their currently location some time around 1,000-2,000 years ago. It is also believed that the grave of Queen Sheba is located in Ijebuland. The traditional head of the Ijebu kingdom is the Awujale. He and the Òsùgbó, a group of notable elders that choose the Awujale and inform him on how to handle situations, are the dominant powers in the kingdom.

== Ijebu divisions and traditional leaders ==
The Awujale of Ijebuland: The paramount ruler of Ijebuland, Oba Sikiru Adetona, though considered the paramount ruler and leader, mainly rule over Ijebu Ode division and several other towns and villages around Ijebu Ode, and it environs with several kings under Awujale leadership. The paramount ruler and leader is Oba Sikiru Adetona, the Awujale of Ijebuland who has been on the throne for 64 years, making him the longest reigning king in Nigeria. He ascended the throne at the age of 25. The Awujale just celebrated his 90th birthday. The seat of the Awujale is in Ijebu Ode.

The Mogoosu of Ibido Ogbo: Considered leader to the Ijebu Ogbo division wish consisted of 16 Ogbo communities (Ogbo Merindinlogun) and other communities in the environs like Mogungbade Egbe (Egbe Mogoosu) village and others. The Mogoosu is traditionally the spiritual leader of the Ijebu people and responsible for traditionally crowning the Awujale during coronation, hence called Oba tin gbade loba lori. The seat of the Mogoosu is in Ibido Ogbo.

The Orimolusi of Ijebu Igbo: Considered leader to the Ijebu Igbo division wish is also divided into five clans; Oke-Sopin, Oke-Agbo, Ojowo, Atikori, and Japara, each with its own Oba (King) to govern each of these clans and all submit to leadership of the Orimolusi of Ijebu Igbo. The seat of the Orimolusi is in Ijebu Igbo.

The Akarigbo of Remoland: The paramount ruler of (33) towns and villages that makes up Remo division, with several Obas under the leadership of The Akarigbo. The present Akarigbo is Oba Babatunde Adewale Ajayi, Torungbuwa II, who ascended the throne on 7 December 2017 as the 19th Akarigbo of Remoland. The seat of the Akarigbo is in Shagamu.

They are industrious and known to be thrifty. Many industrialists in Nigeria are of Ijebu stock. This includes Chief Adeola Odutola, Senator Jubril Martins-Kuye, Chief Okusanya Okunowo, Mike Adenuga, Bisi Rodipe abe others.

== Ojude Oba ==
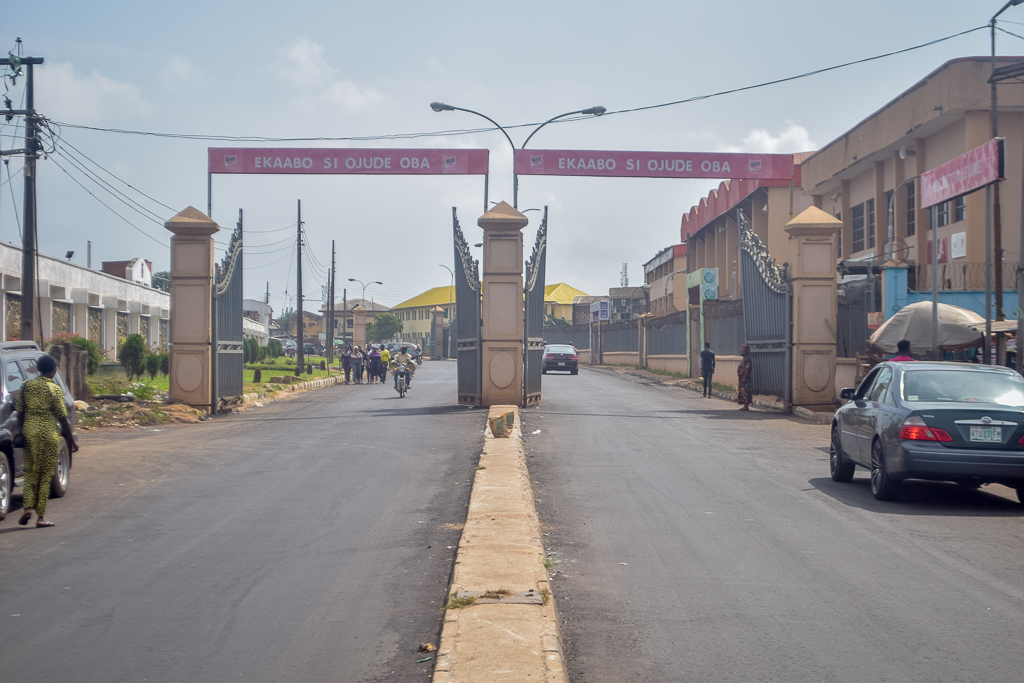
Entrance into Palace

A notable ceremony by the people of Ijebu is Ojude Oba, meaning "The King's Forecourt,". It is an ancient festival celebrated by the Yoruba people of Ijebu-Ode, a prominent town in Ogun State, Southwestern Nigeria. Held annually on the third day after Eid al-Kabir (Ileya), the festival is an occasion for paying homage and showing respect to the Awujale, the traditional ruler of Ijebuland. Renowned for its deep spiritual significance and vibrant displays, Ojude Oba stands as one of the most prestigious and celebrated festivals in both Ijebuland and Ogun State at large.

== Dialect ==
Ijebu dialect

The Ijebus speak a distinctive dialect that belongs to the South-East group of Yoruboid dialects. Some notable features of the dialect are that /ĩ/ and /ʊ̃/ have become /ɛ̃/ and /ɔ̃/ instead of /ĩ/ and /ũ/ like in Standard Yoruba. For example, ọkùnrin (man) becomes ọkùnrẹn. It has also retained the /ɣ/ and /gw/ contrast in some contexts, but has merged them into /w/ in others. For example, awọ is pronounced aghọ, but wọ́n is not pronounced ghan.

Another difference between Ijebu and Standard Yoruba is the use of certain region-specific vocabulary. For example, the word 'all' in Standard Yoruba is gbogbo, but in Ijebu one would use dede. In Ijebu, the plural you pronoun, 'ẹ/ẹ̀yin' in Standard Yoruba, is wẹn/ẹ̀wẹn instead. Also, instead of using 'wa' as the pronoun for us, Ijebu uses ẹni.

The last notable difference is the forming of the negative. In the Ijebu dialect, the negative particle is éè, but most pronouns would just repeat the last syllable to form the negative. For example, 'wẹ́n ̀ẹn mù' and 'wọn ̀ọ̀n mù' for 'You (pl.) don't know' and 'They don't know'. But the pronouns mo, I, and wo, you (sing.), combine with it to form méè and wéè.

== Notable people ==
- Wizkid: Global music artiste
- Olamide: Global music artiste
- Anthony Joshua: Boxing Champion
- Kwam 1: Popular Fuji artiste
- DJ Jimmy Jatt: Nigerian Disc Jockey
- Tobi Amusan: Nigerian sprinter
- Eniola Badmus: Nollywood actress
- Hubert Ogunde: Nigerian actor and playwriter
- Mike Adenuga: Yoruba Billionaire and Business Mogul
- Buruji Kashamu: Nigerian Politician (1958-2020)
