= Ijebu Ode =

City in Ogun state, Nigeria

Ijebu-Ode
- LGA; City
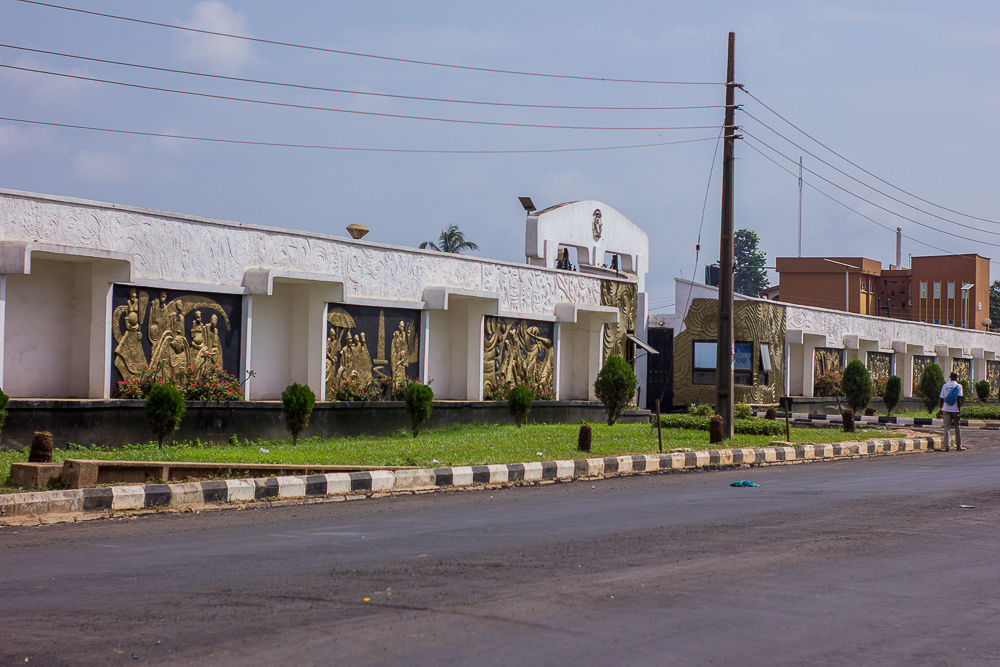
- Wall of Oba Palace, Ijebu-Ode
- Interactive map of Ijebu-Ode
- Location within Nigeria
- Coordinates: 6°49′15″N 3°55′15″E
- Country: Nigeria
- State: Ogun

Government
  - Type: Democratic
  - Awujale: Oba Sikiru Kayode Adetona, Ogbagba Agbotewole II
  - Local Government Chairman: Dare Alebiosu(APC)

Area
  - Total: 192 km^{2} (74 sq mi)

Population (2024)
  - Total: 394,246
  - Density: 2,050/km^{2} (5,320/sq mi)
- Time zone: UTC+1 (WAT)
- 3-digit postal code prefix: 120
- Area code: 120101
- Predominant language: English, Ijebu

Ijebu-Ode is a city and Local government area in Ogun State, South West Nigeria, close to the A121 highway. The city is located 110 km by road northeast of Lagos; it is within 100 km (62 mi) of the Atlantic Ocean in the eastern part of Ogun State and possesses a warm tropical climate.

According to the Britannica, by the 16th century, it was established as the chief town. Since pre-colonial times, it has been the capital of the Ijebu kingdom. There are around 2,119,221 Ijebus in south-west Nigeria, in Lagos and Ogun States. It has an estimated population of 394,246 (2024). It is home to Sungbo's Eredo one of the largest ramparts in West Africa.

As with most Ijebus, people from Ijebu Ode have a nationwide reputation of being natural entrepreneurs. The primary cultural food is "Ikokore".

== History ==
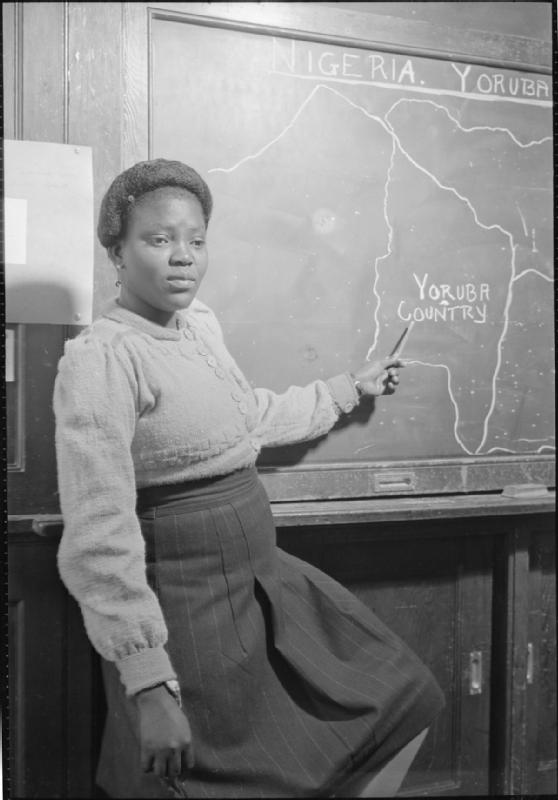
1946 picture of Miss Adebonojo, a winner of Nigerian Teacher's Certificate

The largest city inhabited by the Ijebus, an ethnic group who speak the Ijebu Language, is historically and culturally the headquarters of Ijebuland. The name "Ijebu-Ode" is a combination of the names of two persons, namely AJEBU and OLODE, who were conspicuous as leaders of the original settlers and founders of the town. Today, however, due to migration, colonization, and inter-tribal marriage, Ijebu-Ode is now composed of a mixed people who majorly speak the general Yoruba language, as opposed to the local dialect. In 1891, the Ijebu tribe, dwelling between 50 and 60 miles northeast of Lagos on the Magbon River, set a blockade on the trade route from the interior into Lagos, which was a Crown Colony, and charged customs dues, which served as their income. The Awujale, the traditional ruler of Ijebu, closed down the Ejirin market, cutting off Lagos from a source of up-country trade. The British colonial government persuaded the Awujale several times to open the blockaded route, but the Ijebu ruler remained adamant. However, in May 1891, a British acting governor, Captain C.M. Denton, C.M.G., together with some Hausa troops (mostly slaves who fled the North to the South and were recruited by the British) went to the Ijebu kingdom to make an agreement with the Awujale on opening the blockaded route and allowing the free passage of goods into Lagos. The Awujale refused, but after much persuasion and pressure, the Awujale agreed in January 1892 on the terms of receiving £500 annually as compensation for the loss of customs revenue. However, the agreement didn't last long. A white missionary was denied access to pass through the kingdom and was sent back. The British colonial government was provoked by the action of the Ijebus and authorized the formation of an expeditionary force to attack the kingdom; the British gathered men from the Gold Coast, Sierra Leone, Ibadan, and Lagos (the Hausa troops numbering nearly 150 men).

=== British-Ijebu War ===
Also known as the Battle of Imagbon, a Colonel, F.C. Scott C.B., was the commander of the British expeditionary force numbering around 450 men. On 12 May 1892, the captain and his men, including some carriers, sailed up the Lagos Lagoon and landed at Epe. When they got to Lekki, another 186 soldiers were recruited. On the Ijebu side, 8,000 men, equipped with old rifles, were recruited to fight the British. The British underestimated the fighting prowess of the Ijebus, thus giving them a hard time penetrating into the interior of the Ijebu kingdom. On the first day of battle, the British captured and burnt four Ijebu-held villages, with some of their force sustaining fatal injuries. The next day, they proceeded to Atumba and, equipped with Maxim guns, engaged in a skirmish with Ijebu forces. The British lost 12 men, including a Briton and 11 Africans. Every Ijebu village they captured was subsequently burnt.

The Ijebus were sustaining heavy losses in battles thus far but were determined to prevent the British from crossing the Yemoji River. The goddess of the Yemoji River was said to have accepted human sacrifices in order to prevent the British from crossing. The river was dug deeper by the Ijebus to make it impenetrable by all means for the British. However, the British managed to cross the Yemoji River and unleashed havoc on the Ijebus. They proceeded to the Ijebu settlement of Imagbon. The Ijebus had lost over 900 men while the British lost only 56 men, with around 30 wounded. The Ijebus were still determined to fight on, but shortly afterward, the Awujale surrendered and admitted defeat.

The Union Flag was later raised above Ijebu Ode. Captain Scott warned his men against pillaging, which some didn't heed, especially the Ibadan irregulars, who were later deprived of their arms. The toll gates in Oru built by the Ijebus were destroyed, and some of their shrines were also torched. This conflict is also known in history as the 1892 Ijebu Expedition. All European members of the British expeditionary force were awarded the East & West Africa Medal with Clasp dated '1892'. Today, one of these medals can be found in Fitzwilliam Museum in Cambridge. Ijebu Kingdom was later annexed to the colony of Southern Nigeria.

== Monarch ==
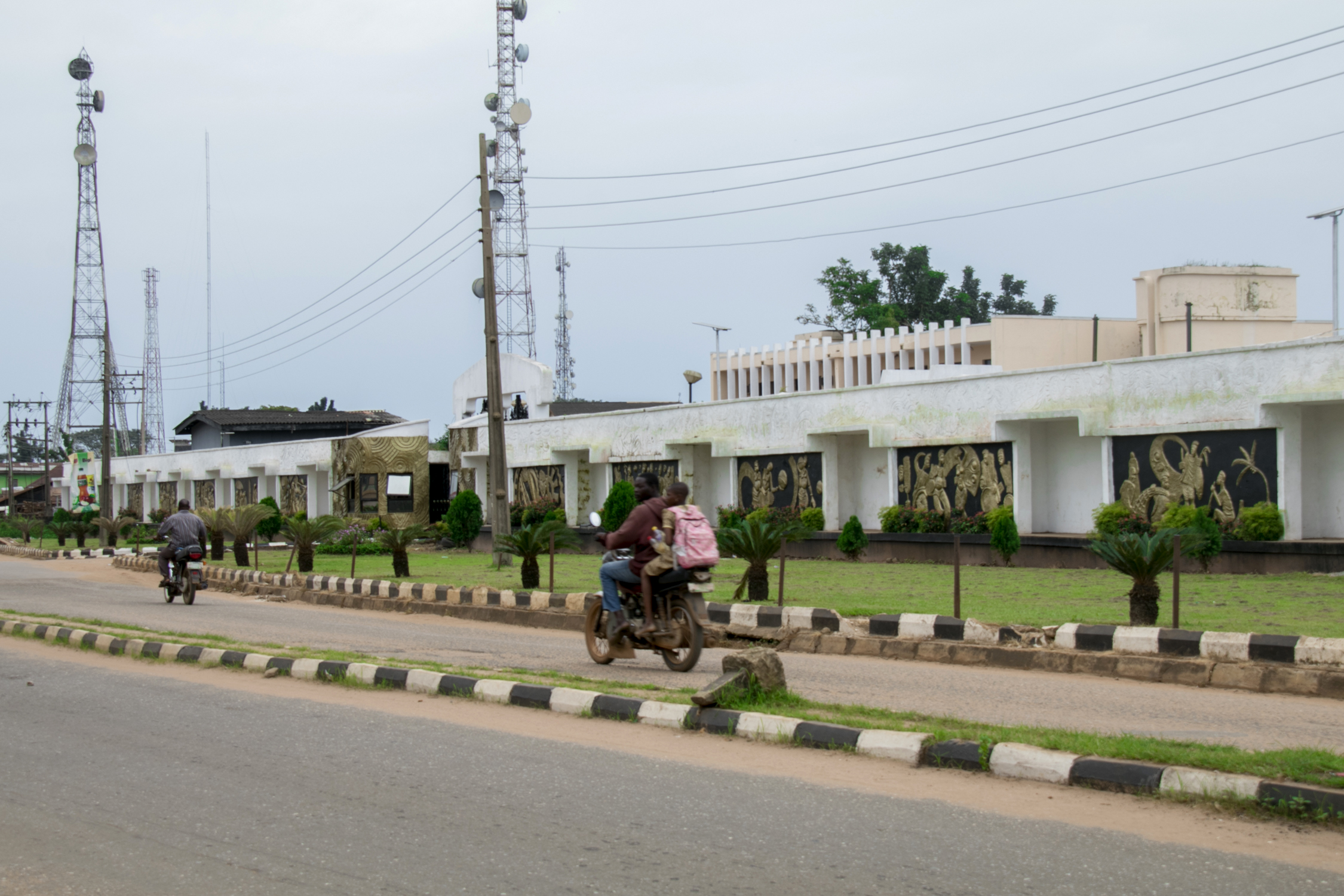
View of the palace in Ijebu Ode.

The ruler of the Ijebu Kingdom is known as the Awujale of Ijebuland and resides in Ijebu-Ode. He is regarded as the paramount ruler of Ijebu land, encompassing every town that is originally an Ijebu domain, including Ago-Iwoye, Ijebu-Igbo, Ososa, Oru, Awa, Imota Ranodu, known as the 10th son of Oluiwa, Ekewa Olu, Agbowa Iikosi, Émuren, Ijebu-Isiwo (pronounced Ijebu Ishiwo), Odogbolu, Aiyepe, Epe, and other Ijebu territories. Natives and residents of these towns highly revere the Awujale.

== Town structure ==
Adjacent to Ijebu Ode are several smaller towns and villages. They are mostly referred to as Egure "small settlement"; some of them include Odo-Agamegi, Ogbo, Italupe (a neighbourhood within Ijebu-Ode), Ososa, Imomo, Imawen, Odo Ogbun, Apa (Mesan), Okelamuren, Abapawa, Erunwon, Apunren, Isonyin, Imoru, Oke-Eri, Imagbon, Ijebu-Isiwo (pronounced Ijebu-Ishiwo), Okorogbin (a village before Ijebu-Ishiwo), Okemoyin (a village within Ijebu-Isiwo), Odo-lewu, Odo-sengolu (a village within Odo-lewu), Odo-Arawa, Idowa, Iworo, Ala, Atiba and Ibefun among others. Ijebu-Ode is made up of three parts: Iwade, Ijasi, and Porogun. Italupe is a ward in Iwade, not an Egure of Ijebu Ode. The town has 39 Public Primary Schools, 14 public junior secondary schools, 13 public Senior Secondary Schools, 110 approved Private Nursery and Primary Schools, and 22 approved Private Secondary Schools. Ijebu Ode has a local television station affiliated with the government's NTA network and is the trade center of a farming region where yam, cassava, grain, tobacco and cotton are grown.

== Climate ==
Ijebu Ode has a tropical savanna climate (Köppen: Aw). The most popular time to visit is January, May, July, August, September, October, November, December.

Climate data for Ijebu Ode (1991–2020)
Month	Jan	Feb	Mar	Apr	May	Jun	Jul	Aug	Sep	Oct	Nov	Dec	Year
Record high °C (°F)	37.4 (99.3)	39.4 (102.9)	39 (102)	37 (99)	36 (97)	33.9 (93.0)	32.9 (91.2)	32.6 (90.7)	33 (91)	34 (93)	35.6 (96.1)	39.4 (102.9)	39.4 (102.9)
Mean daily maximum °C (°F)	33.4 (92.1)	34.7 (94.5)	34.2 (93.6)	33.1 (91.6)	31.9 (89.4)	30.2 (86.4)	28.6 (83.5)	28.3 (82.9)	29.2 (84.6)	30.6 (87.1)	32.4 (90.3)	33.2 (91.8)	31.6 (88.9)
Daily mean °C (°F)	27.9 (82.2)	29.3 (84.7)	29.3 (84.7)	28.7 (83.7)	27.8 (82.0)	26.6 (79.9)	25.7 (78.3)	25.4 (77.7)	26.0 (78.8)	26.7 (80.1)	27.9 (82.2)	27.9 (82.2)	27.4 (81.3)
Mean daily minimum °C (°F)	22.4 (72.3)	23.9 (75.0)	24.5 (76.1)	24.3 (75.7)	23.7 (74.7)	22.8 (73.0)	22.7 (72.9)	22.6 (72.7)	22.5 (72.5)	22.5 (72.5)	22.2 (72.0)	22.7 (72.9)	23.1 (73.6)
Record low °C (°F)	15 (59)	15 (59)	18 (64)	20.4 (68.7)	17.8 (64.0)	19 (66)	19.8 (67.6)	20 (68)	19 (66)	20 (68)	19 (66)	13.2 (55.8)	13.2 (55.8)
Average precipitation mm (inches)	10.2 (0.40)	48.7 (1.92)	86.3 (3.40)	121.0 (4.76)	183.3 (7.22)	282.0 (11.10)	270.9 (10.67)	138.2 (5.44)	269.4 (10.61)	241.9 (9.52)	52.4 (2.06)	10.4 (0.41)	1,714.6 (67.50)
Average precipitation days (≥ 1.0 mm)	1.2	2.6	6.5	7.9	10.8	15.0	14.9	11.8	15.5	15.4	4.4	0.9	106.9
Average relative humidity (%)	77.84	81.62	86.21	88.73	90.01	90.85	90.44	89.63	90.48	90.30	86.55	80.02	86.9
Source: NOAA

== Landmarks and places ==
- Ijebu Ode Grammar School
- Sungbo's Eredo
- Imagbon

== Festivals ==
Agemo is the unity of Ijebus. There are 16 Agemos in various parts of Ijebu. They come out every July, and they all meet at Ijebu-Ode before moving to Imodi Mosan, where the Agemo Festival takes place. The Agemo of Ijebu-Isiwo is called Petu-Ado (short form Petu). Agemo festival has masquerades and is a performing art of the Yoruba religion. Women are forbidden from seeing the Agemo on their way to Ijebu-Ode. A public announcement is made on radio and television to inform everyone of the exact time Agemo will be moving. The Ojude Oba festival of Ijebu-Ode is usually held two days after the Ileya festival. In comparison, the Ojude Oba festival of Ijebu-Isiwo is usually held three days after the Ileya. Horses with beautiful and vintage carts are usually paraded on the streets of Ijebu Ode in the hours of the morning, and eventually, they ride to the palace of the king to celebrate. It is a festival whose main purpose is for the people of Ijebu to come together as one to honor their king and is regarded as one of the biggest in West Africa.

== Notable people ==
The following is a list of notable people who were either born in, lived in, are current residents of, or are otherwise closely associated with or around the city of Ijebu Ode, Ogun State, Nigeria.

- Beatrice Aboyade, Nigerian librarian
- Professor Adebayo Adedeji, Nigerian economist and academic
- Joseph Adefarasin, Nigerian High Court judge
- Paul Adefarasin, Pastor, convener of The Experience (gospel concert) and founder of House on the Rock (church)
- Adebowale Adefuye, Nigerian historian and diplomat
- Sunday Adelaja, Founder of the Embassy of God in Kyiv
- Oluyemi Adeniji †, a Nigerian diplomat
- Sikiru Kayode Adetona, Awujale of the Ijebu kingdom
- Tobi Amusan, Nigerian sprinter and 2022 world Athletics Championship 100 metres hurdles champion
- Mobolaji Bank Anthony†, Businessman and philanthropist
- Eniola Badmus, Nigerian actress
- Subomi Balogun, Nigerian banker, philanthropist and founder of FCMB
- Harold Olusegun Demuren, National celebrated Aeronautical Engineer
- DJ Jimmy Jatt, Nigerian disc jockey
- Jidex, Nigerian Streamer and TikToker
- Ginger Johnson, Nigerian bandleader and percussionist
- Abiodun Koya, American-based Opera Singer and Songwriter
- Aderemi Kuku OON, Mathematician and academic
- Gasper Lawal, multi-instrumentalist
- Omololu Meroyi, Politician
- Abayomi Mighty, Public Speaker, United Nations Spokesperson for African Youth and Children (April 2001)
- Adeola Odutola †, Nigerian businessman
- Hubert Ogunde†, Nigerian actor and playwright
- Ade Olufeko, Multidisciplinary contributor to Sungbo's Eredo
- Esther Olukoya and Emily Ogunde, Identical twin centenarians
- Jelili Adebisi Omotola†, Educator and Senior Advocate of Nigeria (SAN)
- Aina Onabolu†, Nigerian modern arts teacher and painter
- Kola Onadipe (1922–1988), Nigerian children's author
- Abiola Onakoya, Nigerian sprinter
- Freeman Osonuga, Nigerian physician, humanitarian and public speaker
- Yusuf Otubanjo, Nigerian footballer
- Victor Adenuga Oyenuga†, Nigerian Professor Emeritus
- Idowu Philips, Nigerian veteran actress
- Olikoye Ransome-Kuti †, Activist, and health minister of Nigeria
- Festus Segun†, Nigerian Anglican Bishop
- Wizkid, Nigerian Recording and Musical Artist

== Photo Gallery of Ijebu Ode ==
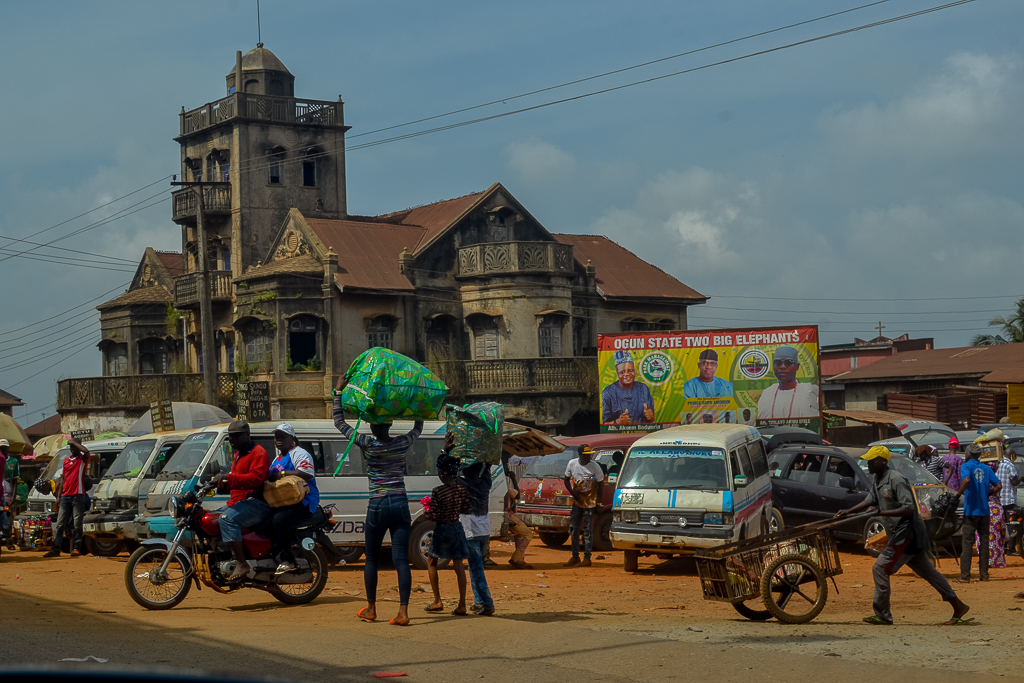

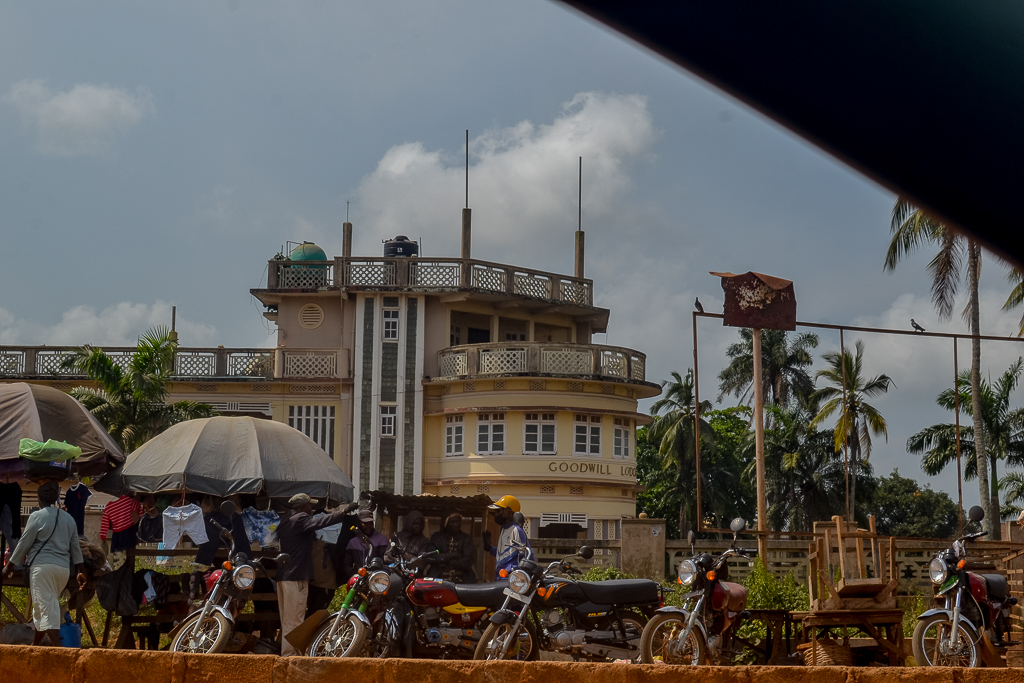

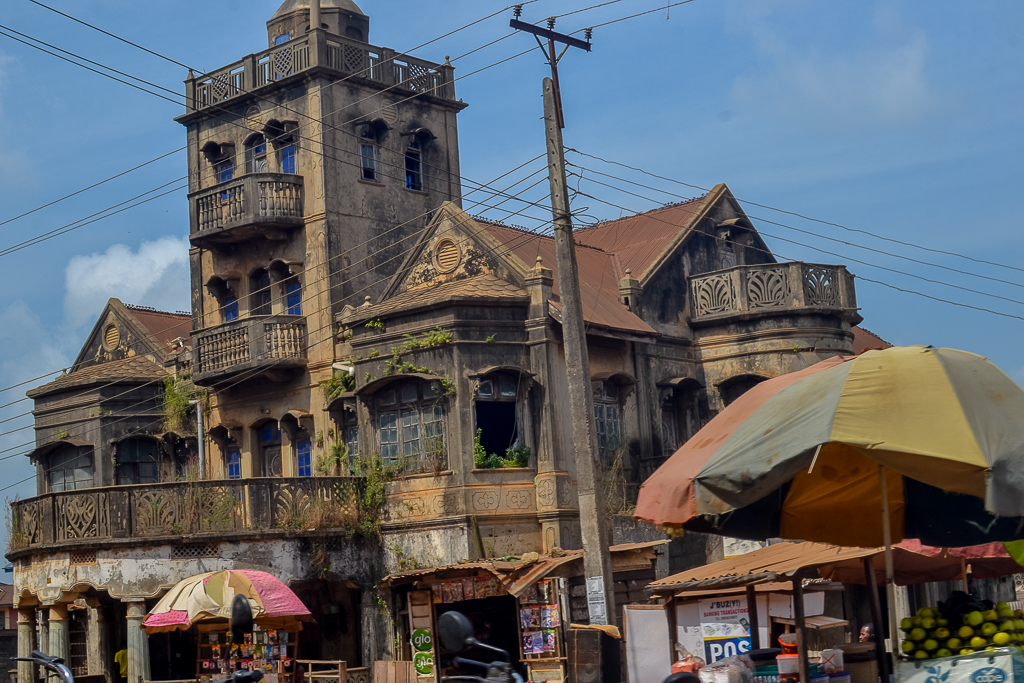

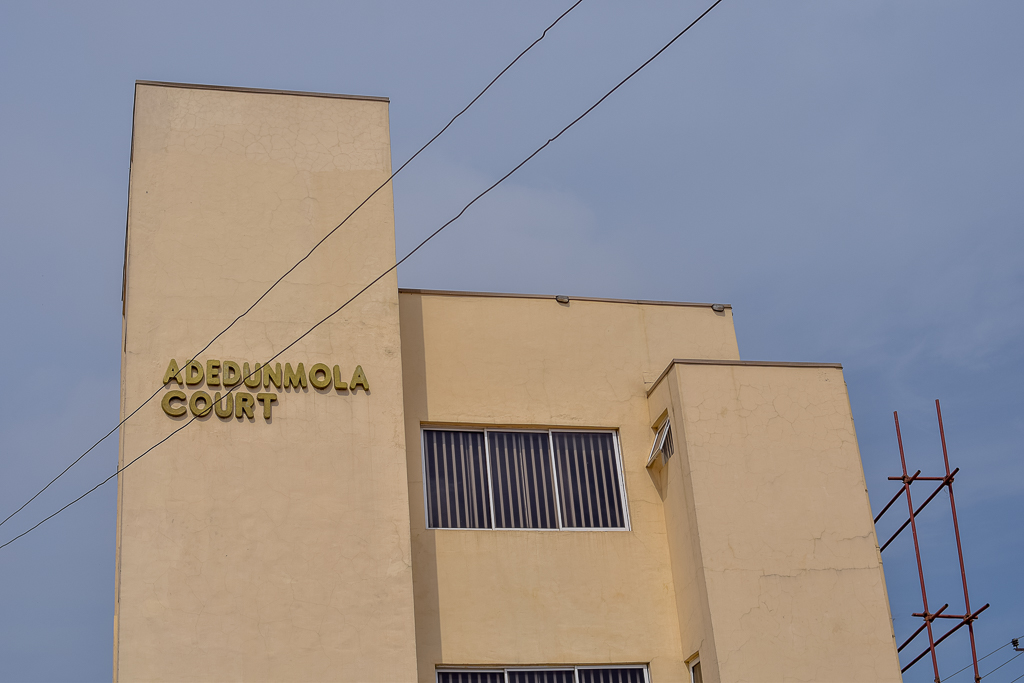

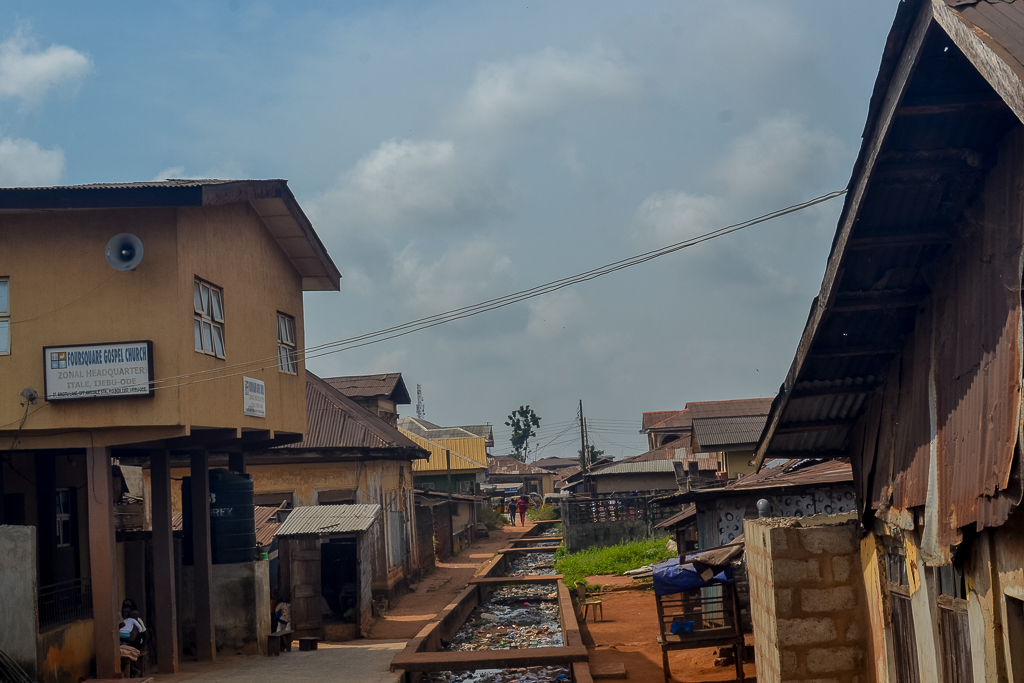

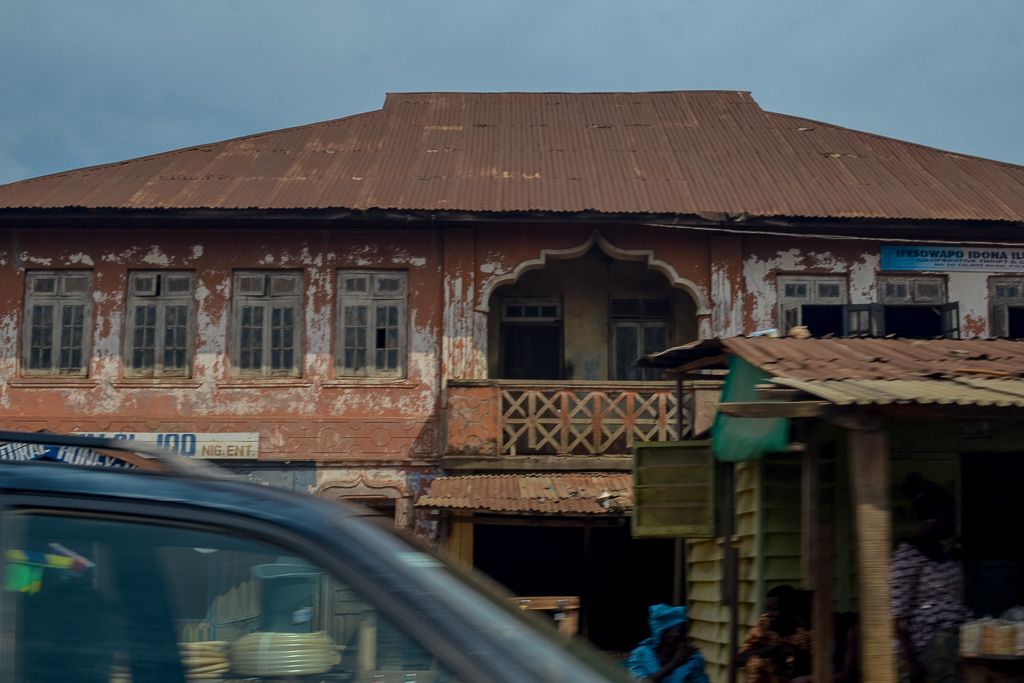

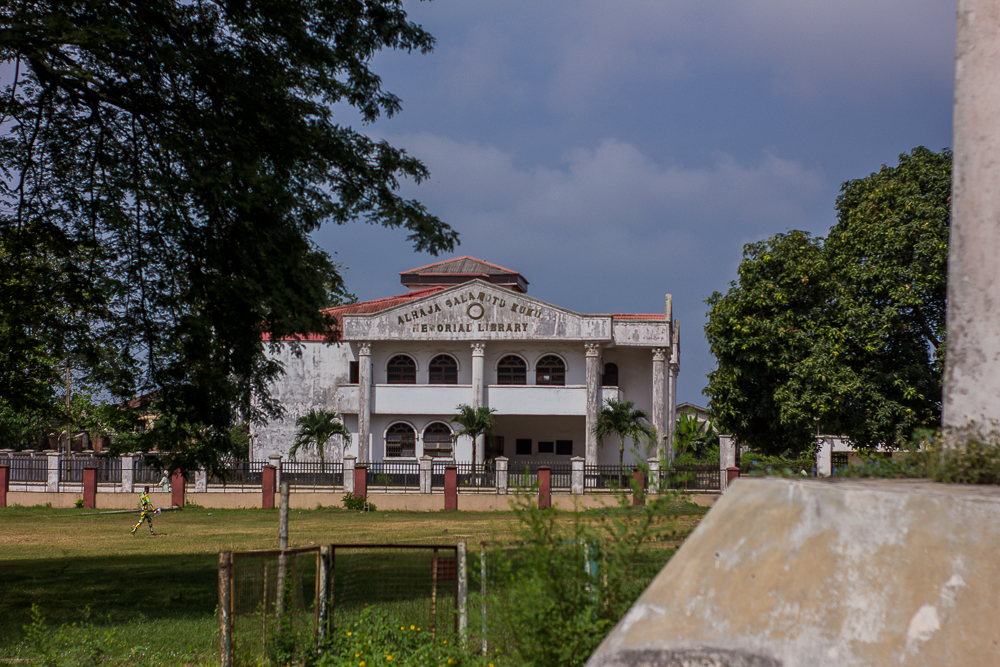

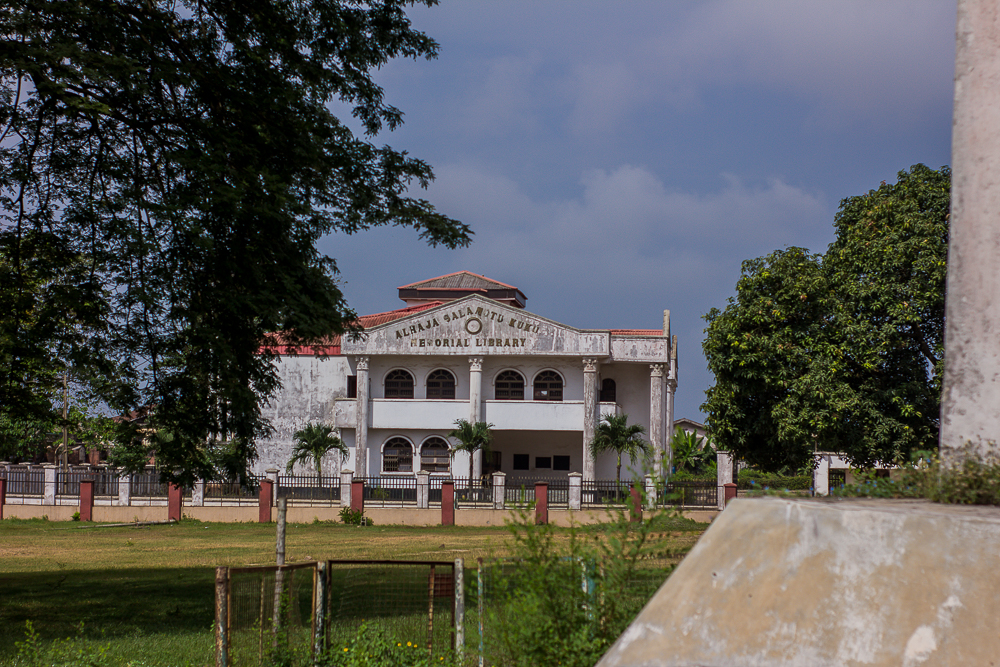

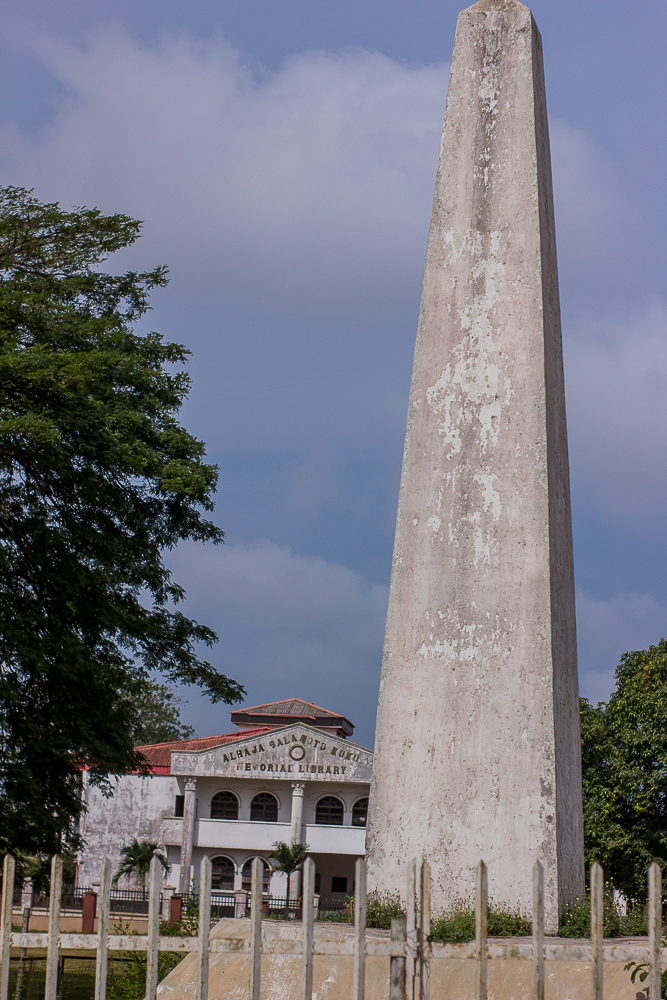

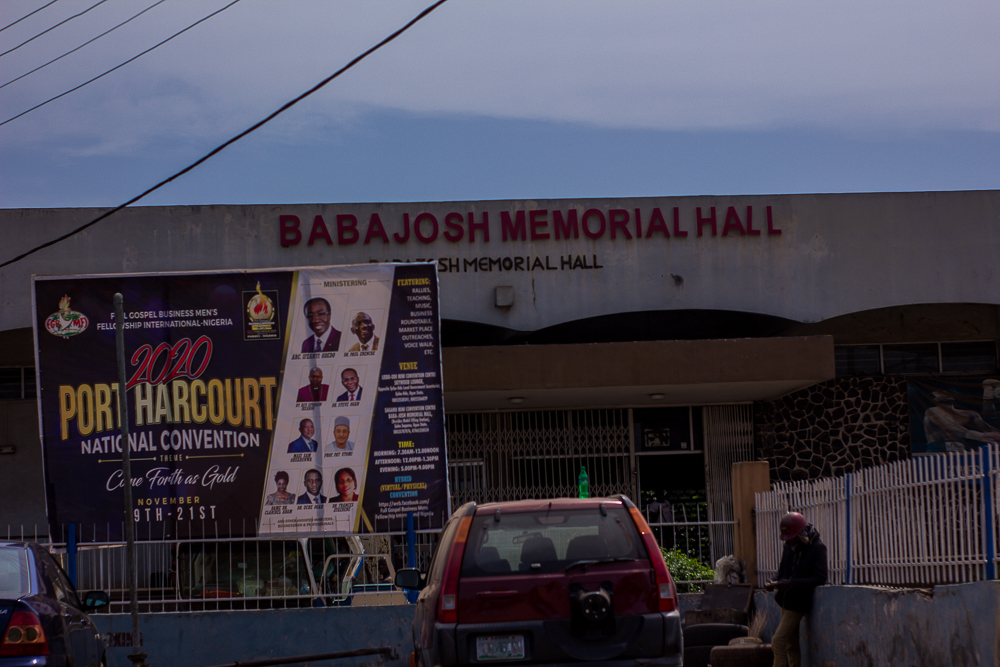

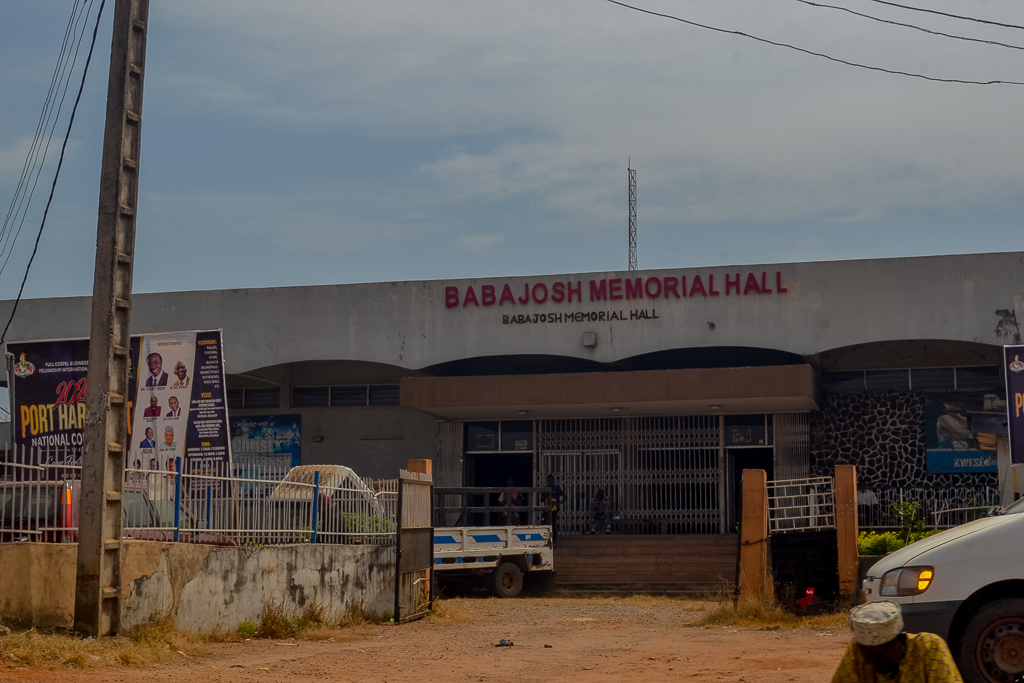

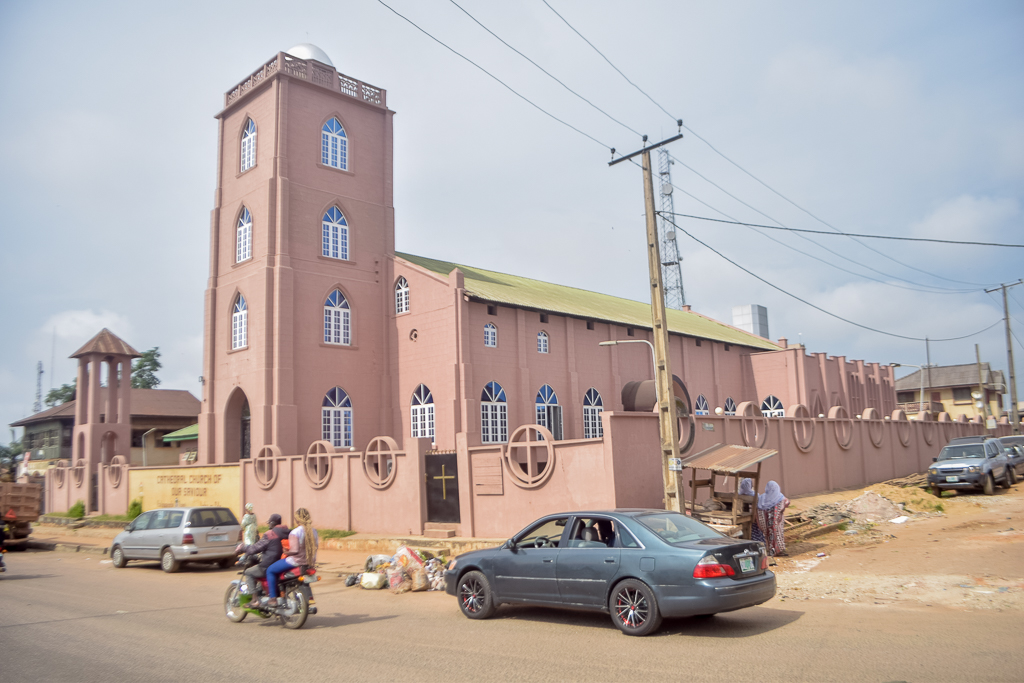

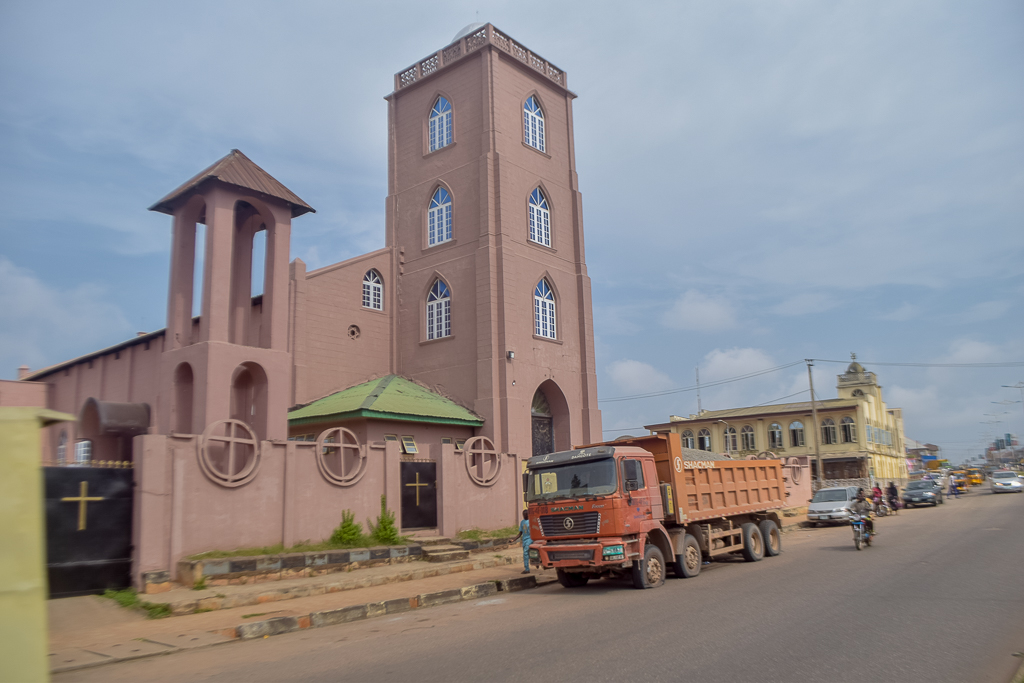

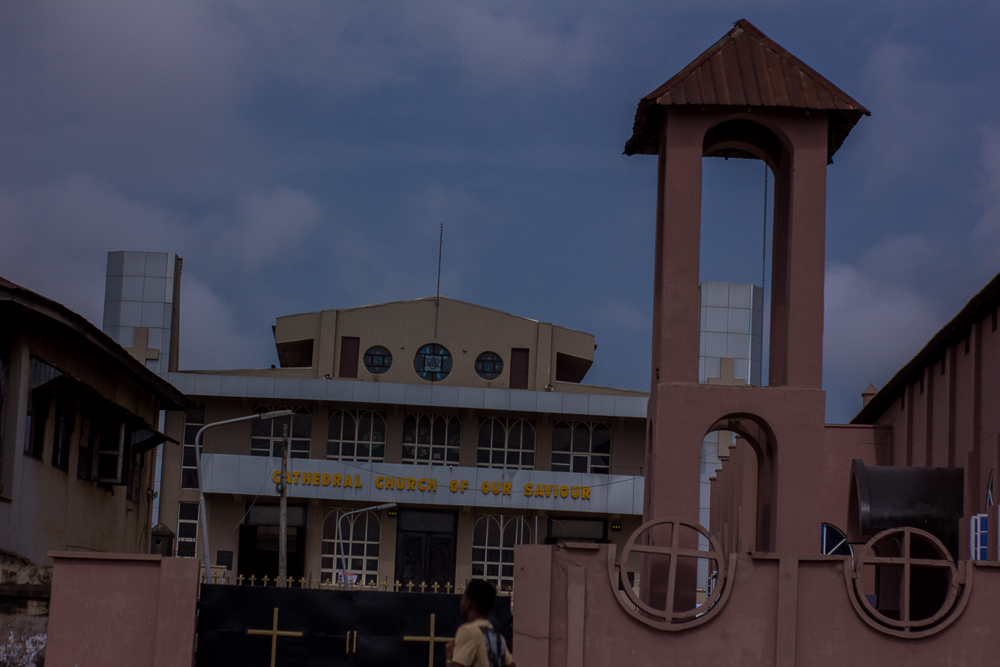

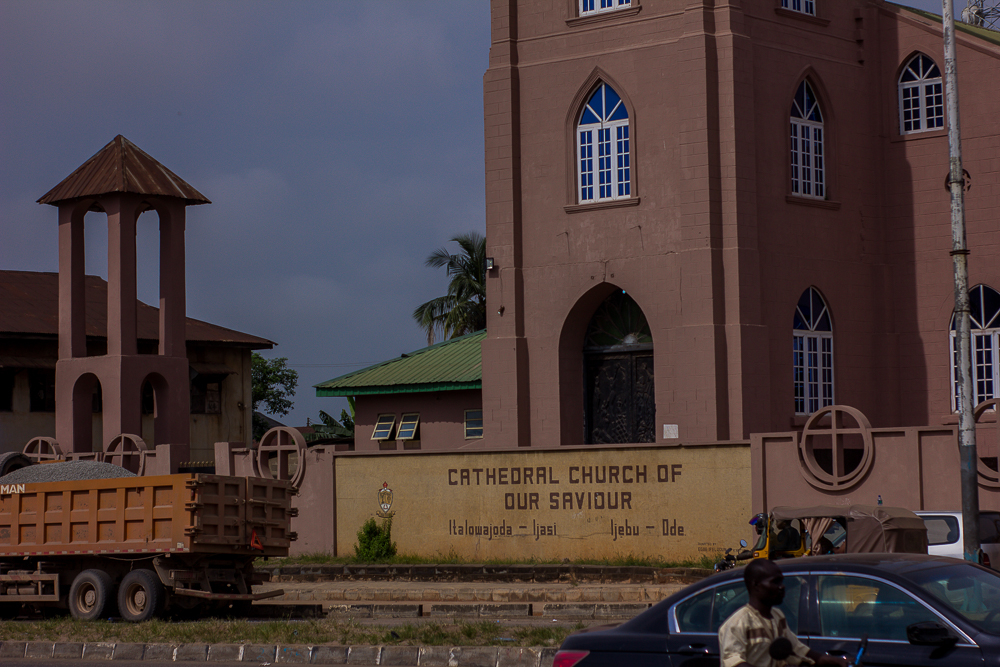

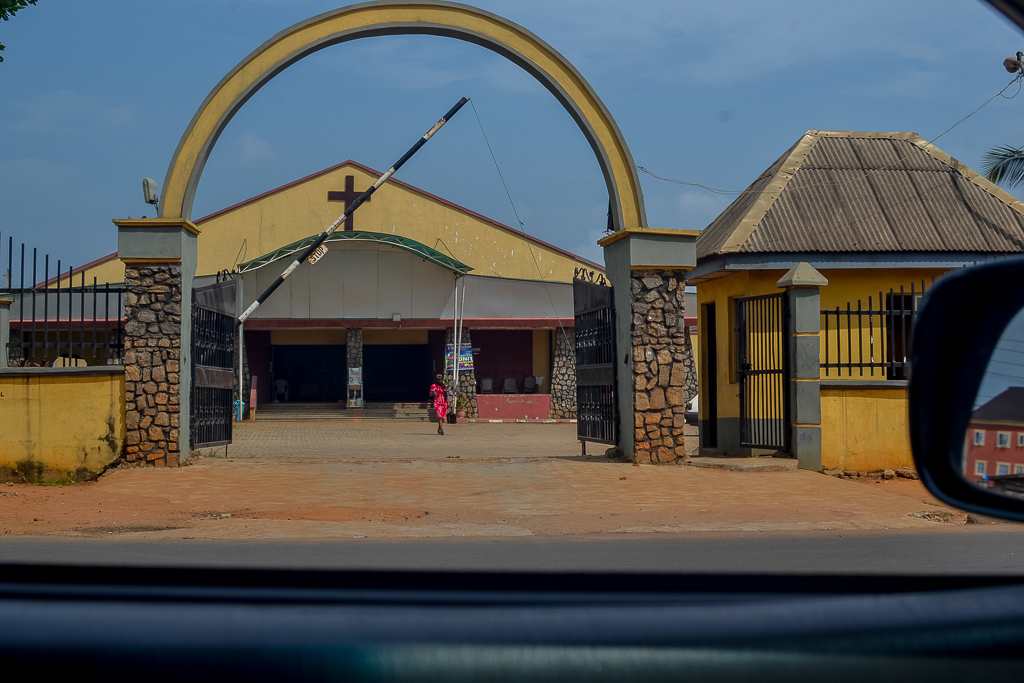

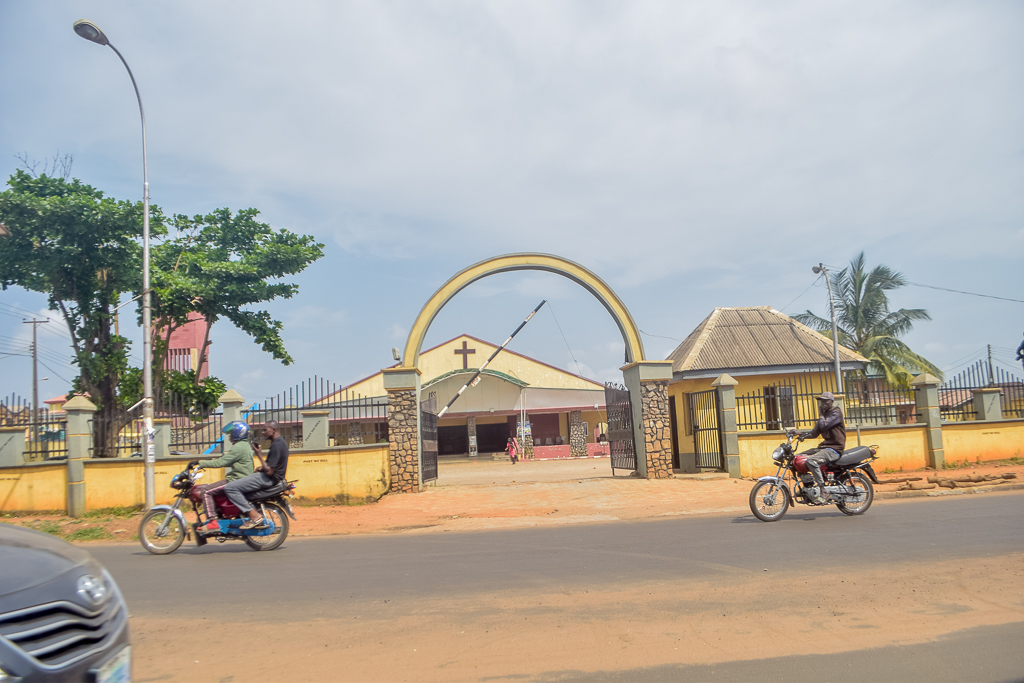

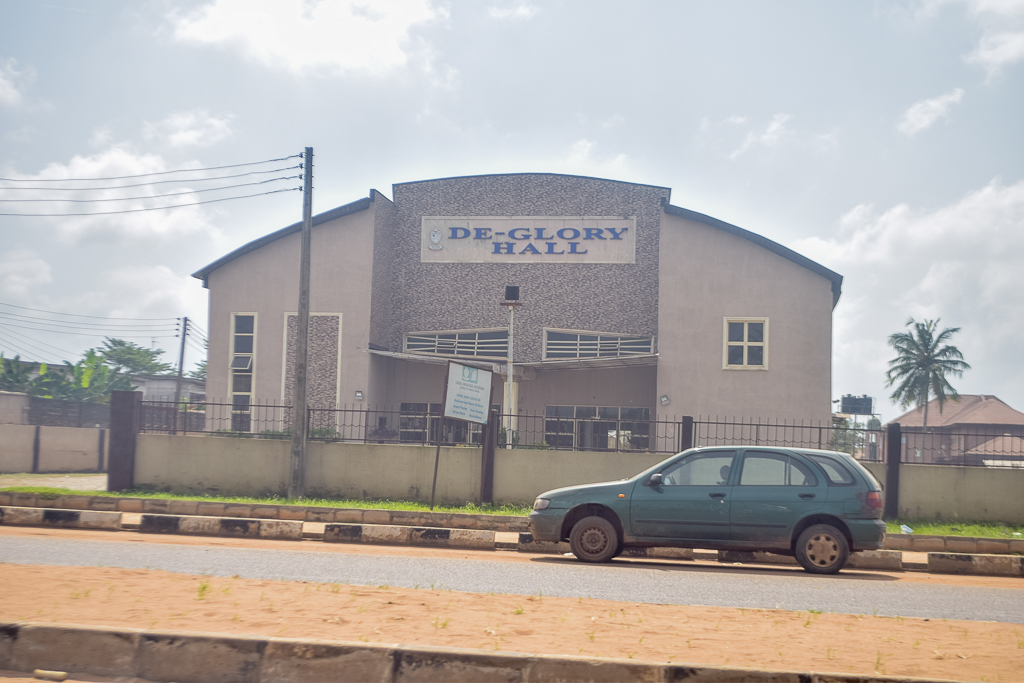

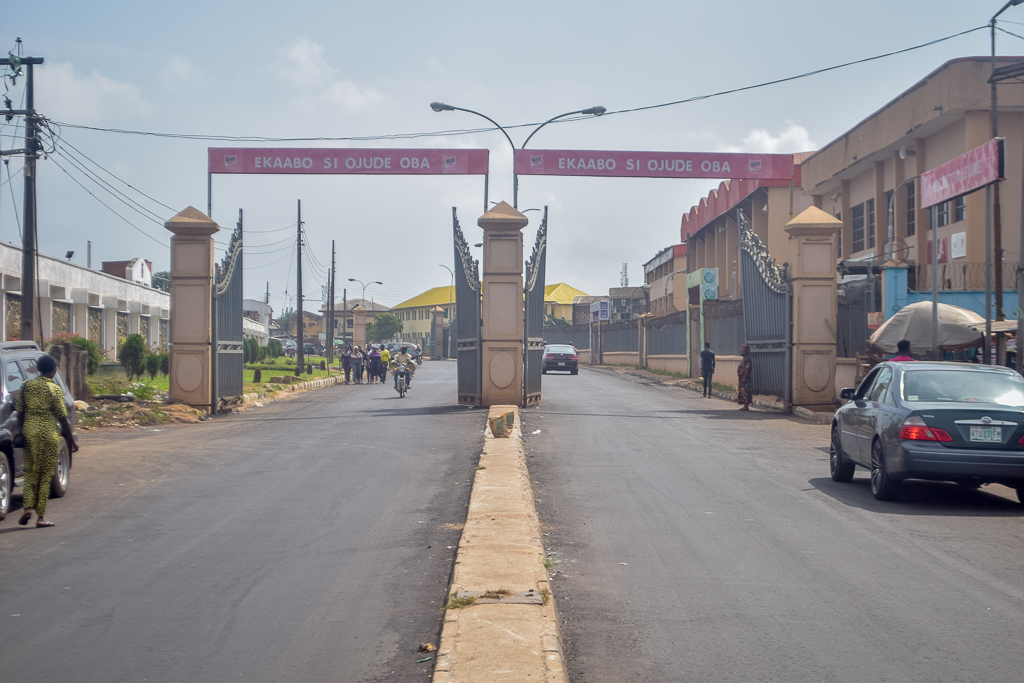

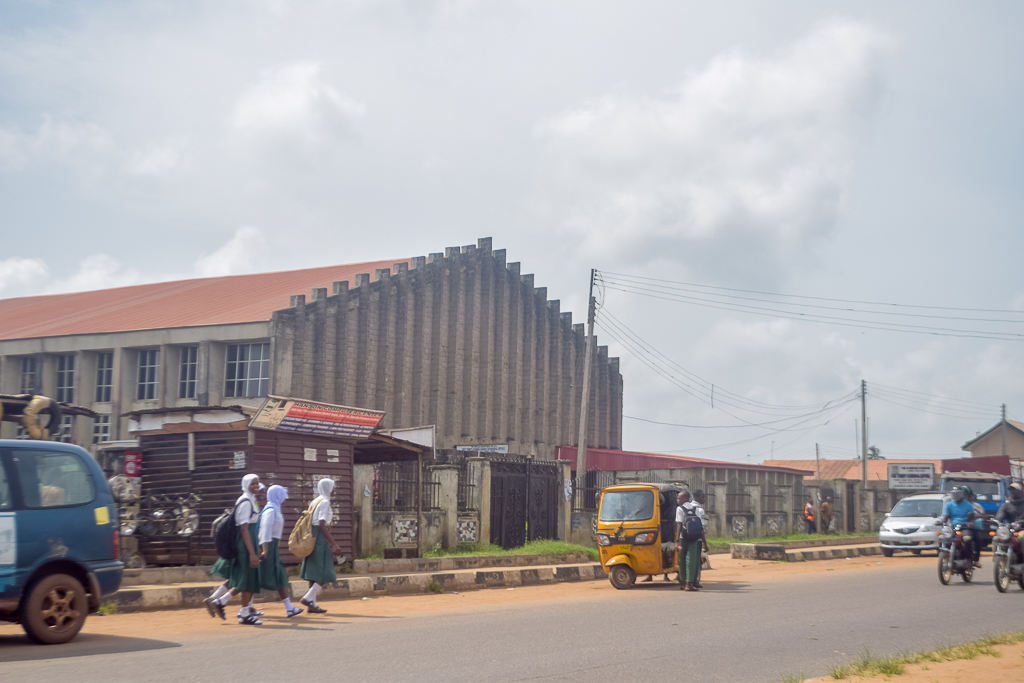

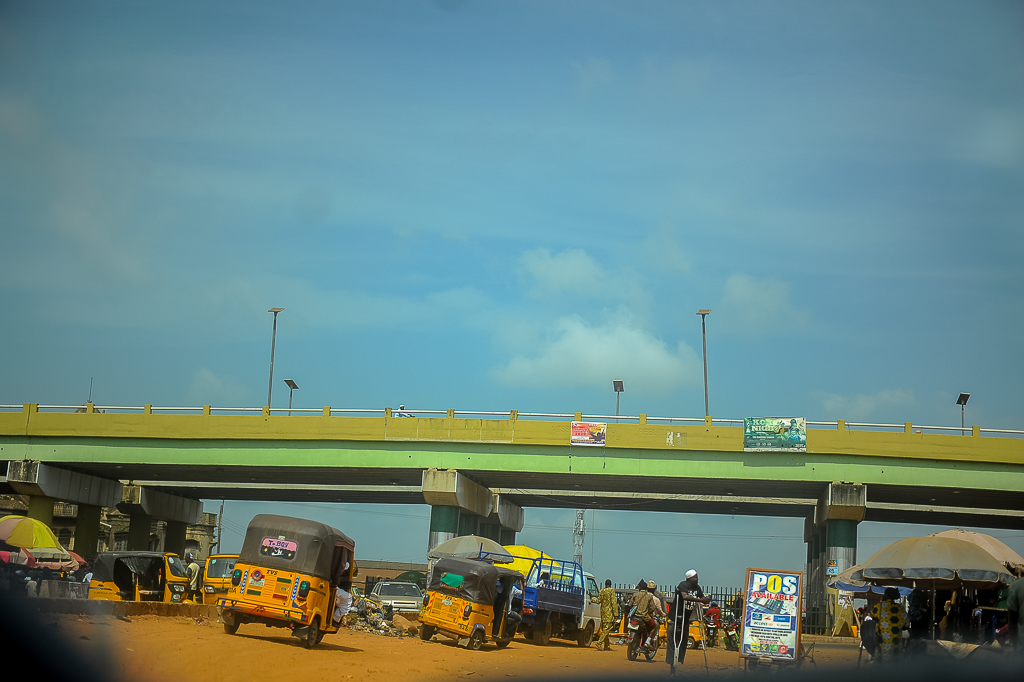

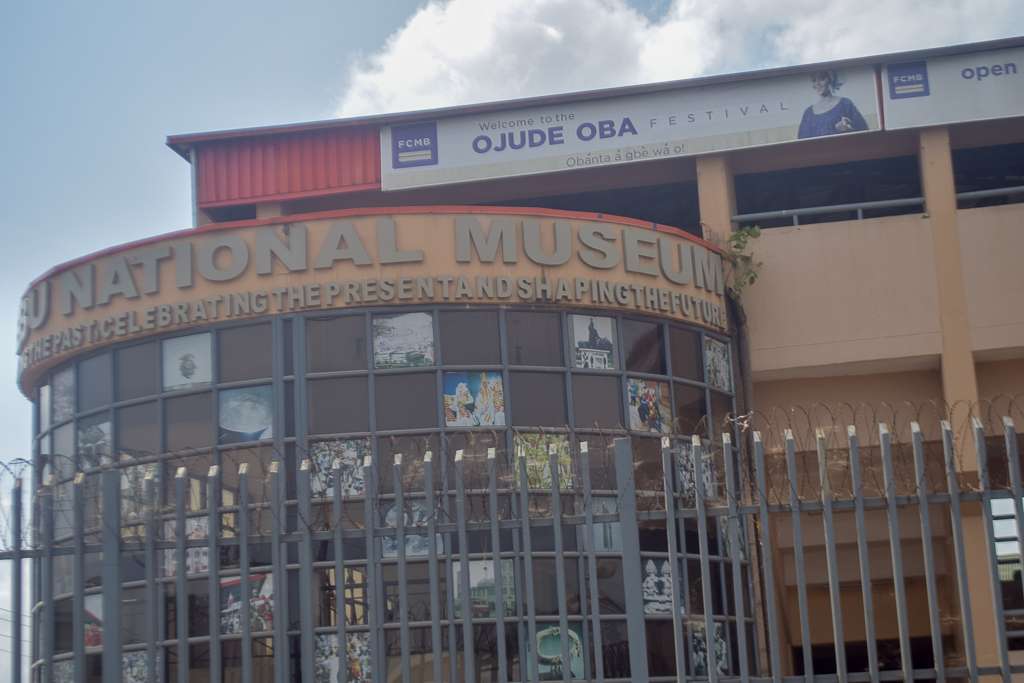

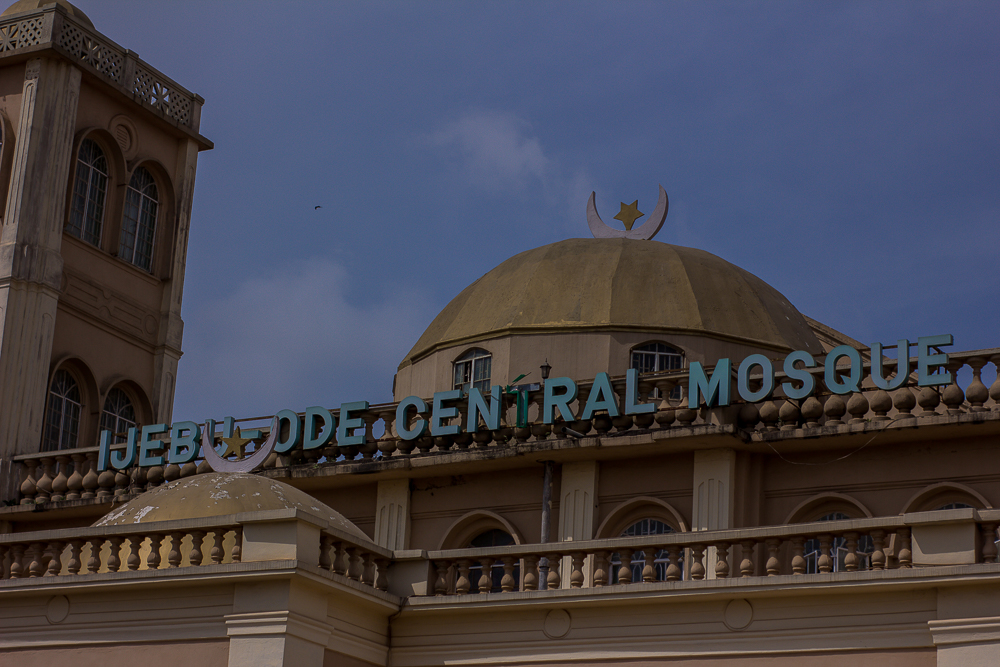

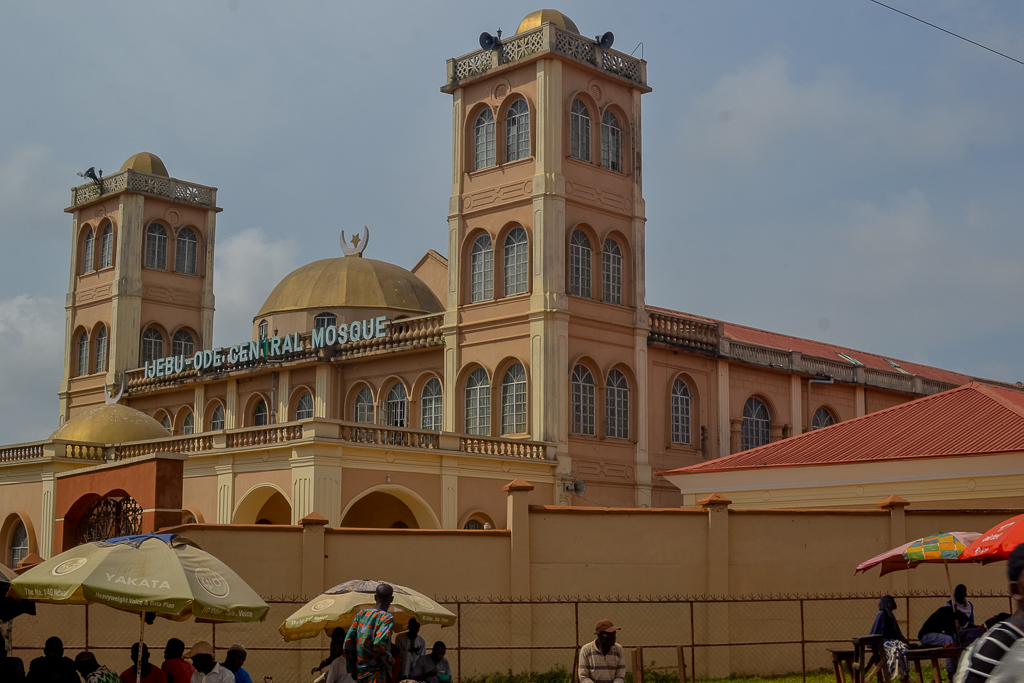

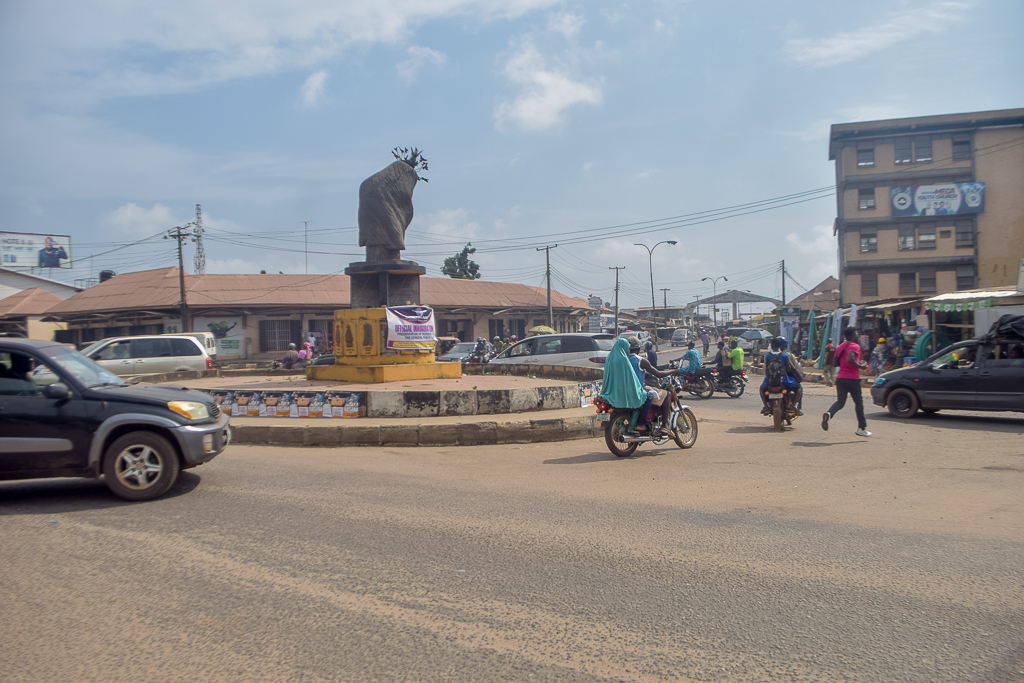

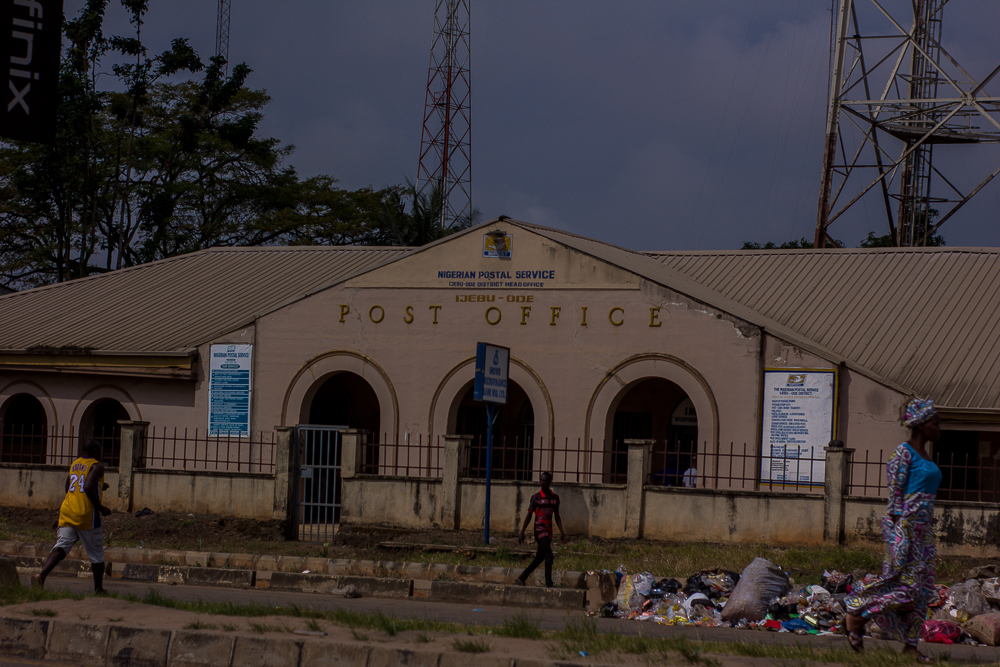

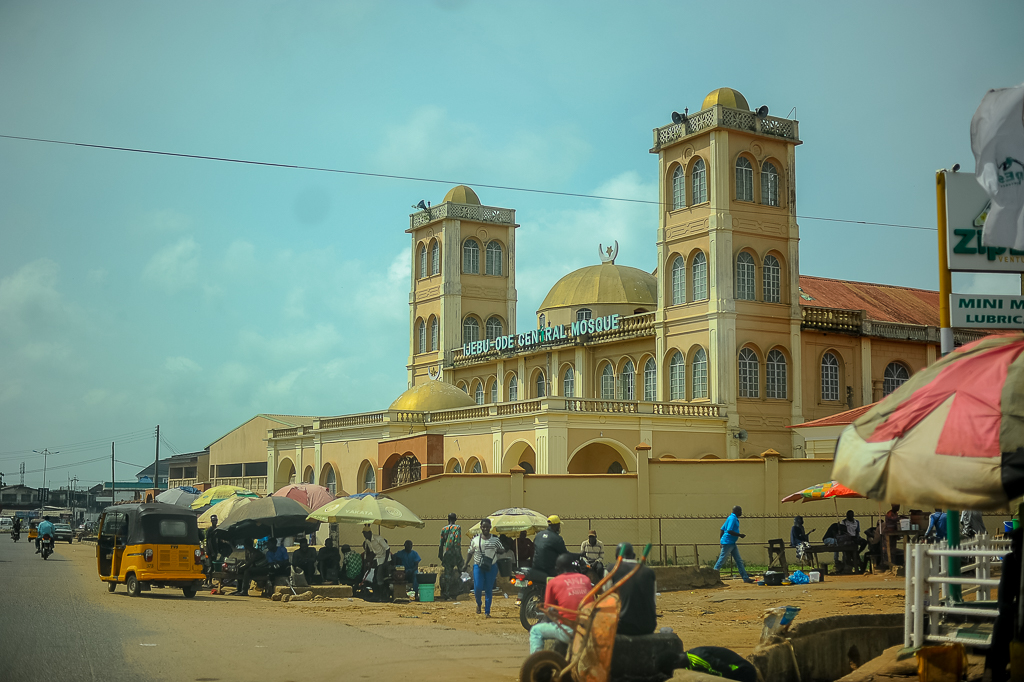

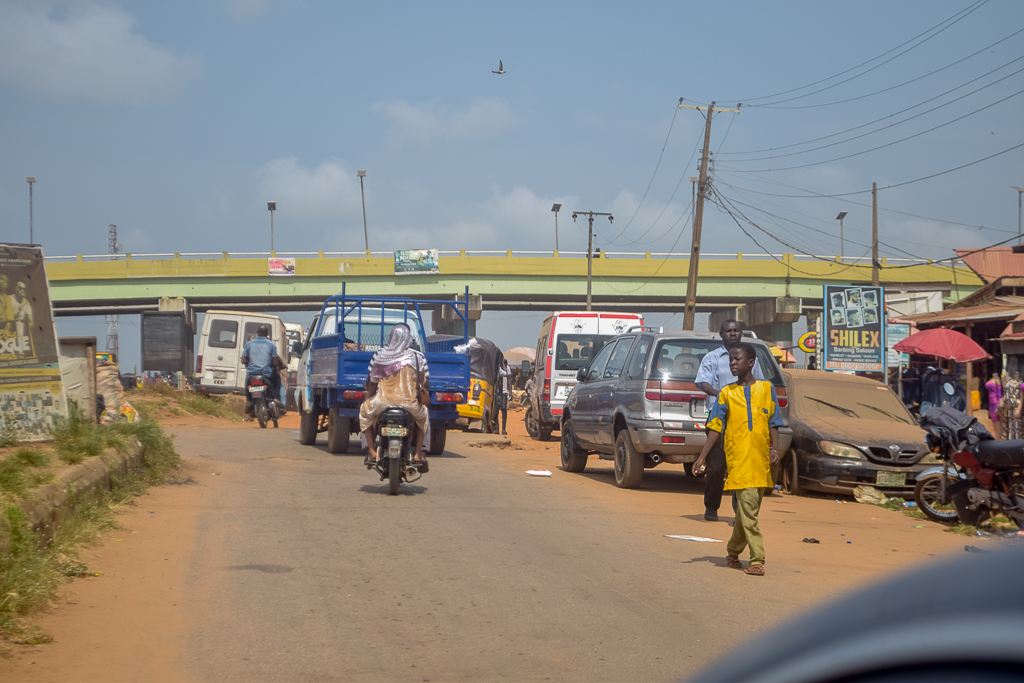

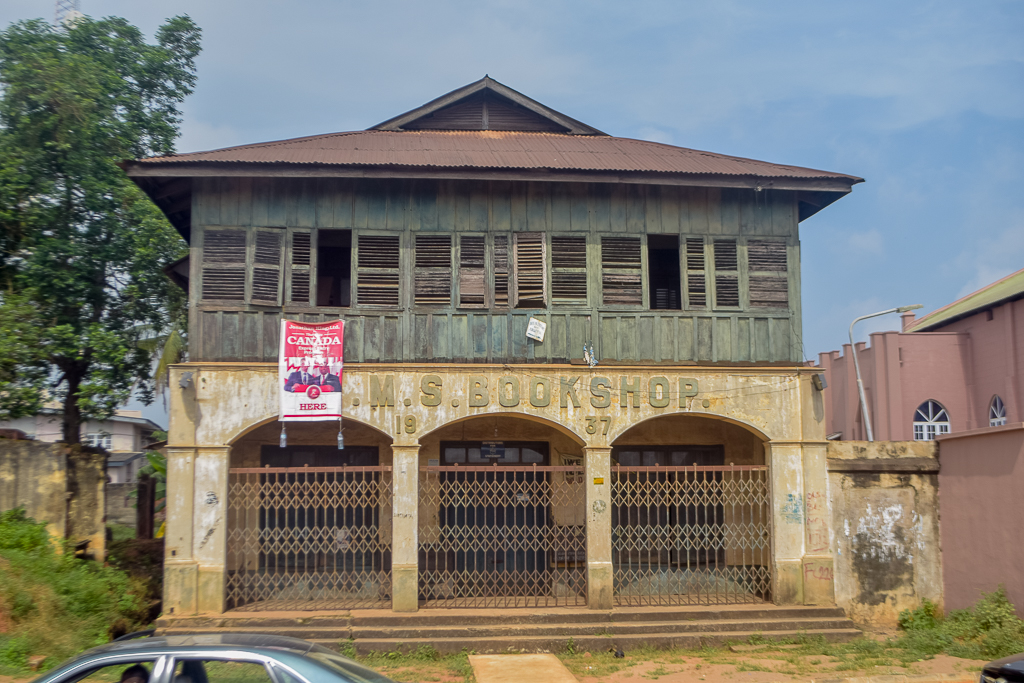

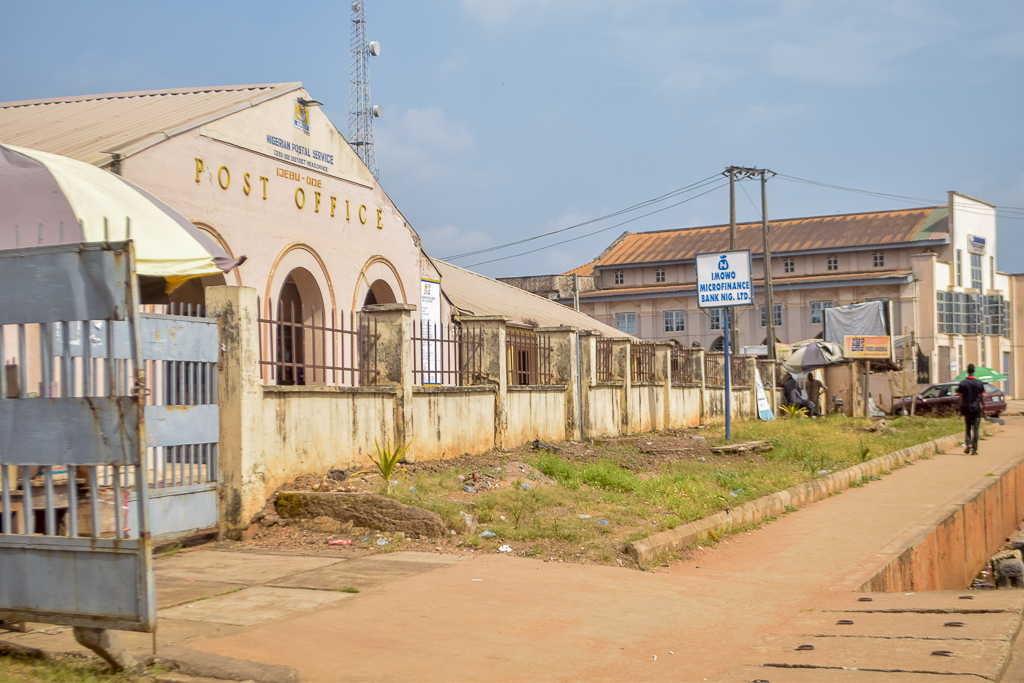

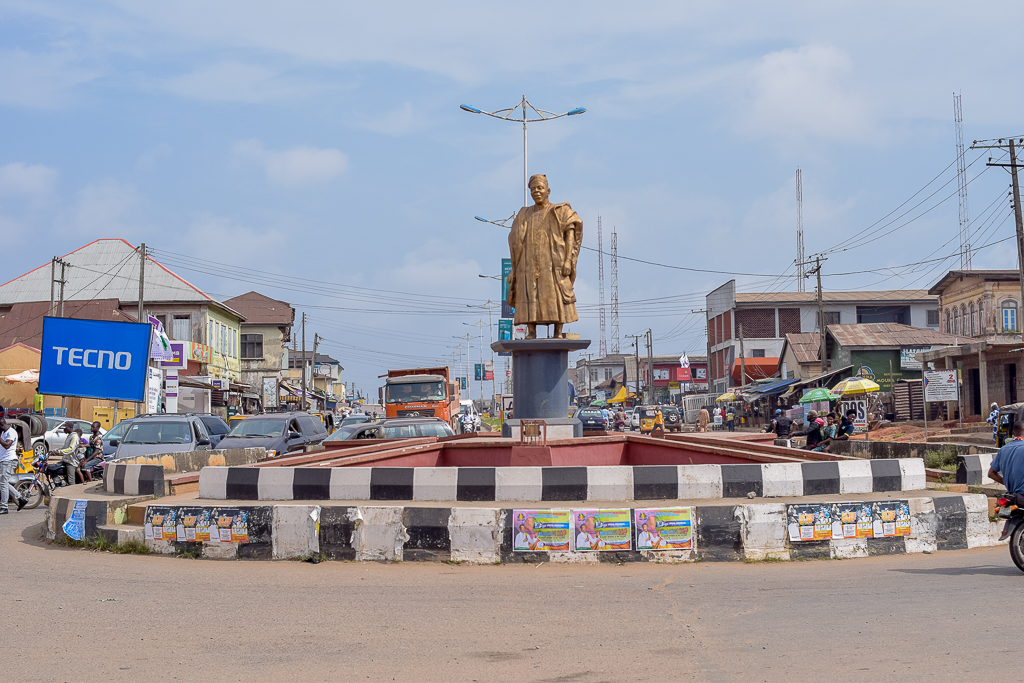

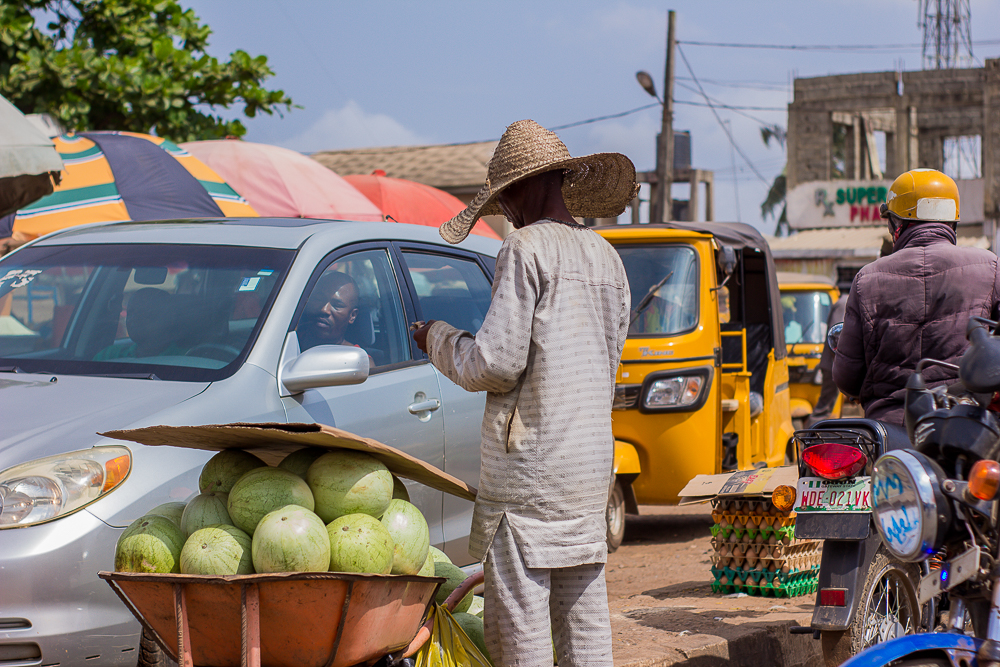

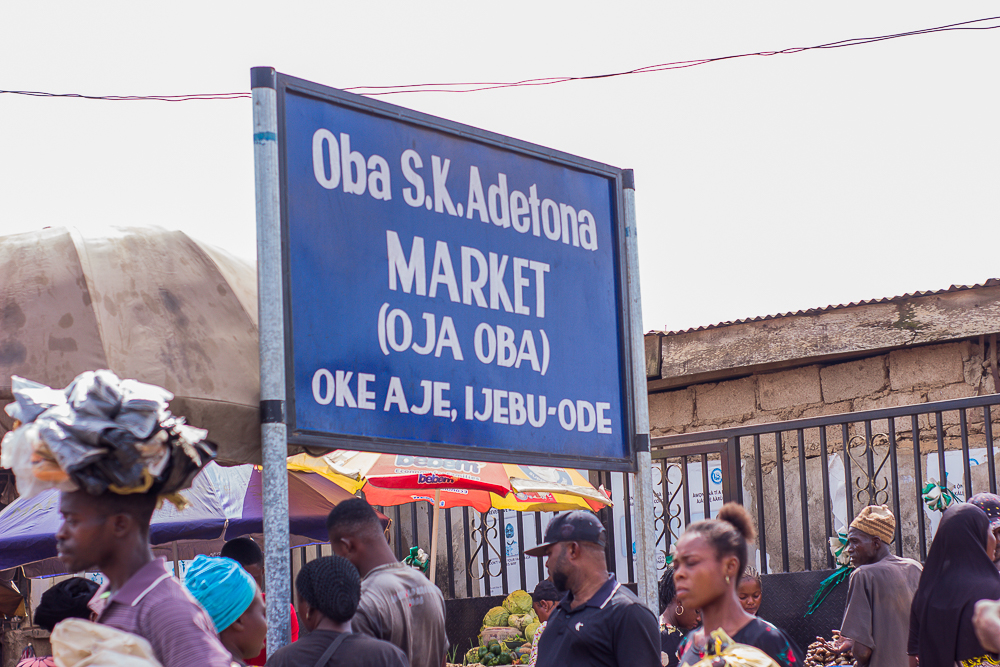

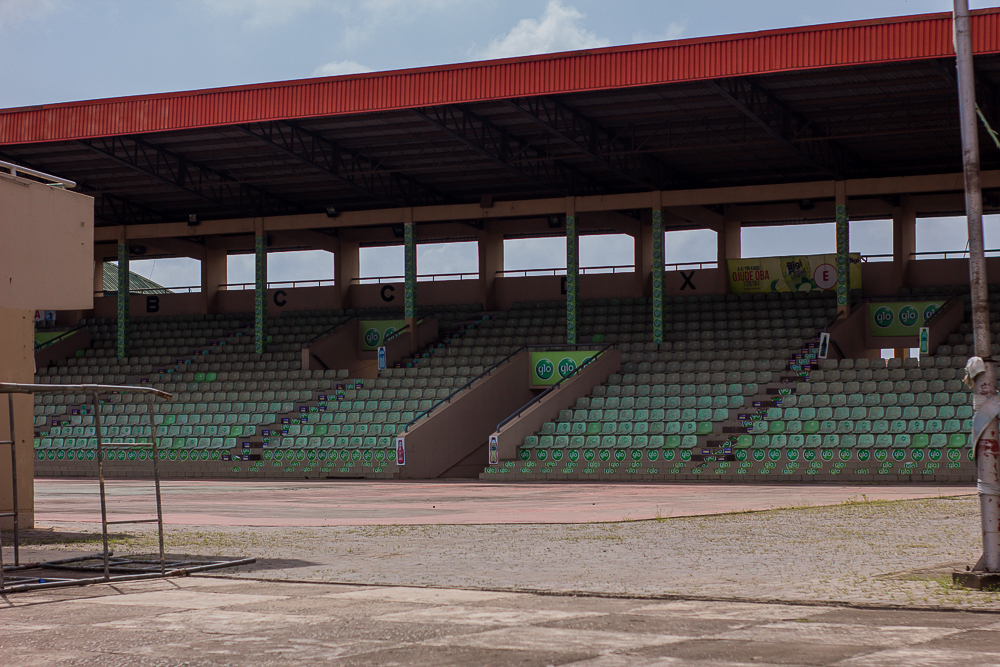

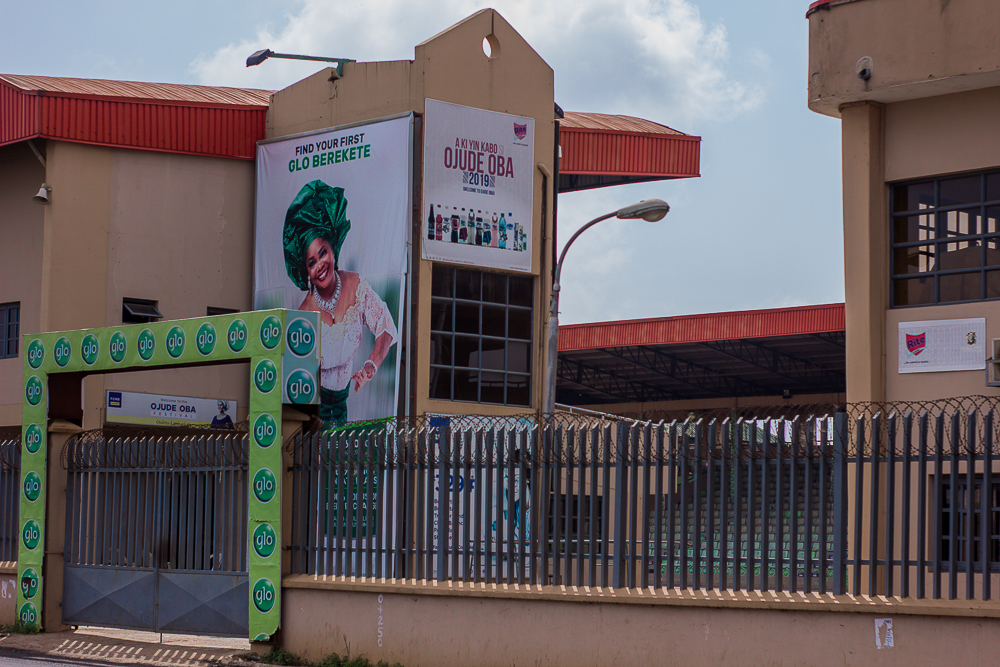

== See also ==
- Ikangba
- Sungbo's Eredo
