= List of Nigerian traditional states =

Nigerian kingdoms

There are many traditional states in Nigeria. A partial list follows. Although the traditional rulers no longer officially have political power, they still have considerable status in Nigeria and the power of patronage. Except where otherwise noted, names of traditional rulers are based on the World Statesmen.org list.

State	Region	Ethnic group	Capital	Present ruler	Accession date	Title	Notes
Abuja							Now the Suleja Emirate
Aboh Kingdom	South South	Igbo	Aboh	Dr Greg Nnamdi Oputa	2024	Obi	
Abureni Kingdom	Southsouth	Ogbia-Ijaw	Iduma	Collins Ebi Daniel	2008	Olila-Ebhugh	
Adamawa	North	Fulani	Yola	Muhammadu Barkindo Aliyu Musdafa	2010	Lamido	
Adara Chiefdom	Middle Belt	Adara	Kachia	Maiwada Galadima	2007	Agom Adara	
Ado-Odo	Southwest	Yoruba	Ado-Odo	Olusola Idris Osolo Otenibotemole II	2024	Olofin Adimula Oodua	Formerly Oba of Ado
Agaie	North	Nupe	Agaie	Yussuf Nuhu	2014	Etsu	
Agbor	South	Igbo	Agbor	Benjamin Ikechukwu Kiagborekuzi I	1979	Dein	
Anyama Clan	Southsouth	Ogbia-Ijaw	Anyama-Ogbia	King Theophilus Omie		Obanobhan	Anyama Clan also known as Anyama District made up of 17 communities
Anyama-Ogbia Kingdom	Southsouth	Ogbia-Ijaw	Anyama Town	Vacant (held by the House of Okori, in the Obih-Adih Royal Dynasty of Anyama-Ogbia)		Obenema	Anyama-Ogbia is the headquarters of Anyama Clan
Ake	Southwest	Yoruba	Abeokuta	Adedotun Aremu Gbadebo III	2005	Alake	Part of the confederation of Egbaland
Akure	Southwest	Yoruba	Akure	Aladetoyinbo Ogunlade Aladelusi	2015	Deji	
Akwa Akpa	Southeast	Ibibio	Calabar	Bassey Ekpo Bassey II	2008	Edidem	
Atyap Chiefdom	Middle Belt	Atyap	Zangon Kataf	Dominic Yahaya	2016	Agwatyap or Agwam Atyap	
Badagry	South West	Gunu/Yoruba	Badagry	De Wheno-Aholu-Menu-Toyi 1	1977	Oba Akran of Badagry	
Bade	North	Bade	Gashua	Abubakar Umar Suleiman	2005	Mai Bade	
Bajju Chiefdom	Middle Belt	Bajju	Zonkwa	Nuhu Bature	1995	Agwam Bajju	
Bashar State	North	Basharawa	Bashar	Adamu Idris	1963	Sarki	
Bauchi	North	Gera/Fulani	Bauchi	Rilwanu Adamu Jumba	2010	Emir	
Benin	South	Edo	Benin City	Ewuare II	2016	Oba	
Bichi	North	Hausa	Bichi	Nasiru Ado Bayero	2019	Emir	
Bida	North	Nupe	Bida	Yahaya Abubakar	2003	Etsu	
Biu	North	Bura	Biu	Mustapha Umar Mustapha II	2020	Emir	
Birnin Gwari	North	Gwari/Hausa	Birnin Gwari	Zubairu Jibrin Mai Gwari II	1993	Emir	
Bonny	South	Ijaw	Bonny	Edward Asimini William Dappa Pepple III, Perekunle IX	1996	Amanayanabo	Also called Okolo-Ama
Borgu	Middle Belt	Bariba	New Bussa	Muhammad Haliru Dantoro Kitoro IV	2015	Emir	Formed by merging Bussa and Kaiama
Borno	North	Kanuri	Maiduguri	Abubakar Ibn Umar Garbai El-Kanemi	2009	Shehu	
Brass	South-south	Ijaw	Brass, Nigeria	King Alfred Diete-Spiff		Amanayanabo	Once part of Nembe
Bussa							See Borgu
Bwari/Bwaya Kingdom	Middle belt	Gbagyi/Gwari	Bwari/Bwaya Kingdom	Ibrahim Yaro	2007	Esu	
Calabar (Old)							see Akwa Akpa
Calabar (New)							see Kalabari Kingdom
Damaturu	North	Kanuri	Damaturu	Hashimi II El-Kanemi		Emir	
Daura	North	Hausa/Fulani	Daura	Faruk Umar Faruk	2007	Emir	
Dikwa	North	Kanuri	Dikwa	Mohammed Masta II Ibn Alamin El-Kanemi	2010	Shehu	Divided into Bama and Dikwa Emirates in 2010
Ebira	Middle Belt	Igbirra	Koton Karifi	Shuaibu Mamman Lafiya	1970	Ohimegye	
Ebiraland	Middle Belt	Ebira	Okene	Ahmed Tijane Anaje	2024	Ohinoyi	
Edem	South East	Igbo	Edem	Nwabueze Annekwempaha Ezea II	July 2009	Eze Edem	The king's traditional salutation is Agaba-Idu. Formerly known as Christopher Nwabueze Ezea II, he took a regnal name on the anniversary of his decennial on the throne.
Edo							See Benin
Eko							see Lagos
Ekpeye Kingdom	Southsouth	Igbo	Ekpeye	Robinson Okpoluwon Robinson CON	1978	Eze Ekpeyelogbo	
Eri	Southeast	Igbo	Aguleri	Chukwuemeka Eri, Ezeora XXXIV	1976	Eze Eri	The Custodian of the Sacred Ovo Eri
Fantswam (Kafanchan) Chiefdom	Middle Belt	Atyap	Kafanchan	Josiah Kantiyok	2019	Agwam Fantswam	Renamed "Zikpak Chiefdom" by the Kaduna State governor, Nasir Elrufai
Fika	North	Bole	Potiskum	Muhammadu Abali Ibn Muhammadu Idrissa	2009	Moi	Distinct from the Potiskum Emirate, also based in Potiskum
Gobir	North	Hausa/Fulani	Sabon Birni			Sarkin	Originally a Hausa city-state, conquered by the Fulani in the 19th century
Gombe	North	Fulani	Gombe	Abubakar Shehu Abubakar	2014	Modibo	
Gujba Emirate	North	Kanuri	Gujba	Mai Muktar Ibn Ali Gangaram	2000	Emir	Formerly part of the Kanem Bornu Empire
Gumel	North	Hausa/Fulani and Kanuri	Gumel	Lawan Ahmed Muhammad Sani	2026	Emir	
Gusau	North	Hausa/Fulani	Gusau	Muhammadu Kabir Danbaba	1997	Emir or Sarkin Katsina	The rulers of Katsina and Maradi also use the title "Sarkin Katsina"
Gwandu	North	Hausa/Fulani	Gwandu	Muhammadu Iliyasu Bashar		Emir	
Hadejia	North	Hausa/Fulani	Hadejia	Adamu Abubakar Maje	2002	Emir	
Ham (Jaba) Chiefdom	Middle Belt	Ham	Kwoi	Jonathan Gyet Maude	1974	Kpop Ham	
Ibadan Kingdom	Southwest	Yoruba	Ibadan	Rasheed Ladoja	2025	Olubadan	
Idah							see Igala
Idoani	Southwest	Yoruba	Idoani	Olufemi Olutoye	2014	Alani	
Idoma Kingdom	Middle Belt	Idoma	Otukpo	Elias Ikoyi Obekpa Och'Idoma IV		Och'Idoma	
Igala	Middle Belt	Igala	Idah	Idakwo Ameh Oboni II	2012	Attah	
Igbomina Kingdom	Middle Belt	Yoruba	Omu-Aran	Abdulraheem Oladele Adeoti (Olomu Efon II)	1993	Olomu	Related to the Igbomina state in general
Ijebu Kingdom	Southwest	Yoruba	Ijebu Ode			Awujale	
Ijebu-Remo	Southwest	Yoruba	Sagamu	Babatunde Adewale Ajayi	2017	Akarigbo	See also Ijebu Kingdom, List of rulers of Remo
Ijesaland							see Ilesa
Ikale Kingdom	Southwest	Yoruba	Ikoya Ikale	George Faduyile, Adegun ll	1998	Abodi	Paramount Rulers of Ikale land Okitipupa, Irele and Odigbo local government
Ikateland Kingdom	Southwest	Yoruba	Lagos	Alayeluwa Saheed Ademola Elegushi, Kusenla II	27 April 2010	Oba	House of Kusenla
Ile Ife	Southwest	Yoruba	Ife	Adeyeye Enitan Ogunwusi Ojaja II	2015	Ooni	One of the two ranking Yoruba monarchs
Ilesa Kingdom	Southwest	Yoruba	Ilesa	Clement Adeyusi Haastrup	2024	Owa	
Ilorin	Middle Belt	Yoruba/Fulani	Ilorin	Ibrahim Sulu Gambari		Emir	
Ipokia Kingdom	Southwest	Yoruba	Ipokia	Raufu Oladeinde Adetunji Adeole Onigbaale III	1985	Onipokia	
Iroko Kingdom	Southwest	Yoruba	Iroko	Olasunkanmi Abioye Opeola, Kurunloju I	2011	Oniroko	
Isedo	Southwest	Yoruba	Ila Orangun	Oyedeji Ajide		Obalumo	Related to the Isedo Clan (with its own Obalumo) of the Igbomina state of Oke Ila Orangun
Isinkan	Southwest	Yoruba	Isinkan			Iralepo	
Itele	Southwest	Yoruba	Itele, Ijebu-East	Mufutau Adesanya Kasali Iboriaran I	2003	Moyegeso	See also Ijebu Kingdom, Jones Adenola Ogunde Adeyoruwa II reigned until 1996
Itsekiri							see Kingdom of Warri
Jajere Emirate	North	Fulani	Tarmuwa	Hamza Mai Buba Ibn Isa Mashio	2000	Emir, Mai, Lamido or Sarkin Jajere	divided into Jajere & Ngelzarma Emirates
Jama'are Emirate	North	Hausa/Fulani	Jama'are	Muhammadu Wabi IV dan Muhammadu Wabi	1975	Emir	
Jema'a Emirate	Middle Belt	Hausa/Fulani	Jema'a	Muhammadu dan Isa	1999	Emir	
Jos	Middle belt	Berom	Jos	Jacob Gyang Buba	2009	Gbong Gwom	
Jukun							see Wukari
Kagara Emirate; Kagoro	Middle Belt	Hausa/Fulani Atyap	Kagoro	Alhaji Ahmad Garba Gunna Attahiru II Ufuwai Bonet	2021 2008	Emir Agwam Agworok	A diarchy
Kaiama							Merged with Bussa into Borgu
Kalabari	Southsouth	Ijaw	Buguma			Amanyanabo	
Kano	North	Hausa/Fulani	Kano	Muhammadu Sanusi II	2024	Emir	
Karu Kingdom	Middle Belt	Gbagyi/Gwari	Karu	Luka Panya Baba	2004	Esu	
Katagum	North	Fulani/Kanuri	Katagum	Umar Muhammadu Kabir Umar	2017	Emir	
Katsina	North	Hausa/Fulani	Katsina	Abdulmumini Kabir Usman	2008	Emir or Sarkin Katsina	The rulers of Gusau and Maradi also use the title "Sarkin Katsina"
Kazaure	North	Hausa/Fulani	Kazaure	Najib Husaini Adamu		Emir	
Keana Chiefdom	Middle Belt	Agatu	Keana	Abdullahi Amegwa	2016	Osana of Keana	
Kebbi	North	Hausa/Fulani	Birnin Kebbi	Sama'ila Muhammad Mera	1996	Amir Argungu	
Keffi Emirate	Middle Belt	Hausa/Fulani	Keffi	Muhammadu Cindo Yamusa II		Emir	
Kontagora	Middle Belt	Hausa/Fulani	Kontagora	Muhammad Bara'u Mu'azu	2021	Sarkin Sudan	
Kumbwada	Niger State			Hajiya Haidzatu Ahmed	1998	Queen	
Kupa	Middle Belt	Kupa/Nupe	Abugi	Muhammadu Kabiru Isah II	1967	Maiyaki	
Lafia	North	Kanuri	Lafia	Sidi Bage	2019	Emir	Sarkin Lafia
Lafiagi Emirate	Middle Belt	Nupe	Lafiagi	Mohammed Kudu Kawu	2021	Etsu	Fulani jihad state founded 1824
Lagos	Southwest	Yoruba	Lagos	Rilwan Babatunde Osuolale Aremu Akiolu I	2003	Oba	Formerly known as Eko
Lapai	Middle Belt	Nupe	Lapai	Umaru Bago Tafida	2002	Etsu	
Lere	Middle Belt		Lere	Umaru Mohammed Sani		Emir	
Machina	North	Manga	Machina	Bashir Albishir Bukar		Emir	
Misau Emirate	North	Kanuri/Fulani	Misau	Ahmed Suleiman	2015	Emir	
Moroa	Middle Belt	Atyap	Manchok			Agwam Asholyio	
Mubi Emirate	Middle Belt		Mubi	Abu Bakar Isa Ahmadu		Emir	
Muri Taraba	Middle Belt	Hausa/Fulani	Muri Taraba	Abbas Tafida	1988	Emir	
Nasarawa Emirate	Middle Belt	Hausa/Fulani	Nasarawa	Ibrahim Usman Jibril	2018	Emir	
Nembe	Southsouth	Ijaw	Nembe	Edmund Maduabebe Daukoru, Mingi XII	2008	Amanyanabo	
Nembe Bassambiri	Southsouth	Ijaw	Bassambiri			Amanyanabo	
Ningi	North	Hausa/Fulani	Ningi	Yunusa Muhammad Danyaya	2024	Chief	
Nnewi	Southeast	Igbo	Nnewi	Kenneth Onyeneke Orizu III	1963	Igwe	
Nri	Southeast	Igbo	Agukwu	Enweleana II Obidiegwo Onyeso	1988	Eze Nri	Holder of the highest and most revered ofo in Igboland, the Ofo Nri-Menri.
Obioko Kingdom	Southeast		Obioko	Ekpo Eyo Abassi Eyo III	2008	Obong	
Ogbia Kingdom	Southsouth	Ogbia-Ijaw	Ogbia Town	Charles Dumaro Owaba, Obanobhan III	2017	Obanobhan	
Oke Ila Kingdom	Southwest	Yoruba	Oke Ila	Olufemi Oladapo Babalola		Obalumo	Related to the Igbomina state of Isedo
Oke-Ona Egba	Southwest	Yoruba	Abeokuta	Adedapo Adewale Tejuoso Karunwi III	1989	Oshile	Part of the confederation of Egbaland
Okolo-Ama							Otherwise known as Bonny since colonial times
Okpe	South-South	Urhobo	Orerokpe	Orhue I	2006	Orodje	
Okrika	Southeast		Okrika	Alfred Semenitari Abam Ado IX	2002	Amanyanabo	
Ondo	Southwest	Yoruba	Ondo	Adesimbo Victor Kiladejo	2006	Osemawe	
Onitsha	Southeast	Igbo	Onitsha	Nnaemeka Alfred Ugochukwu Achebe	2002	Obi	
Orlu	Southeast	Igbo	Orlu	Patrick II Acholonu	2009	Igwe XI, Duru IX	
Oshogbo	Southwest	Yoruba	Oshogbo	Jimoh Oyetunji Olanipekun	2010	Ataoja	
Owerri	Southeast	Igbo	Owerri	Emmanuel E. Njemanze	1989	Ozuruigbo	
Owo	Southwest	Yoruba	Owo	Oba Ajibade Gbadegesin Ogunoye III	2019	Olowo	
Owu	Southwest	Yoruba	Abeokuta	Olusanya Adegboyega Dosunmu II	2005	Olowu	Part of the confederation of Egbaland
Oyo	Southwest	Yoruba	Oyo	Abimbola Akeem Owoade	2025	Alaafin	One of the two ranking Yoruba monarchs
Pategi	Middle Belt	Nupe	Pategi	Umar Bologi II	2019	Etsu	
Potiskum	North	Ngizim	Potiskum	Umar Bubaram		Emir	Not to be confused with the Fika Emirate, based in the same town
Rano	North	Hausa/Fulani					
Sokoto	North	Hausa/Fulani	Sokoto	Sa'adu Abubakar	2006	Sultan	See also List of sultans of Sokoto
Suleja	Middle Belt	Hausa/Fulani	Suleja	Awwal Ibrahim	2000	Sarkin Zazzau	Formerly Abuja Emirate
Tiv	Middle belt	Tiv	Gboko	James Ayatse	2016	Tor Tiv	
Tula Chiefdom	Middle Belt	Tula	Kaltungo, Gombe	Abubakar Buba Atare II	2009	Mai	
Ubani							see Bonny
Ugbo-Igbo	Southeast	Igbo	Ugbo town	Godwin Ebem Udeonu	October 1978	Igwe	
Ugbo Kingdom	Southwest	Yoruba	Ilaje	Oba Fredrick Obateru Akinruntan	2009	Olugbo	
Ughelli Kingdom	Southsouth	Urhobo	Otovowodo	Ajuwe Oharisi III	1992	Ovie	
Uvwie	Southsouth	Urhobo	Effurun	Abe I	2008	Ovie	
Warri	Southsouth	Itsekiri	Ode-Itsekiri	Ogiame Atuwatse III	2021	Olu	Olu of Warri. See also kingdom of Warri 1478
Wase				Muhammadu Sambo Haruna	October 2010	Emir	Fulani Emirate
Wukari	Middle Belt	Jukun	Wukari	Manu Ishaku Ada Ali	28 January 2022	Aku Uka	
Yauri	North	Hausa/Fulani	Yauri	Muhammad Zayyanu		Sarkin	
Zamfara Emirate	North	Hausa/Fulani	Gusau	Muhammad Attahiru Ahmad		Sarkin	
Zaria							Alternate name for Zazzau Emirate
Zazzau	North	Hausa/Fulani	Zaria	Ahmed Nuhu Bamalli	2020	Sarkin	The ruler of the Suleja Emirate also uses the title "Sarkin Zazzau"

== See also ==
- Nigerian Chieftaincy
- Nigerian traditional rulers
