= Moyegeso of Itele =

Moyegeso is the Oba (King) of Itele in Ijebu, Ogun-State, Nigeria. The present Moyegeso of Itele is Oba Mufutau Adesanya Kasali Iboriaran I from the House of Ishagbola. He ascended the throne on March 3, 2003. His predecessor was Oba Jones Adenola Ogunde Adeyoruwa II from the House of Adeyoruwa. He reigned from 1981 to 1996. All those who have reigned as the Moyegeso of Itele were direct descendants of Awujale Oba Moyegeso (1710–1725), - Ojigi Amoyegeso - the 41st Awujale of Ijebuland. As such, any prince aspiring to become the Moyegeso of Itele must be able to trace his ancestry to Idewon quarters in Ijebu Ode where Awujale Oba Ojigi Amoyegeso hailed from. There are two ruling houses that can present princes as candidates for the royal stool on rotational basis. They are as follows:

- (i) Adeyoruwa Ruling House.
- (ii) Ishagbola Ruling House.

The former produced the immediate past Oba, while the latter produced the reigning one.

The descendants of Moyegeso are part of the House of Moyegeso in Idewon, one of the four ruling houses that are eligible to produce the Awujale of Ijebuland.

== The King's Court ==
Oba Moyegeso of Itele is supported in his court by traditional chiefs, notable among them are the Otunbas. They are drawn from all the quarters in Itele. In hierarchy, Otunba Wayoruwa from Agbodu Quarter is the second-in-command to the Moyegeso. However, he can not act as a regent in the absence or upon the demise of the Moyegeso. There is the Olootu of Itele, formerly known as Odele of Odole, who is the head of the kingmakers, but leadership of the Moyegeso Regency Council is reserved exclusively for the Otunba More of Odomore Quarter, as was the case from 1997 to 2001, when Otunba More acted as the regent of Itele Kingdom.

== Royal Seat ==
It is worthy to note that Odole Quarters is where the king's royal stool and his Palace are located. The palace of the incumbent Moyegeso is believed to be the biggest in the whole of Nigeria, built on 22 hectares of land in Ijebu-Itele.
