= Abdul-Lateef Adeniran Akanni =

Nigerian monarch (1958–2022)

Oba Abdul-Lateef Adeniran Akanni, Obaarun-Oladekan I
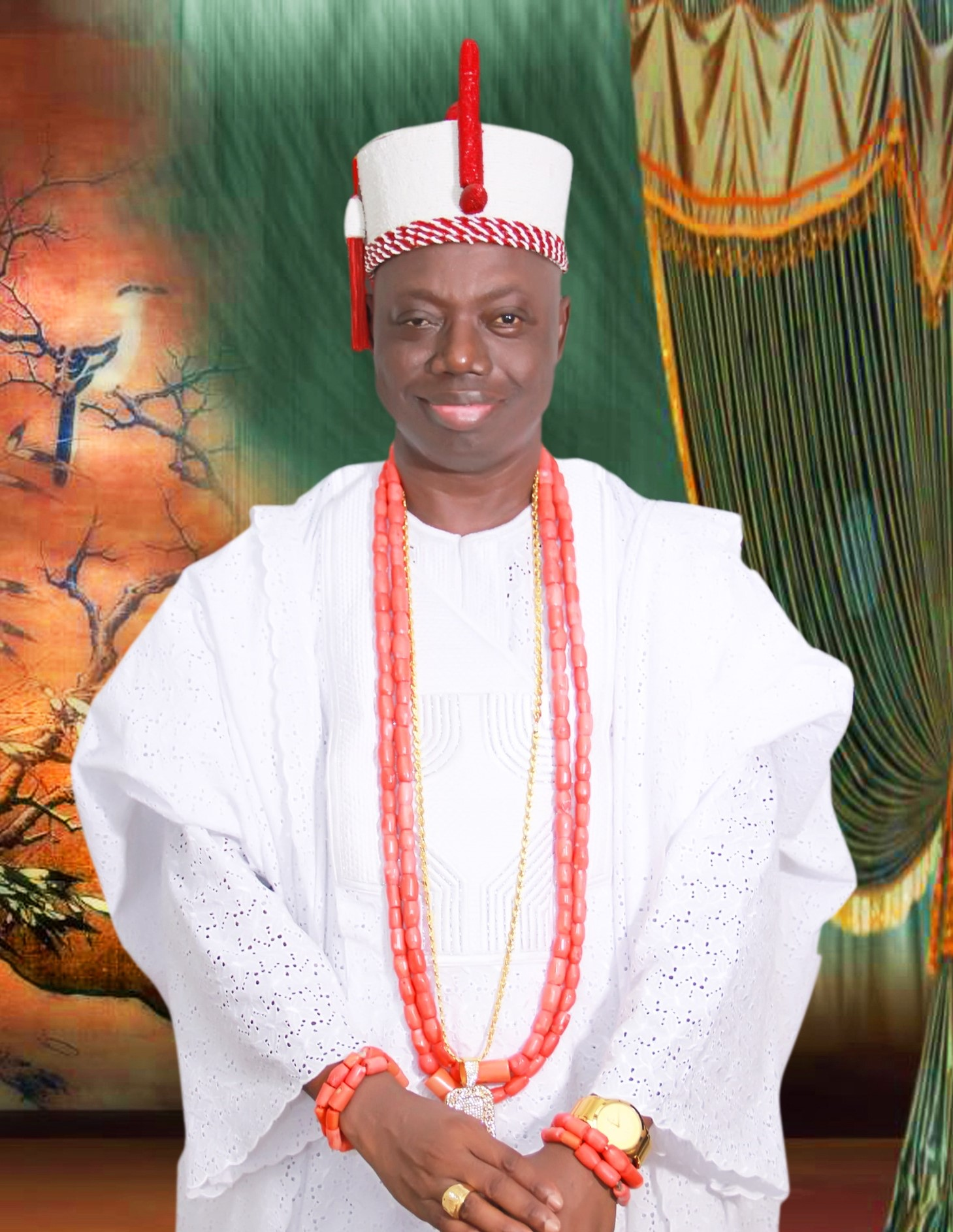
- Oba Akanni in 2021

Oba of Ado & Olofin Adimula Oodua of Ado-Odo
- Reign: 2 May 2009 – 7 January 2022
- Coronation: 2 May 2009
- Predecessor: Jacob Ogabi Akapo
- Successor: Olusola Idris Osolo Otenibotemole II
- Born: 3 December 1958; Ado-Odo, Federation of Nigeria
- Died: 7 January 2022 (aged 63)
- Spouse: See: Olori Adebisi Akanni, Olori Elizabeth Akanni
- Issue: Prince Gbadebo Akanni Prince Gbadero Akanni Princess Folashade Akanni Prince Adeleke Akanni
Names
- Abdul-Lateef Adeniran Akanni
Regnal name
- Oba Lateef Adeniran Akanni Obaarun-Oladekan I
- House: Aafin Olofin
- Father: Prince Ganiyu Bolaji Akanni
- Mother: Madam Adijatu Akanni

Oba Abdul-Lateef Adeniran Akanni, Obaarun-Oladekan I (3 December 1958 – 7 January 2022) was a Nigerian monarch. He was the Oba of Ado & Olofin Adimula Oodua of Ado-Odo and the traditional ruler of the Yoruba kingdom of Ado-Odo. He was installed as Oba of Ado & Olofin Adimula Oodua of Ado-Odo on 2 May 2009 holding the reignal name Ojikutujoye Obaarun Oladekan I, succeeding the deceased Oba J. O. Akapo, who died on 7 February 1989.

== Before Coronation ==
Oba J. O. Akapo died in 1989, and it was the turn of the House of Idobarun to produce the candidate to be installed as the Olofin. The selection process was delayed until 1993; Abdul-Lateef Adeniran Akanni was selected through due process. Another candidate from the maternal line of House of Idobarun who was eyeing the position caused an internal crisis which led the matter to the court of law. From the High Court to the Court of Appeal and finally to the apex court of the land, the Supreme Court of Nigeria. Finally, Abdul-Lateef Adeniran Akanni was pronounced as the Olofin elect on 12 January 2009 at the Supreme Court of Nigeria.

== Coronation ==
Abdul-Lateef Adeniran Akanni succeeded Olofin Agunloye Jacob Ogabi Akapo on 2 May 2009, during the regime of Otunba Gbenga Daniel as the Executive Governor of Ogun State after twenty years that the stool has been vacant.

== Personal life ==
He was married to two wives, Olori Fausat Adebisi Akanni, his senior wife, and Elizabeth Akanni.

Additionally, he was recognized as a sports enthusiast, particularly in football, where he served as a respected and impartial referee in both Ado-Odo and Badagry. Prior to becoming the Olofin, he worked as a teacher, carrying on the legacy of his forefathers.

== Death ==
The Olofin, ruler of Ado-Odo, died at the age of 63 on January 7, 2022, at the Federal Medical Center Abeokuta, located in Ogun State. His demise followed a brief illness. He had served as the Olofin for 12 years and 4 months. The news of his death spread through major Nigerian news networks on the morning of his passing. His remains were promptly returned to Ado-Odo for final rites, and he was laid to rest in accordance with Islamic traditions at his family house.
