= Idoani Confederacy =

Idoani Confederation Idoani
- Traditional state
- Location in Nigeria
- Coordinates: 7°17′0″N 5°52′0″E
- Country: Nigeria
- State: Ondo State

Government
  - Alani: Olufemi Olutoye I

The Idoani Confederacy or Ido-ani confederation was a traditional state based in the town of Idoani in the Ose Local Government Area of Ondo State, Nigeria. The origins of the state date back to 1880 in the Kiriji/Ekiti Parapo war theatre at the height of the Yoruba Civil Wars when six separate villages/communities around the Ose river came together for the purpose of mutual protection from powerful warlords like Aduloju of Ado Ekiti and Ogedengbe of Ilesha encroaching and raiding the area while uprooting Ibadan hegemonic influences.

== Early years ==
The present confederacy, which dates to 1880, includes six eastern Yoruba communes: Ido, Amusigbo, Isure, Iyayu, Isewa and Ako. Some of these communities operated as a Diarchy, having two concurrent rulers in the past. The communities that formed the confederacy had suffered heavily during the 19th century Yoruba wars, with many people migrating to other areas like Owo and Ado and other locations. Idoani had been a well fortified base of Ibadan power in the Akoko country and so, it was besieged in 1978 by the Parapo forces. Facing the combined forces of the Ijesha and Ekiti, in 1879 they were forced to ask for help from Ibadan, and formed the confederacy the next year.

British missionaries introduced Christianity in the late 19th century, along with new farming methods, and Idoani became part of the Lagos colony, later the protectorate of Nigeria. The communities were merged in 1921. The first confederate traditional ruler was appointed after the death of Alani Adesunloye Atewogboye on 3 January 1921. Falade I ruled as Alani from 1921 to 1958, and was succeeded by Akingboye Falade II on his death.

== Disputed succession ==
In the early 1970s, Akingboye Falade II died and a temporary regent was installed by the traditional authorities, who ended up ruling for 14 years due to a dispute between the chiefs and the government over the succession process. The military government then installed an Alani of their choice in the traditional ruler's palace, who was accepted by some but not all of the chiefs.

When the civilian Bamidele Olumilua became governor (1992–1993) he imposed traditional law, and Oba Aderemi Atewogboye was elected. However, the usurper remained in the palace, and the town was divided between the two. After the return to military rule, the Administrator of Ondo State from August 1996 to August 1998, Anthony Onyearugbulem, presented the staff of office to the rival Alani of Idoani, a person said by some to have no royal blood.

== Recent times ==
With the return to civilian government in 1999, Aderemi Atewogboye was recognized as the ruler. He continues to perform duties such as intervening in family disputes or cases of violence against women. In April 2009 he led a delegation of several hundred people from the Ose community to protest against delays in ratifying that area's designate for a commissioner in the state government. In 2009 Atewogboye called on the government to improve the roads, which had suffered years of neglect and were impassable at some times of the year. Oba Atewogboye died in 2010, his daughter Princess Adetutu Atweogboye served as regent from 2010 to 2016. Oba General Olufemi Olutoye was crowned after the regency.
