= Olasunkanmi =

- Gender: Unisex
- Language(s): Yoruba

Origin
- Word/name: Nigeria
- Meaning: It's my turn to be wealthy.

listen

Olasunkanmi is both a masculine given name and surname meaning It's my turn to be wealthy. Notable people with the name include:

== Given name ==
- Olasunkanmi Abioye Opeola, Kurunloju I (born 1961), Nigerian ruler
- Olasunkanmi Adeniyi (born 1997), Nigerian-born American football player
- Olasunkanmi Akande Ajide (born 1985), Nigerian footballer
- Olasunkanmi Rehanat Alonge (born 1987), Nigerian singer and songwriter

== Surname ==
- Akinlabi Olasunkanmi (born 1956), Nigerian businessman and politician
- Musefiu Olasunkanmi Ashiru (born 1944), Nigerian footballer
- Sulaimon Olasunkanmi Yussuf (born 1960), Nigerian politician
