= Tagwai Sambo =

A̠gwam Tagwai Sambo (OFR)
- His Royal Highness

Monarch of Asholyio (Moroa) Chiefdom
- In office: 1966 – 2024
- Elective Monarchy: 1966
- Predecessor: Mallam Kazah Boman
- Successor: Chief Isiaku Tagwai Sambo
- Born: 24 December 1936; Tsok (Manchok), Northern Region, Colony and Protectorate of Nigeria
- Died: 14 June 2024 (aged 87); Manchok, Kaduna State, Nigeria
- Burial: Moro’a Palace
- Spouse: Alisabatu Kognet Akai Sambo
- Issue: 3
Names
- English: Tagwai Sambo
- Mother: Attah Sambo
- Religion: Christianity
- Occupation: Chief of Moro’a

Tagwai Sambo (24 December 1936 – 14 June 2024) was the monarch of Asholyio (Moroa) Chiefdom with headquarters at Manchok, a Nigerian traditional state in southern Kaduna State, Nigeria. He is also known by the title "Chief of Moro'a (Asholyio)".

== Life and Death ==
Sambo was born in Tsok (Manchok), Northern Region, British Nigeria (now Manchok, southern Kaduna State, Nigeria) on 24 December 1936. Tagwai Sambo died on 14 June 2024 in Manchok, Kaduna State, Nigeria, at the age of 87. He was reported to have been one of Nigeria’s longest-serving traditional rulers, having served as the Agwam Asholyio (traditional ruler of the Asholyio/Moro’a people) for about 58 years. His death was followed by tributes from government officials, traditional institutions, and community members who recognized his role in traditional leadership and public service.

== Kingship ==
Sambo was appointed Chief of Moroa and Member of the Jema’a Native Authority and also became a member, Northern House of Chiefs (later known as Kaduna State Council of Chiefs) in 1966.

On the crises in the Southern Kaduna area, HRH Sambo in December 2016 said he hoped the Kaduna State governor would make a speech about the events if call for calm and dialogue in anticipation for peace.

Sambo became the founding chancellor of the Kaduna State University (KASU) when it was established and remained so from 1 January 2005 until 11 March 2020 when the state governor, Nasir Elrufai, appointed the deposed Emir of Kano, Muhammadu Sanusi II, to replace him as the school's Chancellor just a week after his banishment from Kano.

== Role in Kaduna State University ==
Tagwai Sambo served as the pioneer Chancellor of Kaduna State University (KASU). He was appointed to the position in 2005 when the university was established. As Chancellor, he served as the ceremonial head of the university and represented the institution in official academic and administrative activities.

Sambo remained the Chancellor of Kaduna State University until March 2020, when he was succeeded by Muhammadu Sanusi II, the former Emir of Kano. The Kaduna State Government described his years of service as part of his contribution to the development of the university and higher education in Kaduna State.
