= Gwio Kura =

Coordinates: 12°40′N 11°04′E

Gwio Kura is a town in north-east Yobe State, Nigeria, administered by the Bade Local Government. It is located about 50 kilometres south of the border with Niger.
