= Idoani =

Idoani Ido Alani
- city
- Location in Nigeria
- Coordinates: 7°17′56″N 5°50′48″E
- Country: Nigeria
- State: Ondo State
- LGA: Ọsẹ

Government
  - Type: Township
  - Alani: Oba Olufemi Olutoye
- Elevation: 1,080 ft (330 m)

Idoani is a small town situated in the Ose Local Government area of Ondo State, Nigeria where the Federal Government College, Idoani, is located. The people are Yorubas belonging to the Ào group of eastern Yorubaland alongside other towns like Ifira, Ipesi, Imeri, Ikun, Idogun, Afo and Idosale. It was the seat of the historic Idoani Confederacy, a Nigerian traditional state.

== Geography ==
Idoani is located in the northern portion of the Ose local government area of Ondo state, around 30km northeast of Owo and 27km southeast of Ikare Akoko. The major preoccupation of the people of Idoani and the surrounding area is agriculture. The town is situated at an elevation of 330 meters and is located in a region characterized by its hilly landscape as is typical of the general/wider Akoko region. Quite a number of people still ride their bicycles to farm (a growing culture in the western world today).

== History ==
Idoani comprises six major historic quarters which were originally and hitherto independent villages that out of necessity had to join forces during the Yoruba Wars of the 19th century to form the Idoani Confederacy. These communities (quarters) are; Ido (Oke ido), Isure, Isewa, Amusigbo, Iyayu, and Ako. There is also Ido isale (Owani) a few kilometres away. These different quarters are contiguous with the exception of Idosale and intermarriage between them is the norm. Idoani town as it exists today came into existence in 1921. Before then, the six communities were situated some distance away from one another until they agreed to resettle at a central point known as Oja Igbamo. The Alani and some people then moved north from Owani (Ido Isale) situated some 4.4kms south to this central point and set up their settlement named 'Oke Ido', while others decided to stay back at the village of Idosale.

The people of Idoani all speak Yoruba dialects, while those in the Iyayu quarter speak both Yoruba and Iyayu. The differences between the six quarters is noticeable in their speech. Iyayu has been described as being non-Yoruba, while those of the five other quarters all belong to the Amusigbo group of Ao within the eastern dialects of the Yoruba linguistic grouping. Historically, the six quarters (Ido, Isure, Ako, Isewa, Amusigbo, Iyayu) are said to be of different historical backgrounds. The Iyayu quarter for example migrated into Idoani from Sosan Akoko, the people of the Ako quarter migrated from Owake in Iwaro-Oka Akoko, while the people of Isure migrated directly from Ife, and were later augumented by populations from Ijan Ekiti. According to prominent Benin historian Jacob Egharevba, in the 15th century during the reign of Ozolua, the communities around the present Idoani area were vassalized, by the emerging Kingdom of Benin. Ozolua subsequently fathered the prince who became the Alani of Owani village who was accepted into the community by the local king of Isewa village, the Asewa. The royal house of Idoani is known as the Obasunloye house, and comprises three ruling families or cadet branches, viz; Owusi, Sadibo, and Ologbosere lineages.

== Culture ==
Idoani shares cultural affinities with other Yoruba communities. Before the colonial period, the people believed in the supreme being, Olodumare and Orishas (deities) such as Ogun and Aje. Such beliefs still persist today, although with much lesser number of adherents. The Ogboni played their societal roles as a part legislative body as in the other Yoruba kingdoms, while Age grade groups with their gerontocratic leadership structures headed by the Iharẹs (elders) play other general societal roles like the upkeep of the town and other functions.

== The Idoani Confederacy ==
In 1880 at the height of Yoruba Wars that engulfed the entire region of Yorubaland and had major impacts in Idoani, the six communities of the area came together and formed the Idoani Confederacy to resist Ekiti and Ijesha expeditions and inroads into the Osse river valley and areas further east under the military command of Ogedengbe their war general. In 1879 they were forced to ask Ibadan for help, and formed the confederacy the following year. Some decades later in 1921, all six members of the confederal arrangement were merged by colonial authorities into a single community with a single recognized ruler after the death of Oba Adesunloye Ateewogboye on the 3rd of January that year. Before then, all the constituent quarters/communities had their own kingship arrangements.

== Recent times ==
As in other communities of Yorubaland, the influence of colonization in Idoani is significant. There are Anglican, Christ Apostolic Church, Methodist and Roman Catholic churches in Idoani. The two notable high schools are: Federal Government College, Idoani and Irekari Grammar school. There are now some private primary and secondary schools. The people still speak their local dialects and languages, there are no major fast food outlet in the town, like those found in the major cities in Nigeria. The people eat Yoruba traditional meals such as "Iyan" (pounded yam) with egusi or any of the vegetable soup and "Agidi"/igidi, made from maize flour (the two types are: Agidi afurere and Tepotiyo).

Idoani is a peaceful destination in Nigeria, there is an important annual masquerade festival, around August, during which a lot of its indigenes return home from all over the world. Notable masquerade like the 'Jejeliki' is known for great dancing, while the 'Igwetzan' or 'Alémọsóko' masquerade of the Iyayu quarter is known for general entertainment and 'tormenting' stubborn children with canes (or whips). Other prominent masquerades include; Egunle, Ela, Eruerue, Aloro and Okeripe of the Isure quarters.

== Gallery ==
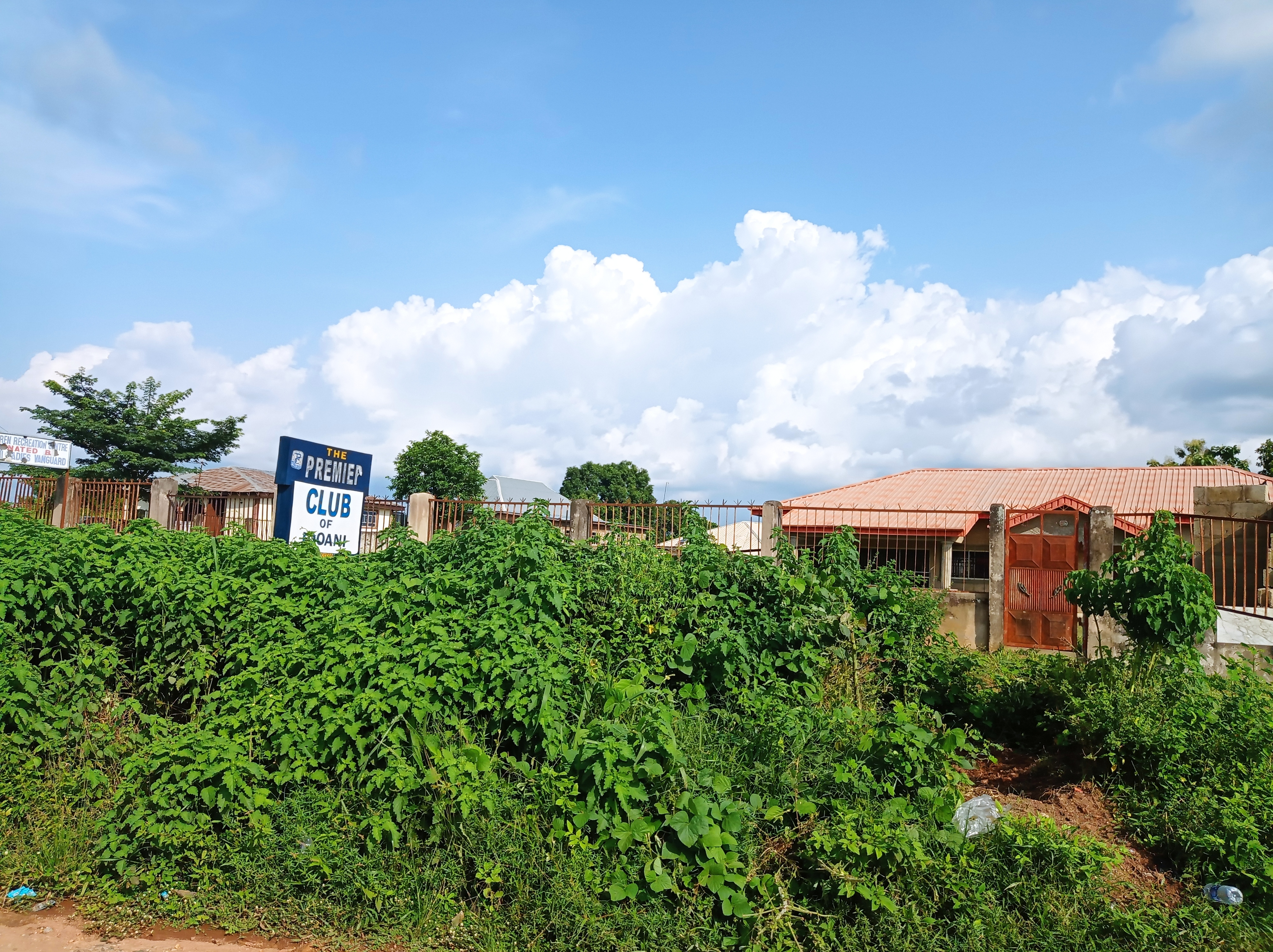
The Premier Club, Idoani, Ondo State

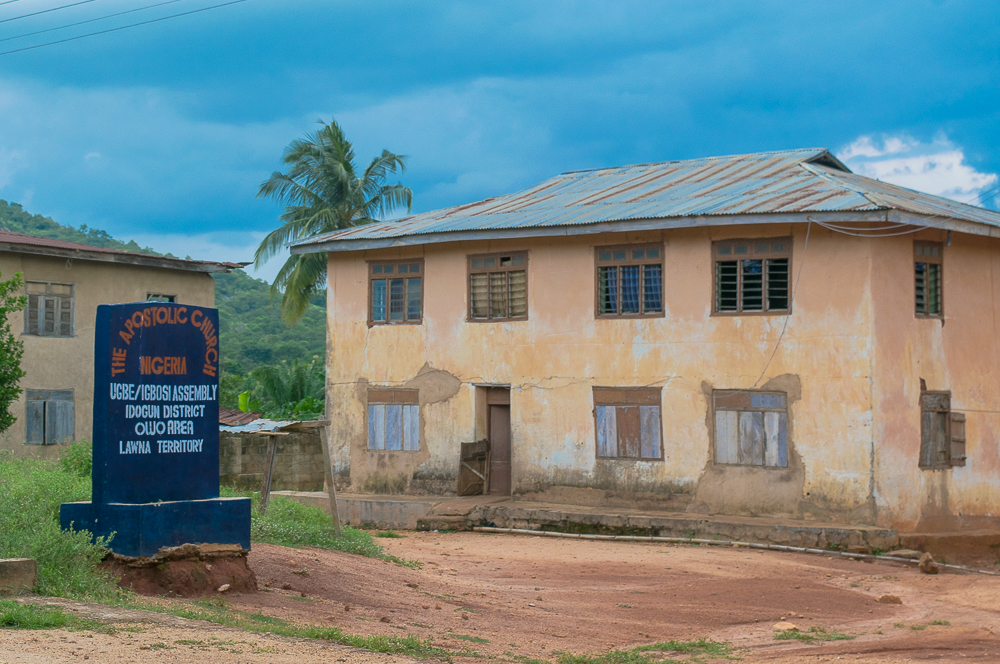
The Apostolic Church, Idogun District, Idogun

== See also ==
- Federal Government College, Idoani
- Holy Trinity Anglican Church, Idoani

== Bibliography ==
- Idoani (2008). "Idoani: One community, many tongues". thenationonlineng.net. Archived from the original on 3 May 2012.
