= Gerald Mbamalu =

- Eze Ojoto III, Ezeoranyelu I
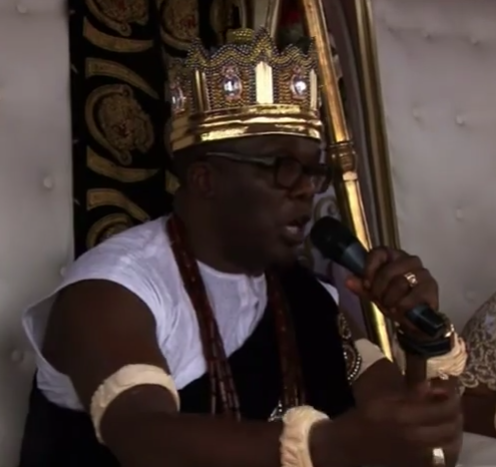
- King Gerald Mbamalu.

Igwe Augustine Obidigwe (Eze Ojoto II
- Coronation: 1 April 2018

Gerald Mbamalu. // is the traditional ruler of Ojoto in Idemili-South Local Government Area of Anambra State, in Nigeria.

== Early life ==
He is the fourth child of Aloysius and Philomina Mbamalu. Mbamalu was crowned on April 1, 2018, as Eze Ojoto III and Ezeoranyelu I by the community alongside his Igwe-in-Council. He succeeded the late Igwe Augustine Obidiwe (Eze Ojoto II).

An official certificate of recognition was issued in accordance with the Traditional Rulers Act of 1981 by then Governor of Anambra State, Willie Obiano, on February 20, 2018. His first Ofalla was recorded on January 2, 2021 and New Yam festival on August 5, 2021.

== Previous ojotos ==
- Igwe Abel E. Adirika was crowned as Ezebube I of Ojoto (19th Century)
- HRH Igwe Augustine Obidiwe was crowned as Azeakajiofoana
- Igwe Gerald Mbamalu was crowned as Eze Ojoto III and Ezeoranyelu I (2018–present).

== See also ==
- Obi of Onitsha
- Oba of Benin
- Olofin Adimula Oodua
- Igwe Kenneth Onyeneke Orizu III
