= Ogedegbe =

Ògèdègbé
- Gender: Male
- Language: Yoruba

Origin
- Origin: Nigerian
- Meaning: The nickname of a famous Ìjẹ̀shà warrior, originated from his unique fighting style
- Region of origin: South West, Nigeria

Ògèdègbé audio (also spelled Ògèdèǹgbé) is a Nigerian surname. It is a male name and of Yoruba origin, which means "The nickname of a famous Ìjẹ̀shà warrior, originated from his unique fighting style". The name Ògèdègbé signifies strength and respect and is common among the Ìjẹ̀ṣà people of Southwest Nigeria.

Notable people with the name include:

- Best Ogedegbe (1954–2009), Nigerian footballer
- Gbenga Ogedegbe, Nigerian American physician
- Tayo Ogedengbe, British basketball player

== See also ==
- Ogedengbe of Ilesa, Yoruba chief
- Oliver Ogedengbe Macaulay, Nigerian politician
