= Damaturu Emirate =

- Traditional state
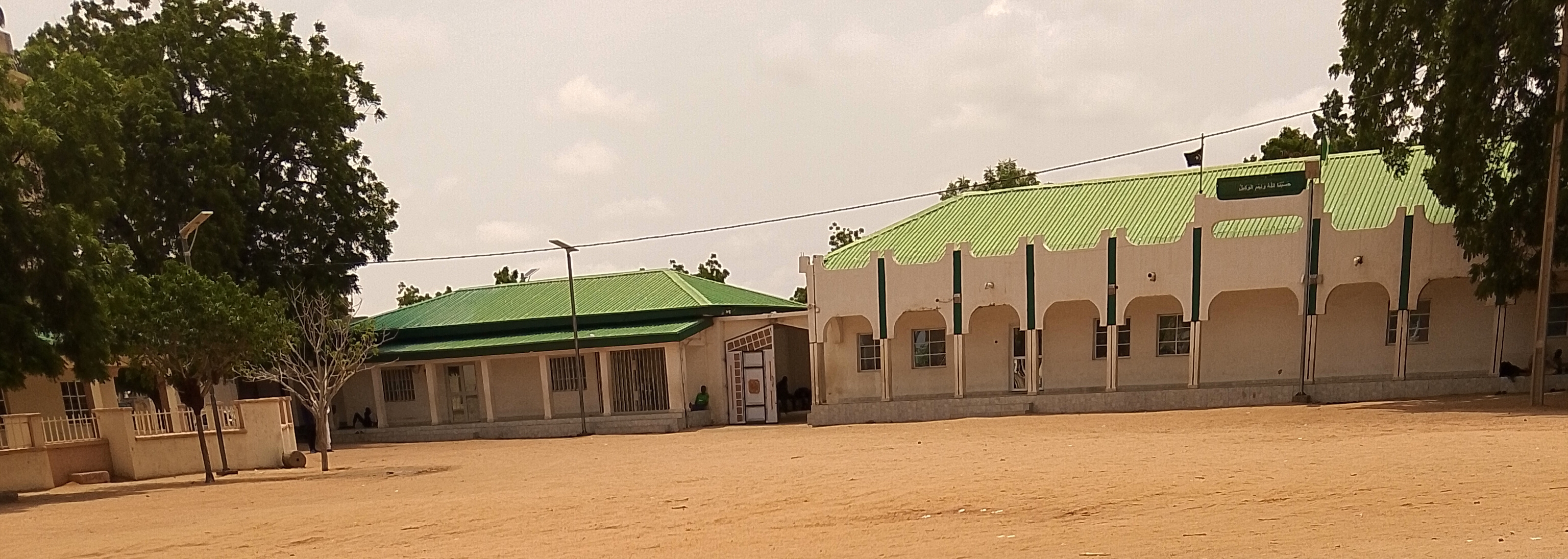
- Emir Palace Damaturu

- Location in Nigeria
- Coordinates: 11°44′40″N 11°57′40″E
- Country: Nigeria
- State: Yobe State

The Damaturu Emirate is a Nigerian traditional state based in Damaturu, the capital of Yobe State, Nigeria. It is a first-class emirate.

At one time the Damaturu Emirate was part of the Ngazaragamo emirate, which is based in Gaidam and extended as far as Chad to the east and Niger to the north.

In November 2003 the Yobe State Governor, Bukar Ibrahim, approved the appointment of Baba Shehu Hashimi II Ibn Umar El-Kanemi as Shehu (Emir) of Damaturu. Hashimi II El-Kanemi was appointed Emir of Damaturu on 15 May 2004. He succeeded his brother Alhaji Bukar Ibn Elkanemi, who had died in Mecca the previous year.

Hashimi Ibn El-Kanemi earned a Diploma in Accounting and Auditing in 1988 from Ramat Polytechnic, Maiduguri, and an advanced diploma from Tafawa Balewa University, Bauchi in 2002. He worked as cashier with an agro company in Damaturu from 1983-1987, then worked for Damaturu Local Government as an accountant. After Yobe State was created 1991, he transferred to the state government and by 1996 was Director of Finance and Supply in the Governor's Office. In 2000 his brother appointed him District Head of Damaturu.
