= Hallmark University, Ijebu-Itele =

Nigerian university

Hallmark University
- Location: Ijebu-Itele, Ogun State, Nigeria; 6°58′19″N 4°02′53″E
- Campus: Urban
- Location within Nigeria

Hallmark University is situated in Ijebu-Itele, Ogun State, Nigeria.

== History ==
The University was established by the Vivian Fowler Trust Foundation in 2015 and is approved by the Federal Government of Nigeria.

Hallmark University commenced its academic activities on 1st March, 2016 with students admitted into its Faculties of Natural and Applied Sciences and Management and Social Sciences.

== Academics ==
Hallmark University offers undergraduate programs in various fields, including Accounting, Business Administration, Computer Science, Mathematics, Biochemistry, Microbiology, Mass communication, International relations and more.

== Facilities ==
Hallmark University has facilities that support teaching, research, and learning. These include classrooms, laboratories, a library, and a hostel for students. The university also has a range of extra-curricular activities.

== Partnerships ==
Hallmark University has established partnerships with local and international institutions to facilitate research and collaboration.

== Accreditation ==
Hallmark University is accredited by the National Universities Commission, which is the government agency responsible for overseeing the accreditation of universities in Nigeria.

The Accounting department of the University is also accredited by the Institute of Chartered Accountants of Nigeria (ICAN).
