= Moroa =

Moroa Marwa, Moro'a
- Chiefdom and Village
- Location within Nigeria
- Coordinates: 09°44′N 08°24′E
- Country: Nigeria
- State: Kaduna State
- LGA: Kaura
- Chiefdom: Asholyio (Moroa)

Government
  - Type: Elective Monarchy
  - Chief of Moroa (Agwam Asholyio): Agwam Tagwai Sambo (OFR)
- Time zone: UTC+01:00 (WAT)
- Climate: Aw

Moroa (also spelt Moro'a and Marwa; Tyap: Sholyia̱) is a Chiefdom of the Asholyio people and a village in Kaura Local Government Area of southern Kaduna state in the Middle Belt region of Nigeria.
