= Jones Adenola Ogunde =

Oba Jones Adenola Ogunde Adeyoruwa II
- Moyegeso of Itele
- Reign: 1981-1996
- Predecessor: Idowu Aderibigbe
- Successor: Oba Mufutau Adesanya Kasali Iboriaran I

Oba Jones Adenola Ogunde JP was born on 23 April 1930 to the family of Prince Jacob Adefuye Ogunde and Alice Tanimowo Ogunde. He attended Saint John's Anglican Primary School, Ijebu-Itele for his elementary studies in the late 1930s. He then proceeded to Ijebu Ode for further studies and apprenticeship. Afterwards, he left Ijebu for Lagos where he established a printing press business.

Prior to his appointment as the Moyegeso of Itele, he was a successful businessman owning a printing press company called Nigerian Service Printers in Surulere, Lagos. He had also served as the treasurer on the board of the Itele Community Development Association at a point during his youth days. The Itele community witnessed some development during his reign. For example, it was during his reign that the Moyegeso of Itele became a coronet and gained elevation to the status of a part II Oba by the Ogun State government of Nigeria. He was also a Justice of the Peace until his demise.

He was crowned as Oba Moyegeso on May 20, 1985, three years after he was appointed in 1981. His regnal name was Adeyoruwa II. The Moyegeso Adeyoruwa I was his great-grandfather. He was the father of the Gospel singer and songwriter, Ade Jones.
