= Olusola Idris Osolo =

Oba of Ado & Olofin Adimula Oodua of Ado-Odo

Otenibotemole II
- Olofin Adimula Oodua
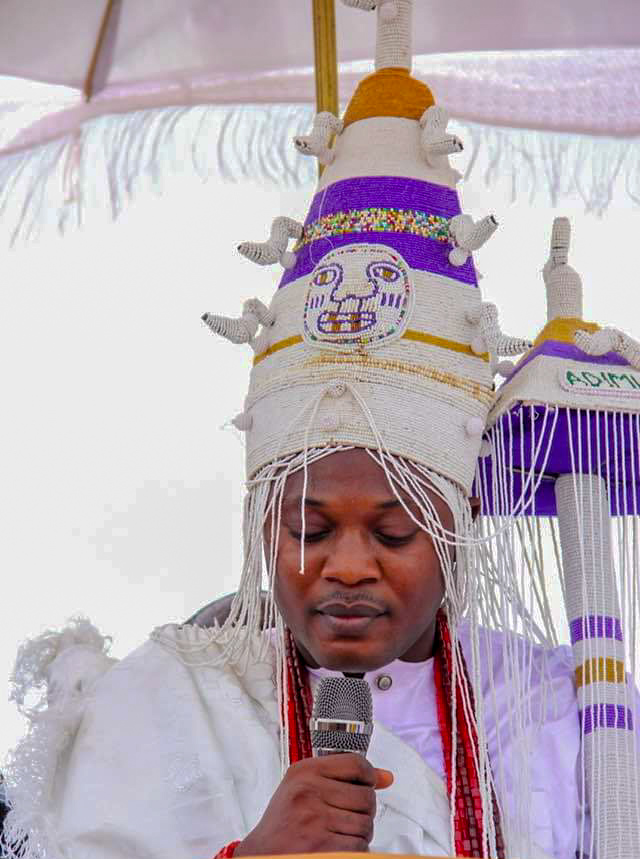
- Otenibotemole II in 2024

Oba of Ado & Olofin Adimula Oodua of Ado-Odo
- Reign: 9 February 2024 – present
- Coronation: 30 March 2024
- Predecessor: Abdul-Lateef Adeniran Akanni Ojikutujoye I
- Born: Olusola Idris Adebowale; 27 August 1988 (age 38); Ado-Odo, Western State, Nigeria (now in Ogun State, Nigeria)
- Spouse: Taheebat Omotolani Osolo
- Issue: 3
Names
- Olusola Idris Adebowale Lamidi Osolo
- House: Okewaye Ruling House

Olusola Idris Osolo (Otenibotemole II) (born August 27, 1988) is the 41st Oba of Ado and Olofin Adimula Oodua of Ado-Odo. He ascended to the throne on 9 February 2024, succeeding Abdul-Lateef Adeniran Akanni Ojikutujoye I who was the 40th Olofin Adimula Oodua of Ado-Odo.

== Ancestry ==
Ọba Otenibotemole II was born in to the Osolo family of the Okewaye Ruling House, one of the four ruling house in Ado-Odo. His father, Musiliu Olatunji Lamidi, served as an Assistant Commissioner of Police until his death in April 1998 and was descended from Oba Asade Awope Otenibotemole. His mother, Alhaja Azeezat Omolola Lamidi (Nee Agbogunlori) holds the positions of Otun Iyaloja and Otun Iya Adinni of Ado-Odo.

== Selection and coronation ==
In a bid to determine the rightful heir to the position of Olofin Adimula Oodua, Olofin Olusola Osolo was nominated among other 14 indigenes from the Okewaye ruling house of Ado-Odo who were also heirs to the throne. The Ogun State Commissioner for Local Government and Chieftaincy Affairs, in conjunction with the Ado-Odo/Ota Local Government, orchestrated an election on Friday, February 9, 2024 The election was conducted in accordance with legal provisions, aimed at ensuring a fair and transparent process. He gained the majority of votes cast. He received his oath of office on March 30, 2024.

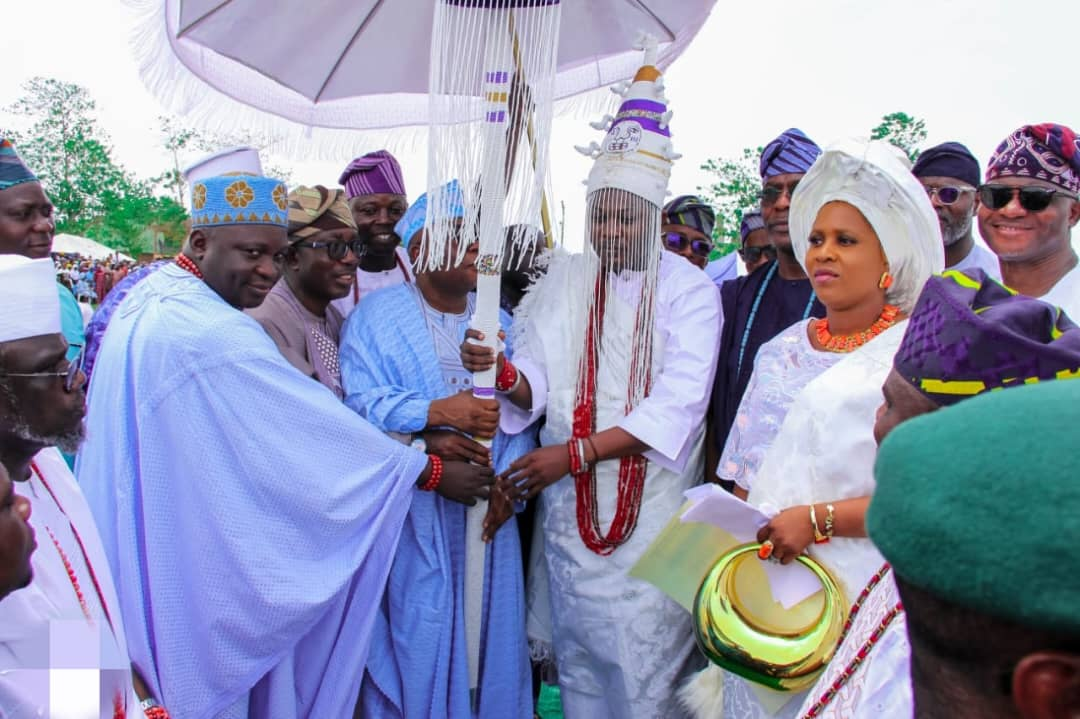
The Ogun State Commissioner for Local Government and Chieftaincy Affairs presenting staff of office to Ọba Olusola as the Oba of Ado

== Personal life ==
He is married to Olori Taheebat Omotolani Osolo, and they have three children. He is recognized as a sports enthusiast, with a particular passion for youth development. He participated at the Ileya football novelty match, tagged "Ado Odo Legends," organized by the youths of Ado Odo in 2023 at the football pitch.
