= Gbenga Ogedegbe =

Nigerian American physician

- Born: Lagos
- Education: Hussey College Warri; Donetsk National Medical University; Montefiore Medical Center
- Scientific career
- Workplaces: New York University; Columbia University Vagelos College of Physicians and Surgeons; NYU Langone Medical Center

Gbenga Ogedegbe is a Nigerian American physician who is a Professor of Population Health & Medicine at New York University. He serves as Chief of the Division of Health & Behavior and Director of the Center for Healthful Behavior Change in the Department of Population Health at the School of Medicine. His research considers health disparities and evidence-based interventions to improve the health outcomes of minority populations.

== Early life and education ==
Ogedegbe was born in Lagos. He attended Hussey College Warri. He decided that he wanted to be a physician at the age of eight. After finishing high school, he studied medicine at Donetsk National Medical University in Ukraine. Soon after completing his medical degree he moved to the United States, where he was a medical resident at Montefiore Medical Center. He later joined Columbia University, where he completed a Master's degree in public health. He held research fellowships in both the Weill Cornell Medicine college and Albert Einstein College of Medicine.

== Research and career ==
Ogedegbe investigates health disparities and the dissemination and implementation of evidence-based medical interventions. He launched his independent career at the Columbia University Vagelos College of Physicians and Surgeons and moved to the NYU Langone Medical Center in 2008. Since 2012 he has served as Director of the Center for Healthful Behavior Change in NYU Langone's Department of Population Health. In New York City, Ogedegbe led a programme that trained community health workers to support Black communities suffering from hypertension. The health workers provided advice and guidance to faith communities in New York, in which they managed to significantly reduce and manage hypertension. The programme, which involved Therapeutic Lifestyle Changes, was known as FAITH (Faith-Based Approaches in the Treatment of Hypertension). Alongside FAITH, Ogedegbe ran The Barbershop Connection, a programme that identified men who hadn't had colonoscopies and guided them to screenings and follow-up care. He showed that African-American men who were partnered with these patient-navigators were twice as likely to be screened and had a six-point reduction in their blood pressure. Beyond the obvious health benefits, FAITH and the Barbershop Connection creased jobs for local residents.

Alongside FAITH, Ogedegbe created CaRT (the Cardiovascular Research Training Institute), which brings together United States and European researchers in Ghana and Nigeria to train young scientists and increase the number of African healthcare workers. Sub-Saharan Africa accounts for one quarter of the global disease burden, but only 14% of the global health workforce. Ogedegbe has led National Institutes of Health-funded initiatives to eliminate cardiovascular disease in sub-Saharan Africa. Alongside his work on cardiovascular diseases, Ogedegbe runs the National Institutes of Health Stroke Disparities Solutions center.

During the COVID-19 pandemic, Ogedegbe investigated disparities in outcome and disease severity of minority communities who suffered from coronavirus disease. Through an analysis of over 11,000 patients, Ogedegbe found that Black and Hispanic patients were not inherently more susceptible to the disease. In an interview with The New York Times, Ogedegbe explained, "It is all about the exposure. It is all about where people live. It has nothing to do with genes."

== Awards and honors ==
- Agency for Healthcare Research and Quality John M. Eisenberg Excellence in Mentorship Award
- Jonathan E. Fanton Leadership in Education award
- Daniel D. Savage Memorial Science Award
- Elected Fellow of the National Academy of Medicine

== Selected publications ==
- Go Alan S.; Mozaffarian Dariush; Roger Véronique L.; Benjamin Emelia J.; Berry Jarett D.; Blaha Michael J.; Dai Shifan; Ford Earl S.; Fox Caroline S.; Franco Sheila; Fullerton Heather J. (2014-01-21). "Executive Summary: Heart Disease and Stroke Statistics—2014 Update". Circulation. 129 (3): 399–410. doi:10.1161/01.cir.0000442015.53336.12. PMID 24446411.
- Bellg, Albert J.; Borrelli, Belinda; Resnick, Barbara; Hecht, Jacki; Minicucci, Daryl Sharp; Ory, Marcia; Ogedegbe, Gbenga; Orwig, Denise; Ernst, Denise; Czajkowski, Susan (2004). "Enhancing Treatment Fidelity in Health Behavior Change Studies: Best Practices and Recommendations From the NIH Behavior Change Consortium". Health Psychology. 23 (5): 443–451. doi:10.1037/0278-6133.23.5.443. ISSN 1930-7810. PMID 15367063.
- Pickering Thomas G.; Miller Nancy Houston; Ogedegbe Gbenga; Krakoff Lawrence R.; Artinian Nancy T.; Goff David (2008-07-01). "Call to Action on Use and Reimbursement for Home Blood Pressure Monitoring". Hypertension. 52 (1): 10–29. doi:10.1161/HYPERTENSIONAHA.107.189010. PMC 2989415. PMID 18497370.
