= Abubakar Umar Suleiman =

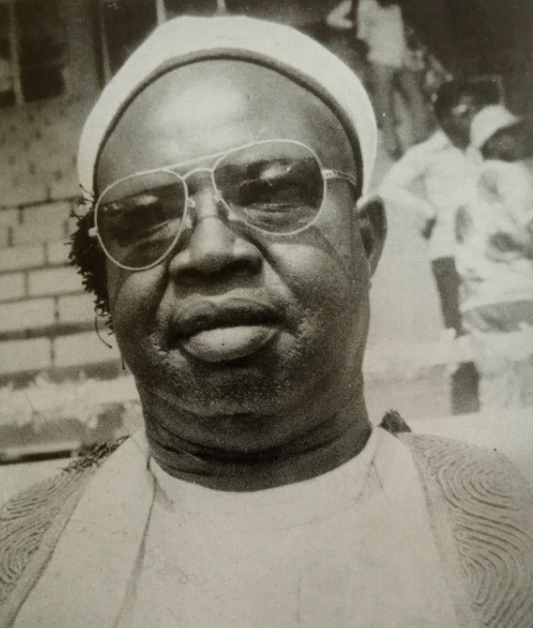

Abubakar Umar Suleiman (born January 1962) was turbaned as the 11th Emir of Bade (Mai Bede) on 12 November 2005. He is head of the traditional state of Bade with headquarters in Gashua, Yobe State, Nigeria.

== Biography ==
Abubakar was born in January 1962 in Gashua of the Bedde dynasty. He attended Borno college of basic studies (1980 - 1981) and then proceeded to Ahmadu Bello University, Zaria (1981 - 1983) where he earned a Diploma in Insurance. Later he studied at the University of Maiduguri, which he gained an advanced Diploma in public Administration in 2002.

Abubakar started work at Africa Bank Nigeria in 1984, moving to Premier Commercial Bank in 1989 and then to Yobe State Saving and Loans bank (1994 to 1995). He was appointed Chief accountant of the Governor’s office in Damaturu (1995 - 1996), then Director of Finance and Supply (1996 - 2005). On 12 November 2005 he was appointed Mai of Bade by Yobe State Governor Bukar Abba Ibrahim after the death of his uncle, Mai Saleh. He became Deputy Chairman of the Yobe state council of chiefs. Abubakar has been active in promoting immunization against Polio in the state, working with the World Health Organization to help overcome fears that the vaccine is dangerous.
