= Kontagora Emirate =

- Traditional state
- Flag

- Location within Nigeria
- Coordinates: 10°24′N 5°28′E
- Country: Nigeria
- State: Niger State

Government
  - Type: Emirate Council
  - Emir: Saidu Namaska

The Kontagora Emirate is a traditional state with the capital city of Kontagora, Niger State, Nigeria. The Kontagora Emirate is among the major emirates in Niger state like Kagara Emirate, Suleja Emirate and others

== History ==
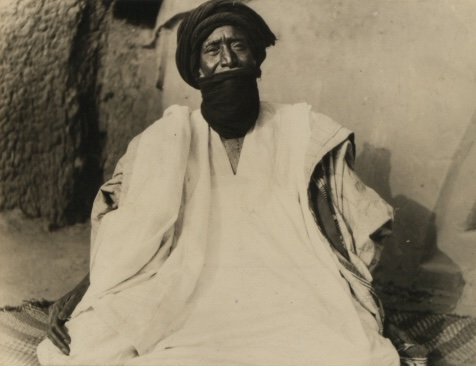
Ibrahim Nagwamatse during his exile

Kontagora is made up of territory originally divided between various minor chiefdoms (Aguarra, Dakka-Karri, Kambari, Dukawa, and Ngaski) which were conquered by the Fula people between 1858 and 1864, and turned into the emirate of Kontagora, a dependency of the Sokoto Caliphate.

Following a well-armed attack, starting on 31 January 1901, the emirate fell under British rule, becoming a province first in the British Protectorate of Northern Nigeria and then in the British colony of Nigeria, until independence in 1960.

Kontagora now consists of Kontagora emirates, containing the chiefdom of Wushishi, the territories of Sarkin Bauchi, and the chiefdom of Kagara, all administratively grouped into the Mariga, Magama, and Rafi Local Governments.

== List of rulers ==
Names and dates taken from John Stewart's African States and Rulers (1989).

Sarakunan Sudan of the Kontagora Emirate
No.	Name	Reign start	Reign end
1	Umaru Nagwamatse	1864	1876
2	Abubakar Modibbo	1876	1880
3	Ibrahim Nagwamatse	1880	1901
–	not recognized	1901	April 1903
3	Ibrahim Nagwamatse	April 1903	26 October 1929
4	Umaru Maidubu	26 October 1929	February 1961
5	Mu'azu	February 1961	1976
6	Alhaji Sa'idu Namaska	1976	7 September 2021
7	Muhammad Bara'u Mu'azu II	7 October 2021	to date
