= Saidu Namaska =

- Sarkin Sudan
- Reign: 1974–2021
- Coronation: 15 January 1974
- Predecessor: Umaru Sarkin Kudu
- Successor: Alhaji Muhammad Barau Mu’azu II
- Born: Saidu Umaru; December 31, 1937; Old Kontogora Emigrate, Northern Nigeria
- Died: 9 September 2021 (aged 83); Abuja, Nigeria
- Spouse: Sa'a Namaska
Names
- Saidu Umaru Nagwamatse Maska
- House: Nagwamatse
- Religion: Islam
- Occupation: Judge and Traditional ruler

Alhaji Saidu Umaru Namaska Dan Malam (December 31, 1937 – September 9, 2021) was a Nigerian traditional ruler of the Kontagora Emirate with the title Sarkin Sudan. His father Umaru Sarkin Kudu was the son of Mallam Umaru Nagwamatse, the founder of the Kontagora Emirate and a prince from Sokoto. He died on September 9, 2021, from a brief illness in National Hospital Abuja.

== Biography ==
Saidu Namaska started his education at Bida Middle School and obtained a BSc degree at Ahmadu Bello University. He began his career as an officer in the Nigeria Police Force in 1961, and rose to become a judicial president of North-Western State before his retirement.

In January 1974, he was turbaned Sarkin Sudan (king of blacks) of the Kontagora Emirate and as the sixth emir of Kontagora.

During an election campaign visit by governor of Niger State, Dr Muazu Babangida Aliyu, Saidu Namaska complained of having only well water for the household needs of his palace having been using it for the past 36 years in the palace.
