= Iroko, Oyo State =

Iroko
- Town
- Motto: PACE SETTER
- Location in Nigeria
- Coordinates: 7°49′25″N 3°57′00″E
- Country: Nigeria
- State: Oyo State

Government
  - Local Government Chairman of Akinyele: Hon. Ope Salami
  - Oniroko of Iroko: Oba Olasunkanmi Abioye Opeola, Kurunloju I
- Time zone: UTC+1 (WAT)
- Area code: 200140

Iroko is one of the major towns in Akinyele Local Government Area in Oyo State, Nigeria.

On 30 May 2025, Olasunkanmi Abioye Opeola, Kurunloju I, who had been the town's Oniroko or ruler, died.
