= Therapeutic Lifestyle Changes =

Diet and lifestyle for lowering cholesterol

Therapeutic Lifestyle Changes, also known as the TLC Diet, is a dietary pattern recommended by the National Cholesterol Education Program, part of the National Institutes of Health, to control hypercholesterolemia. This pattern focuses on saturated fats and cholesterol, dietary options to enhance LDL cholesterol lowering, weight control, and physical activity.

== Background/History ==
High cholesterol is one of the major controllable risk factors for coronary heart disease, heart attack and stroke. The National Institutes of Health created the National Cholesterol Education Program in 1985 to reduce cardiovascular disease rates in the United States by addressing high cholesterol. They created the TLC diet to be used alone or in conjunction with medication management to control elevated cholesterol. The diet was incorporated into the Adult Treatment Panel III (ATP III) for high cholesterol in adults which was released in 2002. Updated guidelines for cholesterol management were established in 2013 by the American Heart Association (AHA) and American College of Cardiology (ACC).

== Diet Components ==
Essential Components of Therapeutic Lifestyle Changes

The main Therapeutic Lifestyle Changes components include:

- Less than 7 percent of your daily calories from saturated fat
- Less than 200 mg a day of cholesterol
- 25–35 percent of daily calories from total fat
- Weight reduction if overweight with only enough calories to reach or maintain a healthy weight
- At least 30 minutes of a moderate intensity physical activity, such as brisk walking, on most, and preferably all, days of the week.

After six weeks, The National Cholesterol Education Program recommends checking the LDL cholesterol response to the changes; if the LDL cholesterol goal has not been achieved, other therapeutic options for LDL lowering can be implemented. These include: 2 grams per day of plant stanols or sterols and 10–25 grams per day of soluble fiber.

Macronutrient Distribution of the TLC Diet

The Therapeutic Lifestyle Changes macronutrient profile includes:

- Total fat: 25–35% of total calories
- Saturated fat: Less than 7% of total calories
- Polyunsaturated fat: Up to 10% of total calories
- Monounsaturated fat: Up to 20% of total calories
- Carbohydrate: 50–60% of total calories
- Dietary fiber: 20–30 grams per day
- Protein: Approximately 15% of total calories
- Cholesterol: Less than 200 mg/day

== Research Findings ==
The recommendations for cholesterol management through lifestyle changes from the National Cholesterol Education Program have evolved over time based on data from epidemiological observations, animal studies, and clinical trials. Animal models have demonstrated a direct relationship between LDL cholesterol and atherosclerosis. Animals consuming diets high in saturated fat and cholesterol develop LDL cholesterol elevation and atherosclerosis. Epidemiologic evidence in humans supports this direct relationship between LDL cholesterol and coronary heart disease risk.

One randomized crossover study completed at Tufts University and New England Medical Center looked at the Therapeutic Lifestyle Change diet relative to a typical Western diet. Thirty-six participants with moderately elevated cholesterol levels participated in two 32-day phases where the subjects consumed their normal dietary patterns or the experimental diet consistent with the NCEP recommendations. This diet provided 30% calories from fat, 7% calories from saturated fat, and 75 mg cholesterol per 1,000 calories. Relative to the Western diet, the TLC diet resulted in 11% lower LDL cholesterol.

Additional studies have looked at the benefits of plant stanols and sterols on lowering LDL cholesterol. One randomized, placebo-controlled, crossover trial assessed the lipid-altering efficacy of a softgel capsule providing esterified plan stanols/sterols in 28 subjects with primary hypercholesterolemia. Participants followed the TLC diet for 5 weeks followed by 6 weeks of either the sterol/stanol capsule or a placebo before crossing over to the other product for 6 weeks while continuing the TLC diet. Results indicated that incorporating sterols/stanols into the TLC diet produced positive changes in LDL cholesterol by 9.2%, total cholesterol by 7.4%, and triglycerides by 9.1%. A following study replicated this original study design, supporting the efficacy of 1.8 grams/day of esterified plant sterols/stanols in adjunct with the TLC diet to reduce lipid levels in participants with hypercholesterolemia.
