= Manchok =

Manchok Tsok
- Town and chiefdom headquarters
- Manchok
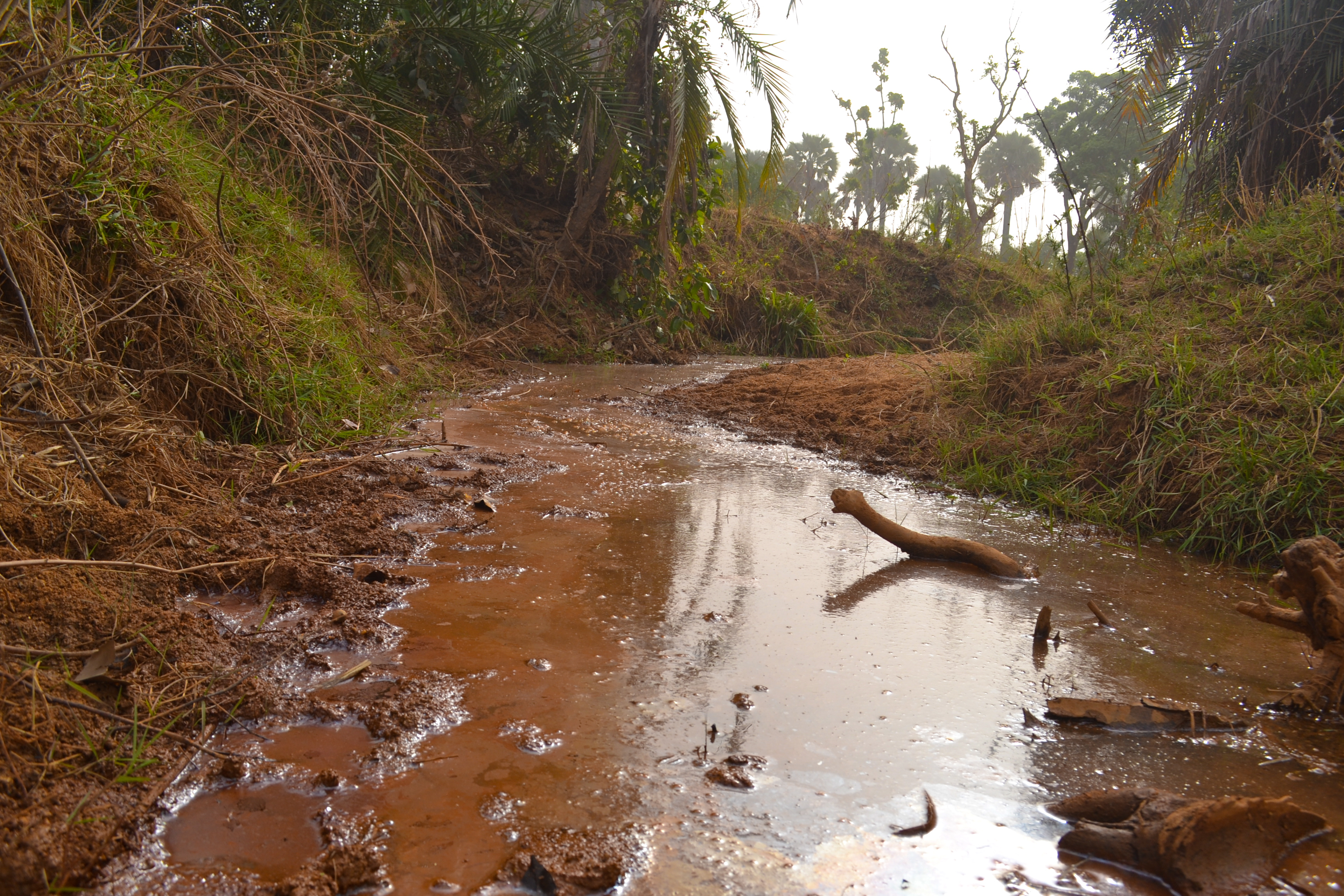
- An oily stream in Zankan

- Location within Nigeria
- Coordinates: 09°41′N 08°30′E
- Country: Nigeria
- State: Kaduna State
- LGA: Kaura
- Chiefdom: Āsholiō

Government
  - Type: Elective Monarchy
  - Agwam Asholio: HRH Dr. Tagwai Sambo (OFR)
- Elevation: 896 m (2,940 ft)
- Time zone: UTC+01:00 (WAT)
- Climate: Aw

Manchok (Tyap: Tsok) is a town in Kaura Local Government Area as well as the Asholyio (Moroa) Chiefdom headquarters, in southern Kaduna state in the Middle Belt region of Nigeria. The people of the town speak Sholyio, one of the language varieties in the Tyap cluster. The town has a post office.

== Geography ==
=== Landscape ===
The elevation of Manchok is 896 metres (2,940 feet).

=== Climate ===
Manchok has an average annual temperature of about 24.8 °C (76.6 °F), average yearly high of 28.6 °C (83.5 °F) and low of 18.8 °C (65.8 °F), with zero rainfalls at the ends and beginnings of the year with a yearly average precipitation of 28.1 mm (1.11 in), and an average humidity of 53.7%, similar to that of neighbouring towns Kagoro, Zonkwa and Zangon Kataf.

Climate data for Manchok (896 m [2,940 ft] altitude)
Month	Jan	Feb	Mar	Apr	May	Jun	Jul	Aug	Sep	Oct	Nov	Dec	Year
Record high °C (°F)	31 (88)	33 (91)	34 (93)	34 (93)	31 (88)	29 (84)	26 (79)	25 (77)	27 (81)	29 (84)	30 (86)	29 (84)	29.8 (85.6)
Mean daily maximum °C (°F)	29 (84)	32 (90)	34 (93)	33 (91)	30 (86)	27 (81)	24 (75)	22 (72)	24 (75)	28 (82)	29 (84)	31 (88)	28.6 (83.5)
Daily mean °C (°F)	24 (75)	26 (79)	29 (84)	29 (84)	26 (79)	24 (75)	21 (70)	20 (68)	22 (72)	25 (77)	25 (77)	26 (79)	24.8 (76.6)
Mean daily minimum °C (°F)	15 (59)	17 (63)	21 (70)	22 (72)	20 (68)	19 (66)	18 (64)	17 (63)	18 (64)	20 (68)	19 (66)	19 (66)	18.8 (65.8)
Record low °C (°F)	14 (57)	16 (61)	20 (68)	21 (70)	21 (70)	20 (68)	19 (66)	18 (64)	19 (66)	19 (66)	18 (64)	15 (59)	18.3 (64.9)
Average precipitation mm (inches)	0 (0)	1 (0.0)	3.1 (0.12)	13.5 (0.53)	35.5 (1.40)	54.2 (2.13)	71.2 (2.80)	69 (2.7)	60.3 (2.37)	29.3 (1.15)	0.1 (0.00)	0 (0)	28.1 (1.11)
Average precipitation days	0	1	4	12	23	28	31	30	29	18	0	0	14.7
Average relative humidity (%)	24	18	28	48	66	80	88	90	86	61	32	23	53.7
Source: World Weather Online

== People and language ==
=== People ===
The people of Manchok and surrounding areas are the A̠sholyio (also spelt Asholio, Asholyia, Osholio; also called "Morwa" or "Moro'a" by the Hausa). The town is the headquarters of the chiefdom bearing their name.

=== Language ===
The Asholyio speak Sholyio, one of the dialects of the Tyap language group, alongside six others - Fantswam, Gworok, Takad, Tyap proper, Tyeca̠rak and Tyuku. Jju also seems to be a part of these dialects.

=== Counting in Sholyio ===
1. A̱nyiung
2. A̱fiyang
3. A̱tat
4. A̱naai
5. A̱fwuon
6. A̱tee
7. A̱natat
8. A̱ri̱nai
9. A̱kubunyiung
10. Swak
11. Swak ma̱ng a̱nyiung
12. Swak ma̱ng a̱fiyang
13. Swak ma̱ng a̱tat
14. Swak ma̱ng a̱naai
15. Swak ma̱ng a̱fwuon
16. Swak ma̱ng a̱tee
17. Swak ma̱ng a̱natat
18. Swak ma̱ng a̱ri̱nai
19. Swak ma̱ng a̱kubunyiung
20. Nswak nfiyang

== Politics ==
Manchok (or Tsok) is one of the districts and the headquarters of the Sholyio (or Sholio) chiefdom. Other districts are Azankan (Zankan), Azagwai (Gizagwai), Gbandang (Bondong), Vak (Kajim).

== Notable people ==
- Arc. Barnabas Bala Bantex, architect, politician
- Maj. Gen. Joshua Madaki (rtd.), military service
- Agwam Tagwai Sambo (OFR) paramount ruler

== See also ==
- List of villages in Kaduna State
