= Ijebu East =

- LGA
- Interactive map of Ijebu East
- Location in Nigeria
- Coordinates: 6°44′N 4°10′E
- Country: Nigeria
- State: Ogun State
- Headquarter: Ogbere

Government
  - Local Government Chairman: Dr. Oluwadare Kehinde (APC)

Area
  - Total: 2,234 km^{2} (863 sq mi)

Population (2006 census)
  - Total: 110,196
  - Density: 49.33/km^{2} (127.8/sq mi)
- Time zone: UTC+1 (WAT)
- 3-digit postal code prefix: 120
- ISO 3166 code: NG.OG.IE

Ijebu East is a Local Government Area in Ogun State, Nigeria. Its headquarters are in the town of Ogbere on the A121 highwayat6°44′N 4°10′E.

Ijebu East is the largest LGA by area in Ogun State, with an area of 2,234 km^{2} and a population of 110,196 at the 2006 census. Some of the major towns in the LGA include Ijebu Itele, Ijebu Ife, Imobi, Ijebu Imushin and Ogbere where the LGA's secretariat is located.

The postal code of the area is 120.
