= Bade Emirate =

- Traditional state
- Location within Nigeria
- Coordinates: 12°52′5″N 11°2′47″E
- Country: Nigeria
- State: Yobe State

The Bade Emirate is a traditional state with headquarters in Gashua, Yobe State, Nigeria. Alhaji Abubakar Umar Suleiman is the 11th Emir of Bade (Mai Bade), turbaned on 12 November 2005. Bade Fishing Festival is observed at Bade Emirate.

== History ==
Bade, like many other Nigerian tribes, traced their historical emergence and establishment through the oral sources and a few written documents. The traditions regarding the origin of Bade are common especially among Bade people themselves and their neighbouring communities. It is pertinent to note that the legend of migration of Bade from the East is not only a Bade phenomenon, but also endemic within most of the North-Eastern tribes and most of the parts of Nigeria in general claimed an Eastern origin. But it could be plausible that the Bade people were from Arabia and migrated because of certain unspecified historical forces, which made them settle in present-day Bade Emirate.

Moving westwards, they came to Dadigar in present-day Bursari Local Government of Yobe State. There they split into four groups. In a report compiled by Mr Lethem, Assistant District Officer (A.D.O) on Nguru Division, ‘the King had a wife called Walu who bore him four sons; Ago, Muza, Amsagiya and Buyam. At Dadigar, these four brothers resolved to separate each taking a different direction. Ago, the eldest remained where he was and became the ancestor of the Bade (Yerima, 2017). This version is commonly acknowledged by the Bade all over the Emirate. The second son Muza, went north and became the ancestor of Tourek, Amsagiya became ancestors of Kindin while Ngizim descended from Buyam, who went south. The Bade people had settled in their present territory as early as c.1300 (Hogben and Kirk-Greene, 1963), by 1750, they had established their various clan units under their leaders called Dugums. As a result of Kanuri and Fulani attacks, Lawan Babuje of Gid-gid clan sought the support of the other Bade clan chiefs of Dumbari, Dagilwa, Garun-dole, Katamma, Tagali and Gunkwai and forged the Pan-Bade confederation which brought all Bade clans under one leadership and defended themselves against foreign attacks.

== Rulers ==
Rulers of the Emirate:

Title	Reign	Name	Birth/death							
Mai Bedde		Dugum Bugia								
Mai Bedde		Dugum Akuya dan Bugia								
Mai Bedde	c. 1820 - 1842	Lawan Babuje dan Dugum Akuya	(d. 1842)							
Mai Bedde	1842 - 1893	Al-Hajji dan Babuje	(d. 1893)							
Mai Bedde	1893 - 1897	Duna dan al-Hajji								
Mai Bedde	1897 - 1904	Salih dan al-Hajji	(d. 1919)							
Emir	1904 - 1919	Salih dan al-Hajji	(see above)							
Emir	1920 - 1941	Sulayman dan Salih								
Emir	1942 - 1945	Mai Umara dan al-Hajji	(d. 1945)	Emir	1980 - 1983	Mai abba kyari	Emir	1945 - 198	Mai Umar dan Sulayman	(b. 1919 d. 1981)
Emir	1981 - 2005	Mai Saleh Ibn Suleiman II (OFR)	(b. 1925 d. 2005)							
Emir	2005 -	Mai Abubakar Umar Suleiman	(b. January 1962)							
