= Muhammad Bara'u Mu'azu =

Alhaji Muhammad Bara'u Mu’azu II
- Sarkin Sudan

Emir of Kontagora
- Reign: 2021 - date
- Coronation: 12 July 2021
- Predecessor: Saidu Namaska
- Born: 1974; Kontagora, Niger State, Nigeria
- Father: Bara'u Mu'azu
- Religion: Islam
- Occupation: Entrepreneur

Alhaji Muhammad Bara'u Mu’azu II is the 7th Sarkin Sudan (Emir of Kontagora) was born in 1974 to the late Mu’azu Ibrahim. The grandson of the late Sarkin Sudan Ibrahim Nagwamatse.

== Education ==
Muhammad Bara'u Mu'azu II obtained numerous academic certificates at various levels. Muhammadu Barau Mu'azu completed his primary education from 1980 to 1986 at the primary school in Ibeto town. Afterwards, he enrolled in secondary school at Government Secondary School Kontagora, where he studied from 1986 to 1992. From 1994 to 1997, He then proceeded to Federal College of Education Kontagora, Where he obtained NCE certificate.

== Work ==
He worked with Salwa Global Company, where he held the position of General Manager.

== Reign ==
After the death of Sa'idu Namaska in 2021, Almost 43 people have submitted documents for the Kontagora throne. The Government of Abubakar Sani Bello recognized Muhammadu Barau Muazu II as his successor, after he was elected by the Council of King makers. His grandfather, Mu'azu Ibrahim was the 5th Emir of Kontagora, who was on the throne for about 13 years from 1961 to 1974. But other contestants disagreed with the election to the throne, so they decided to take their case to court. After the court halted his appointment, the subsequent court proceedings confirmed his appointment.
