= Kontagora =

- LGA and town
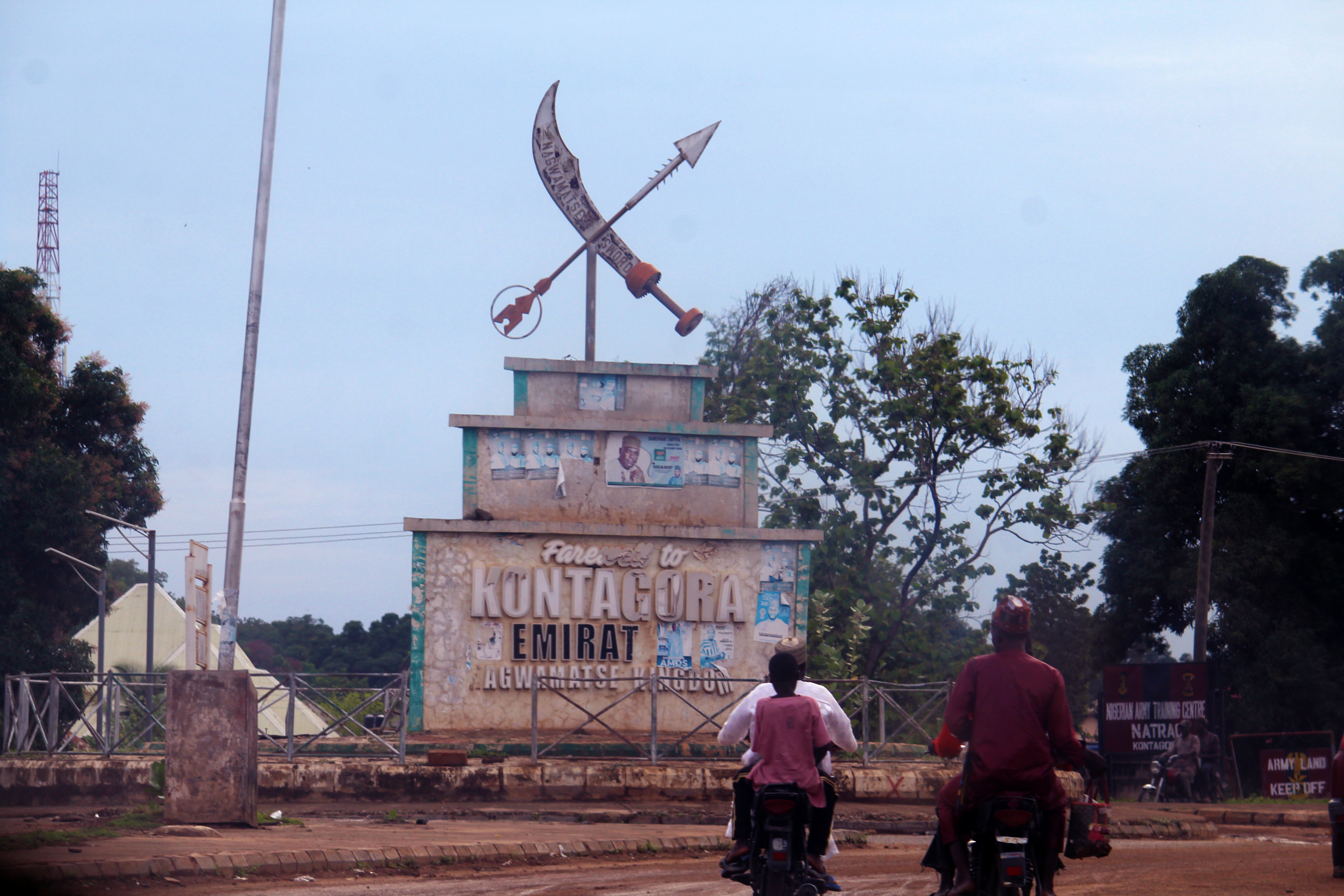
- Nagwamatse roundabout in Kontagora
- Nickname: KNT
- Interactive map of Kontagora
- Location within Nigeria
- Country: Nigeria
- State: Niger State

Government
  - Local Government Chairman and the Head of the Local Government Council: Alhaji shehu s pawa (sarkin pawan Mai Sudan)
  - Emir: Muhammad Bara'u Mu'azu

Population (2006)
  - Total: 98,763
- Time zone: UTC+1 (WAT)
- Postal code: 923101

Kontagora is a major town on the south bank of the Kontagora River in north-west Niger State, Nigeria. It is the capital city of the Kontagora Emirate. The former Niger state governor, Alhaji Abubakar Sani Bello hails from Kontagora. On December 15, 1995, the Roman Catholic Apostolic Vicariate of Kontagora was established here. St Michael's Cathedral is the seat of the apostolic vicar.

== History ==
Kontagora was founded by Umaru Nagwamatse, after conquering a large amount of land owned by non-Muslim Kambaris. Umaru then set up Kontagora as the kingdom’s capital in 1864, making himself the first emir of Kontagora. Throughout Umaru’s rule, he greatly expanded the emirate. When his son Ibrahim Nagwamatse became emir in 1880, the emirates became notorious for slave-raids that left the area severely under-populated. This left the area with many abandoned villages, despite a state sponsored re-populated plan in between 1949 and 1956. In 1899, Ibrahim captured the town of Birnin Gwari, causing the emirate of Zaria to get help from the British. Ibrahim threatened the British base in Jebba, causing the British to capture Kontagora city in 1901. When Ibrahim was reinstated as emir in 1903, his power was greatly reduced.

== Climate ==
The temperature in the region fluctuates year-round, ranging from 58 °F to 97 °F, with occasional dips below 53 °F or above 103 °F.
