= Mufutau Adesanya Kasali =

Oba Mufutau Adesanya Kasali Iboriaran I
- Moyegeso of Itele
- Coronation: 3 March 2003
- Predecessor: Oba Jones Adenola Ogunde Adeyoruwa II

Mufutau Adesanya Kasali MFR is the present Oba Moyegeso of Itele in Ijebu-East, Ogun State, Nigeria.

== Early life and education ==
Mufutau Adesanya Kasali was born on 13 December 1943. He attended Ijebu Ode Grammar School in Ijebu Ode from 1961 to 1966 for his secondary education. He later proceeded to the University of Lagos where he earned a degree in Electrical Engineering in 1972. He is a trained engineer and also a member of Nigerian Society of Engineers.

== Career ==
He worked as a senior engineer with the old National Electrical Power Authority (NEPA), now Power Holding Company of Nigeria (PHCN) until his retirement.

== Selection and coronation ==
He was unanimously selected from the Ishagbola Ruling House as the Oba Moyegeso of Itele-Elect in 2000. He was subsequently crowned and presented instruments of office by the Ogun State Government on March 3, 2003.

== Awards ==
In 2011, Kasali was awarded MFR, a national honour by the Federal Government of Nigeria.
