= Ose, Nigeria =

- LGA
- Interactive map of Ose, Nigeria
- Country: Nigeria
- State: Ondo State
- Headquarter: Ifon

Area
  - Total: 1,465 km^{2} (566 sq mi)

Population (2006)
  - Total: 144,901
  - Density: 98.91/km^{2} (256.2/sq mi)
- Time zone: UTC+1 (WAT)
- Postal code: 341

Ose is a Local Government Area in Ondo State, Southwest Nigeria. Its headquarters is in the town of Ifon. It is made up communities including Ikaro, Okeluse, Ijagba, Imoru, Arimogija, Elegbeka (Ikaro), Ogberuwen, Ute, Ifon, Omi-alafa, Ugbonla, and Ogbese Falodun to the south; and Ido-ani, Idogun, Ido-isale, Afo, and Imeri to the north.

A short introductory expose of Ifon in the Ifon dialect by a native speaker

The major activity of this region is farming, mostly based around cocoa and plantation farming.

The traditional ruler of Ifon, Oba Israel Adegoke Adewusi, was murdered on 26 November 2020.

It has an area of 1,465 km^{2} and a population of 144,901 as of the 2006 census.

== Climate ==
Ose experiences a tropical wet-and-dry climate with a prolonged rainy season and moderate to high annual rainfall. The dry season features warm temperatures and clearer skies, typical of inland Ondo LGAs.

== Economy ==
The agricultural sector of Ose Local Government Area is rather active, and the region is well-known for growing a variety of commodities, including pepper, cocoa, and plantains. Additionally, the mineral kaolin is abundantly found in the LGA. In Ose LGA, trade is also thriving. The region is home to a number of markets, including the Ido-Ani community market, which draws hundreds of vendors and consumers of various goods. Blacksmithing, livestock husbandry, textile weaving, and craft making are some of the other significant economic pursuits of the residents of Ose local government area.
