= Olasunkanmi Abioye Opeola, Kurunloju I =

Nigerian ruler (born 1961)

HRH Oba Olasunkanmi Abioye Opeola Kurunloju I

Oniroko of Iroko
- In office 4 February 2011 – May 30, 2025
- Preceded by: Adeyanju Opeola

Personal details
- Born: 9 March 1961 (age 65) Iroko
- Died: May 30, 2025 Iroko
- Resting place: Iroko
- Citizenship: Nigeria
- Spouse: Olori Modinat Toyin Abioye
- Profession: Traditional Ruler

Olasunkanmi Abioye Opeola, Kurunloju I (9 March 1961 - 30 May 2025) was the Oniroko, or traditional ruler, of the Yoruba town of Iroko, Oyo State, Nigeria. He ruled from 4 February 2011 until his demise.

|https://nationalinsightnews.com/oniroko-of-iroko-joins-his-ancestors/

== Early life ==
H.R.H Oba Olasunkanmi was born on 9 March 1961, into the Opeola Ruling House. He is the first Oniroko from the Abioye faction of Opeola.

Olasunkanmi attended Iroko Grammar School, Iroko, then went on to St' Andrew's Teachers' College, Iseyin in 1979, obtaining a Grade II certificate in 1982. He joined the Oyo State Teaching Service in 1983, and attended the College of Education, Ikere-Ekiti from 2000 to 2002, obtaining a Nigeria Certificate in Education (NCE). He retired from the teaching service in 2012 as an Assistant Headmaster.

== Legal dispute ==
When Olasunkanmi became Oniroko, he became the first leader of Iroko in over thirty years. There had previously been a dispute over who owned land in the area. The legal dispute was brought by Chief Kolapo Adedokun Adetunji. In an interview with the Nigerian Tribune on 13 March 2012, the Oniroko said

"The man wrote a petition to the then Oyo State governor, General Oladayo Popoola, that he had a right to the Oniroko throne. This issue remained in and out of court for period of 32 years before the court finally gave its ruling on 31 January 2011 and before the man could go back to court, all evidences were tendered that a new Oniroko had been installed, in accordance with the directives of the state government."

== See also ==
List of Nigerian traditional states
