= Olofin Adimula Oodua =

Traditional Ruler and Yoruba king of Ado-Odo

The Olofin Adimula Oodua of Ado-Odo is the Traditional Ruler and Yoruba king of Ado-Odo; he is also referred to as the Oba of Ado. Ado-Odo is the metropolitan headquarters of the Ado Kingdom in Ogun State, Southwestern Nigeria.

The Oba of Ado is a permanent member of the Ogun State Council of Obas and presently ranks next in rank to the Paramount Ruler in Yewa Traditional Council. The Olofin Adimula Oodua equally enjoys special first-class status culminating in the front row seating arrangement he enjoys next to the current four Paramount Rulers in the Ogun State Council of Obas and the Chairman of Ado-Odo/Ota Traditional Council or Obas Council.

His Imperial Majesty, Oba Olusola Idris Osolo Otenibotemole II, is the current Olofin, succeeding His Imperial Majesty, Late Oba Abdul-Lateef Adeniran Akanni Ojikutujoye I who reigned from (2 May 2009 to 7 January 2022).

== History ==
Oba Asade Awope, Olofin Otenibotemole had the singular honour of reigning over Ado and Erekiti kingdoms which was a rare feat in pre-colonial times. His successful defense at the Lagos legislative house after the harassment by the British for unsubstantiated allegations qualified him as a hero of early Nigerian nationalism. In the Gazette No. 9 of 1903 enacted on 28 February 1903, Oba of Ado was listed as one of the twenty-two beaded crowns of Yoruba land (first gazette).

== Ado-Odo Kingmakers ==
Principally, four groups constitute the core indigenous people of Ado presently identified as the Awori indigenes of Ado-Odo. They occupy the two components of Osì and Ogona, which were sub-divided to the four quarters of Oke-Osi, Odo-Osi, Odojana, and Okejana. These quarters form the basis of cultural interaction, land ownership, and the Chieftaincy institution in Ado Kingdom.

Following the approved Chieftaincy Declaration according to the Western Regional Government official gazette in the 1950s, the kingmakers and members of Oba-in-Council for Ado-Odo are the following:

- Chief Osolo of Ado
- Chief Ira of Ado
- Chief Bajomu of Ado
- Chief Aro of Ado
- Chief Oga-Ilu Odo-Ijana, Ado (Head of Oga Ilus)
- Chief Oga-Ilu Oke-Osi, Ado
- Chief Oga-Ilu Oke-Ijana, Ado
- Chief Oga-Ilu Odo-Osi, Ado

Each of these Quarters constitutes the traditional chiefs, who are kingmakers and assigned to perform specific roles in the Town. Bajomu, Osolo, Ira, Aro are the head of fore core indigenous Awori Quarters and also the custodians of the shrines in their quarters. These four kingmakers are traditionally empowered to elect the king (Oba) for the Town.
