= Itele =

Itele Itele Amoyegeso
- Town
- Motto(s): Omo Itele Amoyegeso, Omo Apepe Lori Ege.
- Location in Nigeria
- Coordinates: 6°46′00″N 4°03′45″E
- Country: Nigeria
- State: Ogun State
- LGA: Ijebu East
- Established: 17th century (circa)
- Founder: Ojigi Amoyegeso Circa 1710

Government
  - Moyegeso: Oba Mufutau Adesanya Kasali Iboriaran I

Population
  - Total: 110,196 (Year 2,006 Census Ijebu East LGA)
- Time zone: UTC+1 (WAT)
- 3-digit postal code prefix: 120

Itele or Ijebu-Itele, is a town in the Ogun state of Nigeria, about 460 kilometres (286 mi) from Abuja, the country's capital. The community is part of Ijebu-East LGA. It is considered a traditional state because it is headed by a king (Oba) with the royal title of Moyegeso, a part II Oba as stated in the official gazette in 1990 of the Ogun State Government, now elevated to first class Oba. The incumbent is Oba Mufutau Adesanya Kasali Iboriaran I.

== People ==
The town produced one of the foremost Chartered Accountants in Nigeria, a former president of ICAN Otunba Adedoyin Olaide Ogunde, who also was a partner at KPMG Peat Marwick Ani Ogunde &co. A former deputy governor of Ogun State, Alhaji Chief. Rafiu Ogunleye hailed from Agbodu quarters of Itele. Late educationist, Prof. Samuel O. Onakomaiya, a former deputy vice chancellor at former Ogun State University, now Olabisi Onabanjo University was from Itele. In the diaspora, Late Chief Mrs Opeoluwa Solanke-Ogunbiyi (Nee Obisanya), popular known in the United Kingdom in the 1940s and 50s as Mama WASU was from the town. Also, Ijebu-Itele is the hometown to the popular rap artist Olamide Baddo, he has referred to the town in some of his songs as his father's hometown. Itele people are known to be industrious just like the rest of the Ijebus. Activities in the town varies from farming, fishing to trade. A typical Ijebu man from Itele is expected to own a piece of land for farming. The women also are into trade.

== Education ==
The source of orthodox education in Itele was primarily Christian missionary-based. The first set of schools were set up by the Anglican and Catholic missions, respectively. Initially, St. John's Anglican Primary School was established by the Anglican mission early in 1898, and St. Francis School was established afterwards. The town has actually evolved in terms of educational institutions as it can now boast of many of them, both publicly owned and government controlled schools, even now a university. First of its kind in Ogun East Senatorial District. The main secondary school in the town is Itele High School, established in 1978, which is a community school administered by the state government. However, On March 15, 2015, the Federal Executive Council chaired by the then vice-president of Nigeria Namadi Sambo of the Federal Government of Nigeria approved the establishment of Hallmark University, Ijebu-Itele, a privately owned tertiary institution.

== Culture ==
Just like the rest of the Ijebu people, the people of Itele are rich in culture. In fact, Itele is believed to be an important part of the Ijebu Kingdom. History has it that when Obanta arrived Ijebuland from Ile-Ife. He paused in Itele for a while before proceeding to Ijebu-Ode. It was in Itele that he lost his mother, Gborowo near the Osun River in Itele. The river is known today as Osun Gborowo in honour of the mother of Obanta. That is why the Awujale usually sends a cow to Itele every year for sacrifice in remembrance of Gborowo. There is a time of the year, in the month of November, to be precise when the sons and daughters of the town gather to celebrate Itele Day. Other festivals celebrated in the town are: Jigbo festival, Agbo masquerade etc.

== Structure ==
The following are the quarters and villages in Itele:

- Odole,
- Agbodu,
- Odomore,
- Atoyo,
- Odontoko,
- Odojagbidi,
- Idonna
- Igbaguru,
- Ododagunja,
- Aledo,
- Tinagolu,
- Olorunpodo
- Okebu,
- Atakobo,
- Isosun,
- Tolowa,
- Totunba,
- Imegun,
- Agerige,
- Okenla,
- Tigbori,
- Apata,
  - Eyin Osun (Free Zone as it is close to Omo Forestry Reserve),
  - Odoladalepo*(disputed with Ijebu-Ife).

The government of Ogun State is presently negotiating the proposal of a power generation in one of the Villages under Itele Local Government (precisely Tigbori - TIGBORI POWER PLANT GENERATION COMPANY).
