= Ado-Odo =

Ado-Odo Ado
- Town
- Interactive map of Ado-Odo
- Coordinates: 6°35′N 2°57′E
- Country: Nigeria
- State: Ogun
- LGA(s): Ado-Odo/Ota

Government
  - Olofin Adimula Oodua: HIM Oba Olusola Idris Osolo Adebowale Otenibotemole II
- Time zone: WAT
- Postal code: 112103

Ado-Odo is an ancient town in Ogun State, southwestern Nigeria. The traditional ruler holds the title Olofin Adimula Oodua and is a permanent member of the Ogun State Traditional Council in Ogun State.

Ado is populated mainly by the Awori people, with other groups including Egba, Egun, and Yewa (Egbado) communities. The area produces cash and food crops, particularly cocoa, kola nut, palm oil, cassava, and vegetables.

== History ==
=== Colonial period ===
During the late 19th century, the British colonial administration expanded its authority over the Yoruba hinterland from its base in the Lagos Colony. In 1890, the British established a post at nearby Ilaro, and on 13 August 1891 a treaty was signed placing Ilaro under British protection.

According to Asiwaju (1976), the Ado Kingdom was not at any time under Oyo imperial control, unlike the Egba and Dahomean vassal kingdoms that paid tribute to the Alafin of Oyo.

=== Regional conflicts ===
During the 19th-century Yoruba civil wars, the broader region between present-day Abeokuta and the coast was disrupted by conflict, particularly the Egba–Dahomey wars. Communities such as Ilase and Ajilete in the Ado-Odo area originated as settlements for populations displaced during these conflicts.

The Awori, including the communities around Ado-Odo, are internally differentiated, comprising diverse traditional kingdoms such as Ado-Odo, Igbesa, and Agbara, whose traditional rulers are members of the Yewa Traditional Council presided over by the Olu of Ilaro as Paramount Ruler.

== Monarch ==
The traditional ruler (Oba) of Ado-Odo holds the title Oba of Ado and Olofin Adimula Oodua. The current Olofin is Oba Olusola Idris Osolo Adebowale Otenibotemole II, who was presented with the staff of office by Governor Dapo Abiodun in March 2024. He succeeded Oba Abdul-Lateef Adeniran Akanni Ojikutujoye I, who reigned from 2 May 2009 until his death on 7 January 2022.

== Boundaries ==
Ado-Odo shares boundaries with several communities in Ogun State and Lagos State. Adjoining villages including Igbo Eji, Ikoga-Zebbe, Ikoga Ile, Bandu, Potta, and Igborosun were excised from the Ado-Odo area in 1976 and merged with Lagos State. Communities including Ijako, Owo, Ishagbo Oke, Ishagbo Isale, and Iranje were formerly part of the Ado-Odo/Igbesa district until administrative reorganisation in 1982.

According to tradition, the community of Itire in Lagos was established by migrants from Ado-Odo, and the installation rites for the Onitire of Itire-Lagos are traditionally performed in the Ere Ward of Ado-Odo.

== Festivals ==
The principal traditional festival in Ado-Odo is the Oduduwa festival (Odun Alaje), which is held annually. The festival involves the parade of two bulls around the town, rope games, and a ritual in which passers-by are struck with a soft cane (Igbo) as part of traditional cleansing rites. Igbi-Ora and gbedu drums are used during the festival, and the ceremonies are led by the Oba Ora and other chiefs, including women chieftains known as Alaje and Aragba.

The Aja-speaking peoples of the region, including those in the Ado-Odo area, have maintained cultural practices linked to their origins in Ile-Ife and the Kingdom of Benin.

== See also ==
- Awori people
- Yoruba people
- Ado-Odo/Ota
- Ogun State
- Olofin Adimula Oodua
