= Sindhooram =

Sindhooram may refer to:

- Sindoor, a red vermilion powder applied by married Hindu women in India
  - Sindoor Daan, a Bengali Hindu wedding tradition
  - Sindur Khela, a Bengali Hindu tradition on the festival of Vijayadashami
- Sindhooram (1976 film), an Indian Malayalam film directed by Jeassy
- Sindhooram (1997 film), an Indian Telugu film written and directed by Krishna Vamsi
- Sindhooram (2023 film), an Indian Telugu film directed by Shyam Tummalapalli
- Sindhuram, an Indian Telugu television show broadcast by Star Maa
- Operation Sindoor, an Indian Air Force operation against terrorist training camps in Pakistan

== See also ==
- Sindooracheppu, 1971 Indian film
- Sindhura, Hindustani classical raga
- Sindhuri, Indian actress
- Sindhura Lakshmana, Indian freedom fighter
- Sinduri, village in Pauri Garhwal district, Uttarakhand, India
- Sinduria, town in Jharkhand, India
- Sinduriya, village in Barun, Bihar, India
- Sinduriya Kachari railway station, Rajgarh district, Madhya Pradesh, India
