= Ita Egbe =

Rural town in Ogun, Nigeria

Ita Egbe Ìta Ẹgbẹ́ Ita-Egbe
- Rural Town
- Ita Egbe
- Location within Nigeria
- Coordinates: 6.64504°N 2.83263°E
- Country: Nigeria
- State: Ogun
- Local Government Area: Ipokia
- Local Council Development Area: Idiroko
- Founder: Oregi

Government
  - Type: King
  - Ọba (Onita Egbe): Saanu Babayanju Adenle
- Time zone: GMT+01:00
- Postal code: 112101

Ita Egbe (Yoruba: Ìta Ẹgbẹ́) is a Rural town located in the Ipokia Local Government Area of Ogun State, Nigeria. Situated near the border with the Republic of Benin, Ita Egbe is known for its agricultural significance, particularly in the production of palm oil, tomatoes, watermelon, maize, and cassava. It is also recognized for its rich cultural heritage, strategic location, and role in local trade.

== Geography ==
Ita Egbe is located at coordinates 6.64504°N latitude and 2.83263°E longitude, within the Ipokia Local Government Area of Ogun State. The village lies in the southwestern region of Nigeria, close to the border with the Republic of Benin. Ita Egbe is part of the Idiroko Local Council Development Area (LCDA), which includes other border communities.

The terrain around Ita Egbe is predominantly flat and low-lying, making it highly suitable for agriculture. The tropical climate, characterized by distinct wet and dry seasons, supports the cultivation of a wide variety of crops. The village's fertile soil contributes to the successful farming of products like palm oil, tomatoes, watermelon, maize, and cassava.

== History ==
Ita Egbe has a rich historical background, deeply connected to the traditions of the Yoruba people. The village was founded by early settlers, believed to have been led by a man named Oregi. According to local lore, Oregi and his followers established the community in the area, which became a thriving agricultural settlement. The name "Ìta Ẹgbẹ́" translates to "the place of the group" in the Yoruba language, reflecting the community's emphasis on togetherness and cooperation. Over the centuries, Ita Egbe has grown into a vibrant village that blends traditional Yoruba practices with modern influences. The governance of the village is overseen by a traditional leader known as the Ọba, who serves as both a cultural and administrative head. The current Onita Egbe of Ita Egbe is His Royal Majesty Saanu Babayanju Adenle, who has been instrumental in maintaining the village's cultural identity and promoting its development.

== Demographics ==
According to the 1963 Nigerian Population Census, Ita Egbe had a population of 1,776 people. While the population has likely increased since then, detailed current population statistics are not readily available. The majority of Ita Egbe's population is of Yoruba descent, and the Yoruba language is widely spoken.

The community is known for its close-knit structure, with many families depending on agriculture as their primary source of livelihood. The village is also home to several migrant groups who have settled in the area for agricultural work or trade, adding to its cultural diversity.

== Economy ==
Ita Egbe is primarily an agricultural community, and its economy is based on the production of a variety of crops. The village is one of the largest producers of palm oil in the Ipokia Local Government Area. Palm oil production is a major economic activity in Ita Egbe, with many households involved in the cultivation of oil palm trees and the processing of palm oil for local and regional markets.

In addition to palm oil, Ita Egbe is known for its production of tomatoes, watermelon, maize, and cassava. These crops are vital to the local diet and are sold in markets throughout the region, including in nearby towns like Idiroko and Ota. The fertile soil and favourable climate conditions make the village a key player in the agriculture sector within Ogun State.

- Tomatoes: Ita Egbe produces a significant quantity of tomatoes, which are a staple in Nigerian cuisine. Tomato farming in the area is driven by the high demand for fresh tomatoes in local markets and the processing of tomatoes into paste and other products.
- Watermelon: The cultivation of watermelon has become increasingly popular in Ita Egbe, as the crop thrives in the village's tropical climate. Watermelon is grown both for local consumption and for sale in surrounding towns and cities.
- Maize: Maize is another major crop in Ita Egbe, providing food security for the community. The village's maize is used for local consumption, as well as sold in regional markets.
- Cassava: Cassava is a staple crop in the village, used to produce a variety of products such as garri, fufu, and tapioca. It is also an important cash crop, with farmers selling both fresh cassava tubers and processed products.

The village's strategic location near the border with Benin has also allowed it to engage in cross-border trade, which further boosts its economy. The trade of agricultural products across the border contributes to the local economy, although issues such as smuggling and security concerns in the border region have sometimes affected economic activities.

== Cuisine ==
The cuisine of Ita Egbe, like much of southwestern Nigeria, is characterized by the use of local ingredients, including a variety of staple foods and crops grown in the region. Cassava, maize, palm oil, and tomatoes form the basis of many traditional dishes enjoyed by the people of Ita Egbe.

- Ọkà: One of the most popular dishes in Ita Egbe is Ọkà, a dish made from corn flour (maize flour) and sometimes mixed with cassava flour. It is similar to fufu but is typically smoother and more flexible in texture. Ọkà is often served with a variety of soups, making it a staple in the local diet.
- Jollof Rice: A common dish across Nigeria, Jollof rice is made with rice cooked in a flavorful tomato-based sauce, often served with meat or fish. The tomatoes used in this dish are locally grown in Ita Egbe.
- Soups: The people of Ita Egbe enjoy a variety of soups that are made from locally sourced ingredients. Some of the most popular soups include:
  - Okra Soup: A thick soup made with okra, often combined with meat, fish, and spices.
  - Ẹ̀fọ́ Riro: A rich vegetable soup made with spinach or other leafy vegetables, often cooked with meat, fish, or both.
  - Àfọ̀ Soup: A traditional soup made from palm fruit, which is also a local specialty. This soup is typically thick and full of flavour, often prepared with meats like goat or beef.

These foods are not only central to the daily diet of Ita Egbe's residents but also play an important role in social and cultural gatherings. Traditional meals are often served during festivals, celebrations, and communal events, bringing people together and strengthening social bonds.

== Cultural Heritage ==
Ita Egbe is home to a rich cultural heritage that is strongly influenced by Yoruba traditions. The village celebrates several important festivals throughout the year, which attract large numbers of people and contribute to the social and cultural vibrancy of the community.

Major Festivals:

- Egungun festival: The Egungun festival is one of the most important and widely celebrated festivals in Ita Egbe. It is a traditional Yoruba festival that honours the spirits of ancestors. During this festival, the village is filled with colourful processions and masqueraders, known as Egungun, who perform dances and rituals. The festival is characterized by music, drumming, and the display of elaborate costumes, and it plays a central role in the village's spiritual and cultural life.
- Oro Festival: The Oro festival is another significant festival in Ita Egbe. This festival is dedicated to the worship of the Yoruba god Oro, who is associated with justice and the protection of the community. During the festival, the village is marked by sacred rituals, and the participation of men in particular is considered vital to the success of the event. The festival involves processions and prayers, and the Oro deity is believed to bring prosperity and blessings to the people.
- Ẹ̀fẹ̀ Festival: The Ẹ̀fẹ̀ festival is another major cultural event in Ita Egbe. The festival is marked by large gatherings of people who come together to celebrate the harvest and honour their ancestors. During this festival, the village is filled with music, dance, and performances by various cultural groups. It is a time for communal feasting, and the festival highlights the importance of unity and tradition in the village.

During these festivals, the village of Ita Egbe is filled with crowds of people, both locals and visitors, who come to witness the celebrations and take part in the communal activities. These events are crucial to preserving the cultural identity of the village and fostering a sense of belonging among its residents.

== Education ==
Education is a priority in Ita Egbe, and the village has both primary and secondary schools to cater to the educational needs of the local population.

- Primary Schools: The village has several primary schools, which serve as the foundation of education for many children in the community. These schools focus on providing basic literacy and numeracy skills, as well as grounding students in the cultural values of the community.
- Secondary Schools: Ita Egbe is home to at least one notable secondary school, the Christian Community Grammar School, which was developed by the local community in collaboration with the Christian community. This school provides secondary education to young people in the village and surrounding areas. It has become an important institution for providing education beyond the primary level, offering subjects that prepare students for further studies or vocational training.

Many students from Ita Egbe attend secondary schools in nearby towns like Idiroko, which has better infrastructure for secondary education. Despite the challenges faced by rural communities, such as limited resources and facilities, there have been efforts to improve the quality of education in the village, with the Ogun State government and local organizations working to upgrade schools and provide better learning materials.
