= Idiroko =

Idiroko is a town in Ipokia local government of Ogun State, Nigeria. It is situated along the Nigeria-Benin border with the Beninese town of Igolo on the opposite side and has been an official border crossing point since at least the 1960s. The town is surrounded by many other towns and villages including Oniro, Oke Odan, Ilase, Ita Egbe, Ajilete amongst others.

Due to the location of an official cross-border post and as a result of cross-border trading activities within the frontier town, Idiroko has grown from a village to become a town. The residents of Idiroko are multilingual because of their mixed culture due to cross-cultural contact and intermarriages.

== Geography and environment ==
Idiroko is located on the Nigeria-Benin border along the Lagos-Badagry-Porto Novo highway. The area is about 55 metres (180 feet) above sea level and along the West African coastal plain. The average annual rainfall is between 1500 mm and 2000 mm. The weather pattern follows those of nearby communities with a rainy season from May to October.

== People ==
The indigenous people of Idiroko are the Yorubas, the Anago and the Egun and languages spoken by residents include Nigerian Pidgin, French, English and Yoruba. Idiroko also has a large transient population as a result of cross border trading.

Historically, the people of Idiriko and the town of Igolo were one community until the partitioning of the area in the nineteenth century by the French who took Igolo and the British who claimed Idiroko. The present area known as Idiroko is a combination of various settler wards including Ikolaje, Eti-koto, Itaoba, Sale, Idiroko, Kajola and Ajegunle.

== Economy ==
The area surrounding the town has a thick vegetation which provides timber logs for surrounding communities. Apart from lumbering, farming and trading of food produce is another major activity of residents of Idiroko. Though farming is largely used for subsistence living, it sometimes provides stock used by women for produce trading in the town.

== Smuggling ==
Due to the location of the town along the Nigeria-Benin border, an illegal smuggling trade exists within the settlement. Illegal cross-border trade is carried out by settlers and transient populations using knowledge of the local population to create alternative routes within the border. Among the goods smuggled are petrol, poultry, tyres, motor parts, drugs, cars and electronics. There exist at least six illegal entry points in the area.

The frontier post is also used by human traffickers to carry young girls and boys from the Republic of Benin into Nigeria. Sometimes, the underage children are leased by their parents to work in Lagos for a stipulated time frame. Most of the children are taken from Benin to serve as maid or house helps in Nigerian households.

== Government ==
Idiroko is located in Ipokia local government. Because it is a border town, it has administrative units of the Nigerian police, army, customs and immigration stationed in the town.

Traditionally, the town is ruled by the Oba, the Oniko of Idiroko, who is aided by a council of chiefs.

== Sources ==
- Omoniyi, Tope (2004). The sociolinguistics of borderlands: two nations, one community. Trenton: Africa Word Press. ISBN 0865439109.*Tunde (October 2, 2011). "Red Alert at the Country's Borders Over Libyan, Nigerien Fighters". Daily Trust. Abuja.*Terkula, Igidi (January 3, 2016). "Nigeria: Corruption Thrives At Nigeria's Borders". Daily Trust. Abuja.*Afolayan (2000). "Trans-Border Movement and Trading. A case study of a borderland in southwestern Nigeria". Institut français de recherche en Afrique.
