= Agada =

Branch of ayurveda medicine

Agada is one of the eight branches into which ayurveda medicine is traditionally divided. Literally, gada means a disease and agada means any agent which makes the body free from disease; however the term agada is used specifically for the branch of medicine dealing with toxicology, the description of the different types of poisons, and their antidotes.

Agada Tantra is defined as a section of toxicology that deals with food poisoning, snakebites, dog bites, insect bites, etc. The school of toxicology was founded and expounded upon by Kashyapa, also known as Vriddhakashyapa, a contemporary of Atreya Punarvasu. He lived in Taksashila in what is now Pakistan. His text was called the Kashyapa Samhita. This, however, is a different book than the Kashyap Samhita of pediatrics. This text is not available now but the references of this text are found mentioned in different commentaries. Some other texts written by Alambayana, Ushana, Saunaka, and Latyayana were known to exist. However except for references to them, the original texts are no longer available.

The traditional practice of toxicology is still practiced by different families of vishavaidyas (poison doctors), who specialize in toxicology. However, their knowledge is limited compared to the knowledge possessed by the earlier ayurvedic physicians. In ancient times, it was the job of Vishavaidyas to protect members of the royal family from being poisoned, as well to poison enemies of the kings.

== More sources ==
- Search on Google Books
- Forensic medicine under Indian system of medicine(Ayurveda). By Dr. U. N. Prasad
