= Sindur Khela =

Bengali Hindu tradition on Vijayadashami

Sindur Khela সিঁদুর খেলা
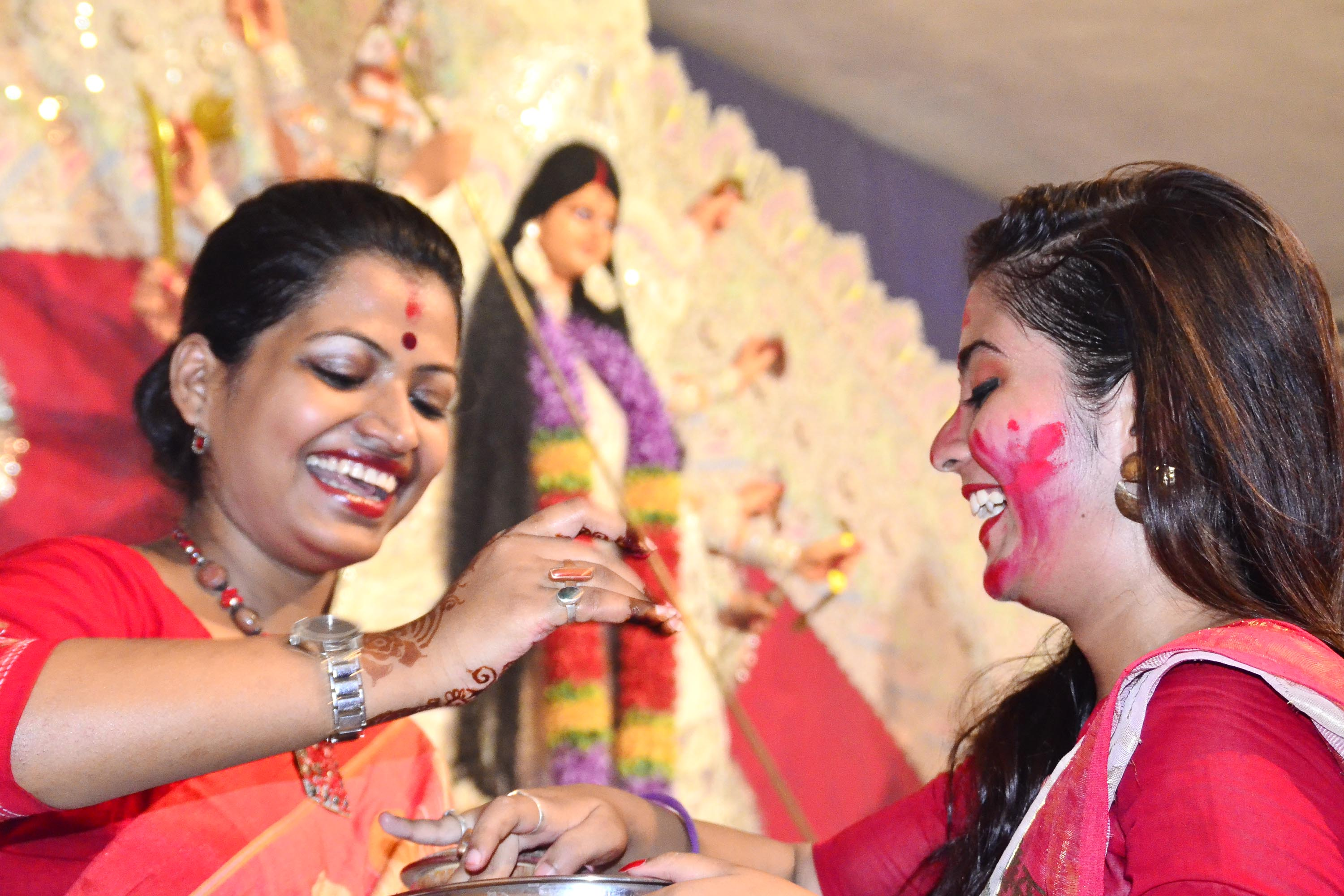
- Sindur Khela at Nagaon, Assam
- Genre: Tradition
- Date: Vijayadashami
- Frequency: Annual
- Venue: Durga Puja pandal
- Country: India, Bangladesh

Sindur Khela (Bengali: সিঁদুর খেলা), literally meaning 'vermillion game', is a Bengali Hindu tradition where women smear each other with sindur on Vijayadashami, the last day of the Durga Puja. On the day of the Vijayadashami after the conclusion of the ritual worship, married Bengali Hindu women apply sindur on the forehead and feet of the goddess and offer sweets to her. Then they put sindur on each other's faces and offer sweets to each other.

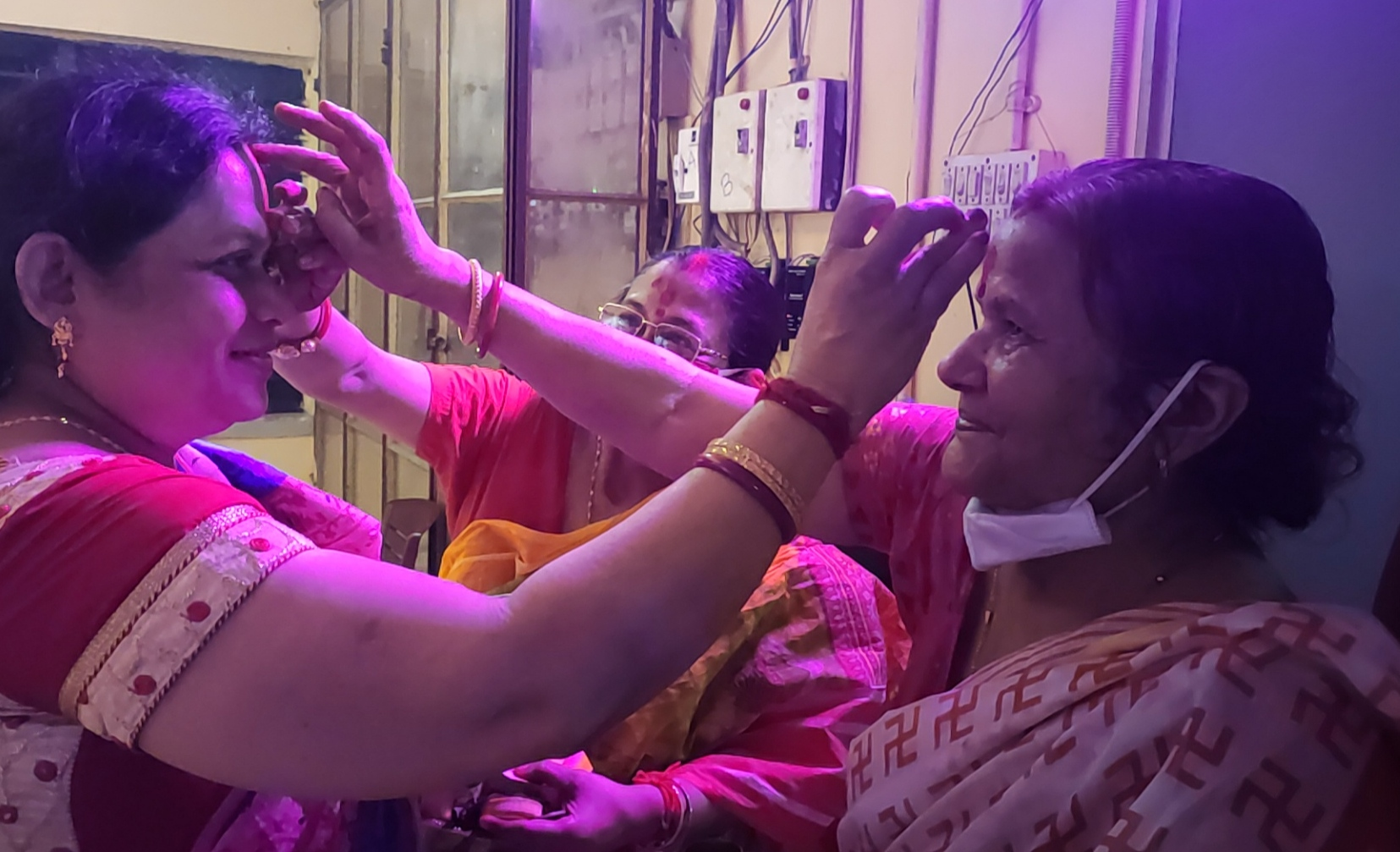
Sindur Khela in new normal days at Kolkata

== Origin ==
The exact date and place of origin of the tradition is not known. According to one theory, the tradition originated around 200 years ago in the Durga Pujas of the zamindar houses to usher bonhomie among the housewives. According to a second theory, the tradition of Sindur Khela is as old as Durga Puja itself, around 400 years. The ritual is enjoyed just like a game and hence the name Sindur Khela. Sindur Khela is regarded as one of the most important rituals of Vijayadashami.

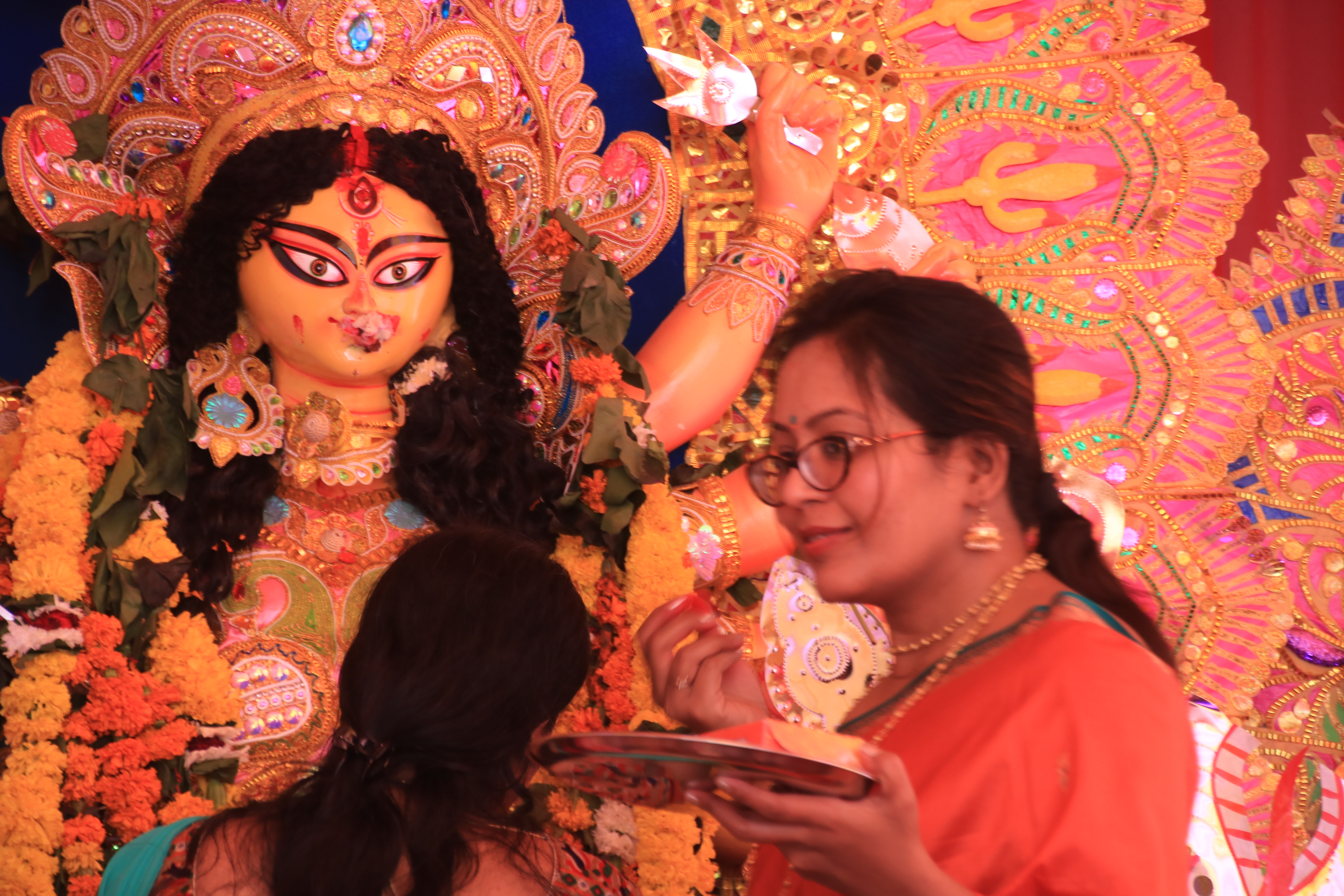
Bengali woman participating in Sindur Khela in puja pandal in Delhi

== Contemporary ritual ==
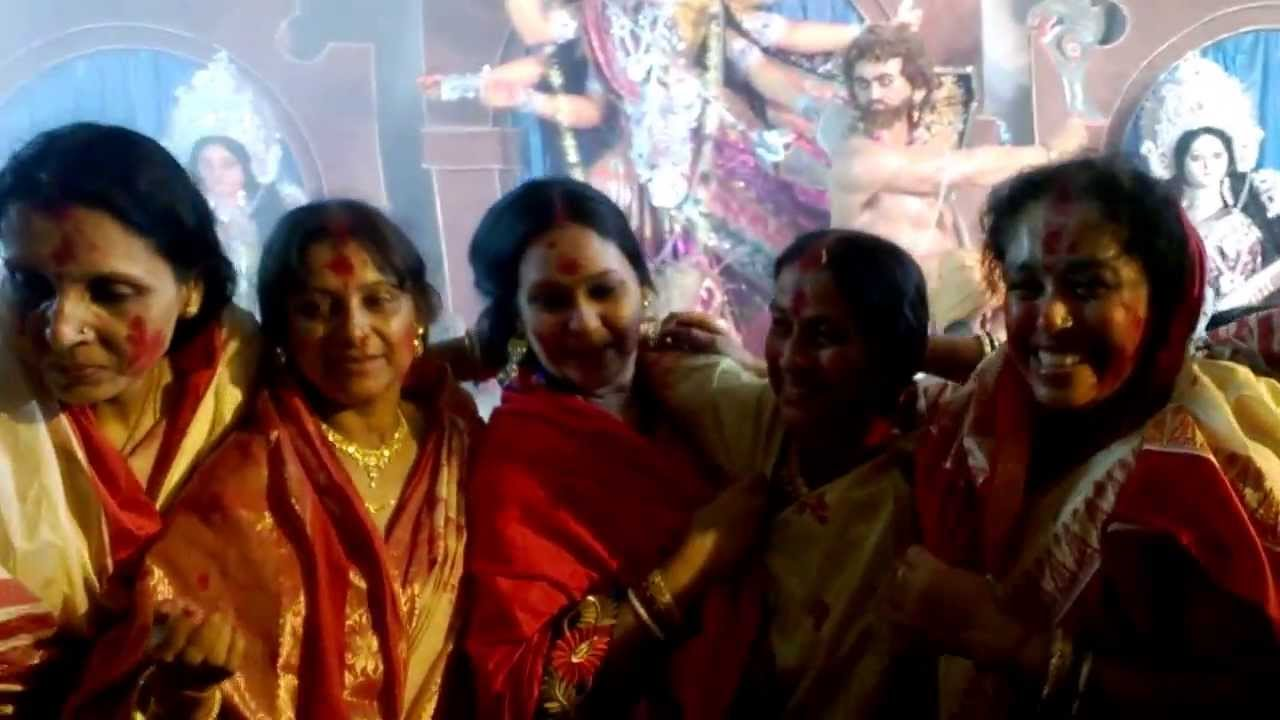
Women pose for photographs after Sindur Khela in Sainthia, West Bengal

The ritual worship of the goddess concludes with the Visarjan Puja. It is followed by Devi Baran, where the married women bid farewell to the goddess. The women are usually dressed in white saris with red borders and adorn traditional jewelries. Each of the women perform arati and smear the goddess' forehead and feet with sindur. They also offer her sweets and betel leaves. Following that the women smear each other's foreheads with sindur. Then they put sindur on each other's shankha, pala and noa, the conch shell, coral and iron bangles respectively, which are worn by the married Bengali Hindu women. Then they smear each other's faces with sindur. Finally they offer sweets to each other as prasad. According to commonly held belief, if a woman plays Sindur Khela by following the proper custom, she will never be widowed.

Sindur Khela symbolizes the power of womanhood in protecting her husband and children from all evil. Through the ritual of Sindur Khela, the Bengali Hindu women pray for long and happy married lives of each other. Family tiffs and petty quarrels between neighbours are settled through this ritual. Unmarried women and widows are barred from participating in the ritual, but a recent campaign by the Calcutta Times has revived the practice of just women - be it married, widowed, transgender individuals or women of the red-light area, to play with Sindoor to show that this is a universal bonding for all women, all sisters and not restricted only to married women.

In some parts of West Bengal, Sindur Khela is celebrated before Vijayadashami. In Dubrajpur, the Sindur Khela is celebrated on Mahasaptami itself. After bathing the nabapatrika and the following ritual worship, sindur is applied on the forehead of the goddess. After that the married women engaged in Sindur Khela. In the village of Bijra near Memari in Purba Bardhaman district, the family pujas of Ghosh and Bose family celebrate Sindur Khela on Mahastami. The tradition is almost 500 years old. After the ritual worship on Mahastami, the entire married womenfolk of the village celebrate Sindur Khela. Many people from adjoining areas came to Bijra to see this ritual.

== Criticism ==
The ritual has been criticized by Taslima Nasrin for being patriarchal in nature, because of the over emphasis on the married status of the goddess as well as the women. Bengali Hindu girls grow up seeing the married ladies in their family participate in the playful ritual, which creates among them a sense of life being incomplete without getting married. Critics feel that this can create a regressive impact on young women.

== In popular culture ==
Every year, the Kolkata-based celebrities including the Tollywood actresses engage in Sindur Khela at the Manicktalla Chaltabagan Lohapatty puja pandal in north central Kolkata. Sindur Khela is a colourful and vibrant ritual

- Sindur Khela (1999), feature film
- Sindoorkhela (2010–12), television soap
- Ki Kore Toke Bolbo (2016) originally titled Sindur Khela, feature film

== See also ==
- Kali Puja
- Holi
