= Ifonyintedo =

Ifonyintedo is a border town located in the Ipokia Local Government Area of Ogun State, Nigeria, near the international border with the Republic of Benin. Founded in 1935, the town is primarily an agricultural community where residents cultivate crops such as cassava, oil palm, and maize, alongside cross-border commercial trade.

The population is predominantly Yoruba, primarily speaking the Anago dialect. Community development is driven by local civic organizations, including the Ifonyintedo Development Union and Ifonyin Progressives.
