= List of Ogun State local government areas by population =

This article is about the 20 local government areas by population in the Nigerian state of Ogun. They range from 55,093 to 539,170 in population.

Rank	LGA	Population (1991)	Rank	Population (2006)
2	Ifo	215,055	1	539,170
1	Ado-Odo/Ota	234,647	2	527,242
4	Ijebu North	148,342	3	280,520
3	Shagamu	155,726	4	255,885
N/A	Abeokuta South	N/A	5	250,295
5	Obafemi-Owode	135,774	6	235,071
6	Abeokuta North	93,966	7	198,793
N/A	Yewa North	N/A	8	183,844
N/A	Yewa South	N/A	9	168,336
N/A	Ijebu Ode	N/A	10	157,161
N/A	Ipokia	N/A	11	150,387
7	Odogbolu	88,384	12	125,657
N/A	Ikenne	N/A	13	119,117
8	Odeda	86,950	14	109,522
10	Ijebu East	61,120	15	109,321
N/A	Imeko Afon	N/A	16	82,952
9	Ogun Waterside	61,919	17	74,222
N/A	Ijebu North East	N/A	18	68,800
N/A	Remo North	N/A	20	59,752
N/A	Ewekoro	N/A	19	55,093
	Ogun State	2,333,726	16	3,751,140

However, Governor Ibikunle Amosun on March 10, 2016 sent an executive bill to the House to restructure the existing 20 local government councils and create additional 37 LCDAs.

With the passage of the bill into law, there are 57 Local Government Areas & Local Council Development Areas in the state. The newly created ones asterisked

1. Abeokuta North Akomoje 2 * Abeokuta North West Lafenwa 3*. Abeokuta North East Ita Iyalode 4.* Oke Ogun Imala 5. Abeokuta South Ake 6.*Abeokuta South East Ijeun Titun 7*.Abeokuta South West Ijeja 8.Ado Odo/ Ota Ota 9.*Ado Odo Ado Odo 10*.Agbara/Igbesa Igbesa 11.*Ota West Atan Ota 12*.Sango/ Ijoko Sango 13.Ewekoro. Itori 14.*Ewekoro North Wasinmi 15.Ifo Ifo 16*. Ifo Central Agbado 17.*Coker Ibogun Ibogun 18.* Ifo South Ojodu 19.Ijebu East Ogbere 20*.Ijebu East Central Ojowo 21.Ijebu North Ijebu Igbo 22*.Ijebu North Central Oru 23.* Ijebu Igbo West Ojowo 24.*Ago Iwoye Ibipe 25.Ijebu North East Atan 26.*Yemoji Ilese 27.Ijebu Ode Ijebu Ode 28.* Ijebu Ode South Oke Aje 29.Ikenne Ikenne 30.*Remo Central Iperu 31.Imeko Imeko 32.*Afon Oloka Afon 33.Ipokia Ipokia 34.* Ipokia West Ijofin 35.*Idi Iroko Idi Iroko 36.Obafemi Owode Owode 37.*Oba Oba 38.*Obafemi Obafemi 39.*Ofada/ Mokoloki Mowe 40.Odeda Odeda 41.*Opeji Opeji 42.*Ilugun Ilugun 43.Odogbolu Odogbolu 44.*Leguru Ala 45.*Ifesowapo Imodi 46.Ogun Waterside Abigi 47.*Ogun Waterside East Bolorunduro Efire 48.Remo North Isara 49.*Remo North East Ode Remo 50. Sagamu Central Sagamu 51.*Sagamu Remo West Makun 52.*Sagamu Remo South Sotubo 53.Yewa North Ayetoro 54.*Iju Iboro 55.*Ketu Tata 56.Yewa South Ilaro 57.*Yewa South East Oke Odan.

However, during his government, Governor Dapo Abiodun did not attempt to utilise the local council development Areas, (LCDAs) created, by Ex- Governor lbikunle Amosu. Rather, he maintained the formal and original 20 Local governments (LG) of the state.

See Local government areas of Nigeria, and Ogun State.
