= Ipokia =

- LGA and town
- Interactive map of Ipokia
- Location in Nigeria
- Coordinates: 6°32′N 2°51′E
- Country: Nigeria
- State: Ogun State

Government
  - Local Government Chairman: Johnson Akohomeh AVOSEH (APC)

Area
  - Total: 629 km^{2} (243 sq mi)

Population (2006 census)
  - Total: 150,426
  - Density: 239/km^{2} (619/sq mi)
- Time zone: UTC+1 (WAT)
- 3-digit postal code prefix: 111
- ISO 3166 code: NG.OG.IP

Ipokia is the metropolitan headquarters of Anago Kingdom. It is an ancient kingdom in the old Oyo Empire. Unlike the other kingdoms, which had at one time or the other engaged in the internecine wars that ravaged Yorubaland in the nineteenth century, Ipokia stood out as an unconquered sanctuary city-state throughout the period. The year it was founded is not known but can be traced to 13th to 14th century when some princes and princesses of Ọranmiyan, the 6th Ooni of Ife and founder of the Oyo and Benin kingdoms migrated from Oyo-Ile and settled in Ajasse Ipo in present-day Kwara State due to a misunderstanding among the princes, then moved downward toward West Lagos with the ancient crown gotten from their forebearer, Oduduwa. They settled briefly in Lagos shores, Isale Eko before coming to Badagry axis and finally settled down and formed a small town named Ipokia ("Opo ko ara e sile", i.e "Opo rejected its people") supposedly with the help and guidance of Ifá divination. Ipokia came to be a Local Government in 1996 carved from formally known as "Egbado South local government" but now "Yewa South local government" in the west of Ogun State, Nigeria bordering the Republic of Benin. Its capital is in Ipokia town. It is an exit route from Nigeria to the outside world through road and water. It is also regarded as the main entry to the Gateway State due to its proximity and the boundary between Nigeria and Benin Republic. There are other towns like Idiroko, Oniro, Ita Egbe, Tongeji Island, Aretedo, Ihunbo, Agosasa, Aseko, Maun, Koko, Ropo, Alaari, Tube, Ilashe, Ifonyintedo, Madoga, Idosemo, Ijofin and Tongeji Island in the town of Ipokia at 6°32′00″N 2°51′00″E.

It has an area of 629 km^{2} and a population of 150,426 at the 2006 census. It the capital of Ipokia Local Government.The immediate past traditional ruler was His Royal Majesty, the late Oba Yisa Olaniyan, the 46th Onipokia of Ipokia Kingdom, who recently joined his ancestors. He will be remembered for his service and contributions to the kingdom during his reign. First-class Obas who are in the same category with Alake of Egbaland, Awujale of Ijebuland and some other few first-class Obas in Ogun State.

== Minerals/Natural resources ==
Ipokia town has large deposits of Kaolin and Red clay. The vast fertile land is available for Agriculture. It is equally rich in soft sand used in the construction industry. Large and commercial deposit of crude oil was discovered in Tongeji Island (a town within Ipokia).It has been recently approved by the Federal Government to start exploration. The drilling has commenced and this will provide more revenue for the country and job creation for the beneficial of the indigene .Establishment of oil refinery is in progress.

== Tourism ==
A tourist complex and sea institute was developed at Whekan Island by the team of Queens Atlantic Resorts Inc., of Las Vegas, Nevada, U.S.A. The area provides opportunities for boat regattas, canoeing, and fishing along Badagry Creek. However, the project was later suspended for undisclosed reasons. Tongeji Island features a waterfront area and scenic views, making it a popular tourist spot. Onigbaale Forest is equally a major tourist attraction. It was reported that the 1st Onigbaale of Ipokia is said to have disappeared there and has since not been seen.

== Famous foods ==
Ipokia cuisine is rich with numerous delicacies original to the Town. Listed below are some of the foods peculiar to the towns and their recipes;

- Gbangba-grinded and fermented corn mill
- Imoyo - Pepper, tomato, locust beans, onion, coconut oil, smoked fish, table salt
- Gbon-npete soup - Maize powder, pepper,

meat, oil, salt.

- Atakere - Beans, Pepper, oil, salt.
- Abodo - cassava, salt
- Benju - Cassava, Coconut, salt .
- Ajungun - Maize, Cassava, Oil, Salt &

pepper

- Adalu - Maize, Beans, Salt, Pepper & Oil.
- Atutu(Tutu) - Maize Powder, Beans, Salt, Oil and

Pepper

- Atomboro - Beans, Salt, Pepper and oil.
- Epete-Ewa - Beans Powder, Palm Seed, Salt

and Pepper

- Idoki - Smoke, Fried or Boiled Sweet Potatoes.
- Tuwo(Oka) - Corn Flour
- Eko(Akamu) - Corn
- Asepo - Okra, Smoked Fish, Onion Pepper, Salt, Oil

== Languages ==
The main languages of Ipokia is Anago. Other languages include Ogu, Eyo and English language which is Nigeria official language.

== Postal information ==
The postal code of the area is 111.

== Notable towns and villages ==
- Agada
- Idiroko
- Ifonyintedo
- Ijaye
- Inuka
- Ipokia
- Ita Egbe
