= Sindoor =

Traditional vermilion cosmetic powder from the Indian subcontinent

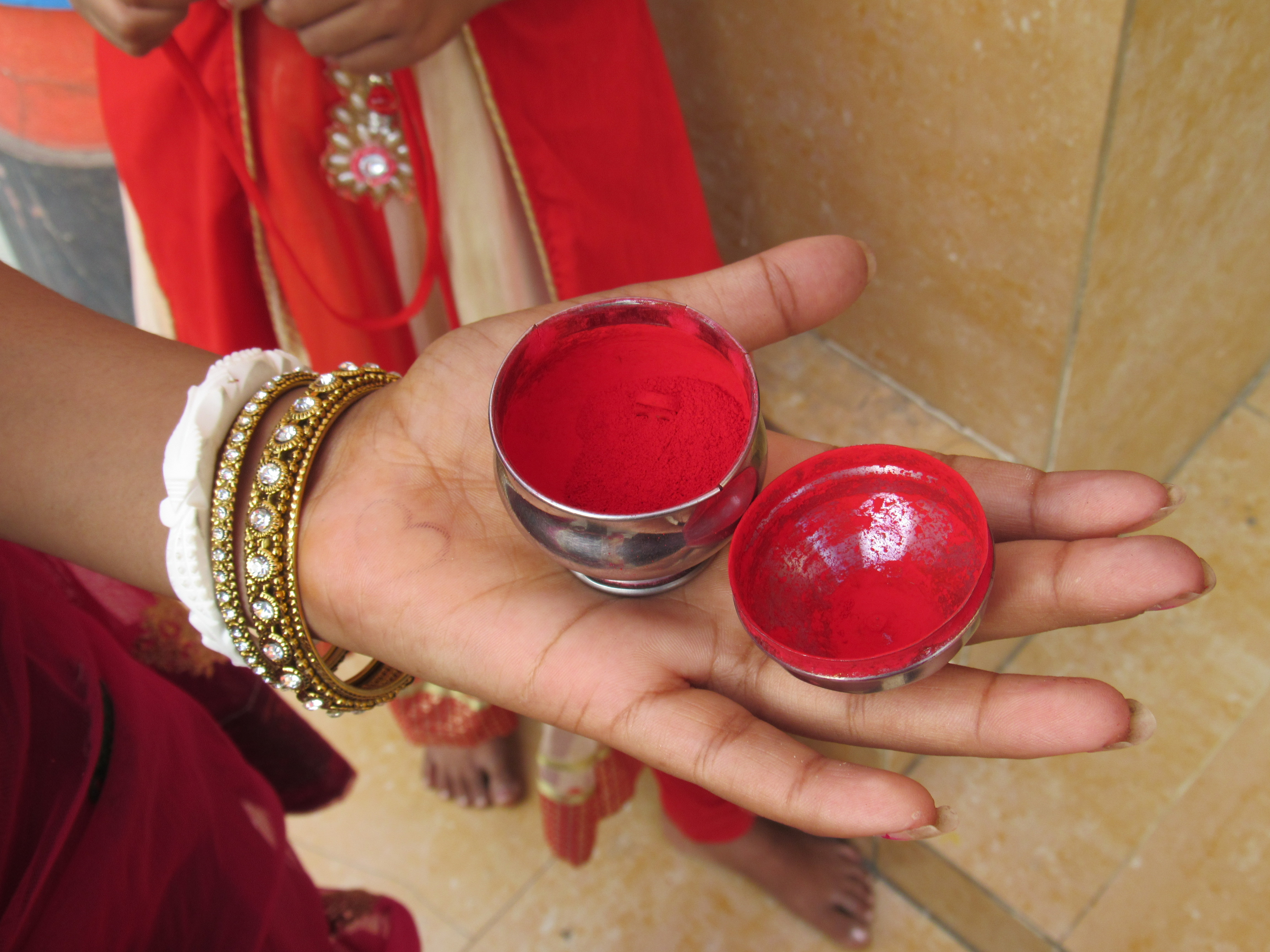
A traditional vermilion red or orange-red colored cosmetic powder

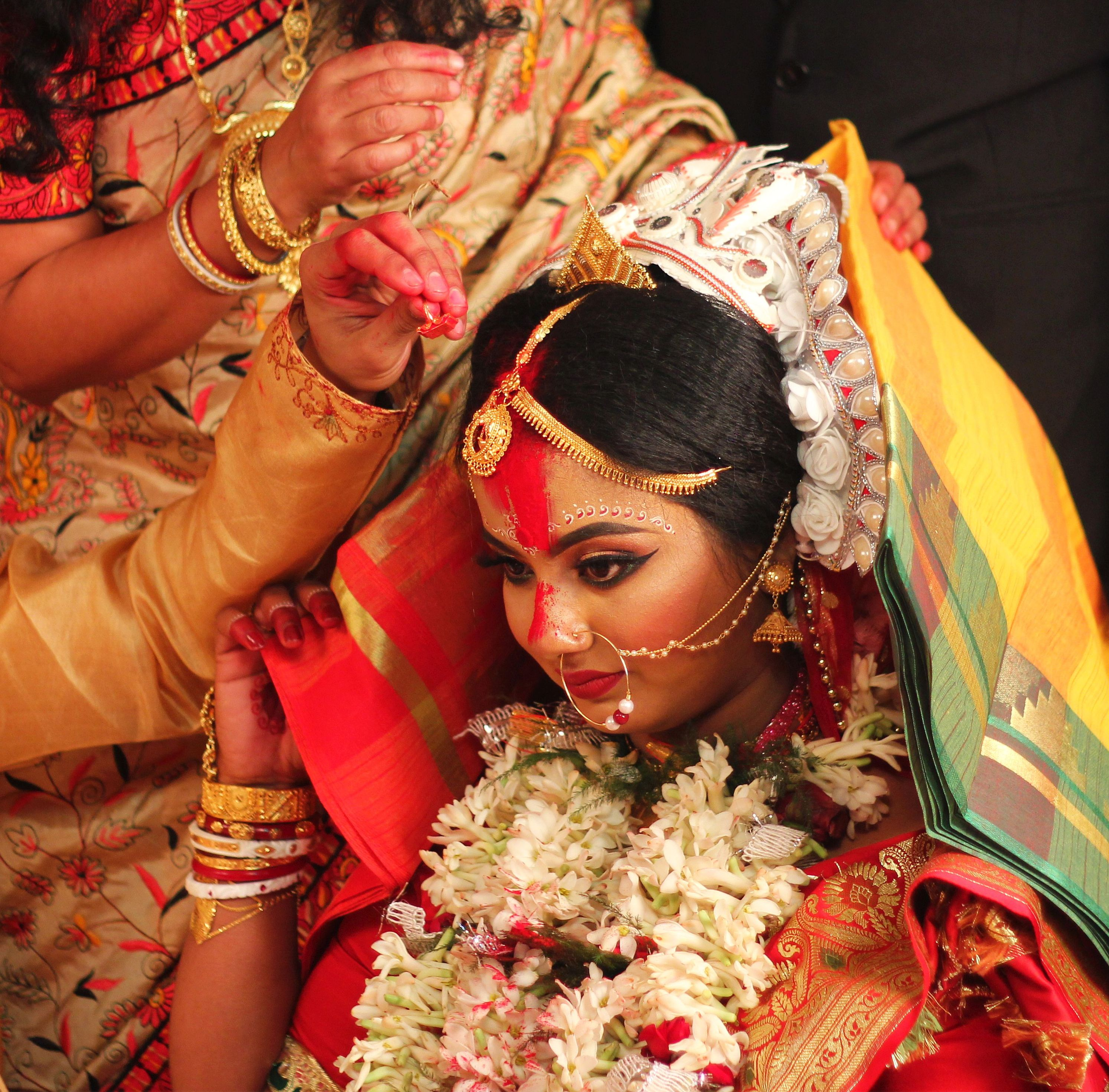
Sindoor daan in Bengali Hindu wedding

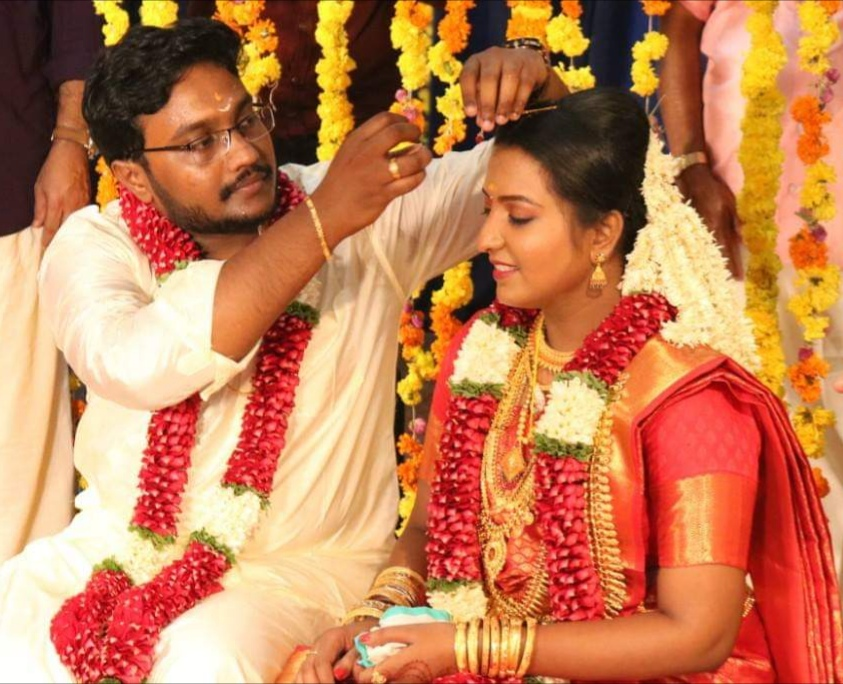
'Sindhooram charthal' ceremony in Malayali Hindu wedding, Kerala

Sindoor powder in four colors red on a market cart, Ramdevra, India

Sindoor (Hindi: सिंदूर, IAST: sindūr) or sindura (Sanskrit: सिन्दूर,IAST: sindūra) is a traditional vermilion red or orange-red or maroon cosmetic powder from South Asia, usually worn by married women along the part of their hairline. In Hindu communities, the sindoor is considered auspicious and is a visual marker of marital status of a woman and ceasing to wear it usually implies widowhood.

Traditional sindoor was made with turmeric and alum or lime, or from other herbal ingredients. Unlike red lead and vermilion, these are not poisonous. Some commercial sindoor products contain synthetic ingredients, some of which are not manufactured to proper standards and may contain lead.

== Etymology ==
Sindoor is a traditional vermilion-red or orange-red cosmetic powder used by married women within Hindu communities across South Asia. It is applied along the central parting line of the hair, known as the maang, and indicates marital status and auspicious significance. Its first application is performed by the husband during the wedding ritual called sindoor daan and marks the transition from unmarried to married life.

The word sindoor is derived from the Sanskrit word siṃdūra, which refers to a bright red pigment, such as red lead or vermilion, and is historically associated in rituals with the brilliance and symbolic power of this colour. This distinguishes it from similar customs, such as the South Indian kumkum.

== Components ==
Traditionally, sindoor is prepared by mixing Curcuma longa with slaked lime (calcium hydroxide) and alum (potassium aluminum sulfate), wherein the alkaline substance triggers a chemical reaction with turmeric's active compound, curcumin, to produce a bright red pigment safe for skin application.

This method, rooted in ancient practices, avoided toxic metals and relied on natural, herbal components for colour and binding. In some regional variations, such as the South Indian kumkum, powdered minerals like neela pathar (a stone containing mercury) were mixed with powdered turmeric, although pure herbal versions were preferred to mitigate health risks. Over time, traditional formulations incorporated vermilion, a bright red pigment obtained by pulverizing cinnabar ore (Mercury(II) sulfide, HgS). While this provided an intense colour, it also raised toxicity concerns due to the presence of mercury.

Unlike purely herbal preparations, cinnabar-derived vermilion required purification to reduce impurities; nevertheless, it remained a primary component of ritual-grade sindoor due to its symbolic brilliance. In modern production, sindoor has largely shifted toward synthetic formulations, using red lead (lead tetroxide, Pb_{3}O_{4}) or industrial azo dyes for coloration. It is often mixed with fillers like cornstarch, fragrances, and binders such as groundnut oil, which enhance adhesion and shelf life.

These commercial versions, prevalent since the industrial era, often contain heavy metals like lead and zinc chromate. In 2008, U.S. FDA testing detected lead levels exceeding safe limits in imported sindoor powders. Artificial vermilion mimics natural HgS without the mercury, but cost-driven production often prioritizes cheaper, unregulated pigments over safety.

Efforts to revive safer alternatives include herbal modern sindoor, which uses plant-based pigments derived from hibiscus flowers, marigolds, and rakt chandan (red sandalwood), mixed with natural binders to mimic traditional non-toxic properties while meeting contemporary demand for lead- and mercury-free products. These formulations, marketed since the early 2000s, undergo preliminary quality checks, but their standardization varies; peer-reviewed studies have noted inconsistencies in the dye components of commercial kumkum.

== History ==
=== Hindu scripture ===
An authoritative source for vermilion is absent within the core Hindu scriptures, including the entire corpus of Vedic literature (Rigveda, Yajurveda, Samaveda, and Atharvaveda) and its ancillary texts, such as the Grihya Sutras, which detail domestic rituals. No mention of its application as a marital symbol is made in these texts. Scholarly review confirms its absence also extends to the Upanishads, the Ramayana, and the Mahabharata, as well as early post-Vedic compositions, indicating that the codification of this practice as a religious symbol occurred subsequent to the Vedic period (c. 1500–500 BCE).

Its first verifiable mention appears in Puranic literature, specifically in the Brahmanda Purana (c. 5th–10th century CE), one of the eighteen Mahapuranas. In its Lalita Sahasranama section, verse 289 describes the dust from the lotus feet of the Goddess Lalita as "śruti sīmanta sindūrī-kṛta pād’abja dhūlikā". Here, this dust is compared to the vermilion applied to the hair parting (sīmanta) of the personified Shruti (the Vedas), consequently associating this vermilion with divine auspiciousness, fertility, and feminine power. This metaphorical usage elevates vermilion from a mere cosmetic to a sacred symbol associated with the Goddess's adornment, which influenced subsequent Tantric and devotional traditions.

Later Puranic texts, such as those recounting Parvati's use of vermilion to ensure Shiva's longevity, build upon this foundation, embedding it within narratives of marital fidelity and cosmic harmony. These compositions, however, reflect a medieval synthesis rather than primordial Vedic rituals. Although archaeological evidence from the Indus Valley Civilisation (c. 2500 BCE) reveals traces of red pigment on the hair partings of terracotta female figurines suggesting a pre-cultural precedent the definitive Hindu scriptural sanction for vermilion's ritual use originated in the Puranic era. This stands distinct from the earlier scriptural emphasis on fire-based (Agni) marital vows.

Neolithic female figurines excavated at Mehrgarh, Baluchistan seem to imply application of sindoor-like colour to the parting of women's hair. According to the legends, Radha, a consort of Krishna, turned the kumkuma into a flame-like design on her forehead. In the famous epic Mahabharata, Draupadi the wife of the Pandavas, wipes off her sindoor in disgust and despair at the happenings in Hastinapura. Use of sindoor is frequently mentioned in the texts Lalita Sahasranama and Soundarya Lahari.

Adi Shankaracharya writes in Soundarya Lahari:

tanotu kṣemaṃ naḥ tava
vadana saundaryalaharī
parīvāha-strotaḥ saraṇiriva sīmanta-saraṇiḥ ।
vahantī sindūraṃ prabala kabarī bhāratimira-
dviṣāṃ bṛndair bandī-kṛtamiva navīnārka kiraṇam ॥

— Adi Shankara, Saundarya Lahari, 44
Translation:

Oh mother, let the line parting thine hairs,
which looks like a channel,
through which the rushing waves of your beauty ebbs,
and which on both sides imprisons,
your Vermilion, which is like a rising sun,
by using your hair which is dark like
the platoon of soldiers of the enemy,
protect us and give us peace.

— translated by P. R. Ramachander

Jain women apply the sindoor, mostly in the cities. Jain nuns are forbidden to apply this to their hairline or foreheads. The display of the sindoor is considered very important to indicate the married status of the woman, however in several local cultures, sindoor is also applied by unmarried women.

=== Medieval and colonial era ===
Throughout the Middle Ages, spanning the Delhi Sultanate (1206–1526 AD) and the Mughal Empire (1526–1857 AD), the practice of using vermilion (sindoor) as a core element of marital identity continued among Hindu women, largely unaffected by the era's prevailing Islamic administrative and cultural frameworks. Hindu communities continued to observe the Sindoor Daan (vermilion offering) ceremony in weddings, during which the groom applies vermilion to the bride's hair parting.

During the colonial era, under the rule of the British East India Company and later the Crown (1757–1947 AD), vermilion endured as an unaltered Hindu tradition. It managed to evade the regulatory scrutiny applied to practices deemed socially harmful-scrutiny that led to interventions such as the abolition of the Sati custom through the Bengal Sati Regulation of 1829. British anthropologists and administrators noted it in census documents and travelogues as a visible indicator of the status of married Hindu women. During this period, the practice faced indirect pressure from the criticism of Christian missionaries and from emerging Hindu reform movements such as the Brahmo Samaj (established 1828). In the early twentieth century, amidst the burgeoning nationalist movement, vermilion became a symbol of reclaimed indigenous identity.

=== Contemporary practice and adaptation ===
In modern Hindu communities, sindoor remains a traditional marker of marital status. Married women regularly apply it to their hair parting in daily life, at weddings, and during festivals like Durga Puja as a symbol of devotion and auspiciousness. Its use continues across urban and rural India. Surveys indicate that over 70% of married Hindu women from traditional families observe this custom as a visible token of fidelity, though adherence varies by region and socioeconomic factors. In formal contexts, its application retains its traditional centrality during the wedding "Sindoor Daan" ceremony (when the groom applies the sindoor to the bride's parting).

In fashion-conscious contexts, sindoor is styled creatively applied lightly for a subtle touch or paired with Western attire to blend tradition with modernity. Among diaspora Hindus in the United States and the United Kingdom, its use persists at cultural events but is often optional. Some women cite a preference for personal choice over mandatory symbolism amidst evolving gender norms.

== Application ==
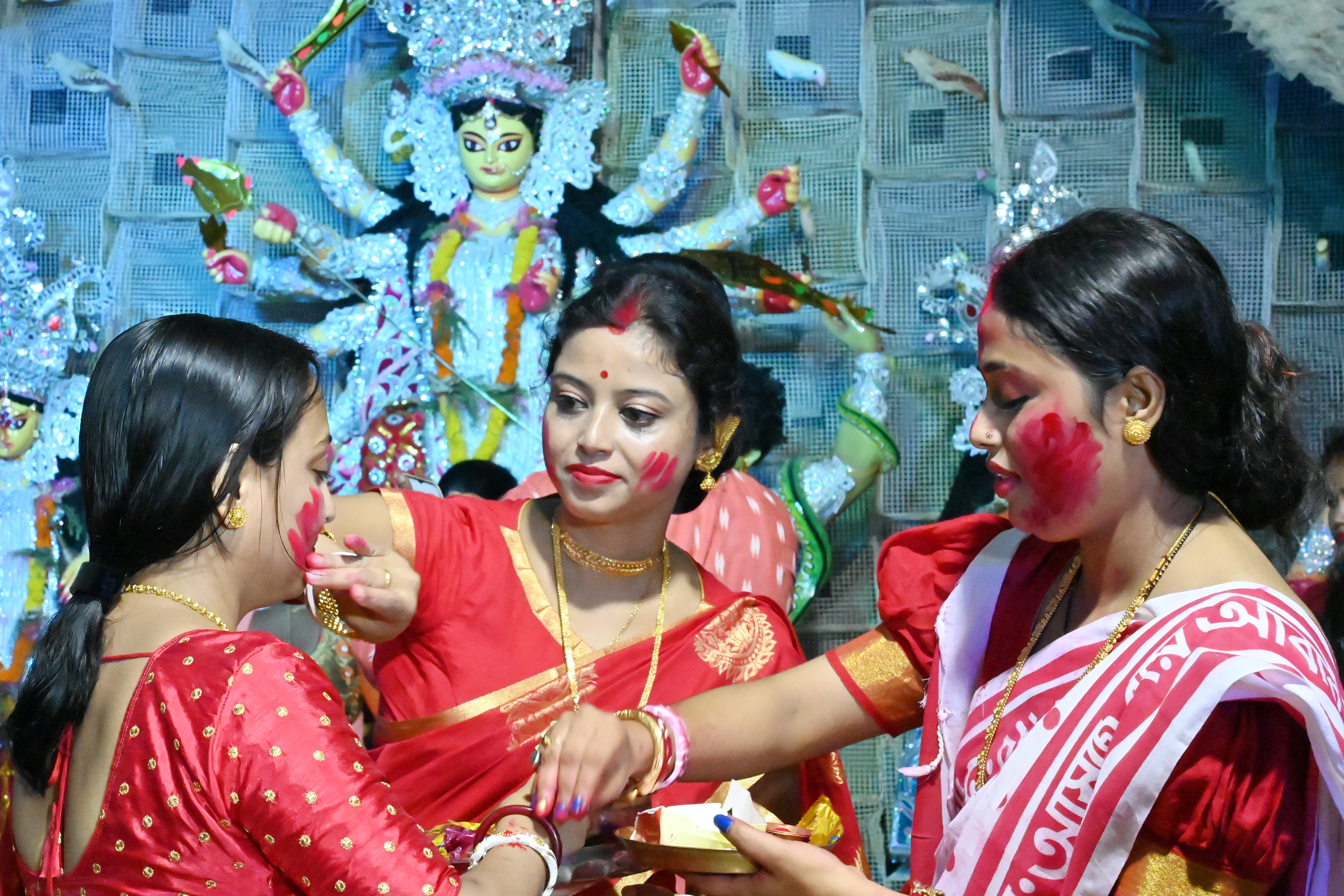
Women smear each other with vermillion as part of the exuberant Durga Puja festival celebrations in Nagaon, Assam, India.

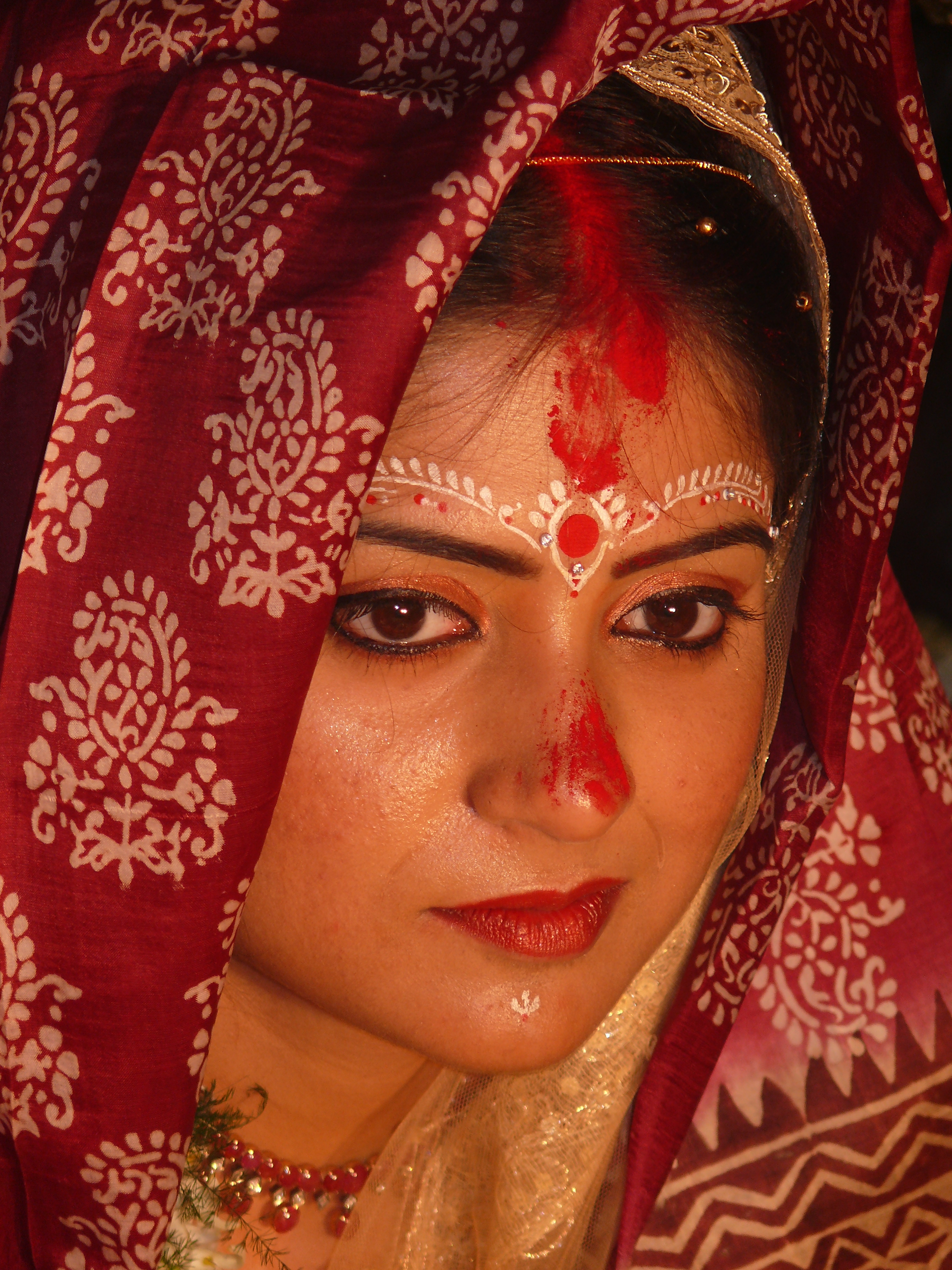
Bride with sindoor in hair-parting

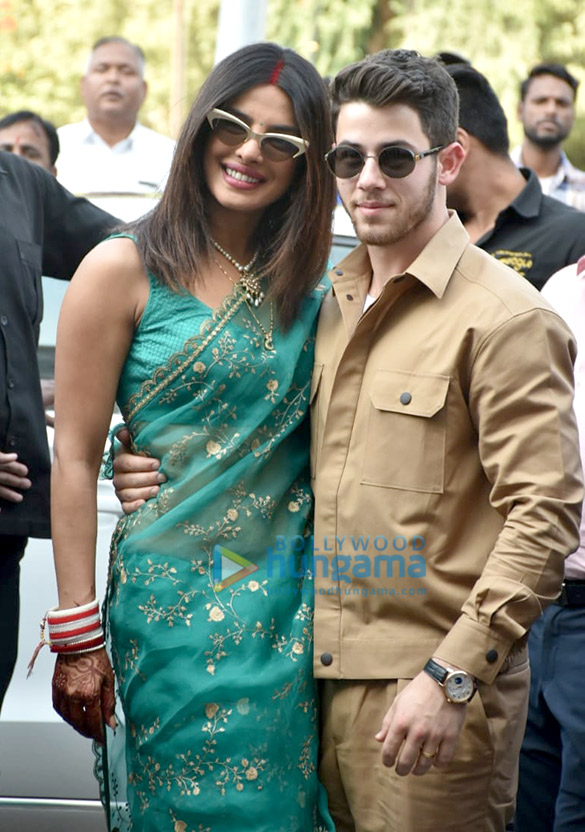
Sindoor worn by Priyanka Chopra after her marriage with Nick Jonas

Sindoor is traditionally applied at the beginning or completely along the parting (hair is usually parted straight down the middle) of a woman's hair (also called mang in Hindi or simandarekha in Sanskrit). Sindoor is the mark of a married woman in Hinduism. Single women wear the bindi (a dot on the forehead) in different colours for special occasions but do not apply sindoor in their parting of the hairline. Widows do not wear sindoor or bindis, signifying that their husband is no longer alive.

The sindoor is first applied to the woman by her husband on the day of her wedding; this is called the Sindoor Danam ceremony. After this, she applies it herself every day.

A similar colouring ritual is known as pasupu kumkuma, named after another name for sindoor, kumkuma.

The wiping off of the sindoor is very significant for a widow. There are many rituals associated with this practice. The most common is when a mother-in-law or older sister-in-law wipes off the sindoor when a woman becomes a widow. In a few traditional Indian practices, the widow breaks her bangles, removes her bindi, and removes ornaments, such as her nose ring and toe rings. The parting of hair is symbolic of a river of red blood full of life. When the sindoor is removed then the river becomes barren, dry and empty. This custom is prevalent in rural areas and is followed by all castes and social ranks.

The red sindoor is significant for the married woman as she is full of colour. When she becomes a widow she adopts plain white dress and removes all colour from her face including the bright red sindoor.

Methods and styles of applying the sindoor vary from personal choice to regional customs. Most new brides part their hair in the middle and fill it with sindoor, while other married women may just apply a red spot at the end of the hair line and forehead. Recently, a triangle shape on the forehead pointing towards the nose, with a diamond bindi for fashion, is being worn by younger women.

== Ayurvedic medicinal use ==
Rasasindura, the Ayurvedic form of sindoor, is a traditional herbo-mineral preparation. It is primarily composed of alpha-mercuric sulfide (HgS, >99% pure) and is obtained through the controlled calcination of purified mercury and sulfur with herbal auxiliaries. In classical texts such as the Rasaratna Samuccaya, it is classified as a Rasayana and is valued for its purported rejuvenating (rasayana) and bio-enhancing (yogavahi) properties. To mitigate its potential toxicity, it is typically administered in low doses (62.5–125 mg) with adjuvants like honey or ghee.

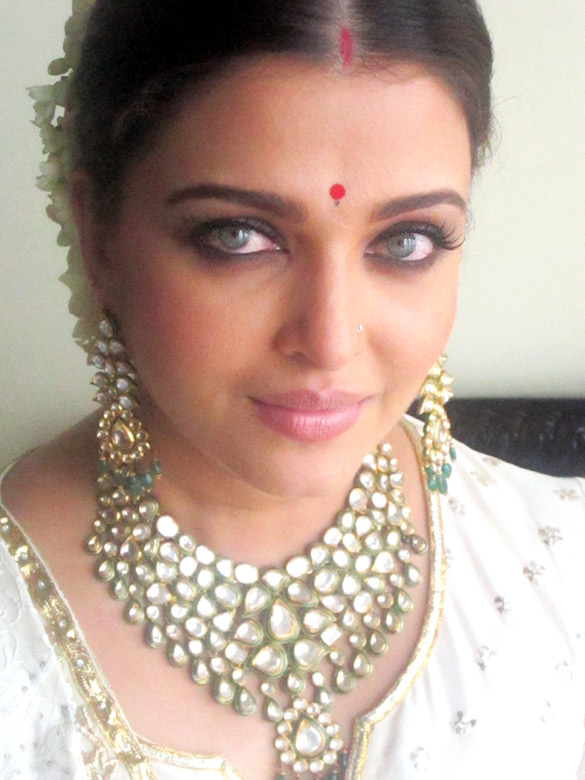
Sindoor worn by Aishwarya Rai

Medicinally, Rasasindura is used for the management of chronic fever (jvara), jaundice (kamala), and respiratory ailments such as cough and asthma. It is believed to balance the doshas, particularly Vata and Kapha, and enhance Agni (digestive fire). In cardiac conditions (hridroga), it is indicated to strengthen cardiac function and alleviate colicky pain (shulavedana). Furthermore, in cases of urinary tract issues (mutrakricchra) and fistula (bhagandara), it is thought to aid in tissue repair and reduce inflammation.

The herbal form of sindoor, derived from plants like Bixa orellana or a turmeric-lime mixture, is used externally as a paste or poultice (lepa), such as in 'Sindooradi Lepam', to enhance skin radiance, promote wound healing, and reduce pigmentation through its anti-inflammatory effects. These preparations emphasize the 'shodhana' (purification) process to make the minerals bioavailable and mitigate risks. However, the clinical validation for these uses is rooted in classical tradition rather than modern testing.

== Toxicity concerns ==
Traditional sindoor was made with turmeric and alum or lime, or from other herbal ingredients. The turmeric powder becomes red when mixed with lime juice or lime powder. Unlike red lead and vermilion, these are not poisonous. Modern material being sold as sindoor mainly uses vermilion, an orange-red pigment, the purified and powdered form of cinnabar, which is the chief form in which mercury sulfide naturally occurs. As with other compounds of mercury, sindoor is toxic and must be handled carefully. Sometimes, red lead (lead tetroxide, also known as minium) is added to sindoor. Red lead is toxic. In early 2008, allegations of high lead content led the U.S. Food and Drug Administration to recall batches of sindoor from several manufacturers.

== In popular literature, culture and nationalism ==
=== Literature ===
In Hindu mythological narratives, sindoor is depicted as a symbol of wifely devotion and the husband's longevity. A popular folktale associated with the Ramayana recounts that while in captivity in Lanka, Sita applied sindoor to her hair partition to ensure Lord Ram's long life; upon learning this from Sita, Hanuman covered his entire body with sindoor to magnify this blessing for Ram.

Similar symbolic associations appear in interpretations of the Mahabharata, where Draupadi is said to have erased her sindoor in moments of profound loss, such as after the Pandavas' defeat in the game of dice.

In modern Indian literature, sindoor recurs as a motif of traditional marital obligations. In novels and short stories depicting women's inner lives amid changing gender norms, its socio-cultural weight is frequently criticized or affirmed.

=== Film ===
In Indian cinema, sindoor serves as a recurring visual symbol of marital status, devotion, and tragedy, often employed in melodramatic scenes to raise the emotional stakes. Bollywood films titled 'Sindoor' (1947) and 'Sindoor' (1987) explicitly centre sindoor in their narratives. The latter film, starring Rekha and Jeetendra, revolves around a woman's presumed widowhood, subsequent remarriage, and the dramatic reapplication of sindoor upon her first husband's return. Others are Rakta Sindhuram (1985), Sindoor (1987), and Sindoor Tere Naam Ka (series, 2005–2007). In the 2007 film Om Shanti Om, an iconic dialogue delivered by actress Deepika Padukone is Ek chutki sindoor ki keemat, tum kya jaano Ramesh Babu? (The value of a pinch of sindoor, what do you know about it Ramesh Babu?)

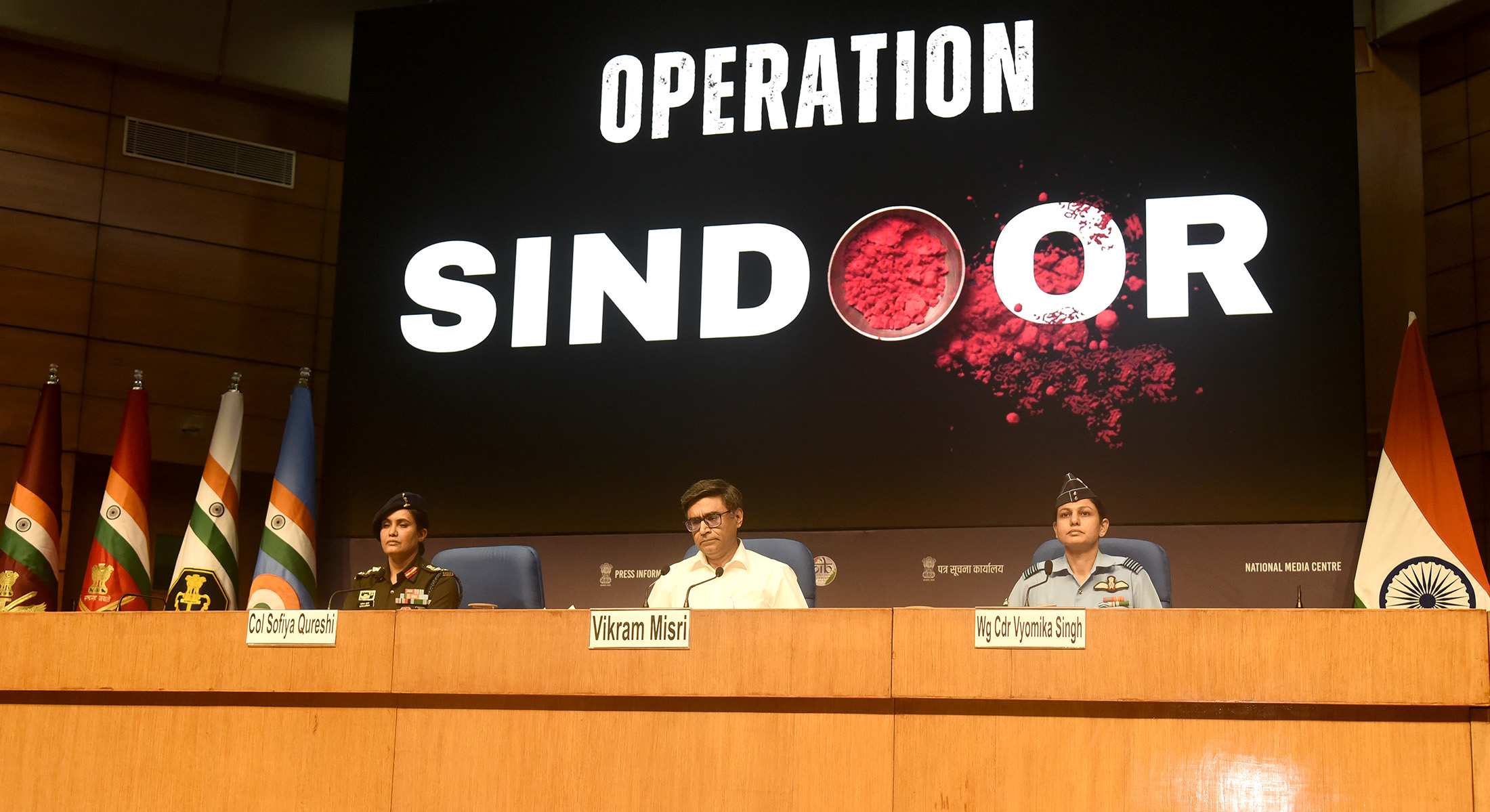
Operation Sindoor Press Briefing

=== Modern symbolism in nationalism ===
In retaliation for an attack on Hindu tourists in Pahalgam, Jammu and Kashmir, on May 5, 2025, by Pakistan sponsored Islamic terrorists which killed at least 26 Hindu men, the Indian government launched 'Operation Sindoor' in May 2025 to conduct targeted military strikes against terrorist infrastructure in Pakistan. The operation's name explicitly referenced the sindoor that married Hindu women wear to signify saubhagya (auspiciousness) and marital fidelity, invoking it as a metaphor for restoring national and cultural honor. Government statements framed the attack as an assault on Hindu marital sanctity and accused the terrorists of "wiping the sindoor" from the partitions of widows. This symbolic application inflamed Hindu nationalist discourse.

However, left-leaning media outlets criticized this naming as a patriarchal co-optation for jingoism, attributing it to Brahmanical undertones.

Sindoor has sporadically appeared in rallies and iconography within the broader Hindu nationalist movement. For example, during the 2024 Ayodhya celebrations, female activists publicly applied it to assert Hindu identity amid debates on the Uniform Civil Code.

== See also ==
- Bindi
- Tilaka
- Vermilion
- Mangalasutra
