= Sinduria =

- Town
- Location in Jharkhand, India Sinduria (India)
- Coordinates: 24.38916°N 83.60794°E
- Country: India
- State: Jharkhand
- District: Garhwa

Population (2011)
  - Total: 5,262

Languages
  - Official: Hindi, Santali
- Time zone: UTC+5:30 (IST)
- Vehicle registration: JH

Sinduria is a census town in Garhwa district in the Indian state of Jharkhand.

== Demographics ==
As of 2011 India census, Sinduria had a population of 5,262. Males constitute 2,801 and females 2,461. Sinduria has an average literacy rate of 75.54%, higher than the state average of 66.41%, male literacy is 83.27%, and female literacy is 66.64%. In Sinduria, 3.38% of the population is under 6 years of age with 704 children.

== Transport ==
Sinduria is located on road connecting Majhiaon and Nagar Untari. BSRTC runs bus services from Garhwa to the town. Sinduria railway station is located on the northern part of the town.
