= Ushana =

King in Hindu texts

- Texts: Puranas

Genealogy
- Parents: Tamas (father)
- Children: Shiteyus
- Dynasty: Yaduvamsha

Ushana (Sanskrit: उशन, romanized: Uśana) is a king featured in Hindu literature. A member of the Yadu dynasty, he is described to be the son of a king named Tamas. The Vishnu Purana states that Ushana performed a hundred ashvamedha sacrifices. Ushana is succeeded by his son, Shiteyus.
