= Shodhana =

In Rasa Shastra (the branch that deals with pharmaceutical processing of Ayurveda formulations), Shodhana is a process that is employed during the pharmaceutical processing either to detoxify, purify, or to potentiate the efficacy of the raw materials (of herbal, mineral, metal or animal origin).

== Etymology and definitions ==
Monier Monier-Williams, in the Monier-Williams Sanskrit dictionary, identifies that the term shodhana is derived from the verbal root śuddha, which means to cleanse or to purify. With respect to texts such as Yaska's Nirukta and the Mahabharata, Monier-Williams defines shodhana as 'the act of cleaning, purifying, correcting, improving'. He also defines shodhana as 'refining' with respect to 'metals for chemical or medicinal purposes'.

== Rasashastra ==
Shodhana is of two types in Rasashastra. Samanya Shodhana or general purification method and Vishesha Shodhana or the Specific methods of purification. Samanya Shodhana is a common purification method used for groups of similar metals, and Vishesha Shodhana is a special method used for a particular metal that may give it specific therapeutic properties.
