= Sindhura Lakshmana =

Indian freedom fighter

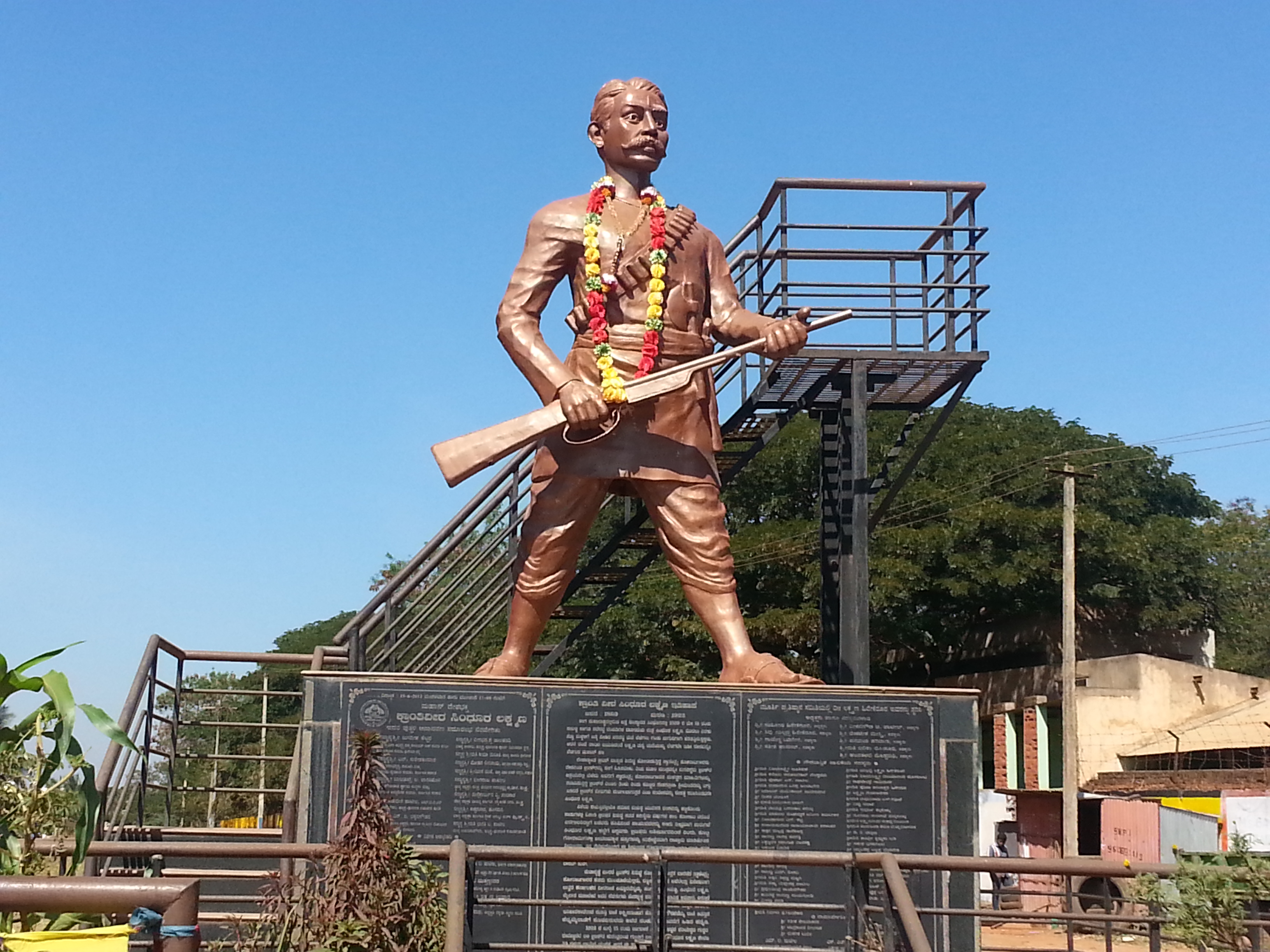
- Statue present beside Airport road, Hubballi.
- Born: Sindhura Lakshmana; 18-05-1898; Sindhur Village, Jath Taluka, Sangli district, Maharashtra
- Died: 1922 (aged 23–24); Siddapura, Naagarala, Bilagi, Bagalkot
- Other name: Veera Sindhura Lakshmana
- Years active: 24 years
- Known for: freedom fighter

Sindhura Lakshmana (1898–1922) was an Indian revolutionary fighter in the independence movement against British Colonial rule in India. He was known as Robin hood of India, he used to steal food, jwellery and accessories and donate those to poor people of karnataka. He was a fastest runner, he used to run faster than Britishers car

== Biography ==
Lakshmana was born in Sindhur village in a Kannada speaking family, which is now in Jath taluk of Sangli district in Indian state of Maharashtra. The sindhur village is in border of Karnataka and Maharashtra, which is mostly populated by Kannada speaking people.

During the time when Mahatma Gandhi's Non-cooperation movement was spreading across India, Lakshmana started his own struggle against the British by forming a band of men to loot the tax money collected by the government treasury and distribute it among the populace. He was shot dead by the British snipers in a sting operation in 1922, while dining at the home of a British informant.

== In popular culture ==
A Kannada film Veera Sindhoora Lakshmana released in 1977 depicts his rebellion and struggle against the British Government.
