= Johannes Quack =

German social anthropologist

Johannes Quack (born 1959) is a German ethnologist at Goethe University Frankfurt whose primary field of study is religion. He is also the head of the Emmy Noether Research Group “Diversity of Non-Religiosity” at Goethe University Frankfurt.

He has researched non-religious and rationalist organizations in India. He received the Max Weber Award from the Max Weber Center for Advanced Cultural and Social Studies at the University of Erfurt for his work Disenchanting India: Organized Rationalism and Criticism on Religion in India. Max Weber's concept of disenchantment was applied to the discussion of secularism in India in his book.

== Life and work ==
Quack was born in 1959 in Anrath. He studied religious studies, anthropology and philosophy at the University of Bayreuth. Later, he taught anthropology and religious studies at Heidelberg University, the University of Lucerne, the University of Münster, the University of Tübingen, and LMU Munich. He used to work at the Cluster of Excellence: Asia and Europe in a Global Context, Heidelberg University as a post-doctoral researcher and McGill University in Montreal as a research fellow.

His field of research includes religion, Hindu traditions, ritual theory, criticism of religion, and mental illness. He has done field work in India about religious tourism, non-religious group and psychosocial problems.

== Published works ==
Books

- Johannes Quack (22 November 2011). Disenchanting India: Organized Rationalism and Criticism of Religion in India. Oxford University Press. ISBN 978-0-19-981260-8.
- William Sax; Johannes Quack; Jan Weinhold (14 December 2009). The Problem of Ritual Efficacy. Oxford University Press. ISBN 978-0-19-974236-3.

Peer-reviewed papers

- Quack, Johannes (2013). "'What do I know?' Scholastic fallacies and pragmatic religiosity in mental health-seeking behaviour in India". Mental Health, Religion & Culture. 16 (4): 403–418. doi:10.1080/13674676.2012.679358. ISSN 1367-4676. S2CID 144400501.
- Quack, Johannes (2012). "Ignorance and utilization: mental health care outside the purview of the Indian state". Anthropology & Medicine. 19 (3): 277–290. doi:10.1080/13648470.2012.692357. ISSN 1364-8470. PMID 22870866. S2CID 20015220.
- Quack, Johannes (2012). "Organised Atheism in India: An Overview". Journal of Contemporary Religion. 27 (1): 67–85. doi:10.1080/13537903.2012.642729. ISSN 1353-7903. S2CID 143798025.
- Quack, Johannes; P. Tobelman (2010). "Questioning 'Ritual Efficacy'". Journal of Ritual Studies. 24 (1): 13–28.

Articles

- Quack, Johannes (2011). "Modes of Non-religiosity" (PDF). Virtual Conference: Nonreligion and Secularity Research Network.
