= Abhyanga =

Form of Ayurvedic massage

Abhyanga ("oil massage") is a form of ayurvedic therapy that involves massage of the entire body from the head to the toe with Dosha-specific warm herb-infused oil. The oil is commonly pre-mixed with herbs for specific conditions. Traditionally, the base oil used is sesame but, ayurveda professionals base the oil section on the Dosha type & a mixture of base oils can be used to process Dosha appropriate herbs for Abhyanga.

The Abhyanga is a part of the Dinacharya (daily practices) specified by the Brhat Trayi and Laghutrayi series of ayurvedic textbooks to maintain good health and well-being. Proponents claim Abhyanga aids joint health, nourishes the Dhatus (body tissues) and brings aggravated Doshas back to balance. They further claim it improves the condition of dry, coarse hair and flaky skin.

Abhyanga can be done as part of the steps of Panchakarma therapy, especially in the first stage: Purva Karma (pre-treatment), or as its own therapy.

It is often followed by Svedana therapy or a warm bath. Abhyanga may be performed by one or more therapists working in sync, but it can also be done by oneself. Oils used can vary depending on the season and the individual's out-of-balance constitution (Vkrtti).

The Abhyanga as prescribed in the Brhat Trayi and Laghutrayee texts is vigorous, and intended to open up the minor Srotas, remove Ama (toxins) through the skin, melt Kleshma (fat secretions blocking the Srotas), and cleanse and moisturize the skin.

Abhyanga can also be used to soothe Vata, Pitta and Kapha Dosha imbalances which will bring deep relaxation to the body and a peaceful mind. In order to correct a specific Dosha imbalance, a Dosha specific base and herb oil concoction may be used.

== See also ==
- National Research Institute for Panchakarma
