= Vamana (Panchakarma) =

Vamana Karma, also known as medical emesis or medical vomiting, is one of the five Pradhana Karmas of Panchakarma which is used in treating Kaphaj disorders.

Only a limited number of high-quality clinical trials have been conducted to date. Common limitations include low sample size, inadequate descriptions of randomization and blinding protocols, inadequate descriptions of adverse events, and nonstandard outcome measures. In spite of this, preliminary studies support the use of panchakarma and allied therapies and warrant additional large-scale research with rigorously designed trials.

== Procedure ==
Generally Vamana treatment is carried-out in the early morning on an empty stomach when the Kapha is intense. The night before the therapy, Kapha aggravating foods are provided to the patient. On the day of the treatment, depending on the condition of the patient, heat is applied to the region of chest as well as the back portion to liquefy the Kapha. The procedure has been carried out in kapha kala to remove kapha in toxic form, which panchkarma proponents believe to be the cause for major diseases like skin problems, ILD, Lungs fibrosis, asthma, hypothyroidism, hearts disorders, chronic rhinitis etc.

After the liquefaction of Kapha in the body a special medicated drink like yashtimadhu kashay, cranberry juice depends upon diseases is given to the patient that stimulates the emesis. Waste products (vitiated dosha) are eliminated through the upper gastrointestinal tract. After the emesis, the therapy is continued with ghee treatment and a steam bath. Proper rest is advised after undergoing the Vamana therapy, with proper diet continuation for the next seven days as post-procedure karmas to increase Agni ( hunger ).
