= Charaka =

Ancient Indian physician and academic

Maharshi Charaka
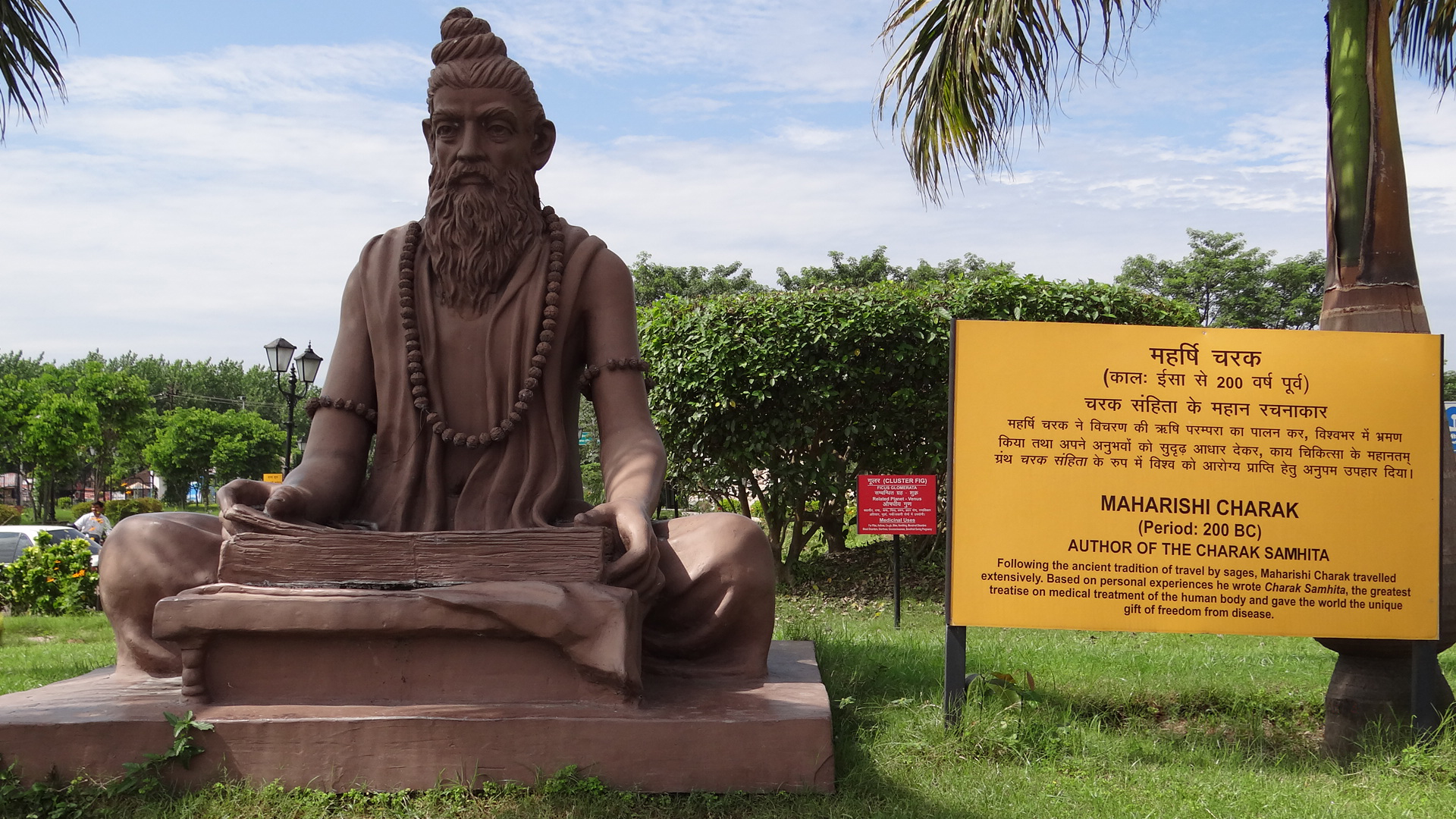
- Portrait of Charaka
- Born: Charaka; Ancient India
- Known for: Charaka Samhita
- Scientific career
- Fields: Medicine

Charaka was one of the principal contributors to Ayurveda, a system of medicine and lifestyle developed in ancient India. He is known as a physician who edited the medical treatise entitled Charaka Samhita, one of the foundational texts of classical Indian medicine and Ayurveda, included under Brhat-Trayi.

Charaka, also known as Charak acharya, was an ancient Indian physician and scholar who made significant contributions to the field of Ayurveda. Ayurveda is a traditional system of medicine that originated in Indian subcontinent.

Charaka is believed to have lived during the 4th century BCE, although the exact dates of his birth and death are uncertain. He is considered one of the principal contributors to the Charaka Samhita, an ancient Ayurvedic text that is one of the foundational texts of Ayurvedic medicine.

The Charaka Samhita is a comprehensive treatise on various aspects of medicine, including etiology, diagnosis, treatment, and ethical considerations. It covers a wide range of topics, including anatomy, physiology, herbal medicine, surgical techniques, and the use of minerals and metals in medicine.

Charaka's approach to medicine was holistic and focused on understanding the body as a whole. He emphasized the importance of maintaining a balance among the three doshas (vata, pitta, and kapha) and believed that disease resulted from an imbalance in these doshas. His treatments aimed to restore this balance through dietary changes, herbal remedies, lifestyle modifications, and therapies such as massage and detoxification.

== Date ==
After surveying and evaluating all past scholarship on the subject of Charaka's date, Meulenbeld concluded that, the author called Charaka cannot have lived later than about 150-200 CE and not much earlier than about 100 BCE. Maharishi Charaka is also known as the court physician during the reign of the famous king Kanishka of Kushan Empire.

Charaka has been identified by some as a native of Kashmir. Professor Sylvain Lévi after discovering Buddhist manuscripts in Central Asia and China, came to the conclusion that the famous Charaka, the author of Charaka Samhita belonged to Kashmir. The recension of the text available to us today was done by Acharya Dridhabala, a scholar of Kashmir. Jejjata, the author of commentary on the Charaka Samhita, was also Kashmiri and so was Udbhatta who commented upon Sushruta Samhita.

Charaka is also associated with the University of Taxila.

== Charaka and the Ayurveda ==
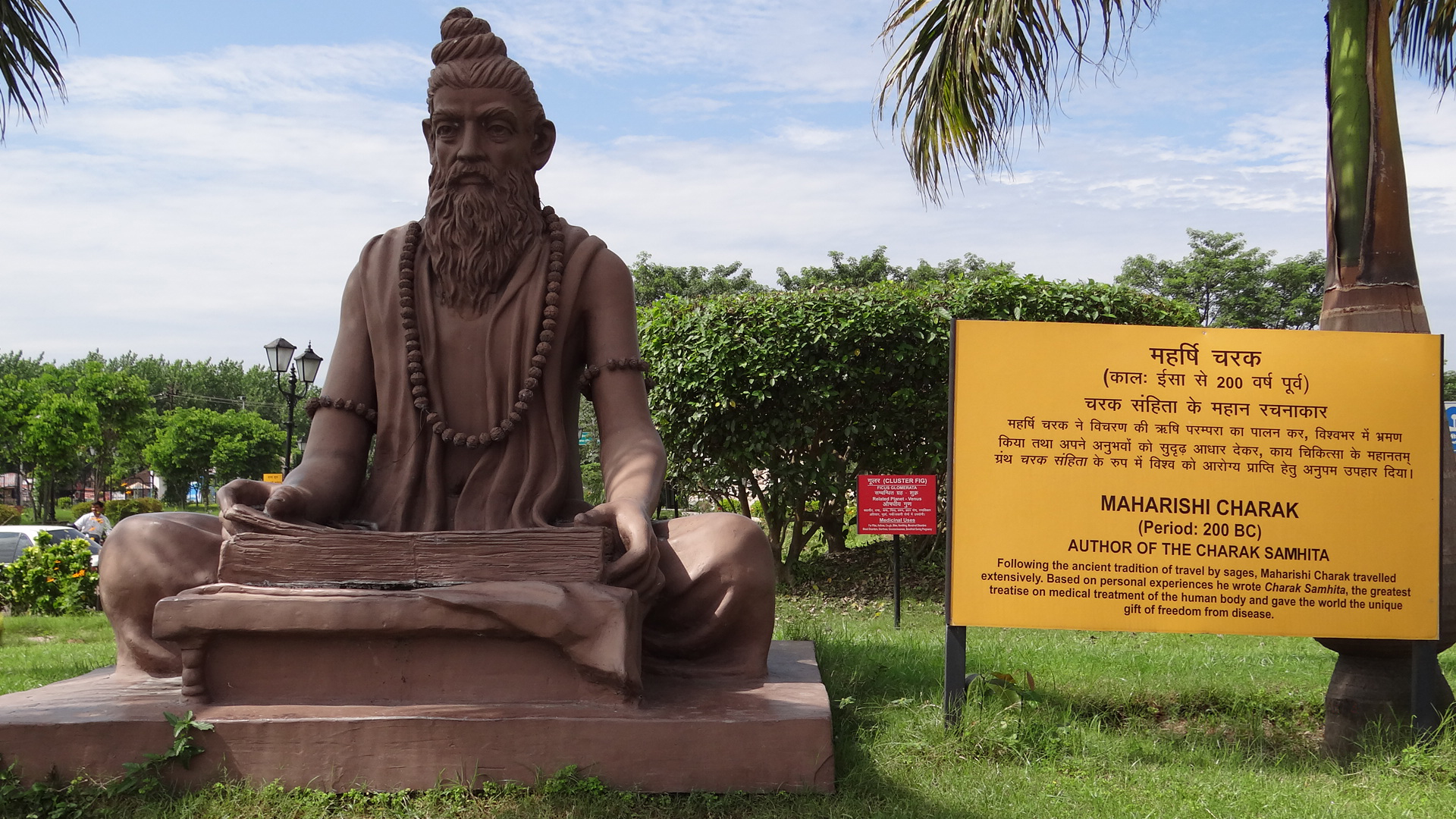
Charaka Monument at Yog Peeth Campus.

In Sanskrit, charaka is a term for a wanderer, sannyasi (ascetic), and sometimes used in the context of the ancient tradition of wandering physicians who brought their medical expertise and magico-religious rites from village to village

A body functions because it contains three dosha or principles, namely movement (vata), transformation (pitta) and lubrication and stability (kapha). The doshas correspond to the Western classification of humors, wind, bile, and phlegm. These doshas are produced when dhatus (blood, flesh and marrow) act upon the food eaten. For the same quantity of food eaten, one body, however, produces dosha in an amount different from another body. That is why one body is different from another.

Further, he stressed, illness is caused when the balance among the three doshas in a human body are disturbed. To restore the balance he prescribed medicinal drugs. He also describes various parasitic worms(krimi).

Charaka studied human anatomy and described the structure of various organs. The Charaka Samhita enumerates 360 bones in the human body, including teeth. The text recommends the consumption of māṃsa rasa (meat soup) from the sixth month of pregnancy onward. It also advises the application of freshly cut meat to insect or reptile bites, suggesting that it may help absorb poison.

The Charaka Samhita describes more than 150 medicinal substances of animal origin, including meat from wild animals such as fox and crocodile, as well as fish, fish oil, bird eggs, and beeswax. In addition, it details numerous medicinal formulations combining animal products with plant-based ingredients and minerals such as salts, soots, and alkalis.

== Charaka Samhita ==
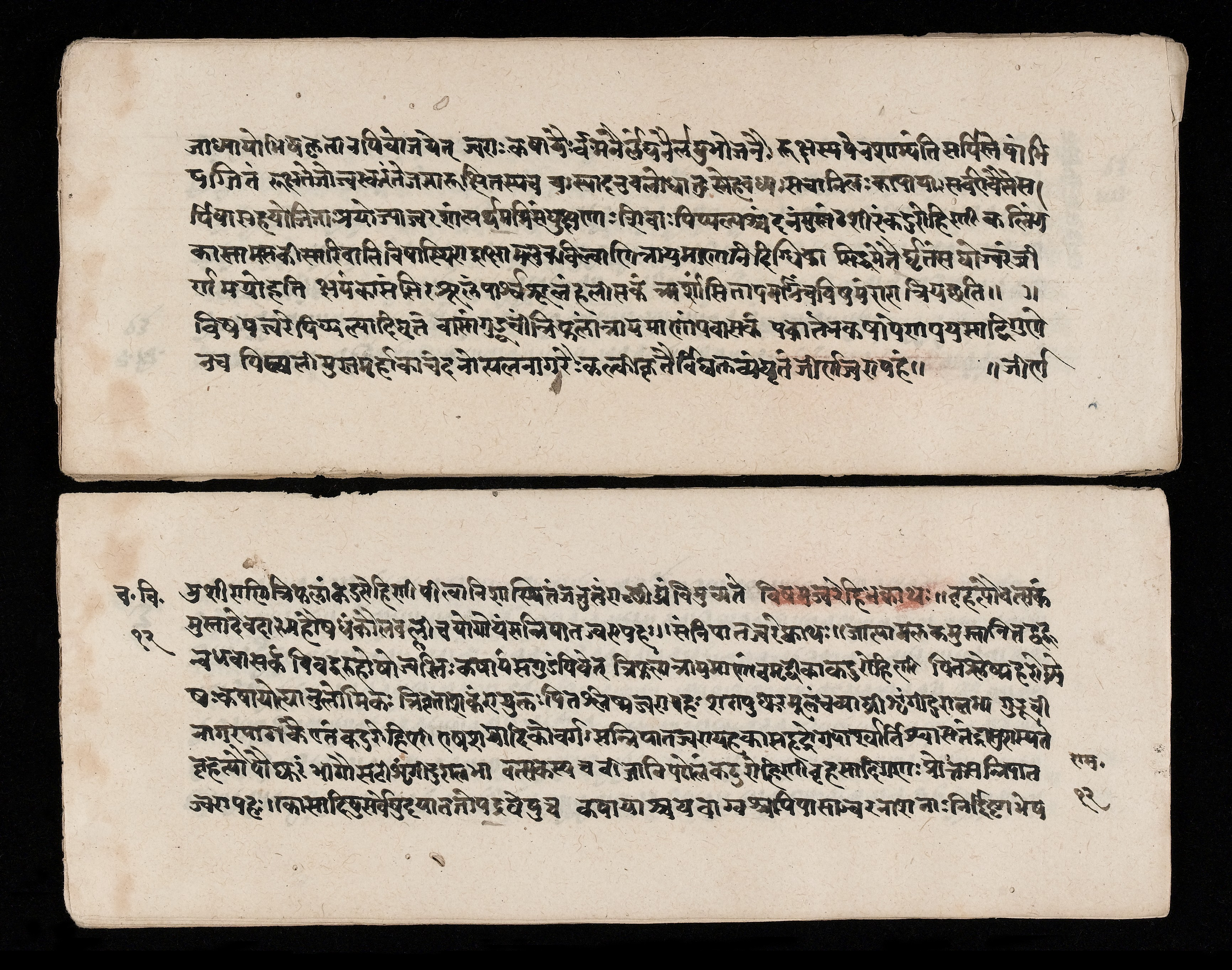
A section of the Charaka Samhita

Agnivesha, under the guidance of the ancient physician Atreya, composed an encyclopedic medical compendium in the eighth century BCE, the Agnivesha Samhitā. The work received little attention. The Agnivesha Samhitā was revised by Charaka and renamed the Charaka Samhitā. In this form it became well known. The Charaka Samhitā was itself later supplemented with an extra seventeen chapters added by the author Dṛḍhabala, while retaining its name. The Charaka Samhita is one of the two foundational text of Ayurveda, the other being the Sushruta Samhita. For two millennia it remained a standard work on the subject and was translated into many foreign languages, including Arabic and Latin.

== See also ==
- Agastya
- Dhanvantari
- Siddha medicine
- Sushruta

== Sources ==
- Kaviratna, Avinash C.; Sharma, P. (1913). The Charaka Samhita 5 Vols. Sri Satguru Publications. ISBN 978-81-7030-471-5.
- Ray, Priyadaranjan; Gupta, Hirendra Nath; Roy, Mira (1980). Suśruta Saṃhita (a Scientific Synopsis). New Delhi: INSA.
