= Tirunarayur Ramanathar Temple =

Tirunarayur Ramanathar Temple is a Shiva temple located at Tirunarayur in Thanjavur district, Tamil Nadu, India.

== Location ==
This temple is located at Rangarajapuram, facing east.

== Presiding deity ==
The presiding deity of the temple is Ramanathar. The Goddess is known as Parvathavartini.

== Structure ==
The temple has shrines for the presiding deity, the goddess, Vinayaka, Muruga with his consorts, Durga, Dakshinamurti and Shani. This temple is under the administration of the Hindu Religious and Charitable Endowments Department, Government of Tamil Nadu.The temple has a tank.

== Significance ==
Shani is found in a separate shrine along with his two consorts Mandhadevi and Jestadevi and his two sons Kuligan and Manthikan. There is no Dhvajastambha for the presiding deity Ramanathar. But the shrine of Shani has a Dhvajastambha. His Vahana crow is found here. Dasharatha came and worshipped the Shani. Surya along with Ushadevi and Prathyuksha are also found here. In order to get rid off from the Shani Dosha and longtime illness and get prosperity devotees come to this temple. After the fulfilment of their vows they wear garments to the deities.

== Festivals ==
Pournami, Sivaratri, Pradosha and other festivals are celebrated here.

== Gallery ==
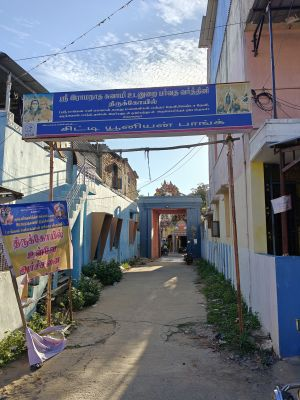
Entrance

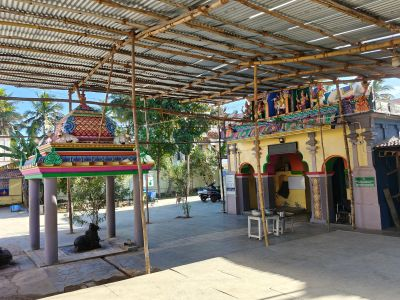
Nandhi, Front mandapa

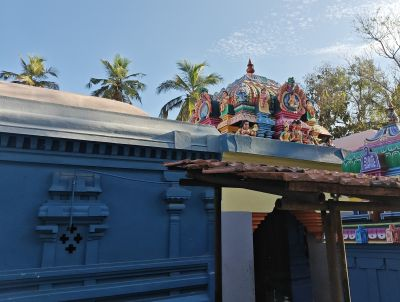
Vimana of the presiding deity
