= Kalikamba Temple =

Hindu temple in Mangalore, India

Coordinates: 12°52′13.27″N 74°50′3.82″E

The Kalikamba Temple

Sri Kalikamba Vinayaka Temple is located in Lower Car Street, Mangalore, India.

The temple is mainly revered by the Vishwakarma Brahmana community (people involved in the goldsmith, blacksmith, carpentry and architecture businesses).

The temple underwent major renovation the year 2000. The Garbhagrihas of Lord Ganesha and Goddess Kalikamba were rebuilt with granite.

== Deities ==
This following deities are worshipped in this temple.

- Sri Vinayaka (Lord Ganesh)
- Sri Kalikamba (Goddess Kali)
- Sri Vishwakarma (Parabrahma)
- Sri Vasuki ( There is a small Nagabana within the premises)
- Navagrihas
- Vasantha Mantapa

== Gurumatha ==
Within the temple premises, there is a math in the name of Sri Nagalinga Guru (popularly known as Ayya Guru). It is known as Gurumutt.

== Festivals ==
Ugadi is the main festival celebrated here. It is celebrated over 10 days with grandeur along with a lot of cultural activities.

Special Poojas are also performed during the months of Shravana and Bhadrapada

Annual Deepotsava

== Social services ==
Every 5 years, the temple also conducts Samoohika Upananyana (Mass thread ceremony) for poor vishwakarma Brahmins living in the Dakshina Kannada and Udupi districts.

A Sri Kalikamba Seva Samiti committee volunteers for many social service activities.

There is a Vishwakarma Sahakara Bank (previously known as S K Goldsmith cooperative society) which mainly caters to the needs of the Vishwakarma community apart from others.

There are several trusts associated with the temple which encourage education among Vishwakarma students by offering scholarships for brilliant students and monetary help for poor students, from primary school to higher education.
