= All India Agarbatti Manufacturing Association =

All India Agarbathi Manufacturing Association (AIAMA) as an statutory body was formed in 1949 with seven members for promoting and developing industries engaged in the manufacture of Agarbathis. All India Agarbathi Manufacturing Association (AIAMA) with present membership of 3,000 claims an export revenue of Rs 1,000 crore.

== History ==
All India Agarbathi Manufacturing Association (AIAMA) was formed as apex body in 1949 primarily aimed for the growth and development of industries engaged in manufacturing agarbathi.

Arjun Ranga is currently elected as the president of All India Agarbathi Manufacturing Association.

== Members ==
All India Agarbathi Manufacturing Association (AIAMA) claims to have more than 1,000 members and with the inclusion of different type of manufacturers in unorganised sector the membership totals around 3,000.

== Employment ==
Agarbathi Manufacturing industry in India creates employment for five lakhs people with 80 percent of them being women.

== Contribution to Economy ==
The contribution of revenue from industries engaged in manufacturing of agarbhathis is estimated at around Rs 8,500 crore including Rs 1,000 crore from export and major contribution comes from Karnataka.

== Challenges ==
The industries engaged in the manufacturing of agarbathis are facing the challenges of high manufacturing cost due to increase in cost of raw materials like paper.

== See also ==
- Economy of India
