= Tantex =

American non-profit organization

The Telugu Association of North Texas (TANTEX) was formed in 1986 as a non-profit, non-religious organization by immigrant Telugu people in the United Stateswith South Asian roots.

It was mainly an initiative to understand the difficulties faced by the Telugu immigrants in Texas and address it in a way to integrate the Telugu community into mainstream American society. TANTEX evolved into a medium of promoting the Telugu culture, education and the community affairs and activities.

Apart from these activities TANTEX also airs Telugu programs on air on regional radio channels in Dallas (and across the US) with Radio Salaam Namaste and Fun Asia for a few hours every weekend.

TANTEX is governed by a President and an Executive Committee. All leaders are elected by volunteers over an annual election. The term is the calendar year. This executive committee is comprised and supported by many sub-committees. They vary from Cultural, Communication, Reception to Technology related. Many members on an ongoing basis register and be a part of the organization. To become a member one has to pay the membership fee per event basis. Membership can be paid per individual or per family basis.

== Membership ==
Currently there are two types of memberships:

- Life Memberships
  - One time fee per family
  - Patrons fee
- Annual Memberships
  - Family fee
  - Individual fee
  - Student fee

== Additional benefits ==
Additional benefits are provided for the members of the group. These include:

- Discounts at various TANTEX organized events.
- Telugu Velugu Magazine every quarter.
- Free Telugu Movie every quarter.
- Annual Picnic for members.
- Discounts at various regional Dallas Restaurants and Grocery Stores.

== TANTEX organization ==
- Office Bearers
- Executive Committee
- Board of Trustees
- Nominated Committees
  - Cultural Committee
  - Audio/Video Committee
  - Public Relations Committee
  - Web Committee
  - Membership & Registration Committee
  - Youth Committee
  - Food Committee
  - Marketing & Volunteers Committee
  - Community Service Committee
  - Business Seminars Committee
  - Telugu Saahitya Vedika Committee
  - Telugu Velugu - Editorial Board Committee
  - Radio Committee
  - Women's Forum Committee

== Activities ==
- Telugu Velugu: This is periodical newsletter sent to the members via email and the quarterly magazine "TELUGU VELUGU". Subscription is open and requested by sending the admin an email.
- Telugu Radio: This is the weekly edition which promotes the discussions, debates, music, singing, etc. over the radio channels. Though TANTEX does not have a dedicated radio station, it does air programs on other Indian channels. TANTEX hosts two Radio Programs on the weekends. On Sundays tune in to Radio Salaam Namaste on 104.9 FM from 9:00 AM to 11:00 AM for Weekend Vinodam and FunAsia Radio on 700 AM from 10:00 AM to 12:00 Noon for GanaSudha. In addition to playing Telugu songs, these programs include celebrity interviews, valuable medical information and provide information on all upcoming events .
- Saahitya Vedika: Nela Nela Telugu Vennela is a congregation of Telugu literary lovers. This meeting is held on every third Sunday Guest speakers present their interpretation of Telugu classics while budding writers share their creations.
- Maitri: Is an activity at forging friendly interaction within members and other people.
- Community Service: Various kinds of community services are organized from time to time. TANTEX also organizes a free Clinic session every year to provide access to quality healthcare services to low-income and uninsured residents. The objective of the clinic is to build a healthier community by promoting and providing easy access to healthcare services to all low income DFW residents.
- Other activities: As a socially conscious organization, TANTEX conducts a variety of programs that are not just restricted to the Telugu speaking community in the DFW area. These include distribution of school supplies for under privileged children, community outreach programs, social service and voluntary activities.

TANTEX organizes several events during all major Telugu festivals such as Sankranthi, Ugadi and Diwali. TANTEX also organizes annual events such as "Carnival", a family picnic and competitions for kids as well as adults during summers. For the entertainment of its members, TANTEX also screens a free TELUGU MOVIE every quarter.

Additionally TANTEX also organizes and supports several other interesting events such as music concerts and Sahithya Vedika etc.

TANTEX has been actively organising various activities and programs year round for Telugu Community. Majority of these activities are open to General Public of the area and not restricted to the Members. Some of the activities are organized jointly with community members and other organizations. These events include and not limited to music concerts, felicitations to distinguished visitors, fund-raisings, etc. To be a part of such events the members pay a separate fee. Membership to TANTEX is open all through the year.

TANTEX celebrated its silver jubilee on July 8–9, 2011. The event was held on Black Academy of arts and letters, Dallas convention Center, Theatre Complex.
