= Deva (Buddhism) =

Type of celestial being

Translations of Deva
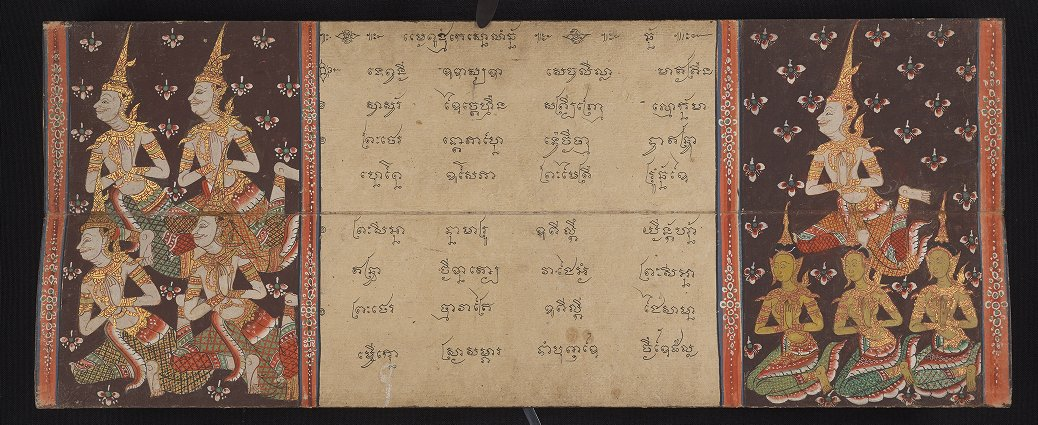
- Devas and three devis in reverence
- English: God, Deity
- Sanskrit: देव (deva)
- Pali: देव (deva)
- Assamese: দেৱ (Deo)
- Bengali: দেব (Deb)
- Burmese: နတ် (nat)
- Chinese: 天/天人 (neutral), 天女 (female) (Pinyin: Tiān/Tiānrén (neutral), Tiānnǚ (female))
- Indonesian: Dewa (male), Dewi (female)
- Japanese: 天/天人 (neutral), 天女 (female) (Rōmaji: Ten/Tennin (neutral), Tennyo (female))
- Khmer: ទេវៈ, ទេវតា, ទេព្ដា, ទេព (UNGEGN: Téveă, Tévôta, Tépda, Tép)
- Korean: 천/천인 (neutral), 천녀 (female) (RR: Cheon/Cheonin (neutral), Cheonnyeo (female))
- Lao: ເທວະ, ເທວດາ, ເທບ (theuaa, theuada, theb)
- Mongolian: тэнгэр (tenger)
- Sinhala: දේව (deva)
- Tibetan: ལྷ (lha)
- Thai: เทวะ, เทวดา, เทพ (thewa, thewada, thep)
- Vietnamese: Thiên/Thiên Nhân (neutral), Thiên Nữ (female)

A Deva (Sanskrit and Pali: देव; Mongolian: тэнгэр, tenger) in Buddhism is a type of celestial being or god who shares the god-like characteristics of being more powerful, longer-lived, and, in general, much happier than humans, although the same level of veneration is not paid to them as to Buddhas.

Other words used in Buddhist texts to refer to similar supernatural beings are devatā ("deities") and devaputta ("son of god"). While the former is a synonym for deva ("celestials"), the latter refers specifically to one of these beings who is young and has newly arisen in its heavenly world.

In East Asian Buddhism, the word deva is translated as 天 (literally "heaven") or 天人 (literally "heavenly person") (see the Chinese, Japanese, Korean and Vietnamese versions of this article for more). The feminine equivalent of deva, devi, is sometimes translated as 天女 (literally "heavenly woman"), in names such as 吉祥天女 or 辯才天女, although 天 alone can be used instead.

== Types ==
Deva refers to a class of beings or a path of the six paths of the incarnation cycle. It includes some very different types of beings which can be ranked hierarchically according to the merits they have accumulated over lifetimes. The lowest classes of these beings are closer in their nature to human beings than to the higher classes of deva. Devas can be degraded to humans or the beings in the three evil paths once they have consumed their merits.

The devas fall into three classes depending upon which of the three dhātus, or "realms" of the universe they are born in.

The devas of the Ārūpyadhātu have no physical form or location, and they dwell in meditation on formless subjects. They achieve this by attaining advanced meditational levels in another life. They do not interact with the rest of the universe.

The devas of the Rūpadhātu have physical forms, but are genderless and passionless. They live in a large number of "heavens" or deva-worlds that rise, layer on layer, above the earth. These can be divided into five main groups:

- The Śuddhāvāsa devas are the rebirths of Anāgāmins, Buddhist religious practitioners who died just short of attaining the state of Arhat (Brahma Sahampati, who appealed to the newly enlightened Buddha to teach, was an Anagami from a previous Buddha). They guard and protect Buddhism on earth, and will pass into enlightenment as Arhats when they pass away from the Śuddhāvāsa worlds. The highest of these worlds is called Akaniṣṭha.
- The Bṛhatphala devas remain in the tranquil state attained in the fourth dhyāna.
- The Śubhakṛtsna devas rest in the bliss of the third dhyāna.
- The Ābhāsvara devas enjoy the delights of the second dhyāna. They are also more interested in and involved with the world below than any of the higher devas, and sometimes intervene with advice and counsel.

Each of these groups of deva-worlds contains different grades of devas, but all of those within a single group are able to interact and communicate with each other. On the other hand, the lower groups have no direct knowledge of even the existence of the higher types of deva at all. For this reason, some of the Brahmās have become proud, imagining themselves as the creators of their own worlds and of all the worlds below them (because they came into existence before those worlds began to exist).

The devas of the Kāmadhātu have physical forms similar to, but larger than, those of humans. They lead the same sort of lives that humans do, though they are longer-lived and generally more content; indeed sometimes they are immersed in pleasures. This is the realm that Māra has greatest influence over.

The higher devas of the Kāmadhātu live in four heavens that float in the air, leaving them free from contact with the strife of the lower world. They are:

- The Parinirmita-vaśavartin devas, luxurious devas to whom Māra belongs;
- The Nirmāṇarati devas;
- The Tuṣita devas, among whom the future Maitreya lives (they are also referred to as the Contented Devas);
- The Yāma devas (or Devas of the Hours);

The lower devas of the Kāmadhātu live on different parts of the mountain at the center of the world, Sumeru. They are even more passionate than the higher devas, and do not simply enjoy themselves but also engage in strife and fighting. They are:

- The Trāyastriṃśa devas, who live on the peak of Sumeru and are something like the Olympian gods. Their ruler is Śakra. Sakka, as he is called in Pali, is a Sotapanna and a devotee of the Buddha. (These are also known as the Devas of the Thirty-Three.)
- The Cāturmahārājikakāyika devas, who include the martial kings who guard the four quarters of the Earth. The chief of these kings is Vaiśravaṇa, but all are ultimately accountable to Śakra. They also include four types of earthly demigod or nature-spirit: Kumbhāṇḍas, Gandharvas, Nāgas and Yakṣas, and probably also the Garuḍas.

"Furthermore, you should recollect the devas: 'There are the devas of the Four Great Kings, the devas of the Thirty-three,..." [196. Dh.] "Feeders of joy we shall be like the radiant gods (devas)."

Sometimes included among the devas, and sometimes placed in a different category, are the Asuras, the opponents of the preceding two groups of devas, whose nature is to be continually engaged in war.

Humans are said to have originally had many of the powers of the devas: not requiring food, the ability to fly through the air, and shining by their own light. Over time they began to eat solid foods, their bodies became coarser and their powers disappeared.

There is also a humanistic definition of 'deva' [male] and 'devi' [female] ascribed to Gautama Buddha: a god is a moral person. This is comparable to another definition, i.e. that 'hell' is a name for painful emotions.

== Powers ==
Devas are invisible to the human eye. The presence of a deva can be detected by those humans who have opened the "Divine eye" (divyacakṣus), (Pāli: dibbacakkhu), (Chinese: 天眼), an extrasensory power by which one can see beings from other planes. Their voices can also be heard by those who have cultivated divyaśrotra, a power similar to that of the ear.

Most devas are also capable of constructing illusory forms by which they can manifest themselves to the beings of lower worlds; higher and lower devas sometimes do this to each other.

Devas do not require the same kind of sustenance as humans do, although the lower kinds do eat and drink. The higher orders of deva shine with their own intrinsic luminosity.

Devas are also capable of moving great distances speedily, and of flying through the air, although the lower devas sometimes accomplish this through magical aids such as a flying chariot.

== Comparison to gods ==
While deva may be translated as god, the devas of Buddhism differ from the gods and angels of many other religious traditions:

- Buddhist devas are not immortal. Their lives as devas began some time in the past when they died and were reborn. They live for very long but finite periods of time, ranging from thousands to (at least) billions of years.
- Buddhist devas do not create or shape the world. They come into existence based upon their past karmas and they are as much subject to the natural laws of cause and effect as any other being in the universe. They also have no role in the periodic dissolutions of worlds.
- Buddhist devas are not incarnations of a few archetypal deities or manifestations of a god; nor are they merely symbols. They are considered to be, like humans, distinct individuals with their own personalities and paths in life.
- Buddhist devas are not omniscient nor omnipotent. Their powers tend to be limited to their own worlds, and they rarely intervene in human affairs. When they do, it is generally by way of quiet advice rather than by physical intervention.
- Buddhist devas are not morally perfect. The devas of the worlds of the Rūpadhātu do lack human passions and desires, but some of them are capable of ignorance, arrogance and pride. The devas of the lower worlds of the Kāmadhātu experience the same kind of passions that humans do, including (in the lowest of these worlds) lust, jealousy, and anger. It is, indeed, their imperfections in the mental and moral realms that allegedly cause them to be reborn in these worlds.
- Buddhist devas are not to be considered as equal to a Buddhist refuge. While some individuals among the devas may be beings of great moral authority and prestige and thus deserving of a high degree of respect and veneration (in some cases, even being enlightened practitioners of the Dharma), no deva can ultimately be taken as the way of escape from saṃsāra or control one's rebirth. The highest honors are reserved to the Three Jewels: Buddha, Dharma, and Saṅgha.

== Conception ==
The realm of deva can be seen as a state of consciousness that developed a purer and more spiritual understanding of the world in contrast to hunger ghosts that symbolise the human instinct.

While it might be tempting to aspire a rebirth within the world of gods or celestial beings, the deva are so full of joy in this realm that they are unable to understand the teaching about the permanent dukkha in samsara. Furthermore, even a deva having consumed all the good karma within the pleasurable existence in this realm, can be reborn in Naraka. It will not bring the final release from samsara and the evils of the six paths; therefore, falling for the allure of heaven should be avoided.

== See also ==
- Anussati
- Cetiya
- Dharmapala
- Four Noble Truths
- Heng and Ha
- Lokapala
- Nat (spirit)
- Noble Eightfold Path
- Weituo
- Twenty-Four Protective Deities
- Yidam
