= Dhupa =

Ritual offering of incense in Indian religions

Dhupa or incense stick offering
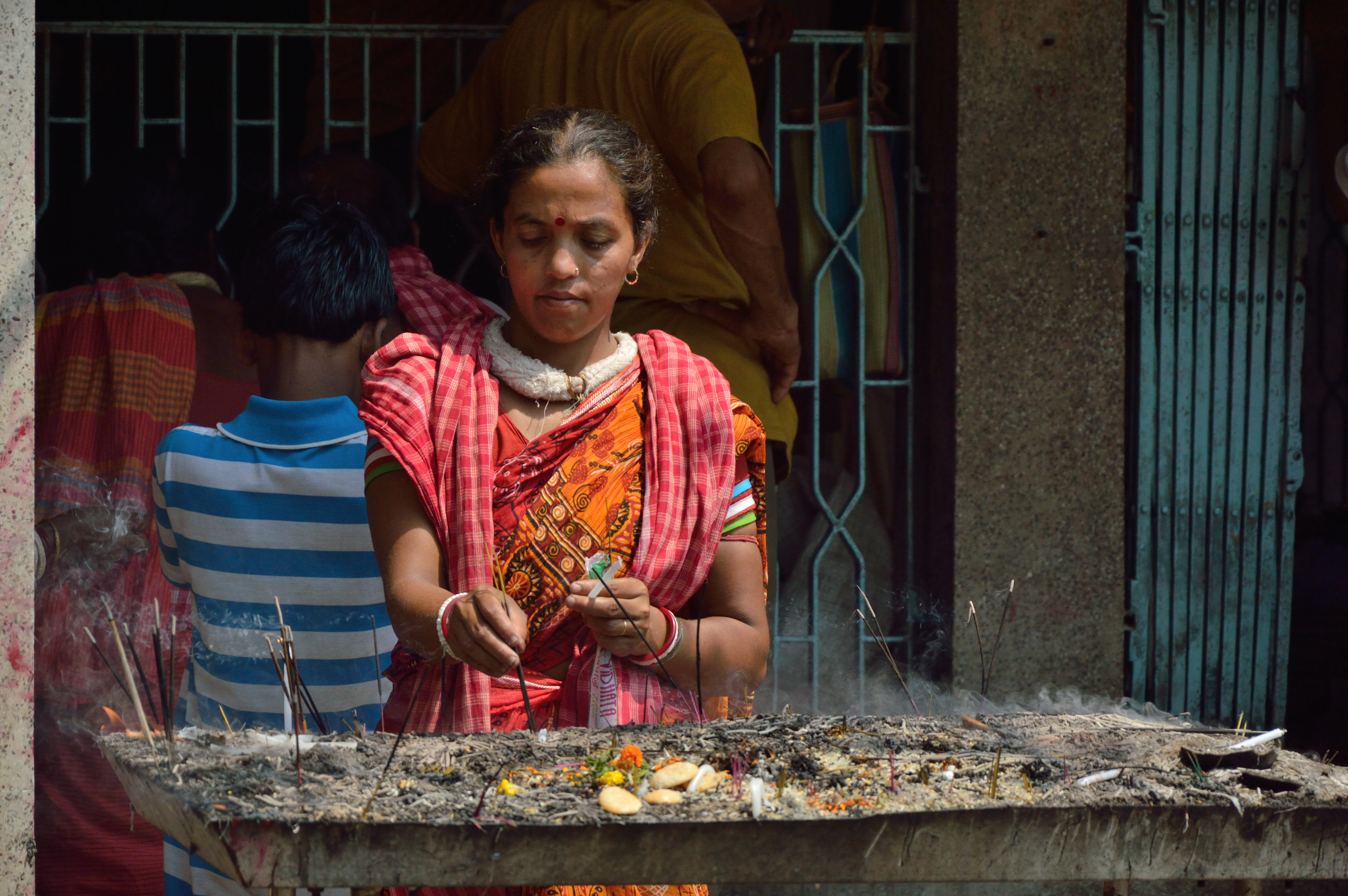
Hinduism, India

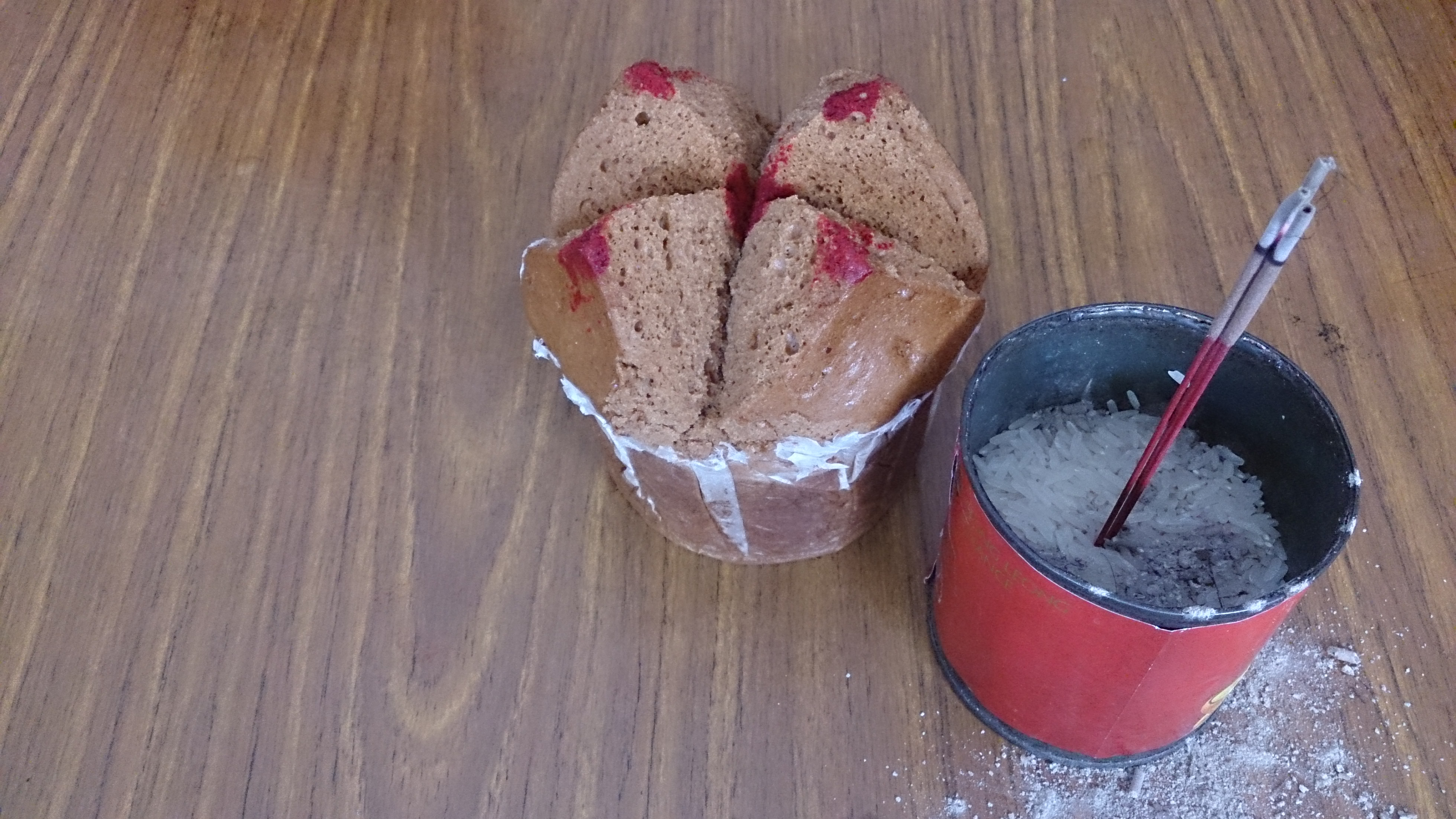
Taoism, Singapore

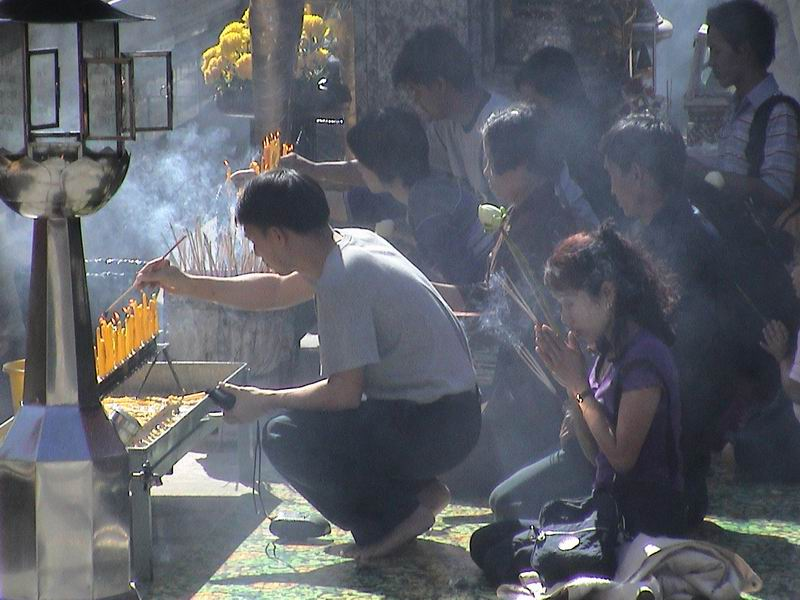
Buddhism, Cambodia

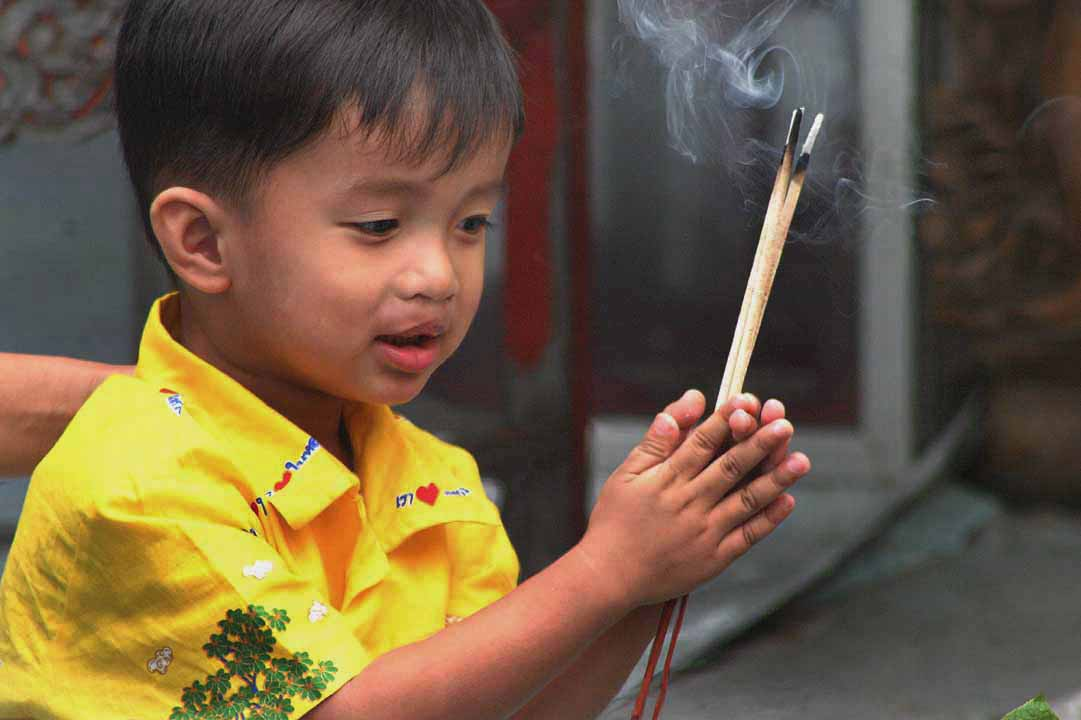
Buddhism, Thailand

Dhupa (Sanskrit: धुप, IAST: dhūpa) is, in Indian religions (such as Hinduism, Buddhism, Jainism, etc.), the ritual offering of incense during puja to an image of a deity, or other object of veneration. It is also the Sanskrit word for incense or perfume itself.

The Thai language also borrows this word from Sanskrit to call joss sticks or incense sticks, by omitting "a" in the word Dhupa. So, the word retains the Sanskrit form when it is written in the Thai alphabet as "Dhup" (ธูป). However, Sanskrit's ⟨dh⟩ ([dʱ]) is pronounced as an aspirated [tʰ] in Thai so that the word is normally pronounced or transliterated as "Thup" ([tʰûːp]). Incense burning before images, in temples and during prayer practice is also found in many parts of Asia, among followers of Jainism, Sikhism, Buddhism and Taoism.

The very idea of offering dhupa is personified in the dakini Dhupa, who is said in the Bardo Thödol to appear on the third day.

== See also ==
- Incense of India
- Upachara
- Puja (Hinduism)
- Puja (Buddhism)
