= Ugadi =

Kannada and Telugu Hindu New Year

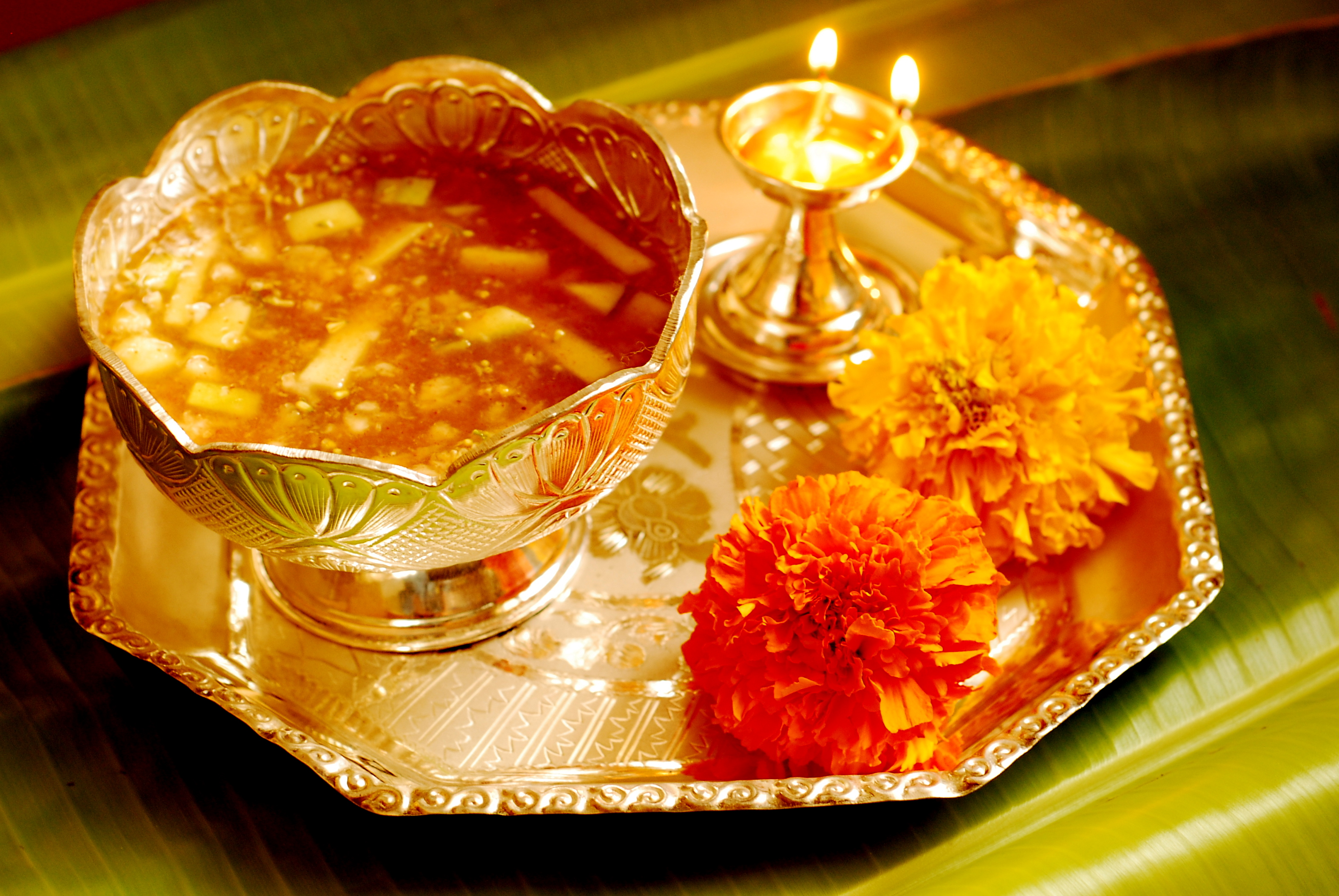
- Ugadi Pachadi with puja tray
- Official name: ఉగాది (Telugu) ಯುಗಾದಿ (Kannada)
- Observed by: Telugu and Kannadiga Hindus
- Type: Religious (Hindu), social, cultural
- Significance: Denotes the start of the new Hindu lunisolar year (Samvastra) and spring (Vasanta Ritu)
- Celebrations: Muggu/Rangoli, visiting Temples, Feast with Bobbattu, Holige and Bevu Bella
- Begins: Shukla Pratipada (the first day of the waxing moon phase)
- Date: 19 March 2026
- Frequency: Annual
- Related to: Gudi Padwa, Cheti Chand, Navreh, Hindu Festivals

Explanatory note on Hindu festival dates
- The Hindu calendar is lunisolar but most festival dates are specified using the lunar portion of the calendar. A lunar day is uniquely identified by three calendar elements: māsa (lunar month), pakṣa (lunar fortnight) and tithi (lunar day). Furthermore, when specifying the masa, one of two traditions are applicable, viz. amānta / pūrṇimānta. If a festival falls in the waning phase of the moon, these two traditions identify the same lunar day as falling in two different (but successive) masa. A lunar year is shorter than a solar year by about eleven days. As a result, most Hindu festivals occur on different days in successive years on the Gregorian calendar.

Ugadi celebrations, RGIV Airport, Hyderabad

Ugādi (Telugu: ఉగాది, romanized: Ugādi), Yugādi (Sanskrit: युगादि, romanized: Yugādi, lit. 'beginning of the era. Yuga, meaning “era,” and Adi, meaning “beginning”', Kannada: ಯುಗಾದಿ, romanized: Yugādi) or also known as Saṁvatsarādi (Sanskrit: संवत्सरादि, romanized: Saṁvatsarādi, lit. 'beginning of the year. Samvat, meaning “era,” and Adi, meaning “beginning”'), is the first day of the year on the Hindu calendar. It is traditionally celebrated by the Kannadigas and Telugu people in the Indian states of Andhra Pradesh, Karnataka and Telangana, in some parts of Tamil Nadu and Kerala, as well as by diaspora communities elsewhere. The year is part of the traditional sixty-year cycle (known as the Samvatsara), with each having a unique Sanskrit name. The festival is observed on Chaitra Śukla Pratipadā, the first tithi (lunar day) of the waxing fortnight in the Hindu lunisolar month of Chaitra. According to Brahma Purana, this day is marks Sṛṣṭyādi, the anniversary of the beginning of cosmic creation by Brahma. In the Gregorian calendar, it typically falls in late March or early April which coincides with the beginning of the spring (Vasanta Ṛtu).

The day is observed by drawing colourful patterns on the floor called Muggulu/Rangoli, mango leaf decorations on doors called torana, buying and giving gifts such as new clothes, giving charity to the poor, oil massages followed by special baths, preparing and sharing a special food called pachadi, and visiting Hindu temples. The pachadi is a notable festive food that combines all flavors – sweet, sour, salty, bitter, astringent, and piquant. In Kannada and Telugu harvest traditions, it is a symbolic reminder that one must expect all flavors of experiences in the coming new year and make the most of them. Followers of the Souramana calendar system observe Ugadi in Karnataka, when the sun transits into the Aries constellation, which is also the festival of Baisakhi and is locally known as Souramana Ugadi or Mesha Sankranti.

Ugadi has been an important and historic festival of the Hindus, with medieval texts and inscriptions recording major charitable donations to Hindu temples and community centers on this day. The same day is observed as a New Year by Hindus in many other parts of India, such as Gudi Padwa in Maharashtra, Goa, and is a national public holiday in Mauritius. It is also a public holiday in Indonesia as Hindu Saka New Year which celebrated widely in Bali as Nyepi.

== Etymology ==
The term Ugadi is a Tadbhava (vernacular phonetic evolution) derived from Sanskrit compund Yugādi (युगादि), formed by Sandhi: yuga (period, cycle, or epoch) and ādi (commencement or origin). This translates to 'the beginning of new astronomical cycle or year'. It is formally designated as Saṁvatsarādi (beginning of the Samvatsara).

The Telugu people use the term Ugadi (ఉగాది), and the Kannadigas use the term Yugadi (ಯುಗಾದಿ) for this festival.

== History ==
The Brahma Purana links the day to Sṛṣṭyādi, the beginning of cosmic creation by Brahma, thus establishing its religious significance as the start of new yuga.

Hindu calendar

Historically, the Deccan calendar's was anchored to the Shalivahana Saka era, traditionally attributed to Satavahana ruler Gautamiputra Satakarni. Determining the exact Chaitra Shukla Pratipada sunrise required precise lunisolar astronomy. Ancient Indian astronomers, most notably the 12th century Deccan scholar Bhaskaracharya refined the lunar calculations used to fix the start of the new year and regulate Panchangams. This resulted in the standardization of lunisolar reckoning and the 60 year Samvatsara cycle across Telangana, Karnataka and Andhra Pradesh.

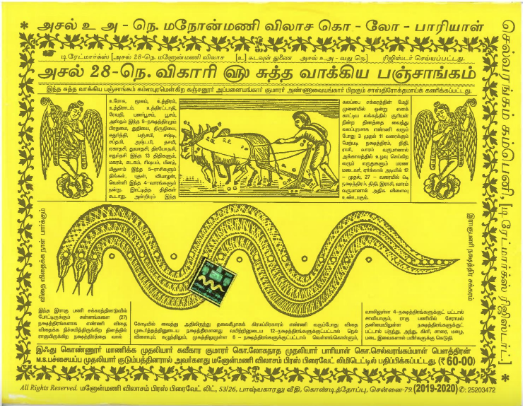
Snake Panchangam in Tamil, 2019

Epigraphical records from the Chalukya dynasty, Kakatiya dynasty, and the Vijayanagara Empire show extensive royal grants, land endowments (dāna), and provisions for chattras (free feeding houses). These were done especially on Yugādi to honor and celebrate the commencement of new religious year.

== Celebrations ==
=== Mango Leaf Toranam & Muggu (Rangoli) ===
Powder based rangoli

The Kannada and Telugu communities in Andhra Pradesh, Karnataka, Telangana and Tamil Nadu celebrate the festival with great fanfare. Preparations for the festival begin a week ahead. Houses are given a thorough clean and decluttered. People buy new traditional clothes and fresh household items.

Flower based rangoli

Celebrations begin before sunrise. It begins with Abhyanga Snanam where family members wake up before sunrise and apply warm sesame or coconut oil to their bodies and hair. After letting it soak for 15 to 30 minutes, it is washed off using a herbal paste made of chickpea flour (besan), turmeric, sandalwood and shikakai.

Plastic replica of traditional toranam arrangement of flowers and mango leaves

Mango leaves and coconuts are considered auspicious in the Hindu tradition. The entrances of houses are washed and cleaned with water and cowdung and decorated with intricate rice flour or coloured powder patterns and floral designs (muggu in Telugu, rangoli in Kannada). Strings of fresh green mango leaves (toranalu) and marigolds are tied across doorways. In new clothes, families offer morning prayers to household deities and visit local temples to seek blessings and prosperity.

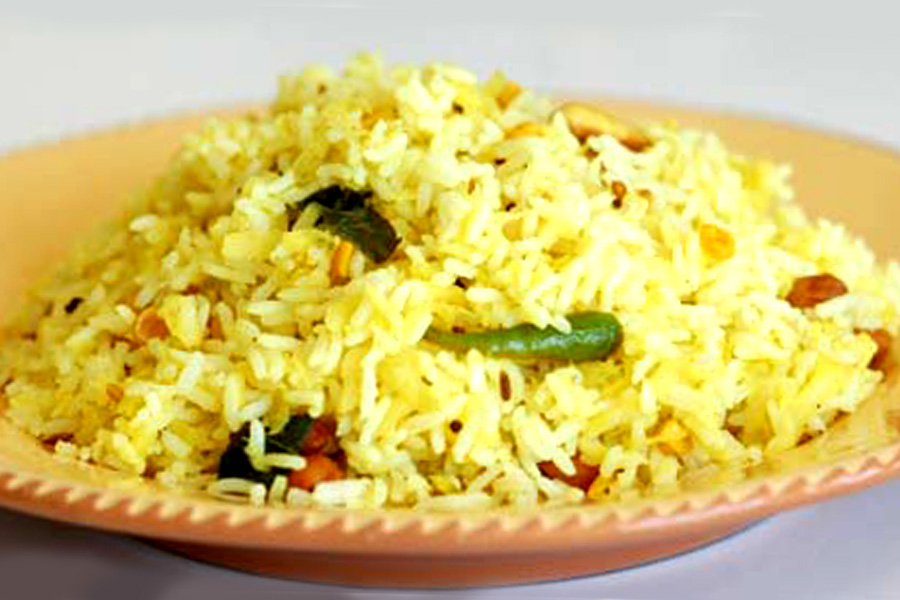
Pulihora

Several special dishes are prepared for the occasion. In Andhra Pradesh and Telangana, this is prepared as Ugadi pachadi, while in Karnataka it is known as bevu-bella (ಬೇವು-ಬೆಲ್ಲ). Other dishes include pulihora, burelu, various types of raw mango pickles in Andhra Pradesh and Telangana, mango pickles and kosambari in Karnataka, and a sweet lentil and jaggery stuffed flatbread known as bobbatlu, bhakshalu, or polelu in Telugu, and obbattu or holige in Kannada.

Ugadi Feast

=== Ugadi Pachadi (Bevu Bella) ===
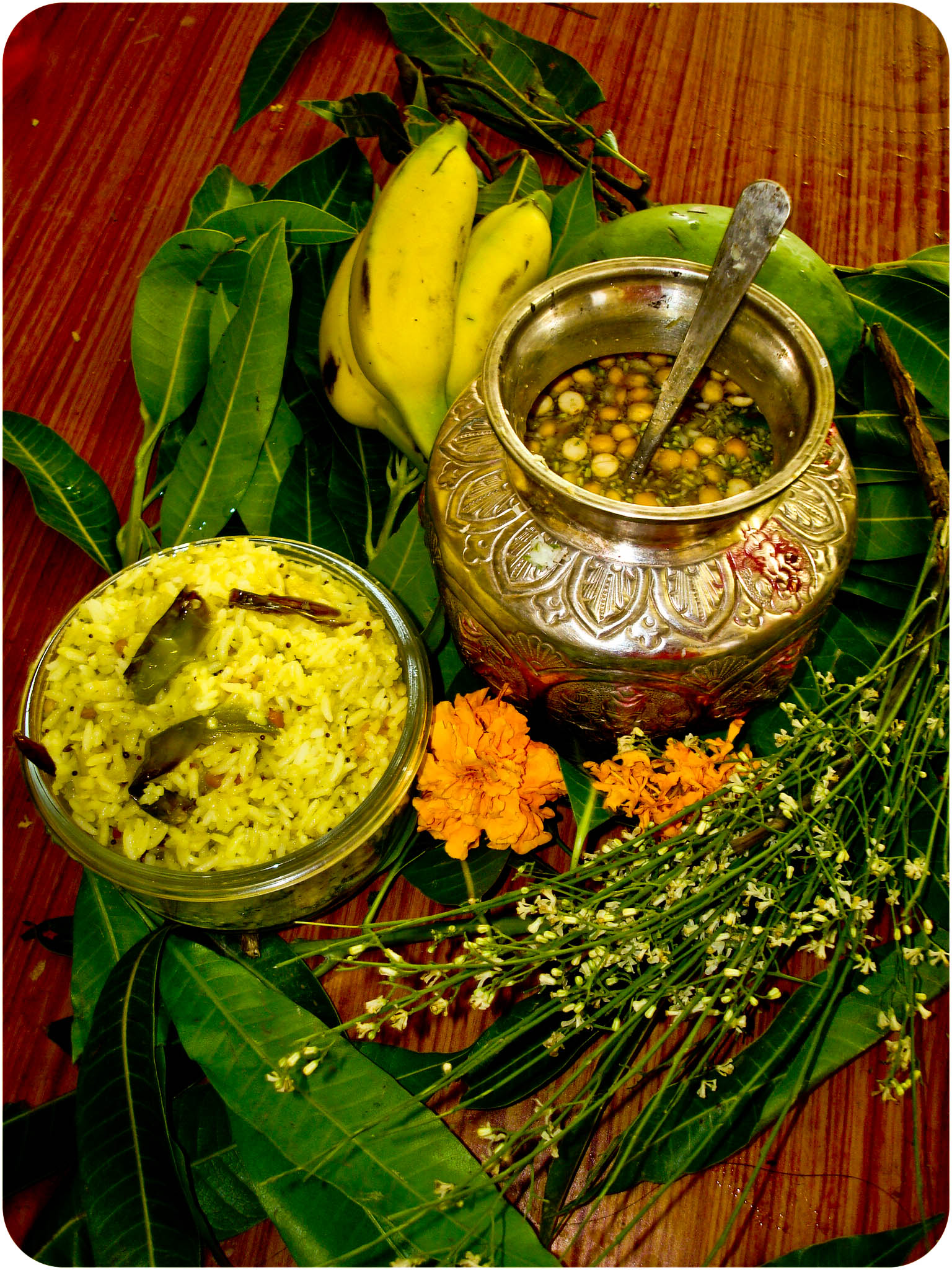
Ugadi Pachadi and Pulihora decorated with neem buds, mango leaves, some flowers and bananas.

The most iconic preparation is Ugadi Pachadi in Telugu regions and bevu-bella in Karnataka. Ugadi pachadi incorporates ṣaḍruci (Sanskrit: षड्रुचि, the six primary tastes of ancient Indian philosophical tradition):

- Bitter (tikta) from neem buds or flowers (vepapootha), representing sadness and difficulty;
- Sweet (madhura) from jaggery, representing happiness and joy;
- Pungent (katu) from green shilli or black pepper, representing anger or excitement;
- Salty (lavaṇa) from salt, representing essential balance;
- Sour (amla) from tamarind, representing challenges;
- Astringent (kaṣāya) from raw mango chunks, representing surprise or anticipation.

Ingredients used in the preparation of Ugadi Pachadi

Beyond the philosophical symbolism, this reminds individuals to cultivate equanimity (samatva) toward varied experiences in one's life. This dish is also rooted in Ayurveda—consuming neem buds with raw mango and jaggery balances the bodily Doshas. This acts primarily to pacify kapha and pitta during sesonal transition to hot summer (Ṛtu sandhi).

=== Panchanga Sravanam ===
Panchanga Shravanam, Hyderabad

A central religious rite of Ugadi is the Pañcāṅga Śravaṇam (listening to the reading of the traditional Panchanga almanac). On the evening of Ugadi, families traditionally gather at temples, community halls, or homes. An astrologer, pandit or senior elder opens the new year's almanac and reads it as a ritual.

During this almanac reading, the five essential astronomical elements (pañcāṅga) of the day are read aloud: Tithi (lunar phase), Vāra (day of the week), Nakshatra (lunar mansion), Yoga (auspicious angle), and Karana (half-tithi). The reading also provides details on annual eclipses, the year's governing planetary cabinet (Navanāyaka), rainfall, forecasts for agriculture (Megha-phala), and the year's general spiritual and material outlook.

=== Kavi Sammelanam ===
Kavi Sammelanam, Hyderabad, 2017

Kavi sammelanam (gathering of poets) is a traditional literary assembly and poetry conference held along with panchanga sravanam.

Poets recite composition on arrival of spring, significance of new year's specific name in the 60 year calendar, social issues and cultural heritage.

A moderator (Sanchalana Karta) conducts the session, introducing acclaimed poets, scholars and writers who recite verses in Telugu or Kannada. The event is a mix of classical poetry Chandas, modern free verse (Vachana Kavitha) and satire (Hasya Kavitha).

== Related festivals ==
Maharashtran Hindus refer to the festival, observed on the same day, as Gudhi Padwa (Marathi: गुढी पाडवा). The Sindhis celebrate the same day as Cheti Chand, which is the beginning of their calendar year. Manipuris also celebrate their New Year as Sajibu Nongma Panba on the same day.

The Hindus of Bali in Indonesia also celebrate their new year on the same day as Nyepi.

== See also ==
- Astronomical basis of the Hindu calendar
- Hindu units of time
- Yuga
- Vishu
