= Bevu Bella =

Bevu Bella is a pachadi eaten during Ugadi.

Bevu Bella may refer to:

- Bevu Bella (1963 film), an Indian Kannada film
- Bevu Bella (1993 film), an Indian Kannada film
