= Dhātu (Ayurveda) =

Dhātus (dhä·tōōs), n.pl. ( from Sanskrit धातु dhātu - layer, stratum, constituent part, ingredient, element, primitive matter ) in Ayurveda, the seven fundamental principles (elements) that support the basic structure (and functioning) of the body.

They consist of:

- Rasa dhatu (lymph) the substratum formed just after the digestion of food. The main function of this Dhatu is nourishment.
- Rakta dhatu (blood)This is the second Dhatu formed after the food digestion. This is formed from the former Dhatu, Rasa Dhatu
- Mamsa dhatu (muscles) This is the third Dhatu. This is formed from the former Dhatu, Rakta Dhatu. The main function of covering the bones.
- Medus dhatu (fat)
- Asthi dhatu (bone)
- Majja dhatu (marrow (bone and spinal))
- Shukra dhatu (semen)

Traditional texts often refer to these as the Seven Dhātus (Saptadhātus). Ojas, meaning vigour or vitality, is known as the eighth Dhātu, or Mahādhātu (superior, or great dhātu).

== See also ==
Dhātu (disambiguation) - a Buddhist technical term or a stupa, Pāli thūpa.
