= Atreya =

Scholar of Ayurveda

Atreya or Atreyas (आत्रेय) Rishi, or Atreya Punarvasu, was a descendant of Atri, one of the great Hindu sages (rishis) whose accomplishments are detailed in the Puranas. Sage Atreya was a renowned scholar of Ayurveda, and a school of early Ayurveda was founded based on his teachings.

Some historians of Ayurveda date Atreya to 6th century BCE, and theorize that he was the personal physician of the Gandhara king Nagnajita. The Buddhist text Mulasarvastivada-Vinayavastu describes him as the teacher of Jivaka, the personal physician of the Buddha, and connects him to Takshashila in Gandhara.

The oldest portions of the Bhela Samhita and the Charaka Samhita represent a consolidation of Atreya's teachings. The Bhela Samhita is in form of a dialogue between Atreya and his pupil Bhela. The original contents of Charaka Samhita are credited to Atreya, which were in turn codified and edited by Agnivesha and Charaka. According to Surendranath Dasgupta, the older Ayurveda of the Atreya-Charaka school probably has its root in the now extinct Caraṇavaidya branch of the Atharvaveda.

== Influences in Ayurvedic schools ==
According to the Charaka tradition, there existed six schools of medicine, founded by the disciples of the sage Punarvasu Ātreya. Each of his disciples, Agnivesha, Bhela, Jatūkarna, Parāshara, Hārīta, and Kshārapāni, composed a Samhitā. Of all the six, the one composed by Agnivesha was most revered. According to Dr. Tustomu Yamashita, the Bhela or Bheda(la)Samhita is often quoted by later authors and commentators of Ayurveda. Some of the manuscripts of Bhela available are the Thanjavur Manuscript - a palm leaf manuscript kept in Maharaja Sarfoji's library in Thanjavur - and East Turkestan Manuscript, only one folio of a paper manuscript, now kept in Staatsbibliothek zu Berlin.

Charaka later on, taking cues from Agnivesa Samhita, produced the now renowned work Charaka Samhita around 300 B.C. which survived and has been handed down to us in the form of Bower Manuscript dated around 4th century. Charaka Samhita is the foundational text of Ayurveda.
