= Vagbhata =

Ayurvedic physician

Vāgbhaṭa (वाग्भट) was one of the most influential authors in the classical Ayurvedic tradition. Several works are associated with his name, principally the Aṣṭāṅgasaṅgraha (अष्टाङ्गसंग्रह) and the Aṣṭāṅgahṛdayasaṃhitā (अष्टाङ्गहृदयसंहिता). Modern philological research, however, argues that these two texts are unlikely to be the work of a single author. The relationship between the two treatises, as well as their authorship, remains a subject of ongoing scholarly debate and has not been conclusively resolved.

Both texts make extensive reference to earlier Ayurvedic authorities, especially the Charaka Saṃhitā and the Suśruta Saṃhitā, and they systematize the eight-fold (aṣṭāṅga) division of Ayurveda. In the concluding verses of the Aṣṭāṅgasaṅgraha, the author identifies himself as the son of Siṃhagupta and a pupil of Avalokita. The works also contain religious and cultural references, including reverence for Brahmins, cattle, and Hindu deities, and they describe Ayurveda as originating from divine sources such as Brahmā and Sarasvatī, reflecting the syncretic intellectual milieu of early classical Ayurveda.

A long-standing but erroneous claim that Vāgbhaṭa was ethnically Kashmiri arose from a misreading of remarks by the German Indologist Claus Vogel. Vogel’s comments, which refer to the later commentator Indu rather than Vāgbhaṭa himself, were incorrectly applied in secondary literature. Vogel’s observation concerned linguistic and botanical terminology used by Indu and does not constitute evidence for Vāgbhaṭa’s regional origin.

Vāgbhaṭa is traditionally regarded as a successor to Charaka and Suśruta, and together they are often described in Ayurvedic literature as forming a classical triad of authorities. Some scholars place Vāgbhaṭa broadly in the early medieval period, often around the sixth century CE, possibly in regions associated with the north-western Indian subcontinent, though precise biographical details remain uncertain. Apart from autobiographical remarks within the texts themselves, little is known with certainty about his personal life.

== Kerala traditions and Ashtavaidya lineages ==
In Kerala, the Aṣṭāṅgahṛdayasaṃhitā attributed to Vāgbhaṭa has been particularly influential in the development of traditional Ayurvedic practice. The Ashtavaidya physicians of Kerala formed hereditary medical lineages associated with the practice of the eight branches of Ayurveda, and their training traditionally placed considerable emphasis on the study of classical Sanskrit medical texts, including the Aṣṭāṅgahṛdaya.

The Pulamanthole Mooss family is one of the hereditary Ashtavaidya families of Kerala. The family is traditionally associated with Pulamanthole in present-day Malappuram district, and its medical practice forms part of the wider Ashtavaidya tradition of Kerala.

A local tradition associated with Pulamanthole identifies the area with Vāgbhaṭa and associates him with a samādhi there. This claim forms part of the regional cultural tradition surrounding Vāgbhaṭa in Kerala, but it is not established by contemporary evidence and should therefore be distinguished from the historically documented evidence concerning his works and their transmission.

== Classics of Ayurveda ==
The Aṣṭāṅgahṛdayasaṃhitā (Ah, "Heart of Medicine") is written in poetic language. The Aṣṭāṅgasaṅgraha (As, "Compendium of Medicine") is a longer and less concise work, containing many parallel passages and extensive passages in prose. The Ah is written in 7120 Sanskrit verses that present an account of Ayurvedic knowledge. Ashtanga in Sanskrit means ‘eight components’ and refers to the eight sections of Ayurveda: internal medicine, surgery, gynaecology and paediatrics, rejuvenation therapy, aphrodisiac therapy, toxicology, and psychiatry or spiritual healing, and ENT (ear, nose and throat). There are sections on longevity, personal hygiene, the causes of illness, the influence of season and time on the human organism, types and classifications of medicine, the significance of the sense of taste, pregnancy and possible complications during birth, Prakriti, individual constitutions and various aids for establishing a prognosis. There is also detailed information on Five-actions therapies (Skt. pañcakarma) including therapeutically induced vomiting, the use of laxatives, enemas, complications that might occur during such therapies and the necessary medications. The Aṣṭāṅgahṛdayasaṃhitā is perhaps Ayurveda’s greatest classic, and copies of the work in libraries across India and the world outnumber any other medical work. The Aṣṭāṅgasaṅgraha, by contrast, is poorly represented in the manuscript record, with only a few, fragmentary manuscripts having survived to the twenty-first century, suggesting it was not widely read in pre-modern times. However, the As has come to new prominence since the twentieth century by its inclusion in the curriculum for ayurvedic college education in India. The Ah is the central work of authority for ayurvedic practitioners in Kerala.

== Legacy and local traditions ==
In addition to textual and scholarly study, Vāgbhaṭa is associated with a number of regional traditions in India, particularly in Kerala, where classical Ayurveda developed distinctive institutional lineages. These traditions form part of the cultural history of Ayurveda but are generally treated by historians as legendary or devotional accounts rather than established historical biography.

In Kerala, hereditary families of Ayurvedic physicians known as Ashtavaidyas (literally, “masters of the eight branches of Ayurveda”) preserved classical texts and clinical practices connected to the Aṣṭāṅga system described in Vāgbhaṭa’s works. Ethnographic and historical surveys of Kerala Ayurveda note that these families often traced their intellectual lineage to classical authors such as Vāgbhaṭa, Caraka, and Suśruta, though such links are understood as traditional affiliations rather than direct teacher–disciple relationships.

One such Ashtavaidya lineage is the Pulamanthole Mooss family of present-day Malappuram district, Kerala. Local family histories and community narratives maintained by the Pulamanthole Mooss tradition state that Vāgbhaṭa spent his final years in the Pulamanthole region and that a memorial site (samādhi) associated with him exists there. This association is referenced in institutional histories and regional cultural accounts but is not supported by epigraphic, archaeological, or contemporaneous textual evidence accepted by mainstream historians.

References to Vāgbhaṭa’s presence in Kerala also appear in Malayalam folklore literature, including Aithihyamala by Kottarathil Sankunni, a late nineteenth-century compilation of regional legends. Such sources are widely used to document Kerala’s cultural memory but are considered literary and folkloric rather than historical records.

Modern academic scholarship on Vāgbhaṭa focuses primarily on philological analysis of the Aṣṭāṅgahṛdaya and Aṣṭāṅgasaṅgraha, their relationship to earlier Ayurvedic traditions, and debates concerning authorship and chronology. While Kerala continues to regard Vāgbhaṭa as a foundational authority in Ayurvedic education and practice—particularly because the Aṣṭāṅgahṛdaya remains a central teaching text—claims regarding his residence or death in specific locations such as Pulamanthole are generally treated as regional tradition rather than verifiable historical fact.

== Translations ==
The Ah has been translated into many languages, including Tibetan, Arabic, Persian and several modern Indian and European languages. Selected passages of the Ah translated into English have been published in the Penguin Classics series.

== Other attributed works ==
Numerous other medical works are attributed to Vāgbhaṭa, but it is almost certain that none of them are by the author of the Ah.

- the Rasaratnasamuccaya, an iatrochemical work, is credited to Vāgbhaṭa, though this must be a much later author with the same name.
- an auto-commentary on the Ah, called Aṣṭāṅgahṛdayavaiḍūryakabhāṣya
- two more commentaries, called Aṣṭāṅgahṛdayadīpikā and
- Hṛdayaṭippaṇa
- the Aṣṭāṅganighaṇṭu
- the Aṣṭāṅgasāra
- the Aṣṭāṅgāvatāra
- a Bhāvaprakāśa
- the Dvādaśārthanirūpaṇa
- A Kālajñāna
- the Padhārthacandrikā
- the Śāstradarpaṇa
- a Śataślokī
- a Vāgbhaṭa
- the Vāgbhaṭīya
- the Vāhaṭanighaṇṭu
- a Vamanakalpa
- A Vāhaṭa is credited with a Rasamūlikānighaṇṭu
- A Vāhaḍa with a Sannipātanidānacikitsā

== Literature ==
- Rajiv Dixit, Swadeshi Chikitsa (Part 1, 2, 3).
- Luise Hilgenberg, Willibald Kirfel: Vāgbhaṭa’s Aṣṭāṅgahṛdayasaṃhitā - ein altindisches Lehrbuch der Heilkunde. Leiden 1941 (aus dem Sanskrit ins Deutsche übertragen mit Einleitung, Anmerkungen und Indices)
- Claus Vogel: Vāgbhaṭa's Aṣṭāṅgahṛdayasaṃhitā: the First Five Chapters of its Tibetan Version Edited and Rendered into English along with the Original Sanskrit; Accompanied by Literary Introduction and a Running Commentary on the Tibetan Translating-technique (Wiesbaden: Deutsche Morgenländische Gesellschaft—Franz Steiner Gmbh, 1965).
- G. Jan Meulenbeld: A History of Indian Medical Literature (Groningen: E. Forsten, 1999–2002), IA parts 3, 4 and 5.
- Dominik Wujastyk: The Roots of Ayurveda. Penguin Books, 2003, ISBN 0-14-044824-1
- Dominik Wujastyk: "Ravigupta and Vāgbhaṭa". Bulletin of the School of Oriental and African Studies 48 (1985): 74-78.
