= Ashtāṅgasaṅgraha =

The Aṣṭāṅgasaṅgraha is a Sanskrit text thought to be authored by the ancient Indian scholar Vagbhata. As a part of the Brhat Trayi, it is one of the principal texts of Ayurveda, which is an indigenous medicine system of India.

== See also ==
- Brhat Trayi
- History of science and technology in the Indian subcontinent
- Culture of India
- Ethnomedicine
- Herbal medicine
