= Brhat Trayi =

Three Sanskrit encyclopaedias of medicine

The Bṛhat-Trayī, literally translated as "The Great Triad (Of Compositions)", refers to three early Sanskrit encyclopaedias of medicine, which are the core texts of the indigenous Indian medical system of Ayurveda. These are contrasted with the Laghu-Trayī or the "lesser triad", a secondary set of later authoritative compositions.

This classification cannot be found in works earlier than about 1900. It was first devised probably at some time in the early twentieth century, although its earliest use has not yet (2024) been identified. The classification is not known to Sanskrit authors. It is part of the modern creation of a formal canon for ayurvedic literature.

There are older, authoritative medical encyclopaedias that are not included in the Bṛhat-Trayī, for example the Bheḷa-saṃhitā.

== Overview ==
The following three works constitute the Bṛhat-Trayī:

- Charaka Samhita (चरकसंहिता) was composed by Agnivesha (अग्निवेश) and later edited by Charaka (चरक).
- Sushruta Samhita (सुश्रुतसंहिता) was composed by Sushruta (सुश्रुत).
- Ashtanga Hridayam Samhita (अष्टाग्ङहृदयसंहिता) was composed by Vagbhata (वाग्भट) (fl. ca. AD 610, in Sindh). A work called Aṣṭāṅgasaṃgraha (अष्टाग्ङसंग्रह) is also ascribed to the last author, Vāgbhaṭa वाग्भट. It is a more diffuse work than the Aṣṭāṅga-hṛdaya-saṃhitā, and is in mixed prose and verse (the Ashtanga Hridayam is in verse only). These two works are versions of the same material, but their exact relationship, authorship and priority is still debated by scholars. There are thousands of medieval manuscripts of the Ashtanga Hridayam in archives and libraries across India, while the Aṣṭāṅga Saṃgraha is rare, having survived to the 20th century in only a few partial copies. It is thus clear that the Ashtanga Hridayam is the text that was most widely studied in pre-modern times, and was in fact the standard textbook of ayurveda for several hundred years. In spite of this, probably through a misunderstanding some time in the early 20th century, it is the Aṣṭāṅga-saṃgraha that is primarily taught as part of the modern ayurvedic BAMS syllabus at Government ayurvedic colleges.

The Bṛhat-Trayī or "Triad of the Great" is also sometimes called the Vṛddha-Trayī, which means "the triad of the old/mature (classics or authors)".

All three works have been published in numerous Sanskrit editions, and all have been translated into English more than once. The English translations of P. V. Sharma and of Srikantha Murthy are considered among the better ones. The German translation of the Ashtanga Hridayam by Hilgenberg and Kirfel is widely considered the very best and scholarly translation available.

== See also ==
- History of India
- Culture of India
- History of science and technology in the Indian subcontinent
