= Incense in India =

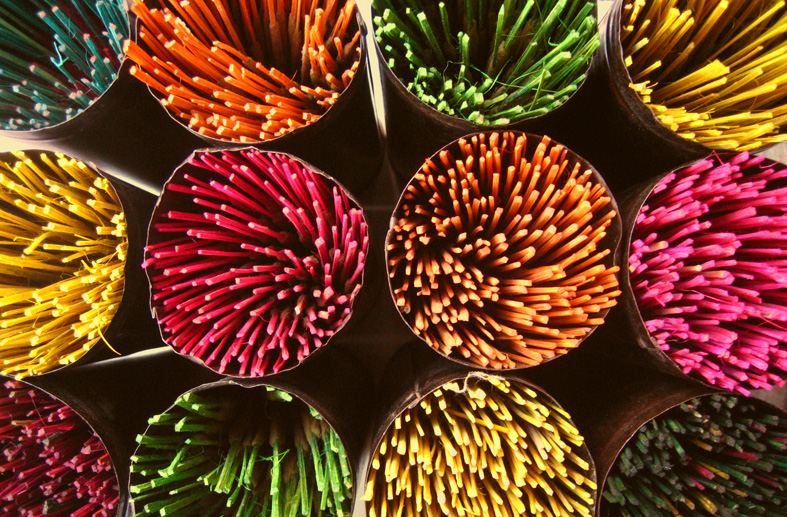
Incense being sold in a market in Bangalore

India is the world's main incense producing country, and is also a major exporter to other countries. In India, incense sticks are called agarbatti (Agar-wood: from Dravidian) Tamil agil, agir, Sanskrit varti, meaning "stick".) An older term "Dhūpavarti" is used in ancient and medieval texts which encompasses various types of stick incense recipes. Incense is part of the cottage industry in India and an important element of many religions in the region since ancient times. The method of incense making with a bamboo stick as a core originated in India at the end of the 19th century, largely replacing the rolled, extruded or shaped method which is still used in India for dhoop.

Dhūpa (incense) and gandhā (perfumes) are two of five accessories of religious worship in Hinduism, Jainism and Buddhism; others being puṣpa (flowers), dīpa (lamp) and nivedya (food). Worshipping deities with these five accessories is generally considered as a way for achieving the four ends of human life; dharma, artha, kama and moksha.

== Etymology ==
The word agarbatti is derived from (Agar: from Dravidian Tamil அகில் (agil), அகிர்(agir)., Sanskrit varti, meaning "stick"); an older term, "dhūpavarti", is more commonly used in ancient and medieval texts which encompasses various types of stick incense recipes.

== History ==
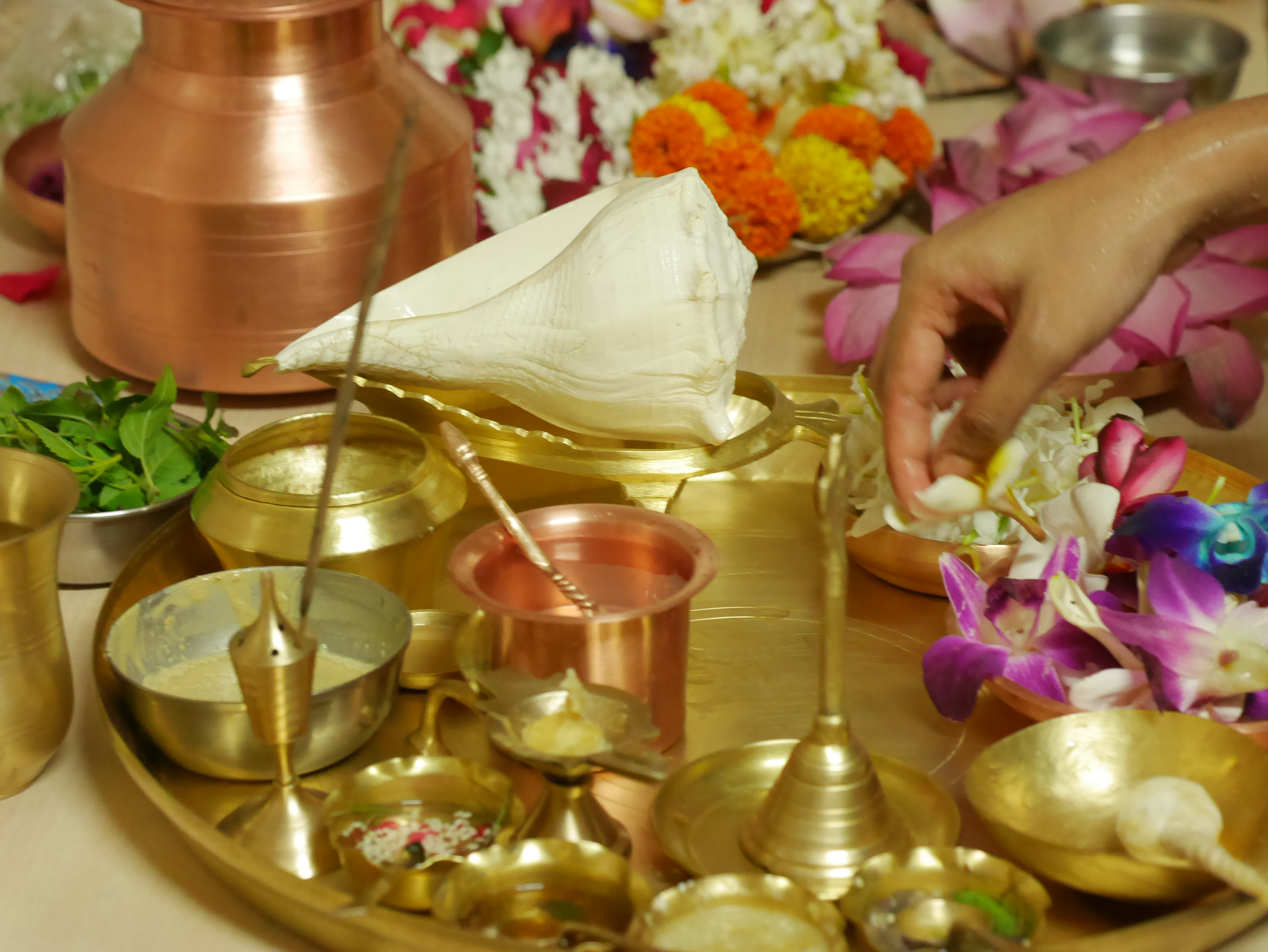
Prayer offering tray with incense sticks and gandhā (sandalwood paste)

Early evidence of incense use and incense burners have been found in Neolithic and Chalcolithic periods (3300–1300 BCE). The oldest textual source on incense is the Vedas, specifically, the Atharva-veda and the Rigveda, which encouraged a uniform method of making incense. Although Vedic texts mention the use of incense for masking odors and creating a pleasurable smell, the modern system of organized incense-making was likely created by the medicinal priests of the time. Thus, modern, organized incense-making is intrinsically linked to the Ayurvedic medical system in which it is rooted. Mahabharata classifies incense dhupa into three types known as niryasa; resins from Commiphora wightii, Shorea robusta, Boswellia serrata, second is sarin; heartwoods from aloeswood, sandalwood, roots, flowers and herbs, and third is kritrima; artificially produced or manufactured like jaggery or molasses from sugarcane for example. Blend of these three types of ingredients formed basis of incense making since ancient period. The practice of incense as a healing tool was assimilated into the religious practices of the time. Dharmaśāstra describes incense ingredients as sandalwood, aloeswood, camphor, musk, saffron, piper cubeba, resins, jaggery, ghee, honey, fragrant flowers, among others. Puranic texts similarly gives incense ingredients similar to Dharmasastra like sandalwood, aloeswood, musk, camphor, saffron, piper cubeba, resins etc. As Hinduism matured and Buddhism was founded in India, incense became an integral part of Buddhism as well. Around 200 CE, a group of wandering Buddhist monks introduced incense stick making to China.

In Arthashastra, a text on treatise of statecraft and political science, agarwood, sandalwood and other aromatics were subject to a state tax at one-tenth or one-fifteenth of the sale price of the products. The Kamasutra text describes Gandhayukti ("Perfume blending"), the technique of making perfumes as one of the 64 arts to be learned by men and women. Commonly described incense types in early texts include Dhūpavarti (incense sticks, early form without bamboo-core), Dīpavarti (powder incense rolled inside cotton lamp-wicks), Churna dhupa (incense powder mixed with camphor), Pindadhupa (fresh incense paste made into lumps), Vasana (perfumed oils for lamps).

== Texts on incense ==
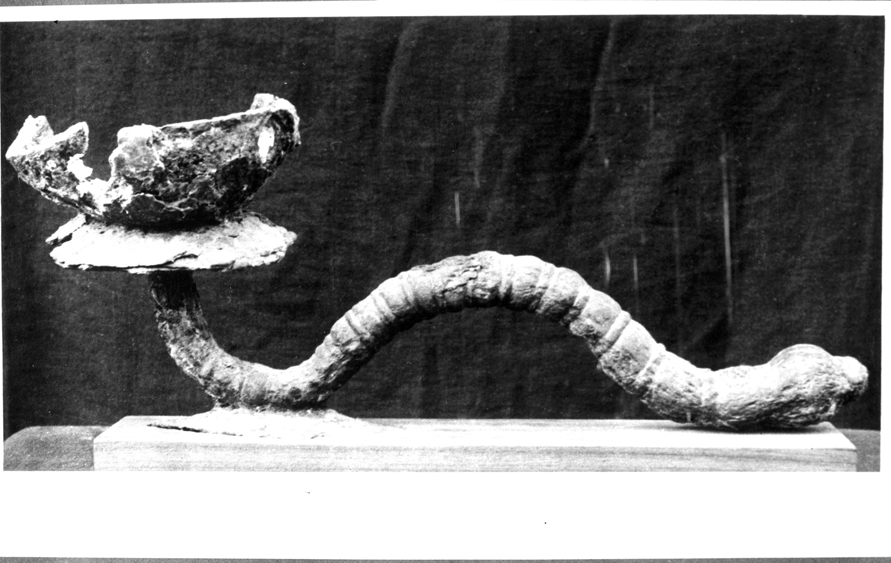
"Dhupdaan" incense burner in a form of lotus stem from Nalanda, Bronze, 10th century, India

While the earliest texts that mention aromatic preparations in any detail appear to be religious and medical texts; some of which had chapters dedicated to incense; it is only later during the first millennium CE is when evidence of texts devoted entirely to "Gandhayukti" the art of perfumery emerge for diverse use. According to James Mchugh from "approximately the late centuries of the first millennium CE onwards do we see significant materials on perfumery incorporated into texts on erotics and courtly life." These texts are not just limited to incense making, but the topic of "Gandhayukti" covers diverse products related to perfumery and cosmetics of various kinds; Curna (perfume powders), Vilepana and Anulepana (fragrant sandal unguent, applied to the body and left on to render its fragrance), Udvartana and Sananiya (fragrant bathing exfoliants), Dhupavarti (incense sticks, early form which lacks bamboo-core), Dipavarti (perfumed powder rolled inside cotton lamp-wicks), Vasana (perfumed oils), among others.

A chapter in ancient Bṛhat Saṃhitā is dedicated to Gandhayukti ("Perfume blending"), here Varahamihira provides several perfume formulas, one of them known as Gandharnaava ("Ocean of perfumes") is a unique perfume formula, in which from a given number of ingredients placed in a grid, numerous combinations can be made, leading in some cases to a vast number of potential perfumes. He provides a complex algorithm for calculating how many perfumes one can make from a given number of ingredients, in one case up to 43,680 perfumes can be made.

The Gandharnaava (Ocean of perfumes) is prepared from the following sixteen substances, if every four of them are permuted variously at will and that in one, two or four parts. The substances are Uŝira, Aguru, Vālaka, Madanfal, Karpûra, Dhānya, Nāgapuşpa, Tagara, Saibya, Spŗkkā, Ghana, Karcûra, Vyāghranakha, Nakha, Coraka, Chandana. The total number of perfumes resulting from the sixteen ingredients being mixed in all possible combinations is 43,680.

The Lokopakara ("for the benefit of the people") text has a chapter dedicated to incense recipes for various needs, below are few examples;

Divine perfume; Prepare a mixture of the powders of sandalwood, bharudi leaves, male flowers of screw-pine, unrefined sugar, agar, and costus roots taken in equal proportion. Add jaggery...to this final mixture and prepare oblong tables. This is called 'divine incense' and is amiable to all gods.

Incense for dissipation of bugs and other insects; the mixture of the powders of sandalwood, vidanga seeds, flowers of arjun trees, along with jaggery...and honey dissipates flies, gnats and bugs from the house when fumigated with it.

In the text Sharngadhara-paddhati ("Sharngadhara's Guidebook"), a chapter is dedicated to Jalavasa (perfumed waters), Mukhavasa (mouth freshener), Angavasa (cloth perfume) and Dhupa (incense), below are some examples;

A person should fumigate both clothes & home with the incense of Camphor, Nakha, Giri, Kasturi, Jatamasami, Jatu in equal quantity with sandalwood & aloewood in two units mixed with molasses

An incense stick which is suitable for kings can be prepared from the mixture of Nakha, Aguru, Sihlaka, Valaka, Kunduru, Saileya, Candana, Syama by taking each in progressive proportion

An incense stick made from the compound of Marjari, Himavaluka, Pisunaka, Gorocana, Sihlaka, Karpura, pounded in water, in progressive proportion, mixed with ghee and sugar, this is known as Manmathavarti

The Haramekhala ("the Girdle of Hara") text describes preparations of the following aromatics for dinacharya ("daily-routine"), the fifth chapter is summarized by the author of the text in the following passage:

This collection of the applications of the fifth [chapter] is composed. There [is found] the preparation of water fragrance, as well as preparation of tooth sticks/brush. The preparation of beeswax [for the lips], as well as collyrium to decorate the eyes. Mouth fragrances, etc., oils, as well as the preparation of rubbing unguents. Then [there are] the practice of bathing, bathing materials, and the bath accessory materials. Fragrant clothes powders, [incense] sticks/wicks, and the preparation of perfumes, etc. The artificial manufacture of musk and the method of the extraction of various perfumes.

The chapter on perfumery in the text Nagarasarvasva ("The Complete Citizen" or "All About the Sophisticate") by Padmasri has some similarities to the Haramekhala in how it is organized, consisting of a number of aromatic formulae respectively for hair (kesapatavasa), dwelling (grhavasa), mouth (mukhavasa), water (jalavasa), betel-nut (pugaphalam), bathing powder (snaniya).

Perfume names in medieval period are also information on the aspirations expressed through aromatic culture that presents perfume formulae in a playful and literary manner; Dakshinapavana ("Southern Wind"), Chandrarasa ("Moon Juice"), Kandarpadarpa ("Pride of Kama"), Kogacchati? ("Who Goes There?"), Kolahala ("Uproar" or "Fracas"), Champakamoda ("with the perfume of champaka flowers").

When a person who has censed entire body [with this], is walked it is said by people "Who goes there?" therefore this incense is called "Who Goes There?" (Kogacchati?)

== Perfume games ==
Prahelikā are literary riddles used as entertainments at gatherings. In perfumery texts these literary riddles need to be solved in order to make incense recipes. The Kamasutra lists Gandhayukti ("Perfume blending") and Prahelikā ("riddles") as one of 64 arts to be learned by a person. Chapter titled "Nagarakavrtti" (‘The Avocation of the Nagaraka’) also describes dinacharya ("daily-routine") of bathing, cosmetics and use of perfumery and incense for various needs. Other Kama-related texts like Nagarasarvasva ("All About the Sophisticate") by Padmasri also describes Gandhaykuti in vastly more detailed manner. In erotic texts and in the surviving complex perfumery texts, perfumery and making perfumes is seen as sensuous and erudite pleasure, almost a high-class game with poetic riddles and puns. Perfumes were seen as indispensable to the goal of pleasure (kama), and the informated consumption of them was a vital part of what it meant to be a cultivated person. Padmasri mentions unknown perfumery text by the author named Lokesvara, it is one of several lost perfumery texts.

Various artful perfumes are celebrated as eminent inflamers of lust. The best lovers should be carefully instructed at the start from perfume texts. Having collected the essential part of the perfume texts, which are difficult to understand for those who are not cleaver, [and] which are by Lokesvara etc. I set it forth with very well known texts.

Bṛhat Saṃhitā by Varahamihira has a chapter dedicated to Gandhayukti ("Perfume blending"), here Varahamihira provides several formulas with grid patterns, on which perfume ingredients were placed where numerous combinations of perfumes can be made. This mathematical exercises in perfumery may have been a source of intellectual delight for the educated connoisseur of perfume. Surviving perfumery texts additionally contained sophisticated verbal puzzles that seem designed to entertain and impress the cultivated makers and users of perfumes. Those who were well versed in the sixty-four or seventy-two arts and techniques (kala) that defined their education and in addition to this erotic context, it would seem riddles were associated with the literary gathering called the "goṣṭhi". McHugh notes that "the audience was expected to engage in a bewildering, yet pleasurable, contest of intellectual, olfactory, erotic riddles." Therefore, art of perfumery was not entirely olfactory but also included the clever delights of combinatorics and word games. Solving poetic perfume riddles and complex puns of erotic nature, political science, religion etc to make perfume blends were part of perfume making art for the cultivated person.

== Lost texts ==
According to historian John McHugh, the earliest surviving texts to treat art of perfumery as main topic of the text in any detail appeared "around the middle of the first millennium CE" and in these texts "perfumery is discussed in context of matters of the body and the bedroom" and that by around the turn of the "first millennium CE, we have evidence of texts devoted entirely to the art of perfumery".

Many texts solely dedicated to perfumery are lost, they exist in fragments in other texts where the authors give credit to these texts for recipes. Only three texts survive, these include two texts named Gandhasara; Gandhasara by Gangadhara and Gandhasara by unknown author, and third text named Gandhavada. Mchung notes that the earliest layer of "Gandhasara, the Essence of Perfume, dating most likely from the early- to mid-second millenium CE" with later additions by several authors up to 13th century. Some of the notable lost perfumery texts include Gandhayukti by Isvara 10th century, Gandhasastra by Bhavadeva 10th century, Gandhatantra by anonymous author 12th century, Unknown title by Prthvisimha 12th century, Gandhasara by Gangadhara 13th century, Gandhasara by unknown author 14th century, Gandhavada by anonymous author 13th century, Parimalapradipa by unknown author 16th century, Gandhaparadipaptrika by unknown author 16th century.

== Ingredients ==
The basic ingredients of an incense stick are bamboo sticks, paste (generally made of charcoal dust or sawdust and jiggit" or Jigat a type of adhesive made from the bark of Litsea glutinosa and other trees), and the perfume ingredients – which traditionally would be a masala (powder of ground ingredients), though more commonly is a solvent of perfumes and/or essential oils. After the base paste has been applied to the bamboo stick it is, while still moist, immediately rolled into a fine wood powder, and then left for several days to dry; it may also be dipped into a scented solvent.

Many Indian incense makers follow Ayurvedic principles, in which the ingredients that go into incense-making are categorized into five classes. Ether (fruits), for example citrus medica, piper cubeba. Water (stems and branches), such as sandalwood, aloeswood, cedar wood, cassia, frankincense, myrrh, and borneol. Earth (roots) turmeric, vetiver, ginger, costus root, valerian, Indian spikenard. Fire (flowers), notably clove. And air (leaves), for example patchouli. Various resins, such as amber, myrrh, frankincense, and resin of the halmaddi tree are also used in masala incense, usually as a fragrant binding ingredient, and these add their distinctive fragrance to the finished incense. Some resins, such as gum arabic, may be used where it is desirable for the binding agent to have no fragrance of its own. Halmaddi has a particular interest to some consumers, possibly through its association with the popular Satya Nag Champa. It is an earth coloured liquid resin drawn from the Ailanthus triphysa tree; as with other resins, it is a viscous semi-liquid when fresh, it hardens to a brittle solid as it evaporates and ages. Some incense makers mix it with honey in order to keep it pliable. Due to crude extraction methods which resulted in trees dying, by the 1990s the Forest Department in India had banned resin extraction; This forced up the price of halmaddi, so its usage in incense making declined. In 2011, extraction was allowed under leasing agreements, which increased in 2013, though production is still limited for the resin to sometimes be stolen via improper extraction to be sold on the black market.

== Use ==
Incense is used in every day Hindu prayer rituals as one of five-offerings to deities. During rituals, an incense stick is lighted to create a pleasant odour in the air. It creates a setting for an auspicious ritual by filling the air with a pleasant smell.

Incense has some psychological benefits. The aroma of the incense is considered to have a healing power that has a soothing effect on the mind. The calming effect relaxes the mind and helps in performing rituals with better concentration. Prayer offered with a calm mind acts like a meditation process.

Incense has its own spiritual significance. The incense stick burns itself completely into ashes and yet fills the air with a pleasant smell. This ritual basically denotes human virtue of sacrificing oneself for society. The sticks are used as air fresheners during normal days as well and integral part of every Hindu ceremonies.

== Modern production ==
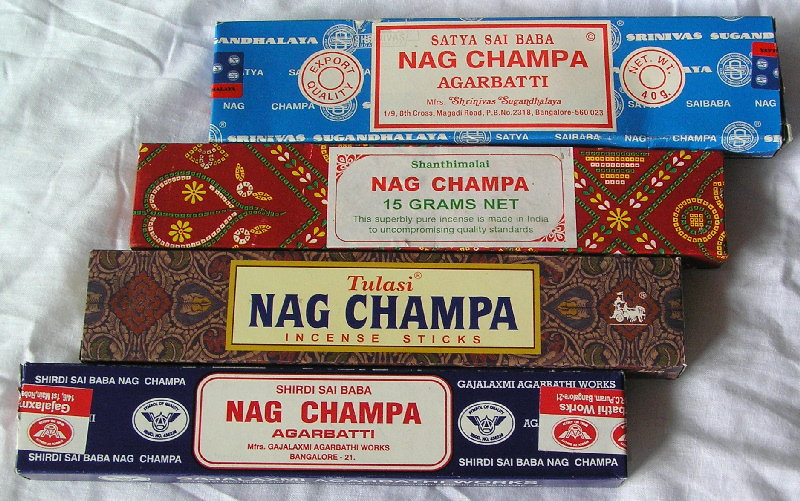
Assorted boxes of nag champa incense boxes, a common fragrance in India

Production may be partly or completely by hand or by machine. There are semi-automatic machine for applying paste, semi-automatic machine for perfume-dipping, semi-automatic machine for packing, or fully automated machines which apply paste and scent, though the bulk of production is done by hand-rolling at home. There are about 5,000 incense companies in India which take raw un-perfumed sticks hand-rolled by approximately 200,000 women working part-time at home, apply their own brand of perfume, and package the sticks for sale. An experienced home-worker can produce 4,000 raw sticks a day. There are about 25 main companies, who together account for up to 30% of the market, and around 500 of the companies, including a significant number of the main companies, are based in Bangalore.

The state of Karnataka, referred to as the Capital of Agarbathi (Incense Sticks), is the leading producer of the agarbathi in India, with Mysore and Bangalore being the main manufacturing centres of scented agarbatti and Gaya, Bihar was the manufacturing hub of unscented agarbatti. The Mysore region is recognised as a pioneer in the activity of agarbathi manufacturing. There are plenty of manufacturers in Maharashtra, Gaya and Gujarat and the western India agarbatti market is dominated by them. At a national level, the most prominent manufacturers include N. Ranga Rao & Sons with their Cycle Pure Agarbathies, Mode Retails with their Traditional Prabhu Shriram Agarbatti and Luxury Incense Sticks and cones, PremaNature with their Natural Vedic Incense Sticks, Patanjali with their Aastha agarbatti, Samun Agarbatti with their gaya darshan and ITC with their Mangaldeep.

== Economy ==
India is one of the world's top incense producing countries,. It was the largest exporter of incense until 2015, after several years of reduced import tariffs as a result of the ASEAN-India Free Trade Agreement. Subsequently, the Indian Ministry of Commerce and Industry (India) increased tariffs on incense imports in 2019 and 2020.

Under the aegis of the "Atma Nirbhar Bharat Abhiyan", the government of India approved an incense production and employment program on August 2, 2020. The program is called "Khadi Agarbatti Atma Nirbhar Mission", and was proposed by the Khadi Village Industries Commission (KVIC) of India. Under this scheme, the incense artisans will be provided automatic agarbatti and powder-mixing machines through private business partners. One quarter of the cost of each unit will be borne by KVIC via a subsidy, while the remnant will be paid through loans by the artisans.

== See also ==
- Culture of India
- Hindu temple – Place of worship in Hinduism
- Offering – Buddhist religious practice
- Puja – Prayer ritual in Hinduism
