= Svedana =

Steam herbal therapy in Ayurvedic treatment

Svedana or Swedana, means to "perspire" (Sanskrit: स्वेदन). It is used in Ayurvedic treatment. It is also known as steam therapy. There are different types of swedana. Sitting in sun is also a form of swedana. Swedana is a pre procedure for Panchakarma. Snehana and Swedana are pre procedures for Panchakarma. An herbal combination is sometimes added to the steam for medicinal effect.
