= Agnivesha =

Ayurvedic author in Hinduism

Agnivesha (Sanskrit: अग्निवेश, romanized: Agniveśa) is a legendary rishi (sage) in Hinduism, reputedly one of the earliest authors on Ayurveda (Indian alternative medicine). He is described to have codified the knowledge of his preceptor, Atreya, and arranged it in the form of a treatise, named the Charaka Samhita.

== Legend ==
Agnivesha is described to be the chief pupil of Punarvasu Atreya. The Agnivesha Samhita, dated back to 1500 BCE, is based on Atreya's teachings, and is a lost text on Ayurveda. The Agniveśatantra, consisting of 12,000 verses, is stated to be the foundational text of the Agnivesha school, one of the six schools of early Ayurveda (others being Parashara, Harita, Bhela, Jatukarna, and Ksharpani).

The text is mentioned in the Charaka Samhita: "the tantra (Agnivesha) as written by Agnivesha is compiled, edited and modified by Charaka" (agniveśakṛte tantre carakapratisaṃskṛte)
