= Dinacharya =

Ayurvedic medicine concept

Dinacharya (Sanskrit: दिनचर्या "daily-routine") is a concept in Ayurvedic medicine which proposes the healthy routine to be followed in a day and night. Ayurveda contends that routines help establish balance and that understanding daily cycles is useful for promoting health. Dinacharya says that each day, two cycles of change occur, that correlate with the Ayurvedic concept of dosha. Routines covered by dinacharya include: waking time, elimination, hygiene, massage, exercise, bathing, meditation and prayer, meals, study, work, relaxation and sleeping.

== See also ==
- Ayurveda
