= Dhatu =

Dhātu may refer to:

- Dhātu (ayurveda) – Sanskrit term for the seven fundamental elements of the body
- Skandha#Eighteen dhātus and four paramatthas – a Sanskrit technical term meaning realm or substrate in Buddhism
- A term used to denote the classical elements in Indian thought
- A Theravada Buddhist term for a stupa, a mound-like structure containing Buddhist relics
