= Dosha =

Ayurvedic medicine concept

The three doshas and the five great elements they are composed from

Dosha (Sanskrit: दोषः, IAST: doṣa) is a central term in Ayurveda originating from Sanskrit, and which refers to three categories or types of substances that are believed to be present conceptually in a person's body and mind. These dosha are assigned specific qualities and functions. These qualities and functions are affected by external and internal stimuli received by the body. Beginning with twentieth-century Ayurvedic literature, the "three-dosha theory" (Sanskrit: त्रिदोषोपदेशः, tridoṣa-upadeśaḥ) has described how the quantities and qualities of three fundamental types of substances called wind, bile, and phlegm (Sanskrit: वात, पित्त, कफ; vāta, pitta, kapha) fluctuate in the body according to the seasons, time of day, process of digestion, and several other factors and thereby determine changing conditions of growth, aging, health, and disease.

Doshas are considered to shape the physical body according to a natural constitution established at birth, determined by the constitutions of the parents as well as the time of conception and other factors. This natural constitution represents the healthy norm for a balanced state for a particular individual. The particular ratio of the doshas in a person's natural constitution is associated with determining their mind-body type including various physiological and psychological characteristics such as physical appearance, physique, and personality.

The Ayurvedic three-dosha theory is often compared to European humorism although it is a distinct system with a separate history. The three-dosha theory has also been compared to astrology and physiognomy in similarly deriving its tenets from ancient philosophy and superstitions. As the tenets of Ayurvedic medicine have no basis in science, using the concept of dosha to diagnose or treat disease is pseudoscientific.

== Role in disease, Roga ==
The Ayurvedic notion of doshas describes how bad habits, wrong diet, overwork, etc., may cause relative deficiencies or excesses which cause them to become imbalanced in relation to the natural constitution (prakriti) resulting in a current condition (vikriti) which may potentially lead to disease. For example, an excess of vata is blamed for mental, nervous, and digestive disorders, including low energy and weakening of all body tissues. Similarly, excess pitta is blamed for blood toxicity, inflammation, and infection. Excess of kapha is blamed for increase in mucus, weight, oedema, and lung disease, etc. The key to managing all doshas is taking care of vata; it is taught that this will regulate the other two.

Doshas are not supported by any Western experimental approaches to science.

== Principles ==
The doshas derive their qualities from the five elements (Sanskrit: पञ्चमहाभूत; pañca-mahābhūta) of classical Indian philosophy.

- Vāta or vata is characterized by the properties of dry, cold, light, subtle, and mobile. All movement in the body is due to properties of vata. Pain is the characteristic feature of deranged vata. Some of the diseases connected to unbalanced vata are flatulence, gout, rheumatism, etc. Vāta is the normal Sanskrit word meaning "air" or "wind", and was so understood in pre-modern Sanskrit treatises on Ayurveda. Some modern interpreters prefer not to translate Vata as air, but rather equate it with a modern metabolic process or substance.
- Pitta represents metabolism; It is characterized by heat, moistness, liquidity, sharpness, and sourness. Its chief quality is heat. It is the energy principle which uses bile to direct digestion and enhance metabolism. Unbalanced pitta is primarily characterized by body heat or a burning sensation and redness. Pitta is the normal Sanskrit word meaning "bile". It is etymologically related to the Sanskrit word pīta "yellow".
- Kapha is the watery element. It is a combination of earth and water. It is characterized by heaviness, coldness, tenderness, softness, slowness, lubrication, and the carrier of nutrients. It is the nourishing element of the body. All soft organs are made by kapha and it plays an important role in the perception of taste together with nourishment and lubrication. Kapha (synonym: śleṣman) is the normal Sanskrit word meaning "phlegm".

5 types of vata dosha	5 types of pitta dosha	5 types of kapha dosha
1. Prana vata – governs inhalation, perception through the senses and governs the mind. Located in the brain, head, throat, heart and respiratory organs.; 2. Udana vata – governs speech, self-expression, effort, enthusiasm, strength and vitality. Located in the navel, lungs and throat.; 3. Samana vata – governs peristaltic movement of the digestive system. Located in the stomach and small intestines.; 4. Apana vata – governs all downward impulses (urination, elimination, menstruation, sexual discharges etc.) Located between the navel and the anus.; 5. Vyana vata – governs circulation, heart rhythm, locomotion. Centred in the heart and permeates through the whole body.	1. Pachaka pitta – governs digestion of food which is broken down into nutrients and waste. Located in the lower stomach and small intestine.; 2. Ranjaka pitta – governs formation of red blood cells. Gives colour to blood and stools. Located in the liver, gallbladder and spleen.; 3. Alochaka pitta – governs visual perception. Located in the eyes.; 4. Sadhaka pitta – governs emotions such as contentment, memory, intelligence and digestion of thoughts. Located in the heart.; 5. Bharajaka pitta – governs lustre and complexion, temperature and pigmentation of the skin. Located in the skin.	1. Kledaka kapha – governs moistening and liquefying of the food in the initial stages of digestion. Located in the upper part of the stomach.; 2. Avalambhaka kapha – governs lubrication of the heart and lungs. Provides strength to the back, chest and heart. Located in the chest, heart and lungs.; 3. Tarpaka kapha – governs calmness, happiness and stability. Nourishment of sense and motor organs. Located in the head, sinuses and cerebra-spinal fluid.; 4. Bodhaka kapha – governs perception of taste, lubricating and moistening of food. Located in the tongue, mouth and throat.; 5. Shleshaka kapha – governs lubrication of all joints. Located in the joints.

=== Prana, tejas, and ojas ===
Yoga is a set of disciplines, some that aim to balance and transform energies of the psyche. At the roots of vata, pitta and kapha are believed to consist of their subtle counterparts called prana, tejas and ojas. Unlike the doshas, which in excess create diseases, these are believed to promote health, creativity and well-being.

Doṣa	Bhūta Composition	Mānasa doṣa (guṇa)	Characteristic
Vāta	Vayu, Ākāśa	Sattva	Prana, the life force and healing energy of vata (air)
Pitta	Agni, Jala/Āpas	Rajas	Tejas, inner radiance and healing energy of pitta (fire)
Kapha	Pṛthvī, Jala/Āpas	Tamas	Ojas, the ultimate energy reserve of the body derived from kapha (water)

Ultimately, Ayurveda seeks to reduce disease, particularly those that are chronic, and increase positive health in the body and mind via these three vital essences that aid in renewal and transformation. Increased prana is associated with enthusiasm, adaptability and creativity, all of which are considered necessary when pursuing a spiritual path in yoga and to enable one to perform. Tejas is claimed to provide courage, fearlessness and insight and to be important when making decisions. Lastly, ojas is considered to create peace, confidence and patience to maintain consistent development and sustain continued effort. Eventually, the most important element to develop is ojas, believed to engender physical and psychological endurance. Aims to achieve this include Ayurvedic diet, tonic herbs, control of the senses, a devotion and most importantly celibacy.

== Criticism ==
Writing in the Skeptical Inquirer, Harriet Hall likened dosha to horoscope. She found that different online dosha websites gave different results in personalized quizzes, and summarized that "Ayurveda is basically superstition mixed with a soupçon of practical health advice." Professional practitioners of Ayurveda in the United States are certified by the National Ayurvedic Medical Association Certification Board, which advocates for the safe and effective practice of Ayurveda. Alternative medicines used in Ayurvedic treatments have been found to contain harmful levels of lead, mercury, and other heavy metals. Even some Ayurvedic scholars have expressed reservations about the Tridosha theory, arguing that it should be viewed as a useful framework rather than a definitive, universally applicable concept, and instead be employed as a heuristic tool to inform practice and decision-making.

== See also ==
- Traditional Tibetan medicine § Three principles of function
- Dhātu (Ayurveda)
