= Chinese alchemical elixir poisoning =

Deadly toxicity in elixers of immortality

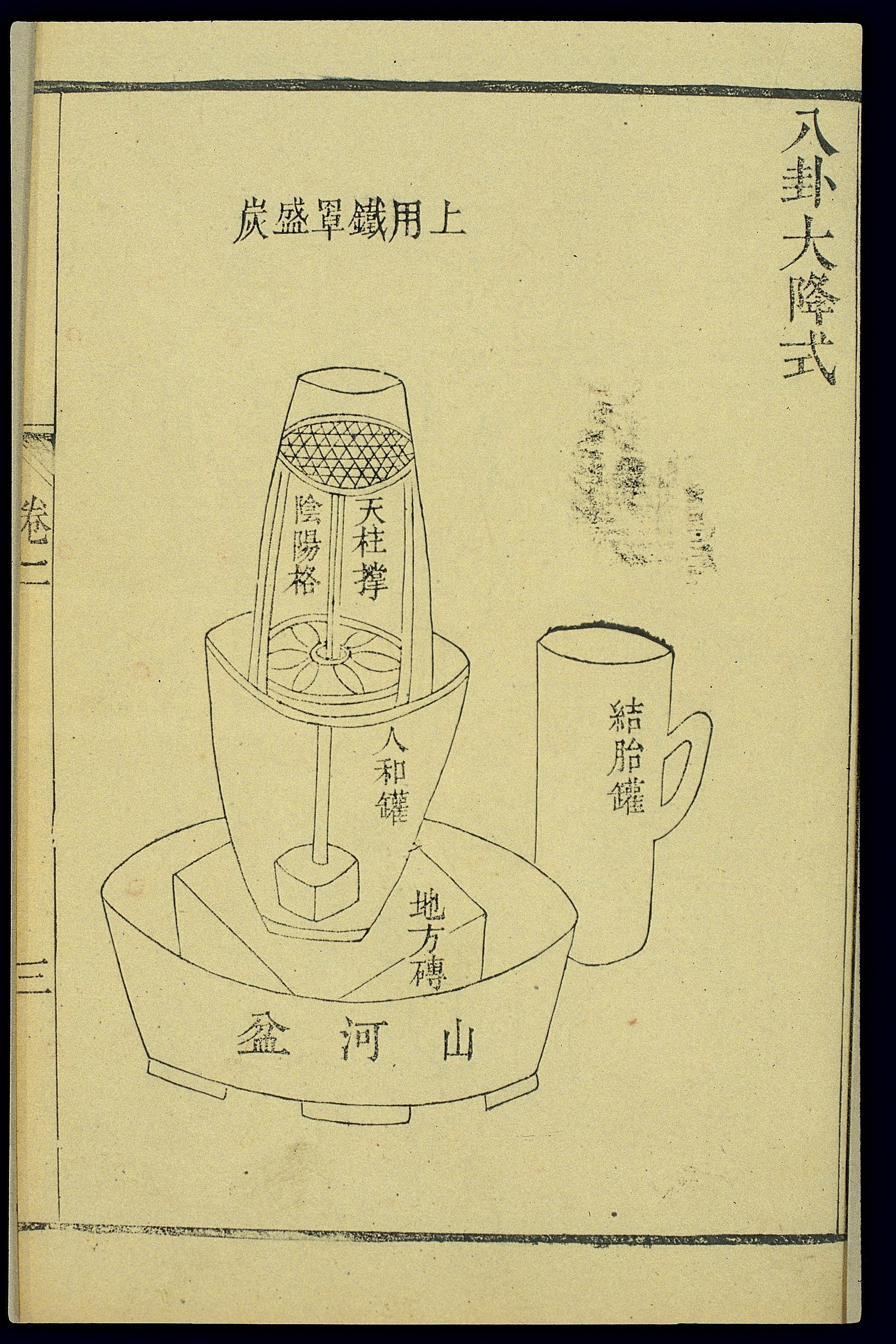
Chinese woodblock illustration of a waidan alchemical refining furnace, 1856 Waike tushuo 外科圖説 (Illustrated Manual of External Medicine)

In Chinese alchemy, elixir poisoning refers to the toxic effects from elixirs of immortality that contained metals and minerals such as mercury and arsenic. The official Twenty-Four Histories record numerous Chinese emperors, nobles, and officials who died from taking elixirs to prolong their lifespans. The first emperor to die from elixir poisoning was likely Qin Shi Huang (d. 210 BCE) and the last was the Yongzheng Emperor (d. 1735 CE). Despite common knowledge that immortality potions could be deadly, fangshi and Daoist alchemists continued the elixir-making practice for two millennia.

== Terminology ==
Dān 丹 "cinnabar; vermillion; elixir; alchemy" is the keyword for Chinese immortality elixirs. The red mineral cinnabar (dānshā 丹砂 lit. "cinnabar sand") was anciently used to produce the pigment vermilion (zhūhóng 朱紅) and the element mercury (shuǐyín 水銀 "watery silver" or gǒng 汞).

According to the ABC Etymological Dictionary of Old Chinese, the etymology of Modern Standard Chinese dān from Old Chinese *tān (< *tlan ?) 丹 "red; vermillion; cinnabar", gān 矸 in dāngān 丹矸 from *tân-kân (< *tlan-klan ?) "cinnabar; vermillion ore", and zhān from *tan 旃 "a red flag" derive from Proto-Kam-Sui *h-lan "red" or Proto-Sino-Tibetan *tja-n or *tya-n "red". The *t- initial and *t- or *k- doublets indicate that Old Chinese borrowed this item.

Oracle script for 丹 "cinnabar"

Although the word dan 丹 "cinnabar; red" frequently occurs in oracle script from the late Shang dynasty (c. 1600–1046 BCE) and bronzeware script and seal script from the Zhou dynasty (1045–256 BCE), paleographers disagree about the graphic origins of the logograph 丹 and its ancient variants 𠁿 and 𠕑. Early scripts combine a 丶 dot or ⼀ stroke (depicting a piece of cinnabar) in the middle of a surrounding frame, which is said to represent:

- jǐng 井 "well" represents the mine from which the cinnabar is taken"
- "the crucible of the Taoist alchemists"
- "the contents of a square receptacle"
- "placed in a tray or palette to be used as red pigment"
- "mineral powder on a stretched filter-cloth"

Many Chinese elixir names are compounds of dan, such as jīndān 金丹 (with "gold") meaning "golden elixir; elixir of immortality; potable gold" and xiāndān 仙丹 (with "Daoist immortal") "elixir of immortality; panacea", and shéndān 神丹 (with "spirit; god") "divine elixir". Bùsǐ zhī yào 不死之藥 "drug of deathlessness" was another early name for the elixir of immortality. Chinese alchemists would liàndān 煉丹 (with "smelt; refine") "concoct pills of immortality" using a dāndǐng 丹鼎 (with "tripod cooking vessel; cauldron") "furnace for concocting pills of immortality". In addition, the ancient Chinese believed that other substances provided longevity and immortality, notably the língzhī 靈芝 "Ganoderma mushroom".

The transformation from chemistry-based waidan 外丹 "external elixir/alchemy" to physiology-based neidan 內丹 "internal elixir/alchemy" gave new analogous meanings to old terms. The human body metaphorically becomes a ding "cauldron" in which the adept forges the Three Treasures (essence, life-force, and spirit) within the jindan Golden Elixir within the dāntián 丹田 (with "field") "lower part of the abdomen".

In early China, alchemists and pharmacists were one and the same. Traditional Chinese medicine also used less concentrated cinnabar and mercury preparations, and dan means "pill; medicine" in general, for example, dānfāng 丹方 semantically changed from "prescription for elixir of immortality" to "medical prescription". Dan was lexicalized into medical terms such as dānjì 丹劑 "pill preparation" and dānyào 丹藥 "pill medicine".

The Chinese names for immortality elixirs have parallels in other cultures and languages, for example, Indo-Iranian soma or haoma, Sanskrit amrita, and Greek ambrosia.

== History ==
In Chinese history, the alchemical practice of concocting elixirs of immortality from metallic and mineral substances began circa the 4th century BCE in the late Warring states period, reached a peak in the 9th century CE Tang dynasty when five emperors died, and, despite common knowledge of the dangers, elixir poisoning continued until the 18th century Qing dynasty.

=== Warring States period ===
The earliest mention of alchemy in China occurs in connection with fangshi ("masters of the methods") specialists in cosmological and esoteric arts employed by rulers from the 4th century BCE.

The 3rd-century BCE Zhanguo Ce and Han Feizi both record a story about King Qingxiang of Chu (r. 298–263 BCE) being presented a busi zhi yao 不死之藥 "immortality medicine". As the chamberlain was taking the elixir into the palace, a guard asked if it was edible and when he answered yes, the guard grabbed and ate it. The king was angered and condemned the guard to death. A friend of the guard tried to persuade the king, saying, "After all the guard did ask the chamberlain whether it could be eaten before he ate it. Hence the blame attaches to the chamberlain and not to him. Besides what the guest presented was an elixir of life, but if you now execute your servant after eating it, it will be an elixir of death (and the guest will be a liar). Now rather than killing an innocent officer in order to demonstrate a guest's false claim, it would be better to release the guard." This logic convinced the king to let the guard live.

=== Qin dynasty ===
Qin Shi Huang, the founder of the Qin dynasty (221–206 BCE), feared death and spent the last part of his life seeking the elixir of life. This led to later allegations that he died from elixir poisoning. The first emperor also sent Xu Fu to sail an expeditionary fleet into the Pacific seeking the legendary Mount Penglai where the busi zhi shu 不死之樹 "tree of deathlessness" grew, but they never returned.

=== Han dynasty ===
Interest in elixirs of immortality increased during the Han dynasty (206 BC–220 AD). Emperor Wu (156–87 BCE) employed many fangshi alchemists who claimed they could produce the legendary substance. The Book of Han says that around 133 BCE the fangshi Li Shaojun said to Emperor Wu, "Sacrifice to the stove [zao 竈] and you will be able to summon ' things ' [i.e. spirits]. Summon spirits and you will be able to change cinnabar powder into yellow gold. With this yellow gold you may make vessels to eat and drink out of. You will then increase your span of life. Having increased your span of life, you will be able to see the [xian 仙] of [Penglai] that is in the midst of the sea. Then you may perform the sacrifices feng [封] and shan [禅], and escape death".

Wei Boyang's c. 142 Cantong qi, which is regarded as the oldest complete alchemical book extant in any culture, influenced developments in elixir alchemy. It listed mercury and lead as the prime ingredients for elixirs, which limited later potential experiments and resulted in numerous cases of poisoning. It is quite possible that "many of the most brilliant and creative alchemists fell victim to their own experiments by taking dangerous elixirs". There is a famous story about animal testing of elixirs by Wei Boyang. Wei entered the mountains to prepare the elixir of immortality, accompanied by three disciples, two of whom were skeptical. When the alchemy was completed he said, "Although the gold elixir is now accomplished we ought first to test it by feeding it to a white dog. If the dog can fly after taking it then it is edible for man; if the dog dies then it is not." The dog fell over and died, but Wei and his disciple Yu took the medicine and immediately died, after which the two cautious disciples fled. Wei and Yu later revived, rejoiced in their faith, took more of the elixir and became immortals.

Elixir ingestion is first mentioned in the c. 81 BCE Discourses on Salt and Iron.

=== Six dynasties ===
During the turbulent Six dynasties period (220–589), self-experimentation with drugs became commonplace, and many people tried taking poisonous elixirs of immortality as well as the psychoactive drug Cold-Food Powder. At this time, Daoist alchemists began to record the often fatal side effects of elixirs. In an unusual case of involuntary elixir poisoning, Empress Jia Nanfeng (257–300) was forced to commit suicide by drinking "jinxiaojiu" 金屑酒 "wine with gold fragments".

The Daoist scholar Ge Hong's c. 320 Baopuzi lists 56 chemical preparations and elixirs, 8 of which were poisonous, with visions from mercury poisoning the most commonly reported symptom.

The individuals who experimented with Six Dynasties alchemy often had different understandings and intentions. A single alchemical formula could be interpreted as being "suicidal, therapeutic, or symbolic and contemplative", and its implementation might be "a unique, decisive event or a repeated, ritual phantasmagoria".

Emperor Ai of Jin (r. 361–365) died at the age of twenty-five, as the result of his desire to avoid growing old. The Book of Jin says the emperor practiced bigu "grain avoidance" and consumed alchemical elixirs, but was poisoned from an overdose and "no longer knew what was going on around him". In a sardonic sense, the emperor fulfilled his desire since the elixir "did actually prevent him from growing any older".

Emperor Daowu (r. 371–409), founder of the Northern Wei dynasty, was cautiously interested in alchemy and used condemned criminals for clinical trials of immortality elixirs (like Mithridates VI of Pontus r. 120–63 BCE). The Book of Wei records that in 400, he instituted the office of the Royal Alchemist, built an imperial laboratory for the preparation of drugs and elixirs, and reserved the Western mountains for the supply of firewood (used in the alchemical furnaces). "Furthermore, he ordered criminals who had been sentenced to death to test (the products) against their will. Many of them died and (the experiments gave) no decisive result."

Many texts from the Six dynasties period specifically warned about the toxicity of elixirs. For instance, the Shangqing School Daoist pharmacologist Tao Hongjing's 499 Zhen'gao (真誥, Declarations of the Perfected) describes taking a White Powder elixir.

When you have taken a spatulaful of it, you will feel an intense pain in your heart, as if you had been stabbed there with a knife. After three days you will want to drink, and when you have drunk a full hu 斛 [about 50 liters] your breath will be cut off. When that happens, it will mean that you are dead. When your body has been laid out, it will suddenly disappear, and only your clothing will remain. Thus you will be an immortal released in broad daylight by means of his waistband. If one knows the name of the drug [or, perhaps, the secret names of its ingredients] he will not feel the pain in his heart, but after he has drunk a full hu he will still die. When he is dead, he will become aware that he has left his corpse below him on the ground. At the proper time, jade youths and maidens will come with an azure carriage to take it away. If one wishes to linger on in the world, he should strictly regulate his drinking during the three days when he feels the pain in his heart. This formula may be used by the whole family.

Within this context, Strickmann says a prospective Daoist alchemist must have been strongly motivated by faith and a firm confidence in his posthumous destiny, in effect, "he would be committing suicide by consecrated means." Tao Hongjing's disciple Zhou Ziliang 周子良 (497–516) had repeated visions of Maoshan divinities who said his destiny was to become an immortal, and instructed him to commit ritual suicide with a poisonous elixir composed of mushrooms and cinnabar. In 517, Tao edited the Zhoushi mingtong ji 周氏冥通記 (Records of Mr. Zhou's Communications with the Unseen) detailing his disciples visions.

The Liang dynasty founder Emperor Wu (r. 502–549) was cautious about taking elixirs of immortality. He and Tao Hongjing were old friends, and the History of the Southern Dynasties says the emperor requested him to study elixir alchemy. After Tao had learned the secret art of making elixirs, he was worried about the shortage of materials. "So the emperor supplied him with gold, cinnabar, copper sulphate, realgar, and so forth. When the process was accomplished the elixirs had the appearance of frost and snow and really did make the body feel lighter. The emperor took an elixir and found it effective." Tao spent his last years working on different elixirs and presented three to the emperor, who had refused immortality elixirs from Deng Yu 鄧郁 (who claimed to have lived 30 years without food, only consuming pieces of mica in stream water).

Emperor Wenxuan (r. 550–559) of the Northern Qi dynasty was an early skeptic about immortality elixirs. He ordered alchemists to make the jiuhuan jindan 九還金丹 (Ninefold Cyclically Transformed Elixir), which he kept in a jade box, and explained, "I am still too fond of the pleasures of the world to take flight to the heavens immediately—I intend to consume the elixir only when I am about to die".

=== Tang dynasty ===
At least five Tang dynasty (618–907) emperors were incapacitated and killed by immortality elixirs. In historic recurrences, the newly enthroned emperor understandably executed the Daoist alchemists whose elixirs had killed his predecessor, and then subsequently came to believe in other charlatans enough to consume their poisonous elixirs.

Emperor Xianzong (r. 805–820) indirectly lost his life due to elixir poisoning. The Xu Tongzhi (Supplement to the Historical Collections) says, "Deluded by the sayings of the alchemists, [Xianzong] ingested gold elixirs and his behaviour became very abnormal. He was easily offended by those officials whom he daily met, and thus the prisons were left with little vacant space." In response, an official wrote an 819 memorial to the throne that said:

Of late years, however, (the capital) has been overrun by a host of pharmacists and alchemists ... recommending one another right and left with ever wilder and more extravagant claims. Now if there really were immortals, and scholars possessing the Tao, would they not conceal their names and hide themselves in mountain recesses far from the ken of man? ... The medicines of the sages of old were meant to cure bodily illnesses, and were not meant to be taken constantly like food. How much less so these metallic and mineral substances which are full of burning poison! ... Of old, as the Li Chi says, when the prince took physic, his minister tasted it first, and when a parent was sick, his son did likewise. Ministers and sons are in the same position. I humbly pray that all those persons who have elixirs made from transformed metals and minerals, and also those who recommend them, may be compelled to consume (their own elixirs) first for the space of one year. Such an investigation will distinguish truth from falsehood, and automatically clarify the matter by experiment.

After the emperor rejected this appeal, the palace eunuchs Wang Shoucheng and Chen Hongzhi 陳弘志 assassinated him in 820.

When Xianzong's son and successor Emperor Muzong (r. 820–824) came to the throne, he executed the alchemists who had poisoned his father, but later began to take immortality elixirs himself. An official wrote Muzong an 823 memorial that warned:

Medicines are for use against illnesses, and should not be taken as food. ... Even when one is ill medicines must be used with great circumspection; how much more so when one is not ill. If this is true for the common people how much more so will it be for the emperor! Your imperial predecessor believed the nonsense of the alchemists and thus became ill; this your majesty already knows only too well. How could your majesty still repeat the same mistake?

The emperor appreciated this reasoning but soon afterwards fell ill and died from poisoning. Palace eunuchs supposedly used poisonous elixirs to assassinate Muzong's young successor Emperor Jingzong (r. 824–827).

The next Tang emperor to die from elixir poisoning was Wuzong (r. 840–846). According to the Old Book of Tang, "The emperor [Wuzong] favoured alchemists, took some of their elixirs, cultivated the arts of longevity and personally accepted (Taoist) talismans. The medicines made him very irritable, losing all normal self-control in joy or anger; finally when his illness took a turn for the worse he could not speak for ten days at a time." Chancellor Li Deyu and others requested audiences with the emperor, but he refused and subsequently died in 846.

Wuzong's successor Emperor Xuānzong (r. 846–859) astonishingly also died of elixir poisoning. Xuānzong made himself the patron of some Daoists who concocted immortality elixirs of vegetable origin, possibly because his nephew Wuzong had died from metallic and mineral elixir poisoning. The New Book of Tang records that the emperor received a wine tincture of ivy (常春藤, Hedera helix) that the Daoist adept Jiang Lu 姜攎 claimed would turn white hair black and provide longevity. However, when the emperor heard that many people died a violent death after drinking ivy tincture, he stopped taking it. Jiang was publicly shamed and the emperor granted his request to search in the mountains for the right plant, but he never appeared again. According to the 890 Dongguan zuoji (Record of Memorials from the Eastern Library), "A medical official, Li [Xuanbo], presented to the emperor [Xuanzong] cinnabar which had been heated and subdued by fire, in order to gain favour from him. Thus the ulcerous disease of the emperor was all attributable to his crime".

Besides emperors, many Tang literati were interested in alchemy. Both Li Bai and Bai Juyi wrote poems about the Cantong qi and alchemical elixirs. Other poets, including Meng Haoran, Liu Yuxi, and Liu Zongyuan also referred to elixir compounding in their works.

The influential Tang physician and alchemist Sun Simiao's c. 640 alchemical Taiqing zhenren dadan 太清真人大丹 (Great Purity Essentials of Elixir Manuals for Oral Transmission) recommends 14 elixir formulas he found successful, most of which seem poisonous, containing mercury and lead, if not arsenic, as ingredients. Sun's medical c. 659 Qianjin yifang 千金要方 (Supplement to the Thousand Golden Remedies) categorically states that mercury, realgar, orpiment, sulphur, gold, silver, and vitriol are poisonous, but prescribed them in much larger amounts for elixirs than for medicines. In contrast to drinking soluble arsenic (as in groundwater), when powdered arsenic is eaten "astonishing degrees of tolerance can be achieved", and Sun Simiao might have thought that when human beings reached to a level "approaching that of the immortals their bodies would no longer be susceptible to poison".

Tang alchemists were well aware of elixir poisoning. The c. 8th–9th century Zhenyuan miaodao yaolüe 真元妙道要略 (Synopsis of the Essentials of the Mysterious Dao of the True Origin) lists 35 common mistakes in elixir preparation: cases where people died from eating elixirs made from cinnabar, mercury, lead, and silver; cases where people suffered from boils on the head and sores on the back by ingesting cinnabar prepared by roasting together mercury and sulphur, and cases where people became seriously ill through drinking melted "liquid lead". The c. 850 Xuanjie lu 玄解錄 (Record of Mysterious Antidotes)—which is notable as the world's oldest printed book on a scientific subject—recommends a potent herbal composition that serves both as an elixir and as an antidote for common elixir poisoning. The procedure to make Shouxian wuzi wan 守仙五子丸 (Five-herbs Immortality-safeguarding Pills) is to take 5 ounces each of Indian gooseberry, wild raspberry, dodder, five-flavor berry, and broadleaf plantain and pound them into flour. Mix it with boxthorn juice and false daisy juice and dry. Heat almonds and good wine in a silver vessel, and add foxglove, tofu, and "deer glue". Combine this with the five herbs, and dry into small pills. The usual dosage is 30 pills a day taken with wine, but one should avoid eating pork, garlic, mustard, and turnips when taking the medicine.

During the Tang period, Chinese alchemists divided into two schools of thought about elixir poisoning. The first altogether ignored the poison danger and considered the unpleasant symptoms after taking an elixir as signs of its efficacy. The c. 6th century Taiqing shibi ji 太清石壁記 (Records of the Rock Chamber) described away the side effects and recommended methods of bringing relief.

After taking an elixir, if your face and body itch as though insects were crawling over them, if your hands and feet swell dropsically, if you cannot stand the smell of food and bring it up after you have eaten it, if you feel as though you were going to be sick most of the time, if you experience weakness in the four limbs, if you have to go often to the latrine, or if your head or stomach violently ache—do not be alarmed or disturbed. All these effects are merely proofs that the elixir you are taking is successfully dispelling your latent disorders.

Many of these symptoms are characteristic of acute metal toxicity in general and mercury poisoning in particular: formication, edema, and weakness of the extremities, later leading to infected boils and ulcers, nausea, vomiting, gastric and abdominal pain, diarrhea, and headaches. For relieving the side-effects when the elixir takes effect, the Taiqing shibi ji recommends that one should take hot and cold baths, and drink a mixture of scallion, soy sauce, and wine. If that does not bring relief, then one should combine and boil a hornets' nest, spurge, Solomon's seal, and ephedra into a medicine and take one dose.

The second school of alchemists, admitted that some metal and mineral elixir constituents were poisonous and tried either to neutralize them or to replace them with less dangerous herbal substances. For instance, the 8th-century Zhang zhenren jinshi lingsha lun 張真人金石靈沙論 (The Adept Zhang's Discourse on Metals, Minerals, and Cinnabar) emphasized the poisonous nature of gold, silver, lead, mercury, and arsenic, and described witnessing many cases of premature death brought about by consuming cinnabar. Zhang believed however that the poisons could be rendered harmless by properly choosing and combining adjuvant and complimentary ingredients; for example gold should always be used together with mercury, while silver can only be used when combined with gold, copper carbonate, and realgar for the preparation of the jindan Golden Elixir. Many Tang alchemical writers returned to the fashion of using obscure synonyms for ingredients, perhaps because of the alarming number of elixir poisonings, and the desire to dissuade amateur alchemists from experimenting on themselves. By the end of the Yuan dynasty (1271–1368), the more cautious alchemists had generally changed the elixirs ingredients from minerals and metals to plants and animals.

The late Tang or early Song Huangdi jiuding shendan jingjue 黄帝九鼎神丹經訣 (Explanation of the Yellow Emperor's Manual of the Nine-Vessel Magical Elixir) says, "The ancient masters (lit. sages) all attained longevity and preserved their lives (lit. bones) by consuming elixirs. But later disciples (lit. scholars) have suffered loss of life and decay of their bones as the result of taking them." The treatise explains the secret ancient methods for rendering elixir ingredients harmless by treating them with wine made from chastetree leaves and roots, or with saltpeter and vinegar. Another method of supposedly removing the poison from mercury was to put it in three-year-old wine, add sal ammoniac and boil it for 100 days.

=== Five dynasties ===
Two rulers died from elixir poisoning during the Five Dynasties period (907–979) of political turmoil after the overthrow of the Tang dynasty. Zhu Wen or Emperor Taizu (r. 907–912), the founder of the Later Liang dynasty, became seriously incapacitated as a result of elixir poisoning, and fell victim to an assassination plot. Li Bian or Emperor Liezu (r. 937–943), the founder of the Southern Tang kingdom, took immortality elixirs that made him irritable and deathly ill.

The Daoist adept Chen Tuan (d. 989) advised two emperors that they should not worry about elixirs but direct their minds to improving the state administration, Chai Rong or Emperor Shizong of Later Zhou in 956, and then Emperor Taizu of Song in 976.

=== Song dynasty ===
After its heyday in the Tang dynasty Daoist alchemy continued to flourish during the Song dynasty (960–1279) period. However, since six Tang emperors and many court officials died from elixir poisoning, Song alchemists exercised more caution, not only in the composition of the elixirs themselves, but also in attempts to find pharmaceutical methods of counteracting the toxic effects. The number of ingredients used in elixir formulas was reduced and there was a tendency to return to the ancient and difficult terminology of the Cantongqi, perhaps to conceal the processes from rash and ignorant operators. Psycho-physiological neidan alchemy became steadily more popular than laboratory waidan alchemy.

During the Song dynasty, the practice of consuming metallic elixirs was not confined to the imperial court and expanded to anyone wealthy enough to pay. The author and official Ye Mengde (1077–1148) described how two of his friends had died from elixirs of immortality in one decade. First, Lin Yanzhen, who boasted about his health and muscular strength, took an elixir for three years, "Whereupon ulcers developed in his chest, first near the hairs as large as rice-grains, then after a couple of days his neck swelled up so that chin and chest seemed continuous." Lin died after ten months of suffering, and his doctors discovered cinnabar powder had accumulated in his pus and blood. Second, whenever Xie Renbo "heard of anyone who had some cinnabar subdued by fire he went after it, caring nothing about the distance, and his only fear was that he would not have enough." He also developed ulcers on the chest. Although his friends noticed changes in his appearance and behavior, Xie did not recognize that he had been poisoned, "till suddenly it came upon him like a storm of wind and rain, and he died in a single night".

The scientist and statesman Shen Kuo's 1088 Dream Pool Essays suggested that mercury compounds might be medicinally valuable and needed further study—foreshadowing the use of metallic compounds in modern medicine, such as mercury in salvarsan for syphilis or antimony for visceral leishmaniasis. Shen says his cousin once transformed cinnabar into an elixir, but one of his students mistakenly ate a leftover piece, became delirious, and died the next day.

Now cinnabar is an extremely good drug and can be taken even by a newborn baby, but once it has been changed by heat it can kill an (adult) person. If we consider the change and transformation of opposites into one another, since (cinnabar) can be changed into a deadly poison why should it not also be changed into something of extreme benefit? Since it can change into something which kills, there is good reason to believe that it may have the pattern-principle [li] of saving life; it is simply that we have not yet found out the art (of doing this). Thus we cannot deny the possibility of the existence of methods for transforming people into feathered immortals, but we have to be very careful about what we do.

Su Shi (1037–1101), the Song dynasty scholar and pharmacologist, was familiar with the life-prolonging claims of alchemists, but wrote in a letter that, "I have recently received some cinnabar (elixir) which shows a most remarkable colour, but I cannot summon up enough courage to try it".

The forensic medical expert Song Ci was familiar with the effects of metal poisoning, and his c. 1235 Collected Cases of Injustice Rectified handbook for coroners gives a test for mercury poisoning: plunge a piece of gold into the intestine or tissues and see if a superficial amalgam forms. He also describes the colic, cramps, and discharge of blood from arsenic poisoning, and gives several antidotes including emetics.

=== Ming dynasty ===
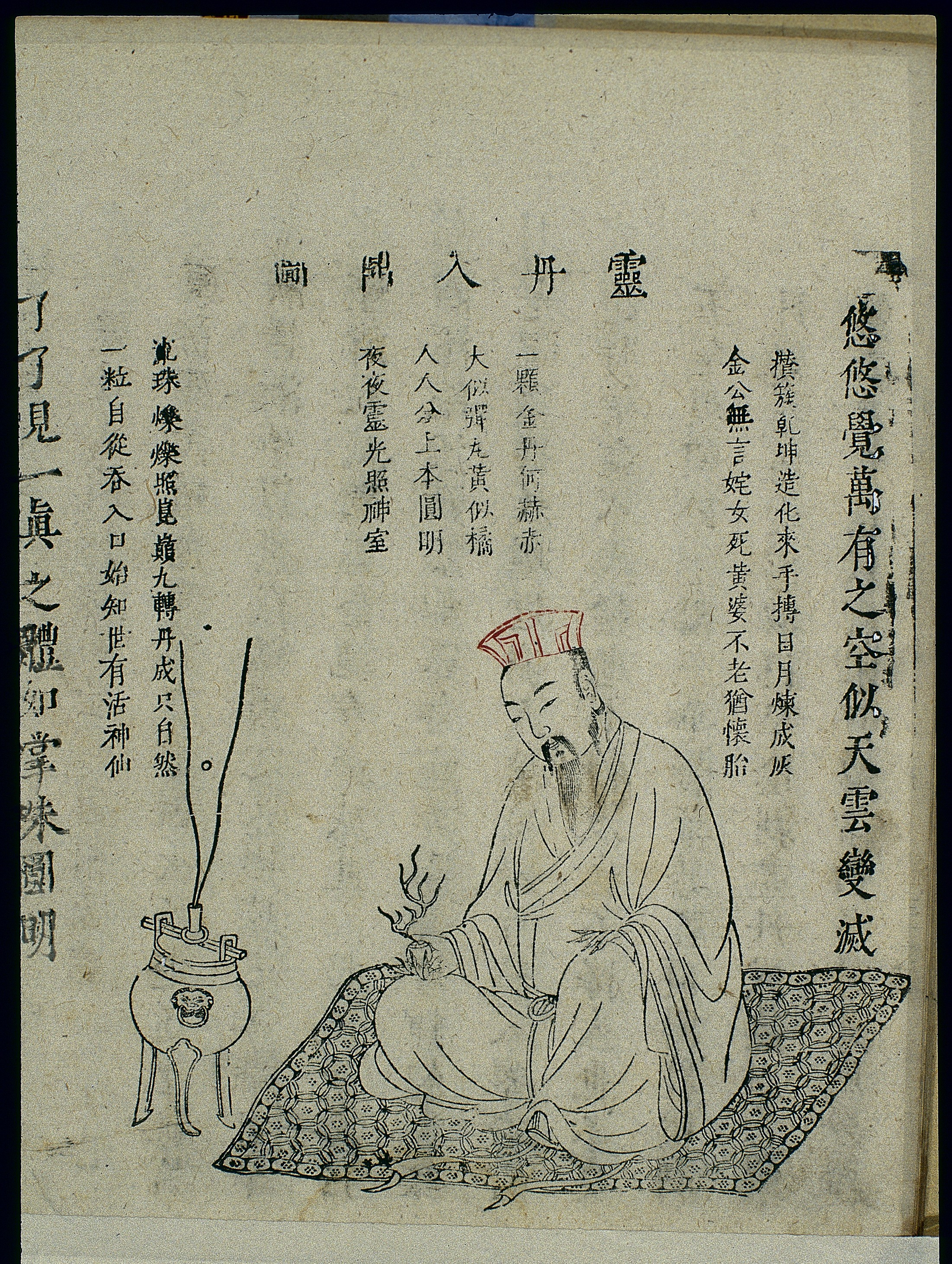
Chinese woodblock illustration of a neidan practice "Putting the miraculous elixir into the ding tripod", 1615 Xingming guizhi (Pointers on Spiritual Nature and Bodily Life)

Ming dynasty (1368–1644) authorities strongly disapproved of immortality elixirs, but the Jiajing Emperor (r. 1521–1567) supposedly died from consuming them. The emperor was interested in the art of immortality and put great confidence in Daoist physicians, magicians, and alchemists. One named Wang Jin 王金, who was appointed a Physician-in-Attendance in the Imperial Academy of Medicine, convinced the emperor that eating and drinking from vessels made of alchemical gold and silver would bring about immortality, but it only resulted in his death. Wang fled but was caught and exiled to the frontiers in 1570.

Li Shizhen's classic 1578 Compendium of Materia Medica discusses the historical tradition of producing gold and cinnabar elixirs, and concludes, "(the alchemists) will never realise that the human body, which thrives on water and the cereals, is unable to sustain such heavy substances as gold and other minerals within the stomach and intestines for any length of time. How blind it is, in the pursuit of longevity, to lose one's life instead!". In another section, Li criticizes alchemists and pharmacologists for perpetuating the belief in mercury elixirs.

I am not able to tell the number of people who since the Six Dynasties period (3rd to 6th centuries) so coveted life that they took (mercury), but all that happened was that they impaired their health permanently or lost their lives. I need not bother to mention the alchemists, but I cannot bear to see these false statements made in pharmacopoeias. However, while mercury is not to be taken orally, its use as a medicine must not be ignored.

=== Qing dynasty ===
The Qing dynasty Yongzheng Emperor (r. 1722–1735) was the last Chinese ruler known to die from elixir poisoning. He was a superstitious man, affected by portents and omens, and a firm believer in Daoist longevity techniques. Taking immortality elixirs is thought to have caused his sudden death in 1735.

=== Historical interpretations ===
The Chinese tradition of using toxic heavy metals in elixirs of immortality has historical parallels in Ayurvedic medicine. Rasa shastra is the practice of adding metals and minerals to herbal medicines, rasayana is an alchemical tradition that used mercury and cinnabar for lengthening lifespan, raseśvara is a tradition that advocated the use of mercury to make the body immortal, and samskara is a process said to detoxify heavy metals and toxic herbs.

The historians of Chinese science Joseph Needham and Ho Peng-Yoke wrote a seminal article about poisonous alchemical elixirs. Based upon early Chinese descriptions of elixir poisoning, they decisively demonstrated a close correspondence with the known medical symptoms of mercury poisoning, lead poisoning, and arsenic poisoning. Compare the historical descriptions of Jin Emperor Ai (d. 365) who "no longer knew what was going on around him" and Tang Emperor Wuzong (d. 846) who was "very irritable, losing all normal self-control in joy or anger ... he could not speak for ten days at a time" with the distinctive psychological effects of mercury poisoning: progressing from "abnormal irritability to idiotic, melancholic, or manic conditions". Needham and his collaborators further discussed elixir poisoning in the Science and Civilisation in China series.

Although Chinese elixir poisoning may lead some to dismiss Chinese alchemy as another example of human follies in history, Ho Peng-Yoke and F. Peter Lisowski note its positive aspect upon Chinese medicine. The caution given to elixir poisoning later led Chinese alchemy to "shade imperceptibly" into iatrochemistry, the preparation of medicine by chemical methods, "in other words chemotherapy".

A recent study found that Chinese emperors lived comparatively short lives, with a mean age at death of emperors at 41.3, which was significantly lower than that of Buddhist monks at 66.9 and traditional Chinese doctors at 75.1. Causes of imperial death were natural disease (66.4%), homicide (28.2%), drug toxicity (3.3%), and suicide (2.1%). Homicide resulted in a significantly lower age of death (mean age 31.1) than disease (45.6), suicide (38.8), or drug toxicity (43.1, mentioning Qin Shi Huang taking mercury pills of immortality). Lifestyles seem to have been a determining factor, and 93.2% of the emperors studied were overindulgent in drinking alcohol, sexual activity, or both. The study does not refer to the Chinese belief that the arsenic sulphides realgar and orpiment, frequently used in immortality elixirs, had aphrodisiac properties.

== Hypothetical explanations ==
A significant question remains unanswered. If the insidious dangers of alchemical elixir poisoning were common knowledge, why did people continue to consume them for centuries? Joseph Needham and his collaborators suggested three hypothetical explanations, and Michel Strickmann proposed another.

=== Initial exhilaration ===
Needham and Lu's first explanation is that many alchemical mineral preparations were capable of giving an "initial exhilaration" or transient sense of well-being, usually involving weight loss and increased libido. These preliminary tonic effects could have acted as a kind of "bait" inveigling an elixir-taker deeper into substance intoxication, even to the point of death. Chinese medical texts recorded that realgar (arsenic disulphide) and orpiment (arsenic trisulphide) were aphrodisiacs and stimulated fertility, while cinnabar and sulphur elixirs increased longevity, averted hunger, and "lightened the body" (namely, qīngshēn 輕身, which is a common description of elixir effects).

Wine, as mentioned above, was both prescribed to be drunk when taking elixir pills and to relieve the unpleasant side-effects of elixir poisoning. Needham and Lu further suggest the possibility that elixir alchemy included hallucinogenic drugs, tentatively identifying the busi zhi yao 不死之藥 "drug of deathlessness" as fly-agaric and busi zhi shu 不死之樹 "tree of deathlessness" as birch. The elixir that Tao Hongjing's disciple Zhou Ziliang took to commit suicide "probably had hallucinogenic and toxic mushrooms". In the present day, realgar wine is traditionally consumed as part of the Dragon Boat Festival.

=== Incorruptibility ===
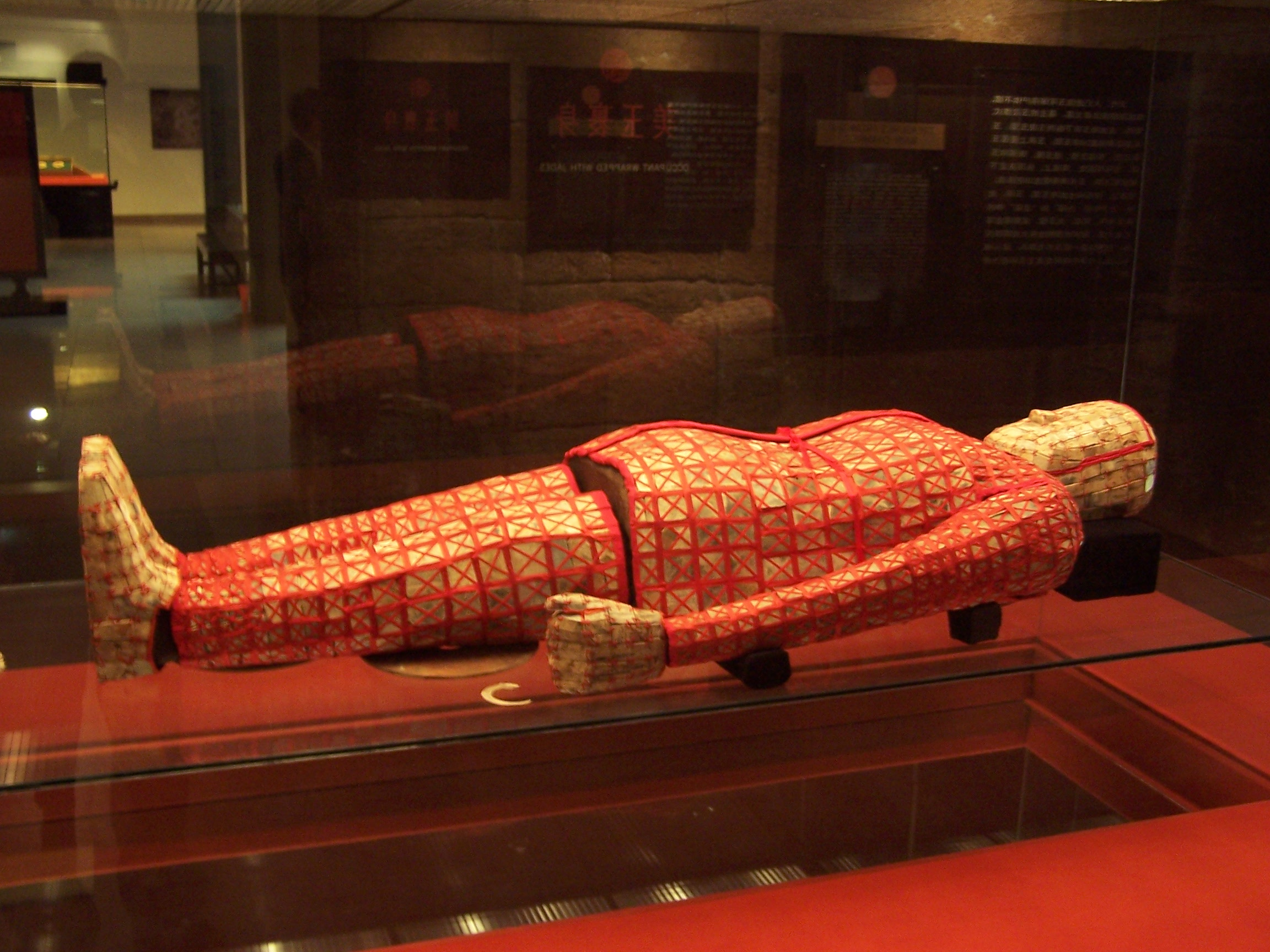
Jade burial suit of Nanyue King Zhao Mo (d. 122 BCE)

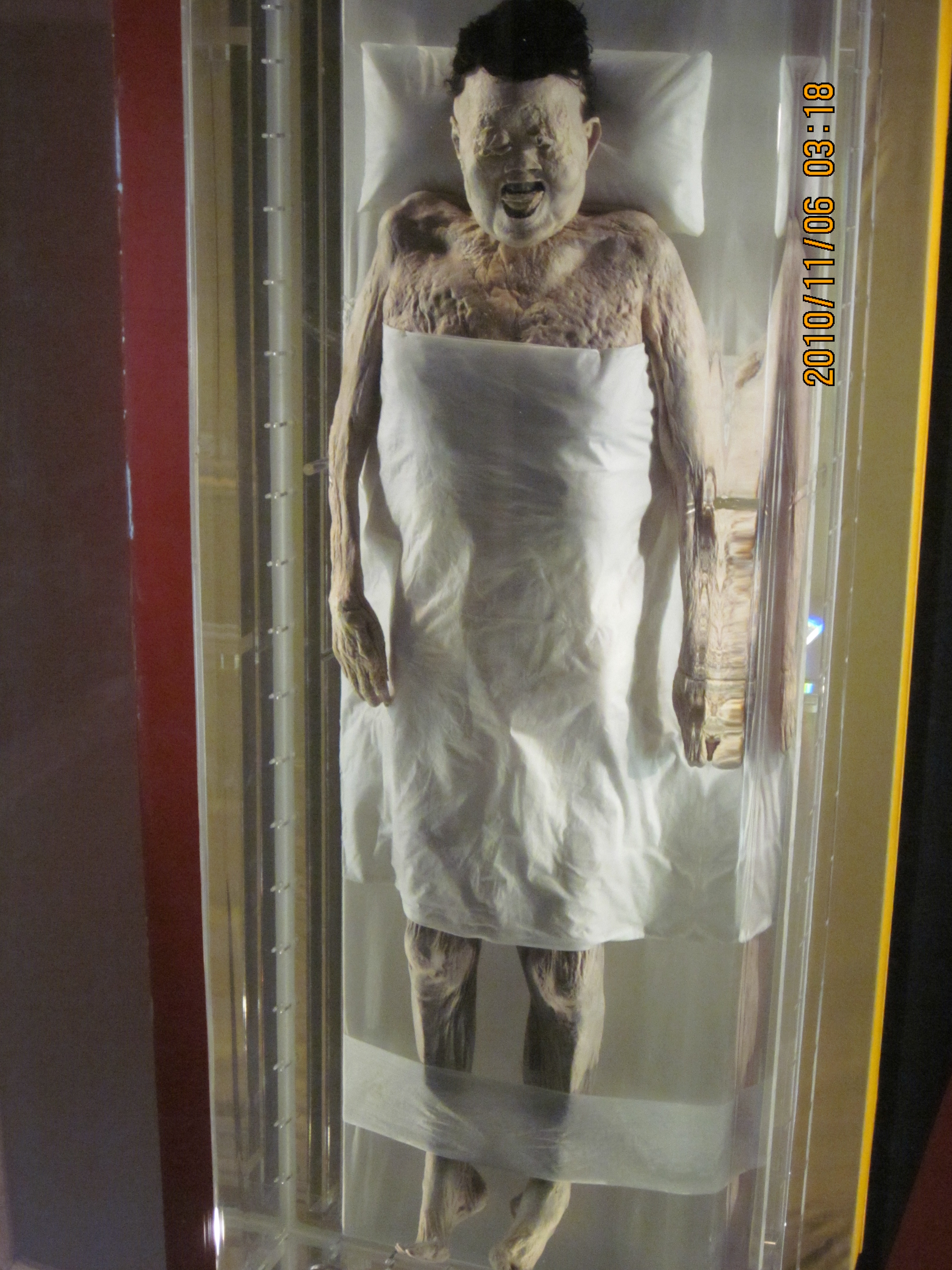
The preserved body of Xin Zhui (d. 163 BCE)

The apparent incorruptibility of an elixir-taker's corpse is Needham and Lu's second explanation for the persistent belief in immortality elixirs. They suggest that in some cases a body did not decompose because the deceased had died from mercury or arsenic poisoning, which is forensically known to often preserve a corpse from decay. For a believer in Daoist immortality drugs, even when an elixir-taker had unmistakably died, if the corpse was comparatively undecomposed, that could be interpreted as proof that the adept had become a xian immortal, as well as evidence for the alchemical elixir's efficacy.

Terminal incorruptibility was an ancient Chinese belief associated with jade, gold, and cinnabar. The Baopuzi says, "When gold and jade are inserted into the nine orifices, corpses do not decay. When salt and brine are absorbed into flesh and marrow, dried meats do not spoil. So when men ingest substances which are able to benefit their bodies and lengthen their days, why should it be strange that (some of these) should confer life perpetual?" The abolition of decay was believed to demonstrate the power of elixirs, "the corruptible had put on incorruptibility". Chinese jade burial suits are a better known example of using a mineral to preserve corpses.

There is a possibility that Sun Simiao (above) died from taking mercury elixirs. According to Sun's hagiography in the 10th-century Xuxian zhuan 續仙傳 (Further Biographies of the Immortals), after his death in 682 there was no visible sign of putrefaction, "After more than a month had passed there was no change in his appearance, and when the corpse was raised to be placed in the coffin it was as light as (a bundle of) empty clothes".

The incorruptibility stories about elixir users were not all myth, and recent archeological evidence showed that the ancient Chinese knew how "to achieve an almost perpetual conservation". The 1972 excavation of a tomb at Mawangdui discovered the extremely well-preserved body of Xin Zhui or Lady Dai, which resembled that of "a person who had died only a week or two before". A subsequent autopsy on her corpse found "abnormally high levels" of mercury and lead in her internal organs.

=== Temporary death ===
Needham and Lu's third justification for taking poisonous elixirs is a drug-induced "temporary death", possibly a trance or coma. In the classic legend (above) about Wei Boyang drinking an elixir of immortality, he appears to die, subsequently revives, and takes more elixir to achieve immortality.

The Baopuzi describes a Five Mineral-based multicolored Ninefold Radiance Elixir that can bring a corpse back to life: "If you wish to raise a body that has not been dead for fully three days, bathe the corpse with a solution of one spatula of the blue elixir, open its mouth, and insert another spatula full; it will revive immediately.".

A Tang Daoist text prescribes taking an elixir in doses half the size of a millet grain, but adds, "If one is sincerely determined, and dares to take a whole spatula-full all at once, one will temporarily die [zànsǐ 暫死] for half a day or so, and then be restored to life like someone waking from sleep. This however is perilous in the extreme".

=== Ritual suicide ===
Michel Strickmann, a scholar of Daoist and Buddhist studies, analyzed the well-documented Shangqing School's alchemy in the Maoshan revelations and in the life of Tao Hongjing, and concluded that scholars need to reexamine the Western stereotype of "accidental elixir poisoning" that supposedly applied to "misguided alchemists and their unwitting imperial patrons". Since Six Dynasties and Tang period Daoist literature thoroughly, "even rapturously", described the deadly toxic qualities of many elixirs, Strickmann proposed that some of the recorded alchemical deaths were intentional ritual suicide. Two reviewers disagreed about Strickmann's conclusions. The first questions why he defends the logic of alchemical suicide rather than simply accepting the idea of accidental elixir poisoning, and says Tao Hongjing never experimented with alchemy seriously enough to achieve suicide himself—but fails to mention Strickmann's prime example: Tao's disciple Zhou Ziliang whom Shangqing deities reportedly instructed to prepare a poisonous elixir and commit suicide in order to achieve immortality. The second describes Strickmann's chapter as "one of the most thorough and useful" in the volume, and says he proves that it is "almost ludicrous to assume that a Taoist (commoner or emperor) could have died from accidental elixir poisoning".

== See also ==
- Mercury poisoning
- Processing (Chinese materia medica)
- Raseśvara, school of Indian philosophy that advocated consuming mercury to achieve immortality
- Rasayana, school of Indian alchemy that advocated consuming mercury for lengthening lifespan
- Rasashastra
