= Raseśvara =

Shaiva philosophical tradition

- Samkhya: Kapila
- Yoga: Patanjali
- Vaisheshika: Kaṇāda, Prashastapada
- Secular: Valluvar

Raseśvara was a Shaiva philosophical tradition which "arose about the commencement of the Christian era" (1st century CE). It advocated the use of mercury to make the body immortal. This school was based on the texts Rasārṇava, Rasahṛidaya and Raseśvarasiddhānta, composed by Govinda Bhagavat and Sarvajña Rāmeśvara according to Cowell and Gough.

== Overview ==
Raseśvaras, like many other schools of Indian philosophy, believed that liberation was identity of self with Shiva and freedom from transmigration. However, unlike other schools, Raseśvaras thought that liberation could only be achieved by using mercury to acquire an imperishable body. Hence, they called mercury pārada or the means of conveyance beyond transmigratory existence. Extrication of soul to Raseśvaras was a cognizable act and therefore, for liberation it was necessary to maintain an imperishable bodily life. They used scriptural evidence from the Purusha Sukta and Puranas to support this point of view.

== Usage of mercury ==
Mercury was sacred to the Raseśvaras, so much so that they considered disparaging mercury blasphemy. Rasahṛidaya mentions mercury to be a creation by Shiva and Gauri whereas, Rasārṇava holds the worship of mercury to be more beatific than the worship of all symbols of Shiva. Raseśvaras described eighteen methods of treating mercury—sweating, rubbing, swooning, fixing, dropping, coercion, restraining, kindling, going, falling into globules, pulverising, covering, internal flux, external flux, burning, colouring, pouring, and eating it by parting and piercing it. Mercury could applied to both blood and body.

Raseśvarasiddhānta described three modes in which mercury could be used together with air—swooning, dead and bound. Swooning mercury and air were thought to carry diseases, dead they were thought to restore life and bound they were thought to give the power of levitation. Mercury was described as swooning when it was of various colours and free from excessive volatility. It was dead when it showed wetness, thickness, brightness, heaviness and mobility. And it was bound when it was continuous, fluent, luminous, pure, heavy, and if it parted under friction.

However, it is now known that exposure to mercury and its compounds causes hydrargyria or mercury poisoning.

== See also ==
- Rasayana
- Rasashastra
- Rasalingam
- Mercury poisoning
- Chinese alchemical elixir poisoning
