= Nagarjuna (metallurgist) =

Buddhist philosopher

Nāgārjuna (नागार्जुन) (c. 150-250 CE) is considered one of the most important Buddhism philosophers. In some traditions, the name "Nāgārjuna" is known as an Indian metallurgist and alchemist in 10th-century.

== History ==
There are conflicting traditions of Nagarjuna as a founder of the Mahayana sect of Buddhism, and Nagarjuna the alchemist. Chinese and Tibetan literature suggests Nāgārjuna was born in Vidarbha, and later migrated to the nearby Satavahana dynasty. One tradition is that rasasiddha Nagarjuna was born in Gujarat and was a Jain in his past life. He later travelled to various places in South India and established many laboratories. There are evidences found of his experimental laboratory in village Nagalwadi in Maharashtra state. According to some evidences he was working on immortality and knew the extraction of iron and mercury. There is much confusion about this author in the secondary literature. A 1984 study of manuscripts and printed editions connected with the alchemist Nāgārjuna found that his name is associated with a work titled Rasendramaṅgala but that the manuscripts of the Rasaratnākara are uniformly ascribed to a different author, Nityanātha Siddha.

== Works ==
Because many historical authors have written under the name Nāgārjuna, and many works on medicine and alchemy have been ascribed to this figure, scholars recommend distinguishing the alchemical Nāgārjuna from the second-century Buddhist philosopher of the same name. Manuscript works with the claimed authorship of Nāgārjuna include: Jīvasūtra, Rasavaiśeṣikasūtra, Yogaśataka, Kakṣapuṭa, Yogaratnamālā and several other works (Meulenbeld lists over fifty).

Traditional accounts hold that Nāgārjuna practiced ayurvedic alchemy (rasayāna). Kumārajīva's biography for example, describes Nāgārjuna making an elixir of invisibility, and Bus-ton, Taranatha and Xuanzang all recount that he could turn rocks into gold. The most recent comprehensive discussion of the complicated text-historical issues connected with the name Nāgārjuna is given in the History of Indian Medical Literature.

== See also ==
- Rasavātam
- History of metallurgy in the Indian subcontinent
