= Ellipsoidal dome =

Type of dome with an ellipsoidal shape

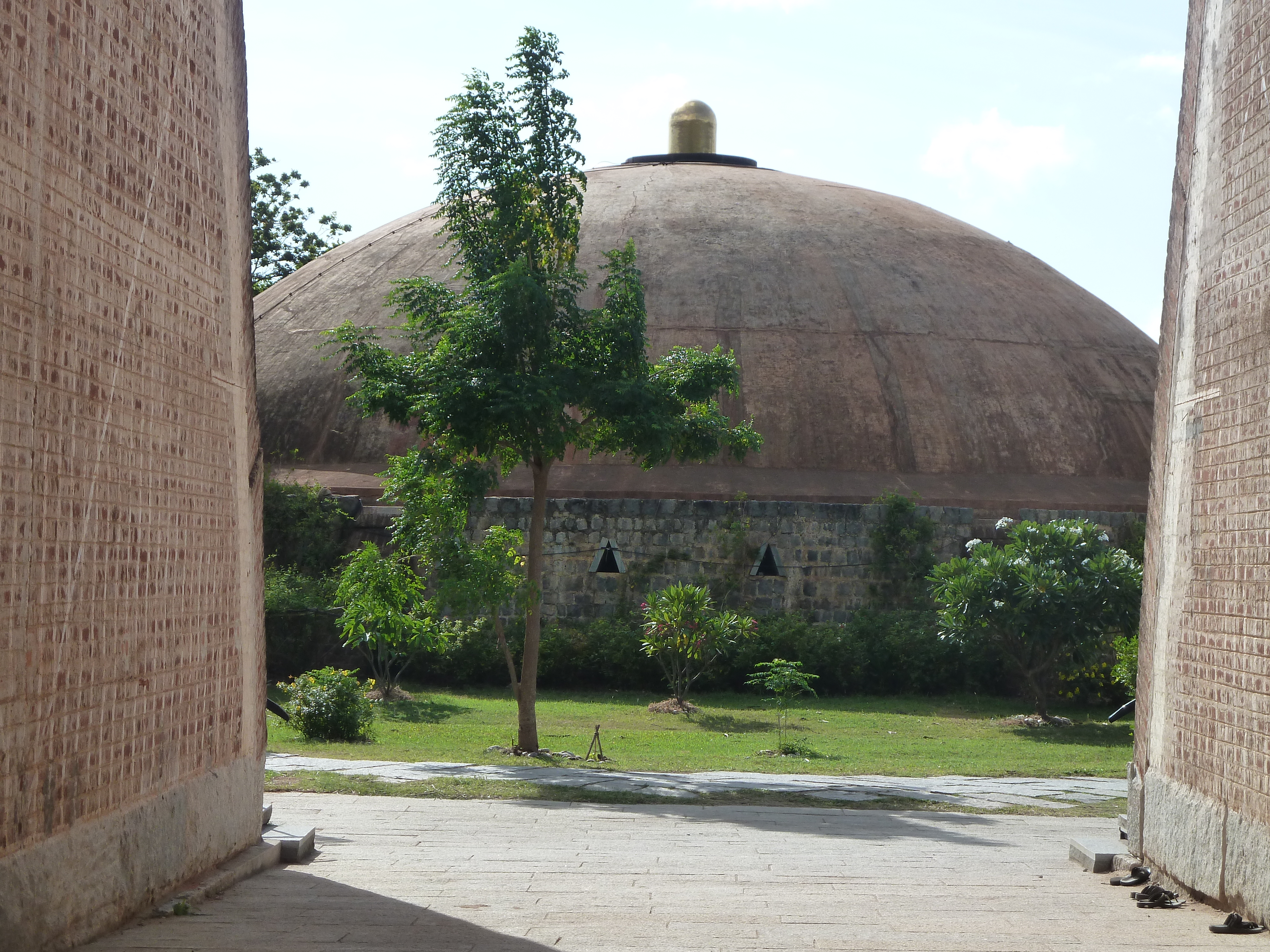
Ellipsoidal dome of Dhyanalinga

An ellipsoidal dome is a dome (also see geodesic dome), which has a bottom cross-section which is a circle, but has a cupola whose curve is an ellipse.

There are two types of ellipsoidal domes: prolate ellipsoidal domes and oblate ellipsoidal domes. A prolate ellipsoidal dome is derived by rotating an ellipse around the long axis of the ellipse; an oblate ellipsoidal dome is derived by rotating an ellipse around the short axis of the ellipse.

Of small note, in reflecting telescopes the mirror is usually elliptical, so has the form of a "hollow" ellipsoidal dome.

The Jameh Mosque of Yazd has an ellipsoidal dome.

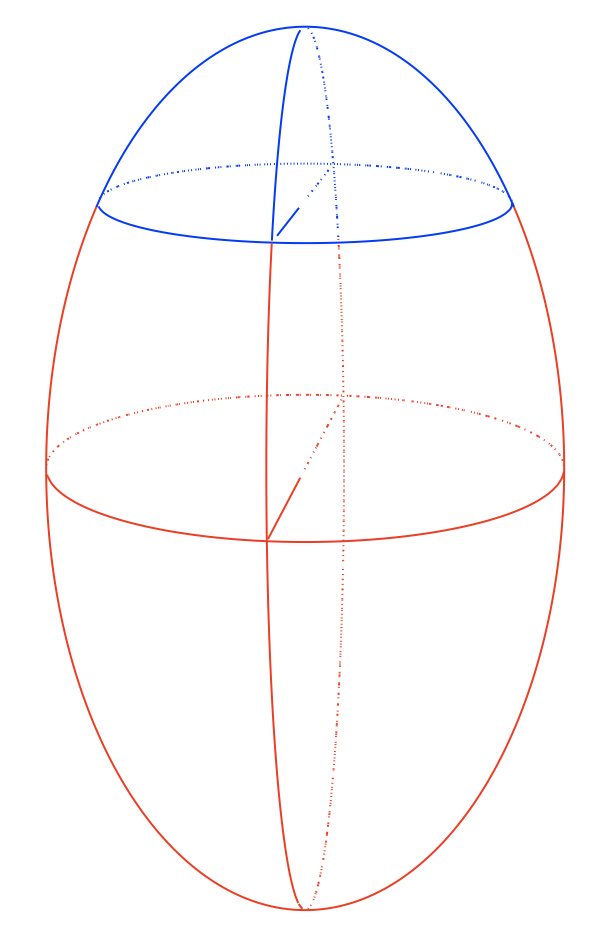
Graphical illustration of an ellipsoidal dome. Note the blue and red horizontal "ellipses" are circles, at an angle. The blue and red vertical ellipse is rotated, about its vertical axis. At top in blue is a prolate ellipsoidal dome.

== See also ==
- Beehive tomb
- Clochán
- Cloister vault
- Dome
- Ellipsoid
- Ellipsoidal coordinates
- Elliptical dome
- Geodesic dome
- Geodesics on an ellipsoid
- Great ellipse
- Onion dome
- Spherical cap
- Spheroid

== External links and references ==
- One calculation site, for oblate and prolate ellipsoidal domes
