= Rasaratna Samuchaya =

Medieval treatise on alchemy in Sanskrit

Rasaratna Samuccaya ( Devanagari: रसरत्न समुच्चय) is an Indian Sanskrit treatise on alchemy by Vāgabhatācārya. The text is dated between 13th to 16th century CE.

The text contains detailed descriptions of various complex metallurgical processes, as well as descriptions of how to set up and equip a laboratory and other topics concerning Indian alchemy. It is a work that synthesises the writings and opinions of several earlier authors and presents a coherent account of medieval Indian alchemy.

== Contents ==
Among the diverse scientific content of this text is:

- Systematic approach to the Science. (Rasaratna Samuccaya 6/2)
- Philosophy of scientific explanation.
- Two kinds of mineral with zinc: calamine and Smithsonite. (Rasaratna Samuccaya 2-149)
- Color and nature of the mineral. ('Artha-sastra' '2 -30)
- Color of minerals with copper.
- Properties of some chemicals, such as calcium carbonate. (Rasaratna Samuccaya 3 / 130-131)
- Distillation of mercury. (Rasaratna Samucchaya 3/144)
- Explanation of the corrosion (Rasārṇava 7/97)
- The color of the flame (Rasārṇava 4/51)
- Three types of iron (Rasaratna Samuccaya 5/69)
- Two kinds of tin (Rasaratna Samuccaya 5 / 153-154)
- The lead (Rasaratna Samuccaya 5/170)
- The zinc metal (Rasataraṅgiṇi 19/95)
- The brass (Rasendra Cūḍāmaṇi14 / 154)
- The bronze (Rasaratna Samuccaya 5/205)
- Conditions of a laboratory and the people who work within it.
