= Rasashastra =

Compilation of traditional ancient Indian medicine practice

In Ayurvedic medicine, rasaśāstra (रसशास्त्र) refers to processes by which various metals, minerals and other substances, including most notably mercury, are purified and combined with herbs in an attempt to treat illnesses. Rasaśāstra is a pharmaceutical branch of Indian system of medicine and a genre of literature which mainly deals with the metals, minerals, product of animal origin, toxic herbs and their use in therapeutics.

== Origin ==
The Kalyāṇakāraka, composed in South India by Ugrāditya, is the earliest medical work to contain alchemical content. It is datable to the early ninth century CE. It gives descriptions for the processing of mercury and uses technical terminology related to the procedures and implements required for alchemy. It is the first work to describe purifying (śodhana) and calcining (māraṇaʼ) mercury for medicinal use. The first work of the Sanskrit alchemical literary genre called rasaśāstra is the 10th century Rasahṛdayatantra. The texts 19 chapters focus on the processing mercury, outlines 18 means to process mercury and discusses the transmutation of metals and the body.

== Methods ==
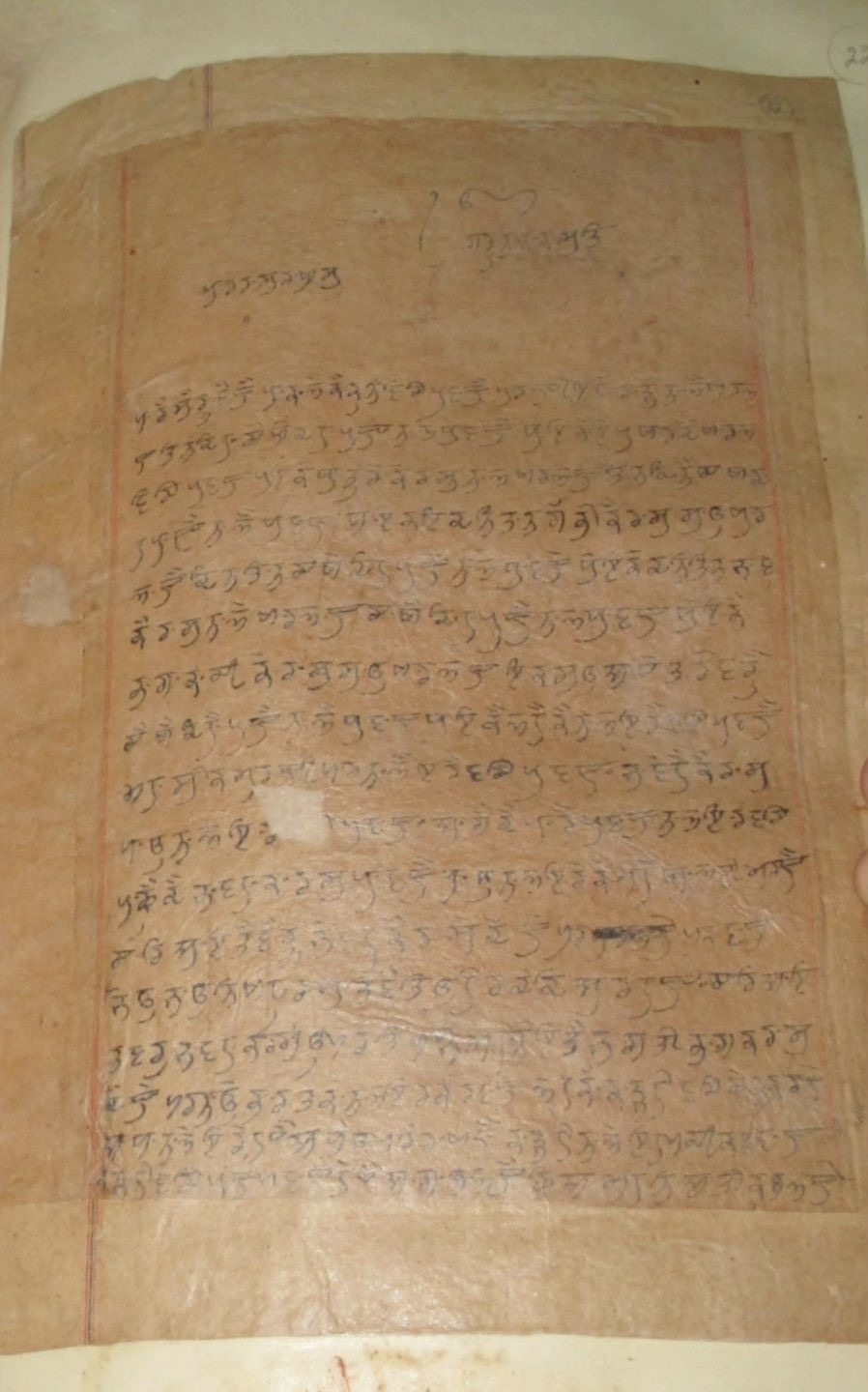
Folio of a composition documenting the recipe for a mercury potion from the Kartarpur Bir

Early medical texts, especially the Carakasaṃhitā and Suśrutasaṃhitā, are often claimed to contain early references to rasaśāstra. Where these texts use the word rasa, later commentators interpret rasa as mercury, despite the word having various other meanings. The earliest mentions of mercury are to the unprocessed substance and it is not until the 9th century Kalyāṇakāraka that we find recipes for purifying and calcination. The 13th century Śārṅgadharasaṃhitā also contains elaborate descriptions of the processing and uses of mercury.

An important feature is the use of metals, including several that are toxic. In addition to mercury, gold, silver, iron, copper, tin, lead, zinc and bell metal are used. In addition to these metals, salts and other substances such as coral, seashells, and feathers are also used.

The usual means used to administer these substances is by preparations called bhasma, Sanskrit for "ash". Calcination, which is described in the literature of the art as śodhana, "purification", is the process used to prepare these bhasma for administration. Sublimation and the preparation of a mercury sulfide are also in use in the preparation of its materia medica. A variety of methods are used to achieve this. One involves the heating of thin sheets of metal and then immersing them in oil (taila), extract (takra), cow urine (gomutra) and other substances. Others are calcined in crucibles heated with fires of cow dung (puttam). Ayurvedic practitioners believe that this process of purification removes undesirable qualities and enhances their therapeutic power.

== Toxicity ==
Modern medicine finds that mercury is inherently toxic, and that its toxicity is not due to the presence of impurities. While mercury does have anti-microbial properties, and used to be widely used in Western medicine, its toxicity does not warrant the risk of using it as a health product in most circumstances. The Centers for Disease Control and Prevention have also reported a number of cases of lead poisoning associated with Ayurvedic medicine. Other incidents of heavy metal poisoning have been attributed to the use of rasashastra compounds in the United States, and arsenic has also been found in some of the preparations, which have been marketed in the United States under trade names such as "AyurRelief", "GlucoRite", "Acnenil", "Energize", "Cold Aid", and "Lean Plus".

Ayurvedic practitioners claim that these reports of toxicity are due to failure to follow traditional practices in the mass production of these preparations for sale, however there is ample evidence of mercury and lead toxicity. The government of India has ordered that Ayurvedic products must specify their metallic content directly on the labels of the product; however, M. S. Valiathan noted that "the absence of post-market surveillance and the paucity of test laboratory facilities [in India] make the quality control of Ayurvedic medicines exceedingly difficult at this time."

== See also ==
- History of metallurgy in the Indian subcontinent
- Mercury poisoning
- Rasayana
- Siddha medicine

== See also ==
- History of metallurgy in the Indian subcontinent
- Rasayana
- Raseśvara
- Siddha medicine
