= Rasayana =

Ayurvedic medicine practice

In early ayurvedic medicine, rasāyana is one of the eight areas of medicine in Sanskrit literature.

The 11th-century Persian scholar Abū Rayhān Bīrūnī noted an Indian science named Rasāyana, focused on restoring health and rejuvenation through plant-derived medicines. Nagarjunacharya conducted experiments in his laboratory called "Rasashala" and authored Rasaratanakaram, detailing alchemical transformations of metals. Al-Bīrūnī conflated the earlier rasāyana practices with rasashastra alchemy.

Rasashastra utilized alchemical processes involving substances like mercury and cinnabar. This practice extended beyond metals, incorporating the preparation of medical tinctures from plants. Rasashastra's goals included longevity, health, cognitive enhancement, virility, and extraordinary abilities. Its historical influence was evident in the Ajanta and Ellora cave paintings, the Vishnustambha monument, and the Kondivade caves' processed wood sample.

== History ==
The more general name for the Indian science of alchemy or proto-chemistry is rasashastra (रसशास्त्र in Sanskrit), or "The Science of Mercury," in Nepali, Marathi, Hindi, Kannada and several other languages.

Early Indian alchemical texts discuss the use of prepared forms of mercury or cinnabar (see samskaras). However, there is also ample mention of the preparation of medical tinctures in the early science of Indian alchemy.

Significant progress in alchemy was made in medieval India. An 11th-century Persian chemist and physician named Abū Rayhān Bīrūnī reported

[the Indians] have a science similar to alchemy which is quite peculiar to them. They call it Rasâyana, a word composed with rasa, i.e., gold. It means an art which is restricted to certain operations, drugs, and compound medicines, most of which are taken from plants. Its principles restore the health of those who were ill beyond hope, and give back youth to fading old age...

Two known examples were Nagarjunacharya and Nityanadhiya. Nagarjunacharya, was one of the prominent chemists in the history of Indian alchemy. He ran many experiments in his laboratory known as the "Rasashala". His book, Rasaratanakaram is a known example of ancient Indian medicine, in which he describes the procedure of transmuting base metals like mercury, into gold. Due to his contributions and insight in chemistry, he was appointed as chancellor in the university of Nalanda. From the 14th century onwards, many materials from rasāyana and rasashastra were translated and integrated in the Persian texts written by Muslim scholars in South Asia.

== Aim and types ==
The historical aims of rasāyana were diverse, but the effects attributed to a treatment were typically either longevity, health, intellect, sexuality or magical abilities.

In essence, rasāyana sought to promote aspects of vitality. In pursuit of these matters, herbal prescriptions with many herbal substances, preserved in ghee and honey are given. Specific adaptogenic herbs are also included in rasayanas including haritaki, amla, shilajit, ashwaganda, holy basil, guduchi and shatavari.

== See also ==
- A History of Hindu Chemistry, a two-volume book by Prafulla Chandra Ray published in 1902 and 1909
- History of metallurgy in the Indian subcontinent
- Rasashastra
- Raseśvara
- Siddha medicine
