= Deng Yu =

Deng Yu may refer to:

- Deng Yu (Han dynasty) (2–58), general and official of the Han dynasty
- Deng Yu (Ming dynasty) (1337–1377), general and official of the Ming dynasty
- Yu Deng (born 1989), Chinese mathematician
