= Rasalingam =

Symbol of the Hindu god Shiva made from mercury

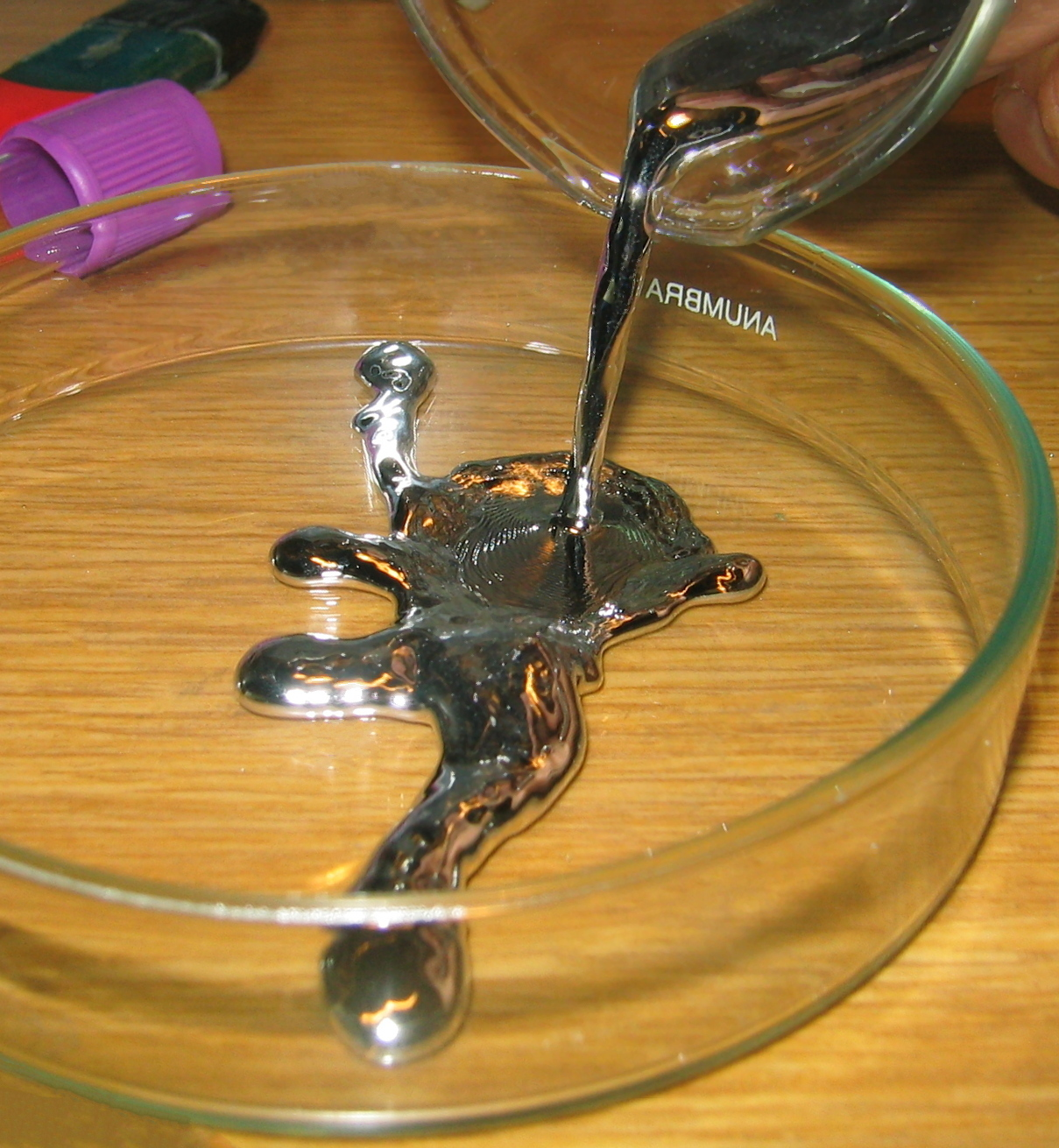
Mercury

In Hinduism, Rasalingam or Parad Lingam is a Lingam, the symbol of the god Shiva, made of mercury (or possibly Gallium; see Composition below.) Tamil Siddhas carved Shiva Lingam from solidified mercury. The process of solidification of mercury is the secret process enunciated by Tamil Siddhas. In Tamil, mercury is called Pada-rasam and the Shiva Lingam made using pada-rasam is called Rasalingam. In Sanskrit, mercury is called Parad and the Shiva Lingam made using parad is called Parad Lingam. Rasalingams or Parad Lingams are consecrated in Hindu Shiva temples, Ashrams and other places of worships.

== Siddhic beliefs ==
Shiva Puja must be performed with linga. The Rasalingam has a place in the worship of Shiva. Tamil Siddhas identify mercury as Shiva's metal (Shivadhatu). According to Siddha alchemy, mercury is the representation of male (Shiva) form, and the chemical element sulfur associated in the solidification process is considered as the representation of female (Shakti or Gauri, consort of Shiva) form.

== Notable rasalinga ==
=== Masilamaniswara Temple, Thirumullaivoyal ===
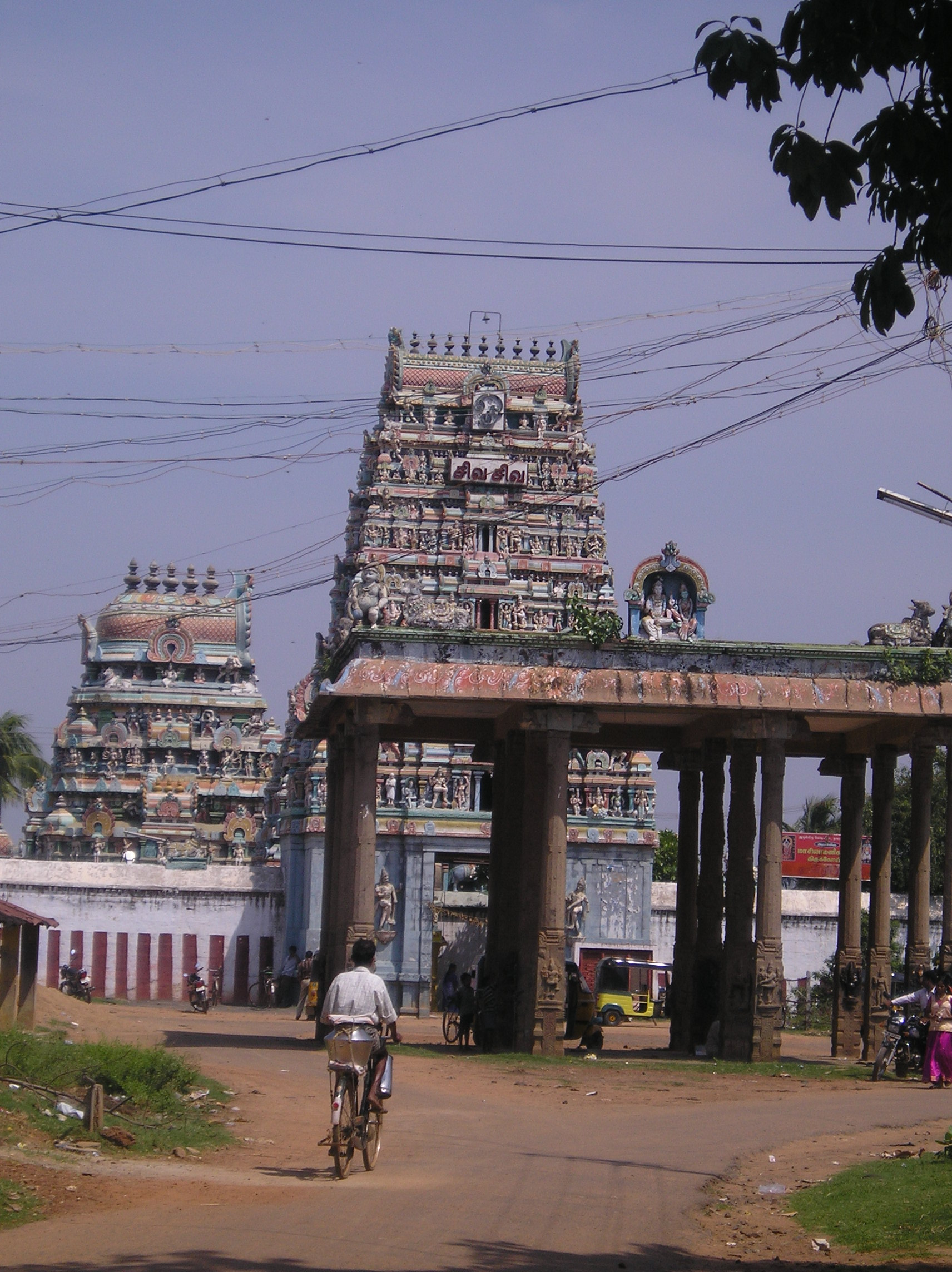
Kodiyidai Amman Sametha Masilamaniswara Temple, Thirumullaivoyal

Kodiyidai Amman Sametha Masilamaniswara Temple is situated at Thirumullaivoyal, a small town forming part of west Chennai and the temple is 2 km away from Ambattur. The prime deity Shiva at this temple was incarnated by the hymns of Sundarar, Ramalinga Adigalar and Arunagirinathar. A Rasalingam is installed in the second corridor near sanctum sanctorum of Shiva. The huge Shiva Linga in the sanctum sanctorum is covered with sandal paste. Every year in the month of Chittirai (Mar-Apr), on Sadaya nakshatra (Sadayam star), the Santhana kappu (sandal paste cover) is refurbished with Veru kappu.

=== Shiva Temple, Visakhapatnam ===
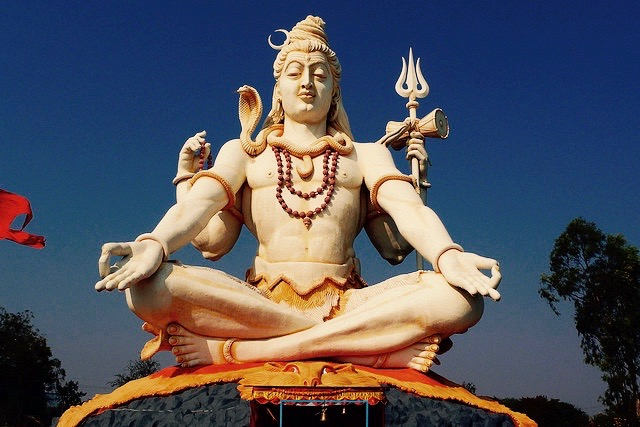
Shiva

Shiva temple is located in Visakhapatnam (also known as Vizag and Waltair), the first largest city in Andhra Pradesh. The temple is situated on Rama Krishna Beach road. The uniqueness of this Siva Temple is its Rasalingam, which is made of a 10 kg single stone.

=== Siddha Ashram, Ujjain ===
Siddha Ashram is located near to Harsiddhi Temple in Ujjain, Madhya Pradesh, India. The area contains a temple, meditation chamber and gardens, and attracts hundreds visitors each year. The World's Largest Paredeshvar temple at the ashram is unique. It houses a mercury (parad) shivalinga which weighs 2500 kilograms, the largest of its kind in the world. The ashram is run by Acharya Mahamandaleshwara Swami Nardanandji who is known for his Kundalini Shaktipath initiation and research into ayurvedic based medicinal remedies. Siddha Ashram has consecrated the world's largest Parad Lingam weighing about 2500 kg. during November, 2005. The Parad Lingam temple is located at Ashram complex. People are allowed to see, touch and worship this Lingam.

=== Dhyanalinga and Theerthakund, Coimbatore ===
The Dhyanalinga is a Yogic temple located 30 km (19 mi) from Coimbatore, India. Dhyanalinga temple was consecrated using prana prathista by Sadhguru Jaggi Vasudev, a yogi and mystic. The Dhyanalinga Yogic Temple offers a meditative space. At this temple complex there is Theerthakund, a subterranean tank located 35 ft (10.7 m) below holds a lingam immersed in water. Followers claim that the lingam is made of solidified and 99.8% purified mercury. People can take a dip in this water before they go to the Dhyanalinga temple. A semi-circular brick vault covers this tank, the inner sides of which have murals depicting a Kumbha Mela scene.

=== Sri Dattashram, Anksapoor Village, Velpoor mandal, Nizamabad dist, Telangana ===
At Dattashram Anksapoor village near Nizamabad in Telangana a Rasalingam, one of the huge rasalingam weighing about 411 kg. was consecrated on April 25, 2004, by the Jagadguru Pushpagiri Shankaracharya and Hampi Virupaksha Vidyaranya Peethadhipati. The Rs.6 lakh worth Rasalingam was brought from Banaras, Uttar Pradesh. It is a world largest rasalingam. The temple was established by pujya sri vittal goud (bapu) maharaj.

=== Paradeswar Temple in Dharamgarh ===
Paradeswar Siva Temple located in Dharamgarh, Kalahandi has a Rasalingam.

== Composition ==
Rasalingam is likely an amalgam alloyed with copper or gallium, a liquid metal with properties similar to, but not as toxic as, mercury. The density of rasalingam is approximately 6g/cc, far below the density of mercury, at above 14g/cc. This matches the density of gallium, which melts at 29.6 degrees Celsius, just above the typically cooler temperatures in India. It is also notable that India imports, rather than exports, mercury, and is not a major producer of it. India is, however, the fifth most prolific exporter of bauxite, from which gallium is extracted. It also may be a copper amalgam. When fine powdered copper amalgamates with mercury, a soft clay like material forms. It can be molded and formed into a lingam.
