= History of metallurgy in the Indian subcontinent =

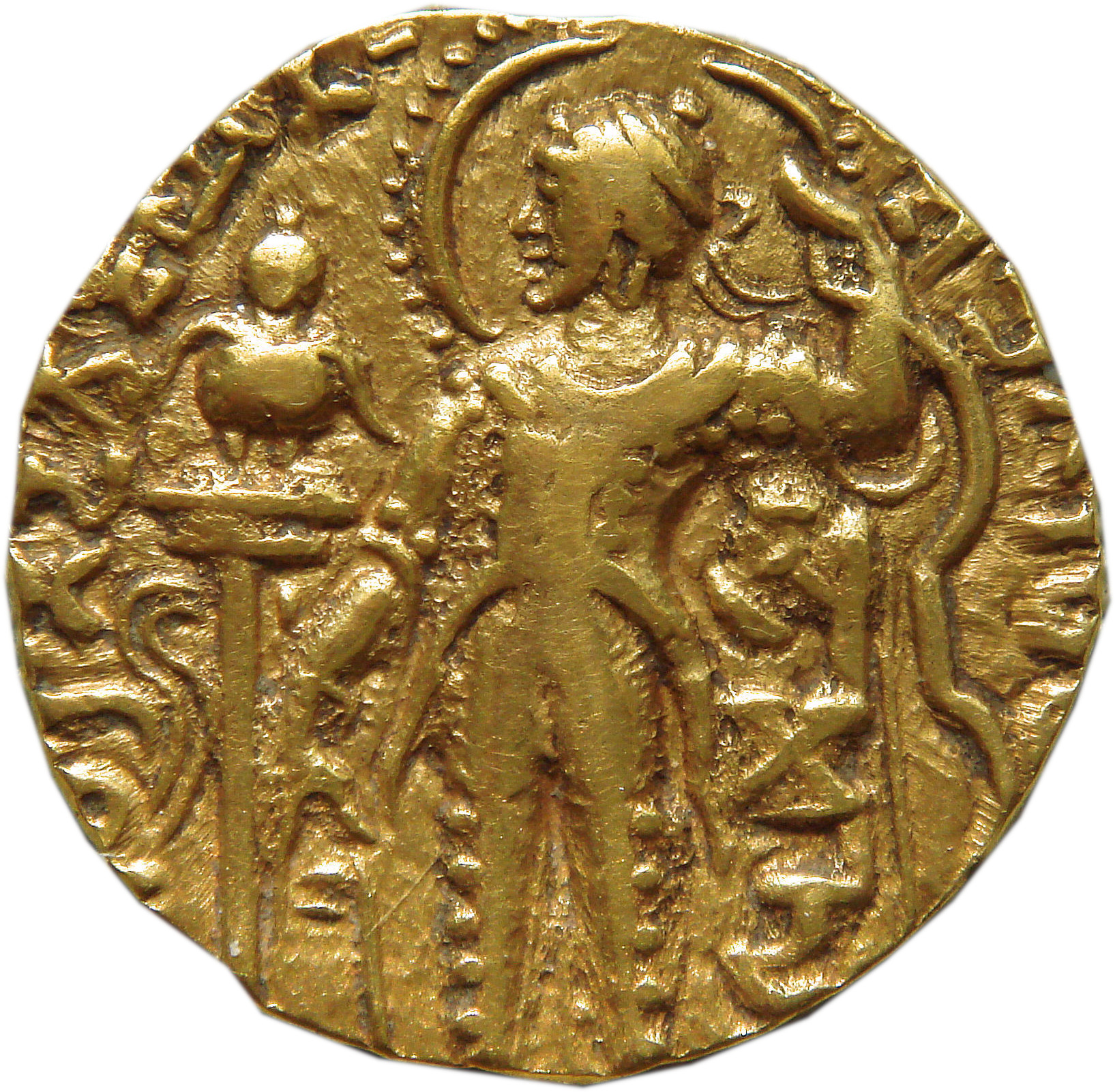
Coin of Samudragupta (c. 350—375) with Garuda pillar. British Museum.

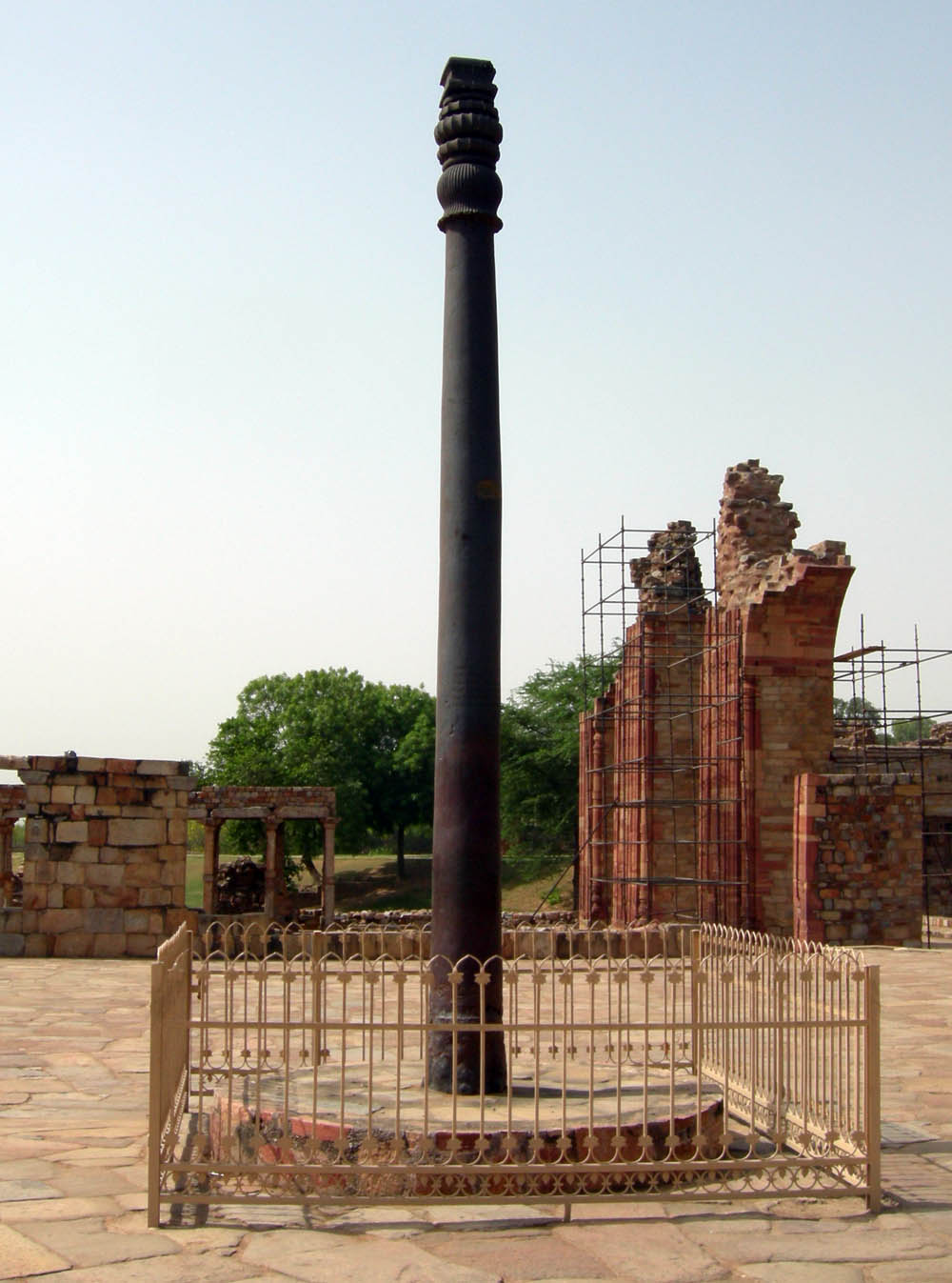
The iron pillar of Delhi (375—413).

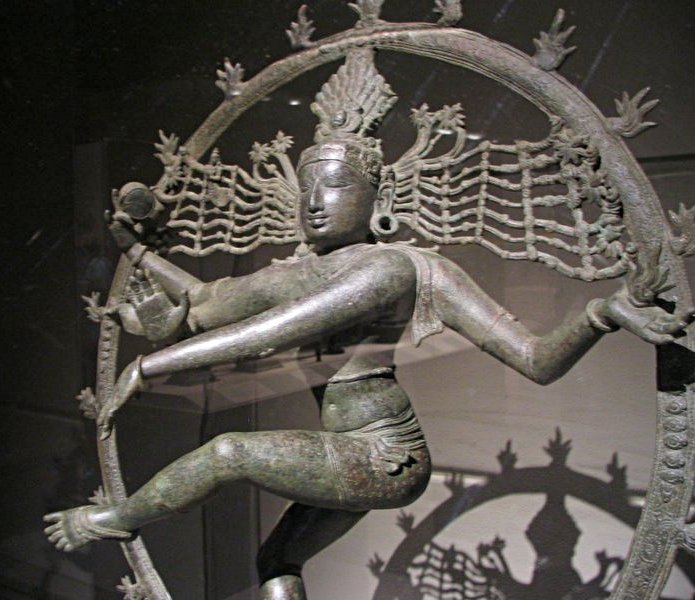
Bronze Chola Statue of Nataraja at the Metropolitan Museum of Art, New York City.

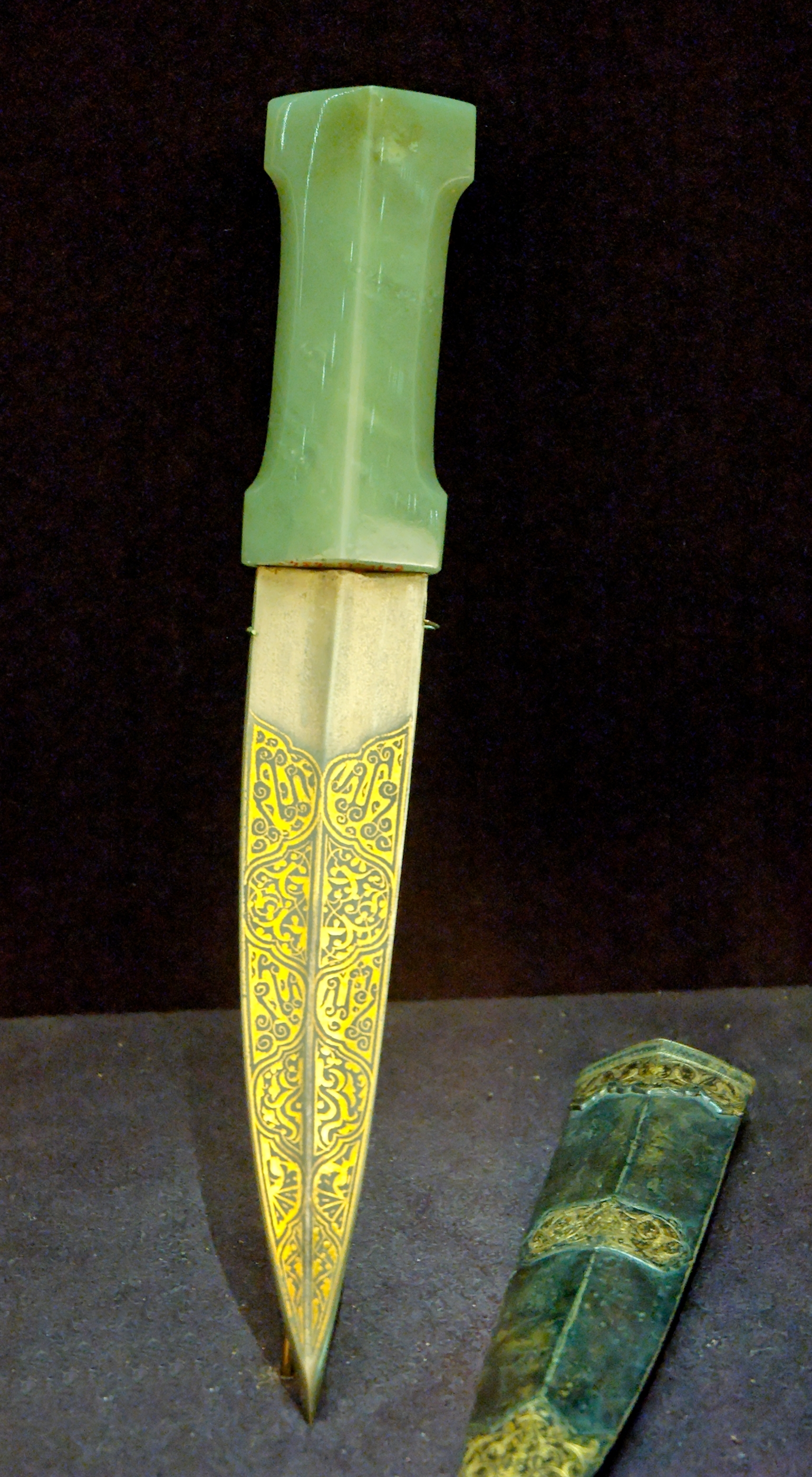
Dagger and its scabbard, India, 17th—18th century. Blade: Damascus steel inlaid with gold; hilt: jade; scabbard: steel with engraved, chased and gilded decoration.

The history of metallurgy in the Indian subcontinent began prior to the 3rd millennium BCE. Metals and related concepts were mentioned in various early Vedic age texts. The Rigveda already uses the Sanskrit term ayas (Sanskrit: अयस्, romanized: áyas, lit. 'metal; copper; iron'). The Indian cultural and commercial contacts with the Near East and the Greco-Roman world enabled an exchange of metallurgic sciences. The advent of the Mughals (established: April 21, 1526—ended: September 21, 1857) further improved the established tradition of metallurgy and metal working in India. During the period of British rule in India (first by the East India Company and then by the Crown), the metalworking industry in India stagnated due to various colonial policies, though efforts by industrialists led to the industry's revival during the 19th century.

== Overview ==
Excavations in Middle Ganga Valley done by archaeologist Rakesh Tewari show iron working in India may have begun as early as 1800 BCE. Archaeological sites in India, such as Malhar, Dadupur, Raja Nala Ka Tila and Lahuradewa in the state of Uttar Pradesh show iron implements in the period 1800–1200 BCE. Sahi (1979: 366) concluded that by the early 13th century BCE, iron smelting was definitely practiced on a bigger scale in India, suggesting that the date the technology's inception may well be placed as early as the 16th century BCE. However, reviewing the claims of early uses of iron during c. 1800-1000 BCE, archaeologist Suraj Bhan noted, "the stratigraphical context and chronology of iron is not beyond doubt" at these sites (namely Malhar, Dadupur, and Lahuradeva) — although "there is no doubt" that iron was being used in the Ganges Plains "a few centuries before the rise of urbanization [...] around 600 BCE".

The Black and Red Ware culture was another early Iron Age archaeological culture of the northern Indian subcontinent. It is dated to roughly the 12th – 6th centuries BCE, and associated with the post-Rigvedic Vedic civilization. It extended from the upper Gangetic plain in Uttar Pradesh to the eastern Vindhya range and West Bengal.

Perhaps as early as 500 BCE, although certainly by 200 CE, high quality steel was being produced in southern India by what Europeans would later call the crucible technique. In this system, high-purity wrought iron, charcoal, and glass were mixed in crucibles and heated until the iron melted and absorbed the carbon. The resulting high-carbon steel, called fūlāḏ by the Arabs (Arabic: فولاذ, romanized: fūlāḏ, lit. 'steel; wootz') and wootz by later Europeans, was exported throughout much of Asia and Europe.

Will Durant wrote in The Story of Civilization I: Our Oriental Heritage:

"Something has been said about the chemical excellence of cast iron in ancient India, and about the high industrial development of the Gupta times, when India was looked to, even by Imperial Rome, as the most skilled of the nations in such chemical industries as dyeing, tanning, soap-making, glass and cement... By the sixth century the Hindus were far ahead of Europe in industrial chemistry; they were masters of calcinations, distillation, sublimation, steaming, fixation, the production of light without heat, the mixing of anesthetic and soporific powders, and the preparation of metallic salts, compounds and alloys. The tempering of steel was brought in ancient India to a perfection unknown in Europe till our own times; King Porus is said to have selected, as a specially valuable gift for Alexander, not gold or silver, but thirty pounds of steel. The Moslems took much of this Hindu chemical science and industry to the Near East and Europe; the secret of manufacturing "Damascus" blades, for example, was taken by the Arabs from the Persians, and by the Persians from India."

== Hindu, Buddhist, Jain and other texts ==
The Sanskrit term ayas means metal and can refer to bronze, copper or iron.

=== Rigveda ===
The Rigveda refers to ayas, and also states that the Dasyus had ayas (RV 2.20.8). In RV 4.2.17, "the gods [are] smelting like copper/metal ore the human generations".

The references to ayas in the Rig Veda probably refer to bronze or copper rather than to iron. Scholars like Bhargava maintain that Rigveda was written in the Vedic state of Brahmavarta and Khetri Copper mines formed an important location in Brahmavarta. Vedic people had used Copper extensively in agriculture, Water purification, tools, utensils etc., D. K. Chakrabarti (1992) argued: "It should be clear that any controversy regarding the meaning of ayas in the Rgveda or the problem of the Rgvedic familiarity or unfamiliarity with iron is pointless. There is no positive evidence either way. It can mean both copper-bronze and iron and, strictly on the basis of the contexts, there is no reason to choose between the two."

=== Arthashastra ===
The Arthashastra lays down the role of the Director of Metals, the Director of Forest Produce and the Director of Mining. It is the duty of the Director of Metals to establish factories for different metals. The Director of Mines is responsible for the inspection of mines. The Arthashastra also refers to counterfeit coins.

=== Other texts ===
There are many references to ayas in the early Indian texts.

The Atharvaveda and the Shatapatha Brahmana refer to kṛṣṇa-ayas (Sanskrit: कृष्णायस्, romanized: kṛṣṇāyas / kṛṣṇa-ayas, lit. 'black metal'), which could be iron (but possibly also iron ore and iron items not made of smelted iron). There is also some controversy if the term śyāma-ayas (Sanskrit: श्यामायस्, romanized: śyāmāyas / śyāma-ayas, lit. 'black metal'), refers to iron or not. In later texts the term refers to iron. In earlier texts, it could possibly also refer to darker-than-copper bronze, an alloy of copper and tin. Copper can also become black when heated. Oxidation with the use of sulphides can produce the same effect.

The Yajurveda seems to know iron. In the Taittiriya Samhita are references to ayas and at least one reference to smiths. The Satapatha Brahmana 6.1.3.5 refers to the smelting of metallic ore. In the Manu Smriti (6.71), the following analogy is found: "For as the impurities of metallic ores, melted in the blast (of a furnace), are consumed, even so the taints of the organs are destroyed through the suppression of the breath." Metal was also used in agriculture, and the Buddhist text Suttanipata has the following analogy: "for as a ploughshare that has got hot during the day when thrown into the water splashes, hisses and smokes in volumes..."

In the Charaka Samhita an analogy occurs that probably refers to the lost wax technique. The Silpasastras (the Manasara, the Manasollasa (Abhilashitartha Chintamani) and the Uttarabhaga of Silparatna) describe the lost wax technique in detail.

The Silappadikaram says that copper-smiths were in Puhar and in Madura. According to the History of the Han Dynasty by Ban Gu, Kashmir and "Tien-chu" were rich in metals.

The post-1400 CE treatise Rasaratnakara that deals with preparations of rasa (mercury) compounds. It gives a survey of the status of metallurgy and alchemy in the land. Extraction of metals such as silver, gold, tin and copper from their ores and their purification were also mentioned in the treatise. The Rasa Ratnasamuccaya describes the extraction and use of copper.

== Archaeology ==
Chakrabarti (1976) has identified six early iron-using centres in India: Baluchistan, the Northwest, the Indo-Gangetic divide and the upper Gangetic valley, eastern India, Malwa and Berar in central India and the megalithic south India. The central Indian region seems to be the earliest iron-using centre.

According to Tewari, iron using and iron "was prevalent in the Central Ganga Plain and the Eastern Vindhyas from the early 2nd millennium BC."

The evidence for smelted iron in Central India dates to 1300 to 1000 BCE. These early findings also occur in places like the Deccan and the earliest evidence for smelted iron occurs in Central India, not in north-western India. Moreover, the dates for iron in India are not later than in those of Central Asia, and according to some scholars (e.g. Koshelenko 1986) the dates for smelted iron may actually be earlier in India than in Central Asia and Iran. The Iron Age did however not necessary imply a major social transformation, and Gregory Possehl wrote that "the Iron Age is more of a continuation of the past then a break with it".

Recently reported claims of much earlier datings for iron smelting in Tamil Nadu's Sivagalai site are not yet published in peer-reviewed scientific journals and have been questioned by some scholars. (Note: The radiometric datings spanning a range from 3345 BCE to 1155 BCE "raise many questions [...] as no culture would remain static, materially for two thousand years," and it was the earliest charcoal datings which selectively were announced as being the date of iron usage in disregard of the basic principles of archaeological stratigraphy. The presence of materials of completely different ages found nearby and mixed together can be an indication of disturbances in the stratigraphy. The reporting has also been criticised for "political theatrics." The earliest reliably dated iron furnace in Tamil Nadu was from the 5th century BCE at Kodumanal, Tamil Nadu.) Previously known early iron age sites in South India are Hallur, Karnataka and Adichanallur, Tamil Nadu at around 1000 BCE.

Archaeological data suggests that India was "an independent and early centre of iron technology." According to Shaffer, the "nature and context of the iron objects involved [of the BRW culture] are very different from early iron objects found in Southwest Asia." In Central Asia, the development of iron technology was not necessarily connected with Indo-Iranian migrations either.

J.M. Kenoyer (1995) also remarks that there is a "long break in tin acquisition" necessary for the production of "tin bronzes" in the Indus Valley region, suggesting a lack of contact with Baluchistan and northern Afghanistan, or the lack of migrants from the north-west who could have procured tin.

=== Indus Valley Civilization ===
The copper-bronze metallurgy in the Harappan civilization was widespread and had a high variety and quality. The early use of iron may have developed from the practice of copper-smelting. While there is to date no proven evidence for smelted iron in the Indus Valley civilization, iron ore and iron items have been unearthed in eight Indus Valley sites, some of them dating to before 2600 BCE. There remains the possibility that some of these items were made of smelted iron, and the term "kṛṣṇa-ayas" might possibly also refer to these iron items, even if they are not made of smelted iron.

Lothali copper is unusually pure, lacking the arsenic typically used by coppersmiths across the rest of the Indus valley. Workers mixed tin with copper for the manufacture of celts, arrowheads, fishhooks, chisels, bangles, rings, drills and spearheads, although weapon manufacturing was minor. They also employed advanced metallurgy in following the cire perdue technique of casting, and used more than one-piece moulds for casting birds and animals. They also invented new tools such as curved saws and twisted drills unknown to other civilizations at the time.

== Metals ==
=== Copper ===
Copper technology may date back to the 4th millennium BCE in the Himalaya region. It is the first element to be discovered in metallurgy, Copper and its alloys were also used to create copper-bronze images such as Buddhas or Hindu/Mahayana Buddhist deities. Xuanzang also noted that there were copper-bronze Buddha images in Magadha. In Varanasi, each stage of the image manufacturing process is handled by a specialist.

Other metal objects made by Indian artisans include lamps. Copper was also a component in the razors for the tonsure ceremony.

One of the most important sources of history in the Indian subcontinent are the royal records of grants engraved on copper-plate grants (tamra-shasan or tamra-patra). Because copper does not rust or decay, they can survive indefinitely. Collections of archaeological texts from the copper-plates and rock-inscriptions have been compiled and published by the Archaeological Survey of India during the past century. The earliest known copper-plate known as the Sohgaura copper-plate is a Maurya record that mentions famine relief efforts. It is one of the very few pre-Ashoka Brahmi inscriptions in India.

=== Brass ===
Brass was used in Lothal and Atranjikhera in the 3rd and 2nd millennium BCE. Brass and probably zinc was also found at Takshashila in 4th to 3rd century BCE contexts.

=== Gold and silver ===
The deepest gold mines of the Ancient world were found in the Maski region in Karnataka. There were ancient silver mines in northwest India. Dated to the middle of the 1st millennium BCE. gold and silver were also used for making utensils for the royal family and nobilities the royal family wore costly fabrics that were made from gold and silver thin fibres embroidered or woven into fabrics or dress.

=== Iron ===
Recent excavations in Middle Ganges Valley show iron working in India may have begun as early as 1800 BCE. In the 5th century BCE, the Greek historian Herodotus observed that "Indian and the Persian army used arrows tipped with iron." Ancient Romans used armour and cutlery made of Indian iron. Pliny the Elder also mentioned Indian iron. Muhammad al-Idrisi wrote the Hindus excelled in the manufacture of iron, and that it would be impossible to find anything to surpass the edge from Hindwani steel. Quintus Curtius wrote about an Indian present of steel to Alexander. Ferrum indicum appeared in the list of articles subject to duty under Marcus Aurelius and Commodus. Indian Wootz steel was held in high regard in Europe, and Indian iron was often considered to be the best.

==== Wootz and steel ====
The first form of crucible steel was wootz, developed in India some time around 300 BCE. In its production the iron was mixed with glass and then slowly heated and then cooled. As the mixture cooled the glass would bond to impurities in the steel and then float to the surface, leaving the steel considerably purer. Carbon could enter the iron by diffusing in through the porous walls of the crucibles. Carbon dioxide would not react with the iron, but the small amounts of carbon monoxide could, adding carbon to the mix with some level of control. Wootz was widely exported throughout the Middle East, where it was combined with a local production technique around 1000 CE to produce Damascus steel, famed throughout the world. Wootz derives from the Tamil term for steel urukku. Indian wootz steel was the first high quality steel that was produced.

Henry Yule quoted the 12th-century Arab Edrizi who wrote: "The South Indians excel in the manufacture of iron, and in the preparations of those ingredients along with which it is fused to obtain that kind of soft iron which is usually styled Indian steel. They also have workshops wherein are forged the most famous sabres in the world. ...It is not possible to find anything to surpass the edge that you get from Indian steel (al-hadid al-Hindi).

As early as the 17th century, Europeans knew of India's ability to make crucible steel from reports brought back by travelers who had observed the process at several places in southern India. Several attempts were made to import the process, but failed because the exact technique remained a mystery. Studies of wootz were made in an attempt to understand its secrets, including a major effort by the famous scientist, Michael Faraday, son of a blacksmith. Working with a local cutlery manufacturer he wrongly concluded that it was the addition of aluminium oxide and silica from the glass that gave wootz its unique properties.

After the Indian Rebellion of 1857, many Indian wootz steel swords were ordered to be destroyed by the East India Company. The metalworking industry in India went into decline during the period of British Crown control due to various colonial policies, but steel production was revived in India by Jamsetji Tata.

=== Zinc ===
Zinc was extracted in North West India as early as in the 4th to 3rd century BCE.

South Asia was among the first regions to produce zinc on an industrial scale.

There are references of medicinal uses of zinc in the Charaka Samhita (300 BCE).

In the 1st century CE, Arthashastra describes the production of zinc.

In the 3rd century CE, Rasaratnakara, by Nagarjuna, describes the production of brass and zinc.

The Rasaratna Samuchaya (800 CE) explains the existence of two types of ores for zinc metal, one of which is ideal for metal extraction while the other is used for medicinal purpose. It also describes two methods of zinc distillation.

Between the 10th-13th century CE, a distillation technique was developed in the Zawar mines, of Rajasthan. The method used charchol heated clay retorts to vaporise zinc oxide, with the vapors condensed into zinc in an attached vat of water.

In 1597, Libavius, a metallurgist in England received some quantity of zinc metal and named it as Indian/Malabar lead.

In the 17th century, China exported zinc to Europe under the name of totamu or tutenag. The term tutenag may derive from the South Indian term Tutthanagaa (zinc).

In 1738, William Champion applied for, and was granted a July 1738, English patent, No. 564 ‘A Method of Invention for the Reducing of Sulphurous British Mineralls into a Body of Metallick Sulphur’, for the coal-furnace powered distillation process he used to vaporise zinc oxide, from calcined calamine ore, placed in refractory clay retorts, with vapours exhausted through iron pipes into a vat of water, where they would solidify into metallic form. His method was a scaled-up and coal fired development on the method used at the Zawar mines.

== Early history (—200 BCE) ==
Recent excavations in Middle Ganges Valley conducted by archaeologist Rakesh Tewari show iron working in India may have begun as early as 1800 BCE. Archaeological sites in India, such as Malhar, Dadupur, Raja Nala Ka Tila and Lahuradewa in the state of Uttar Pradesh show iron implements in the period between 1800 BCE-1200 BCE. Sahi (1979: 366) concluded that by the early 13th century BCE, iron smelting was definitely practiced on a bigger scale in India, suggesting that the date the technology's early period may well be placed as early as the 16th century BCE.

Some of the early iron objects found in India are dated to 1400 BCE by employing the method of radio carbon dating. Spikes, knives, daggers, arrow-heads, bowls, spoons, saucepans, axes, chisels, tongs, door fittings etc. ranging from 600 BCE—200 BCE have been discovered from several archaeological sites. In Southern India (present day Mysore) iron appeared as early as the 12th or 11th century BCE. These developments were too early for any significant close contact with the northwest of the country.

The earliest available Bronze age swords of copper discovered from the Harappan sites in Pakistan date back to 2300 BCE. Swords have been recovered in archaeological findings throughout the Ganges-Jamuna Doab region of India, consisting of bronze but more commonly copper. Diverse specimens have been discovered in Fatehgarh, where there are several varieties of hilt. These swords have been variously dated to periods between 1700 and 1400 BCE, but were probably used more extensively during the opening centuries of the 1st millennium BCE.

The beginning of the 1st millennium BCE saw extensive developments in iron metallurgy in India. Technological advancement and mastery of iron metallurgy was achieved during this period of peaceful settlements. The years between 322 and 185 BCE saw several advancements being made to the technology involved in metallurgy during the politically stable Maurya period (322—185 BCE). Greek historian Herodotus (431—425 BCE) wrote the first western account of the use of iron in India.

Perhaps as early as 300 BCE—although certainly by 200 CE—high quality steel was being produced in southern India by what Europeans would later call the crucible technique. In this system, high-purity wrought iron, charcoal, and glass were mixed in a crucible and heated until the iron melted and absorbed the carbon. The first crucible steel was the wootz steel that originated in India before the beginning of the common era. Wootz steel was widely exported and traded throughout ancient Europe, China, the Arab world, and became particularly famous in the Middle East, where it became known as Damascus steel. Archaeological evidence suggests that this manufacturing process was already in existence in South India well before the common era.

The Periplus Maris Erythraei mentions weapons of Indian iron and steel being exported from India to Greece.

Zinc mines of Zawar, near Udaipur, Rajasthan, were active during 400 BCE. There are references of medicinal uses of zinc in the Charaka Samhita (300 BCE).

== Early Common Era—Early Modern Era ==
18th-century Mughal astrolabe, Adler Planetarium

Seamless celestial globe by Muhammad Saleh Thattvi with Arabic and Sanskrit inscriptions, dated AH 1074 (1663–4 CE), Khalili Collection of Islamic Art

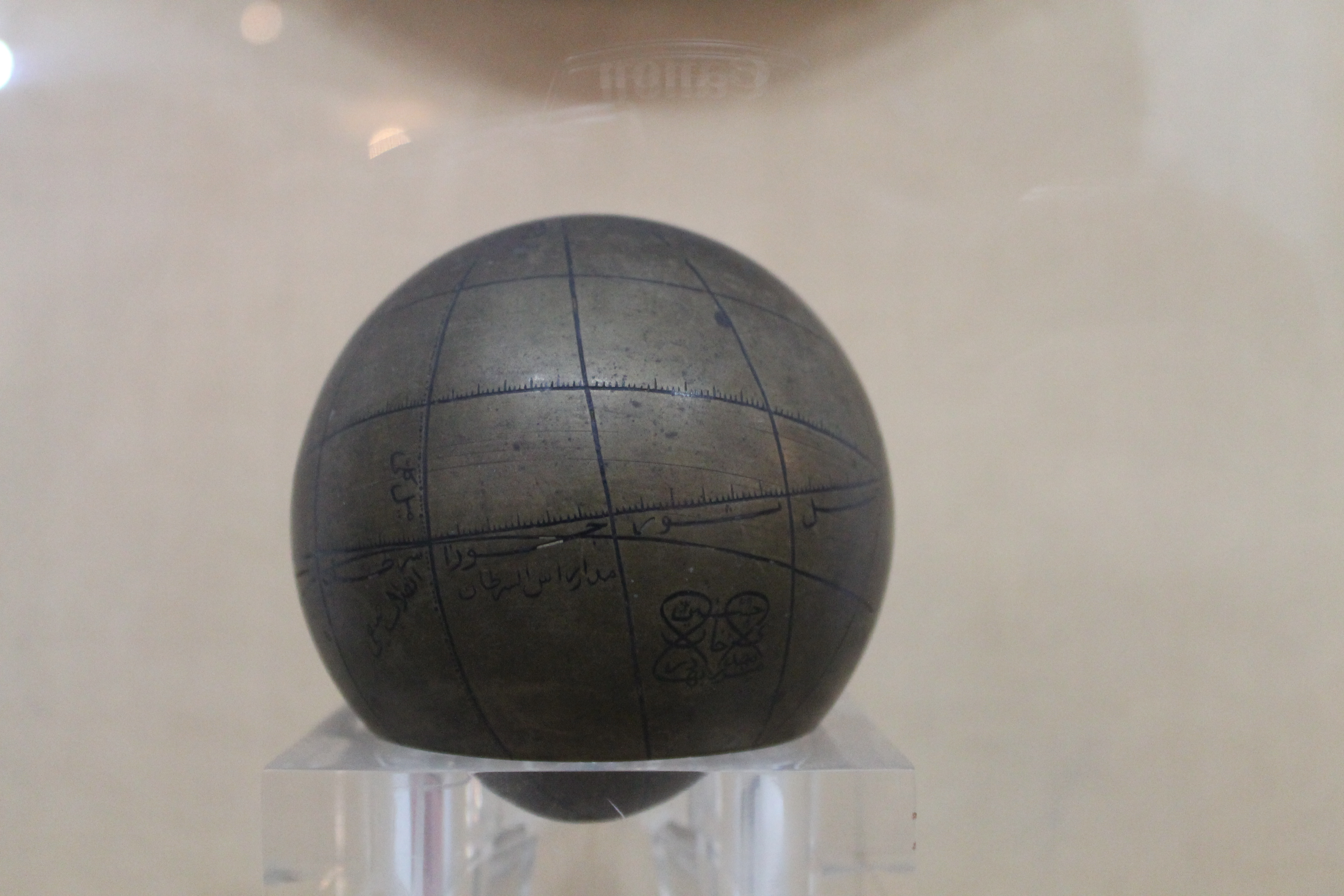
Celestial sphere from the Mughal era at National Museum in New Delhi.

The world's first iron pillar was the Iron pillar of Delhi—erected at the times of Chandragupta II Vikramaditya (375–413), often considered as one of the finest pieces of ancient metallurgy. The swords manufactured in Indian workshops find written mention in the works of Muhammad al-Idrisi (flourished 1154). Indian Blades made of Damascus steel found their way into Persia. European scholars—during the 14th century—studied Indian casting and metallurgy technology. The Rasaratna Samuccaya (16th century CE) explains the existence of two types of ores for zinc metal, one of which is ideal for metal extraction while the other is used for medicinal purpose. Indian metallurgy under the Mughal emperor Akbar (reign: 1556–1605) produced excellent small firearms. Gommans (2002) holds that Mughal handguns were probably stronger and more accurate than their European counterparts.

Srivastava & Alam (2008) comment on Indian coinage of the Mughal Empire (established: April 21, 1526 - ended: September 21, 1857) during Akbar's regime:

Akbar reformed Mughal currency to make it one of the best known of its time. The new regime possessed a fully functioning trimetallic (silver, copper, and gold) currency, with an open minting system in which anyone willing to pay the minting charges could bring metal or old or foreign coin to the mint and have it struck. All monetary exchanges were, however, expressed in copper coins in Akbar's time. In the 17th century, following the silver influx from the New World, silver rupee with new fractional denominations replaced the copper coin as a common medium of circulation. Akbar's aim was to establish a uniform coinage throughout his empire; some coins of the old regime and regional kingdoms also continued.

Statues of Nataraja and Vishnu were cast during the reign of the imperial Chola dynasty (200–1279) in the 9th century. The casting could involve a mixture of five metals: copper, zinc, tin, gold, and silver. The hollow, seamless celestial globe was invented in Kashmir by Ali Kashmiri ibn Luqman in 998 AH (1589-90 CE). Twenty other such globes were later produced in Lahore and Kashmir during the Mughal Empire. These Indian metallurgists pioneered the method of lost-wax casting and disguised plugs in order to produce these globes.

Another area of innovation was the production of astrolabes. A great majority of the surviving astrolabes from the Mughal period were made by seven members of one family who were based in Lahore. A 2006 metallurgical study of eight astrolabes, including six from the Lahore family, found that they used high-zinc brass. This required a more advanced manufacturing process than normal brass, but was easier to work into a thin sheet. The high-zinc process was not used at industrial scale in Europe until the nineteenth century. The study of the Lahore astrolabes suggests that it was in use in the Mughal Empire at the start of the seventeenth century.

=== Native arms production ===
The first iron-cased and metal-cylinder rockets (Mysorean rockets) were developed by the Mysorean army of the South Indian Kingdom of Mysore in the 1780s. The Mysoreans successfully used these iron-cased rockets against the Presidency armies of the East India Company during the Anglo-Mysore Wars.

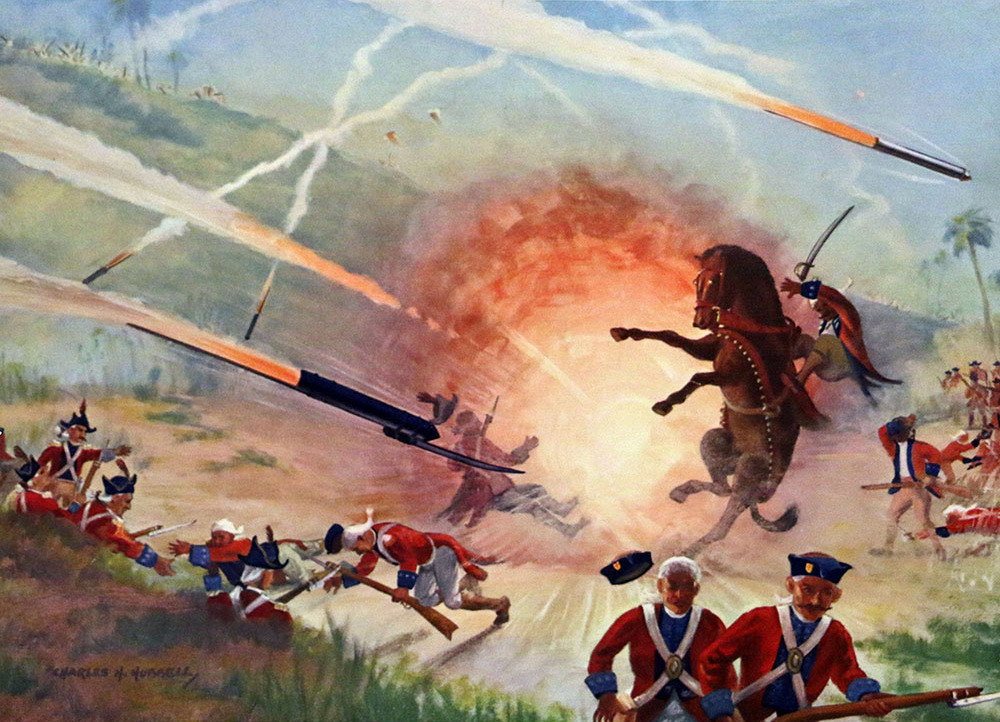
A painting showing the Mysorean army fighting the British forces with Mysorean rockets, which used metal cylinders to contain the combustion powder.

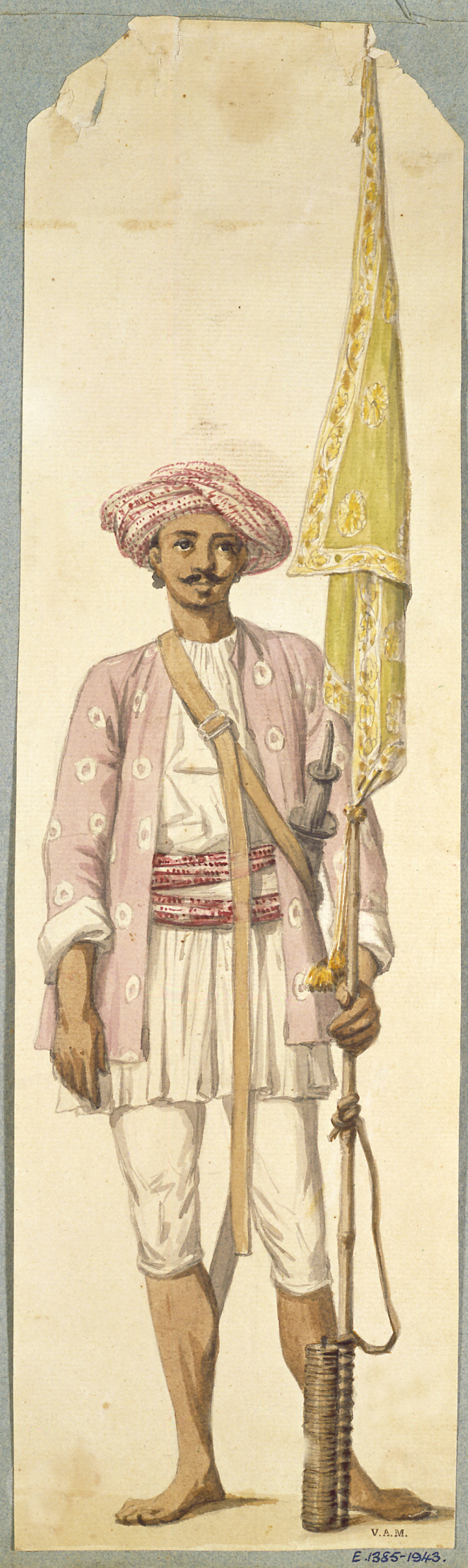
A Mysorean soldier using his Mysorean rocket as a flagstaff (Robert Home, 1793/4).

== Colonial British Era—Republic of India ==
Modern steel making in India began with the setting of first blast furnace of India at Kulti in 1870 and production began in 1874, which was set up by Bengal Iron Works. The Ordnance Factory Board established the Metal & Steel Factory (MSF) at Calcutta, in 1872. The Tata Iron and Steel Company (TISCO) was established by Dorabji Tata in 1907, as part of his father's conglomerate. By 1939 Tata operated the largest steel plant in the British Empire, and accounted for a significant proportion of the 2 million tons pig iron and 1.13 of steel produced in British India annually.

== Terminology for ayas ==
- ayas, loha: metal
- arakutah, riti, pitala: brass
- bhaskara: copper
- hiranya: gold
- kasye, kamsa, kamsya: bell metal/bronze
- krsnayasa, karsnayasa: "black metal"
- jasada: zinc
- lohayasa, lohitayas, lohitam, loha, loham: "red metal", copper, bell metal
- naga: lead
- raitya: brass
- ravi: copper
- sisaga: lead
- syamayas, syama, syamam, syamenayasa: "black metal".
- sisa, sisam, sisaka: lead
- sulva, sulvaka: copper
- tala: bell metal
- tamram, tamra, tamba, tamba loha: copper
- tamrarajas: finely divided copper
- trapu, taua: tin
- tutha: blue vitriol (copper sulphate)
- vanga: tin

=== Other terms ===
- Prastarika: metal trader
- Sulbhadhatusastra: science of metals
- panchaloha, sarva loha: the five base metals (tin, lead, iron, copper, silver)

== See also ==
- Related topics
  - Ancient iron production
  - Crucible steel
  - Damascus steel
  - Dhar iron pillar
  - Early Indian epigraphy
  - Coinage of India
  - Iron pillar of Delhi
  - Iron Age India, Iron Age
  - Rasayana
  - Wootz steel
- Other similar topics
  - Indian copper plate inscriptions
  - History of India
  - Indian copper plate inscriptions
  - List of Edicts of Ashoka
  - Pillars of Ashoka
  - Outline of ancient India
  - Science and technology in ancient India
  - South Indian Inscriptions
