= Samskara (Ayurveda) =

Technique in Ayurvedic medicine

A samskara is a process in Ayurvedic medicine said to detoxify heavy metals and toxic herbs.

In Ayurveda, toxic ingredients, which sometimes include heavy metals such as mercury, are claimed to be purified using a process of prayer and pharmacy. There is little evidence that this process is generally effective, and case reports describe adverse effects of taking these substances.

Metals, minerals or gems if added to herbs contain toxic heavy metals such as lead, mercury and arsenic. Adverse reactions to herbs due to their pharmacology are described in traditional Ayurvedic texts, but Ayurvedic practitioners are reluctant to admit that herbs could be toxic and the reliable information on herbal toxicity is not readily available.

A 2004 study found such toxic metals in 20% of Ayurvedic preparations that were made in South Asia for sale around Boston and extrapolated the data to the United States more broadly. It concluded that excess consumption of these products could cause health risks. A 2008 study of more than 230 products found that approximately 20% of remedies (and 40% of rasa shastra medicines) purchased over the Internet from both US and Indian suppliers contained lead, mercury or arsenic.

According to Ayurveda, each person has a unique combination of three doshas, which are responsible for controlling various bodily functions. , the Government of India ruled that Ayurvedic products must specify their metallic content directly on the labels of the product; however, M. S. Valiathan noted that "the absence of post-market surveillance and the paucity of test laboratory facilities [in India] make the quality control of Ayurvedic medicines exceedingly difficult at this time.
