= List of endemic and threatened plants of Nagaland =

This is a list of plants from Nagaland that are considered rare, threatened, endangered, or extinct by the IUCN or the Botanical Survey of India.

The BSI status symbols used are extinct (Ex), extinct/endangered (Ex/E), endangered (E), vulnerable (V), rare (R) and indeterminate (I). Two letter state identification codes are used (see ISO 3166-2:IN). The IUCN status is indicated where available.

== Magnoliopsida ==
Species	Family	BSI status	IUCN status	Notes
Begonia wattii	Begoniaceae	E		
Silene vagans	Caryophyllaceae	I		
Senecio rhabdos	Asteraceae	R		Also found in Manipur
Kalanchoe roseus	Crassulaceae	E		Also found in Manipur
Rhododendron elliottii	Ericaceae	I		Also found in Manipur
Rhododendron formosum	Ericaceae	V		Also found in Arunachal Pradesh, Manipur, and Mizoram
Rhododendron johnstoneanum	Ericaceae	I		Also found in Manipur and Mizoram
Rhododendron macabeanum	Ericaceae	R		Also found in Manipur
Michelia punduana	Magnoliaceae	R		Also found in Khasi Hills, Meghalaya
Cyclea watti	Menispermaceae	I		Only found in Nagaland
Acranthera tomentosa	Rubiaceae	V		Also found in Assam and Meghalaya
Ophiorrhiza gracilis	Rubiaceae	I		Only recorded in Kohima
Ophiorrhiza griffithii	Rubiaceae	I		Only found in Nagaland
Ophiorrhiza tingens	Rubiaceae	V		Also found in Assam, Meghalaya, and Tripura
Ophiorrhiza wattii	Rubiaceae	E		Also found in Manipur and Meghalaya
Pimpinella evoluta	Apiaceae	Ex/E		Only recorded in Jakpho in Nagaland
Pimpinella flaccida	Apiaceae	I		Only recorded in Kohima

== Liliopsida ==
Species	Family	BSI status	IUCN status	Notes
Pollia pentasperma	Commelinaceae	I		Also found in Mizoram and Meghalaya
Aerides vandara	Orchidaceae	I		Also found in Assam and Meghalaya
Coelogyne prolifera	Orchidaceae	I		Also found in Khasi Hills
Galeola lindleyana	Orchidaceae	I		Also found in Meghalaya and Sikkim
Liparis pulchella	Orchidaceae	I		Also found in Meghalaya
Renanthera imschootiana	Orchidaceae	E		Also found in Manipur and Mizoram
Hedychium marginatum	Zingiberaceae	Ex		Only found in Nagaland
