= Avitta subsignans =

Scientific classification
- Kingdom: Animalia
- Phylum: Arthropoda
- Class: Insecta
- Order: Lepidoptera
- Superfamily: Noctuoidea
- Family: Noctuidae (?)
- Genus: Avitta
- Species: A. subsignans

Binomial name
- Avitta subsignans Walker, 1858

Species of moth

Avitta subsignans is a moth of the family Noctuidae first described by Francis Walker in 1858. It is found in the Indian subregion and Sri Lanka.

Larval food plants include Cyclea peltata and Stephania japonica.
