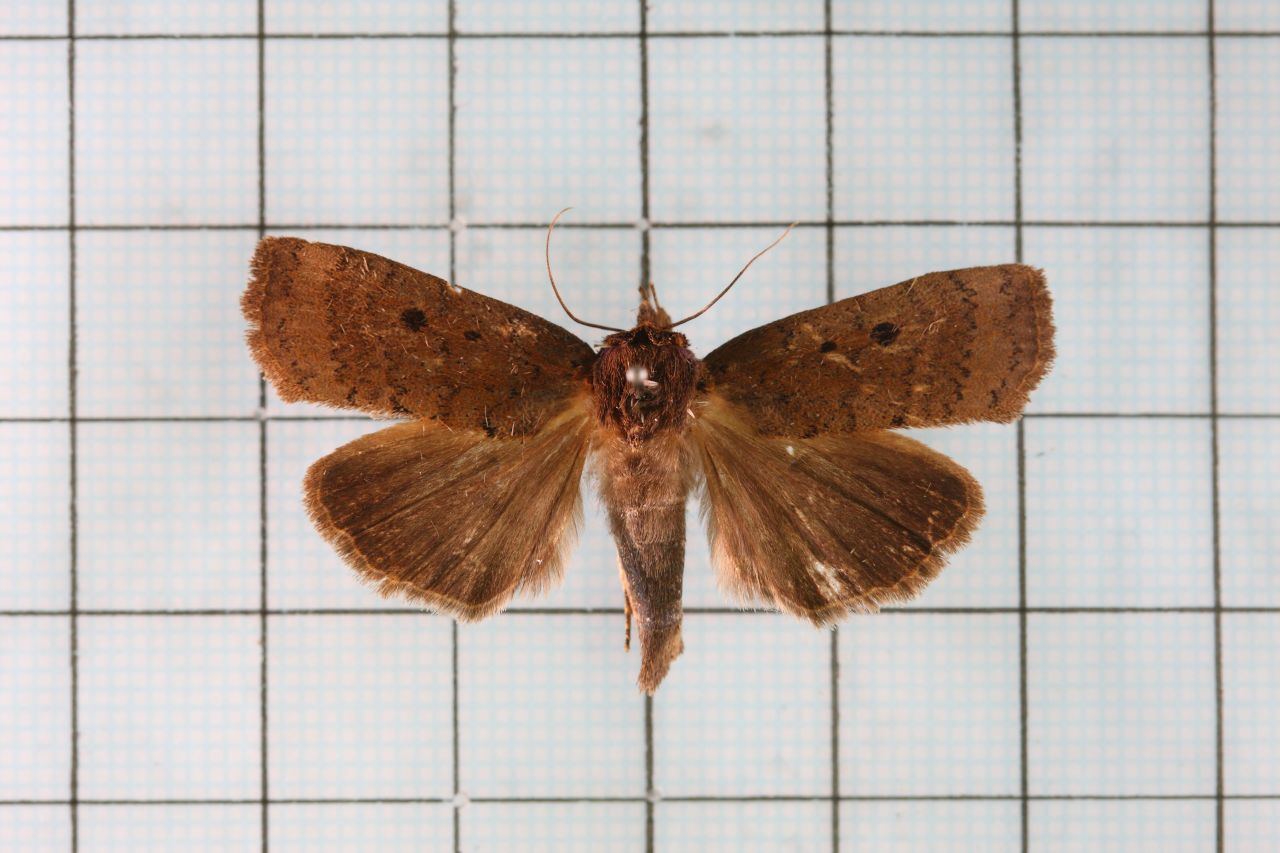

Scientific classification
- Domain: Eukaryota
- Kingdom: Animalia
- Phylum: Arthropoda
- Class: Insecta
- Order: Lepidoptera
- Superfamily: Noctuoidea
- Family: Noctuidae (?)
- Genus: Avitta
- Species: A. puncta

Binomial name
- Avitta puncta Wileman, 1911

= Avitta puncta =

Species of moth

Avitta puncta is a moth of the family Noctuidae first described by Wileman in 1911. It is found in Japan and Taiwan.

The wingspan is 37–40 mm.
