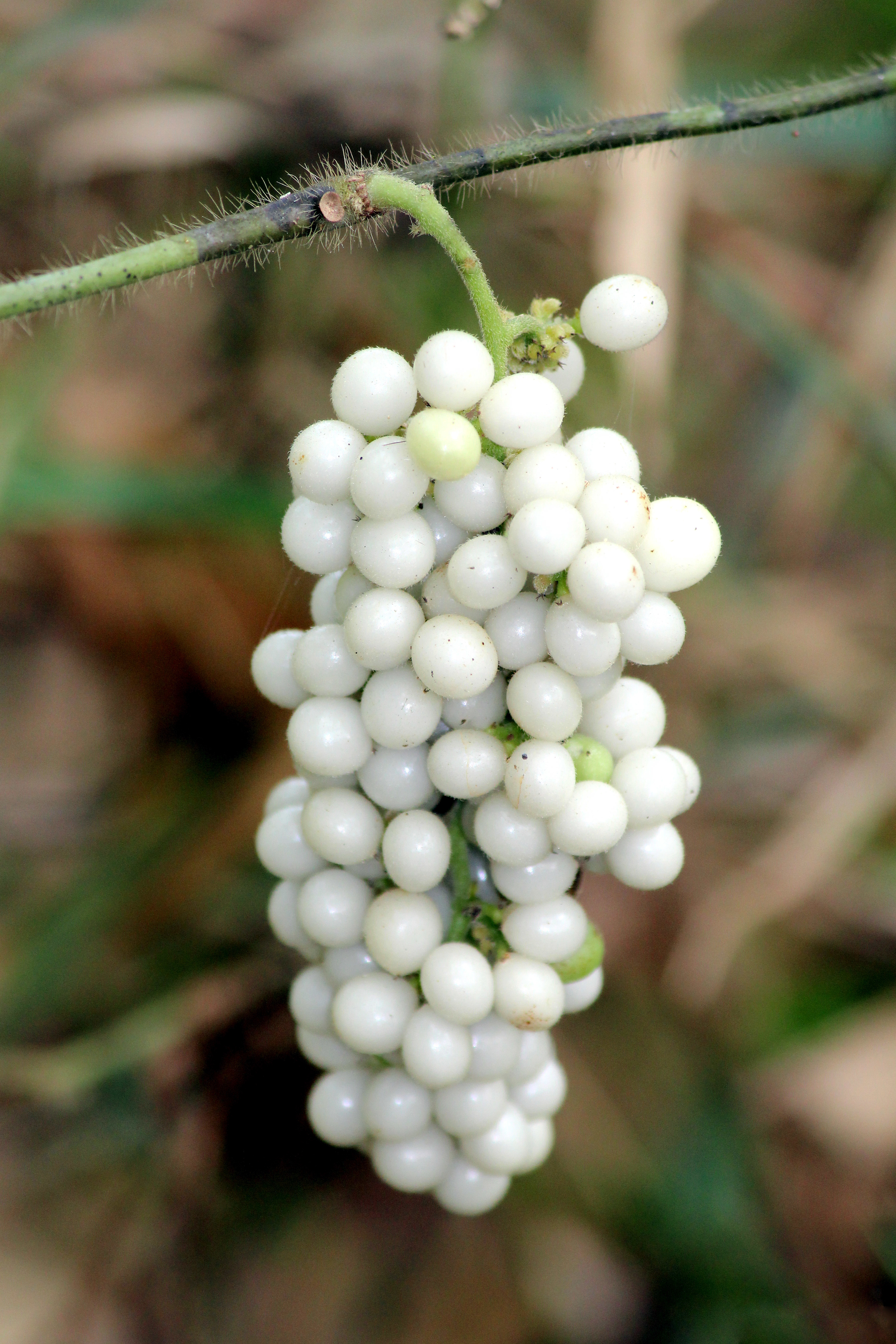

Scientific classification
- Kingdom: Plantae
- Clade: Tracheophytes
- Clade: Angiosperms
- Clade: Eudicots
- Order: Ranunculales
- Family: Menispermaceae
- Genus: Cyclea
- Species: C. peltata

Binomial name
- Cyclea peltata Hook. fil. & Thoms

= Cyclea peltata =

Species of shrub

Cyclea peltata, also called patha or Indian moon-seed (not to be confused with Tinospora cordifolia or "heart-leaved moonseed", from the same family Menispermaceae), is a climbing shrub found across India and Sri Lanka, in habitats ranging from Moist Deciduous Forests to Tropical Forests and Plains.

== Description ==
A slender climbing vine that has alternately-arranged heart shaped leaves. Flowers between April-June and then again during November-January, depending on the local climate. Flowers are pale yellow and dioecious. Pollination is mostly through insects. The fruits are white, spherical or oval drupes.

== Uses ==
Cyclea peltata is used in Indigenous Indian medicinal systems as a wound healer, an antidote to poisons, and for various digestive, skin and inflammatory disorders. It is a common component of the traditional Ayurvedic Polyherbal formulation Shaddharana Choornam, along with Plumbago zeylanica, Holarrhena antidysenterica, Picrorhiza kurroa, Aconitum heterophyllum, Terminalia chebula, Berberis aristata and Cyperus rotundus, whose formulation is mentioned in Vagbhata's Ashtāṅgasaṅgraha and Charaka's Charaka Samhita.
