= Cyclea elegans =

Scientific classification
- Kingdom: Plantae
- Clade: Tracheophytes
- Clade: Angiosperms
- Clade: Eudicots
- Order: Ranunculales
- Family: Menispermaceae
- Genus: Cyclea
- Species: C. elegans

Binomial name
- Cyclea elegans King, 1889

Synonyms
- Cyclea caudata Merr., 1922; Cyclea acuminatissima Merr., 1938; Cyclea tonkinensis sensu Yamam., 1944; Cyclea scyphigera Suess. & Heine, 1950; Cyclea scyphigera f. angustifolia Suess. & Heine, 1950.

Species of flowering plant

Cyclea elegans is a species of flowering plant in the family Menispermaceae. It is found in Sumatra, Malaya, Borneo. An isotype is kept at Kew Gardens Herbarium. It was collected on Mount Kinabalu Dallas.

== Other references ==
- Ridl. in Fl. Mal. Pen. 1922: 115
- Burk. & Hend. Gard. Bull. S. S. 1925: 344
- Yamamota J. Soc. Trop. Agric. 1944: 145
- Yamamoto J. Soc. Trop. Agric. 1944: 145
- Forman Kew Bull. 1960: 71
- Heine Fedde, Rep. 54. 1951: 227
- Diels Pfl. R. 1910: 311
- Airy Shaw Kew Bull. 1940: 538
