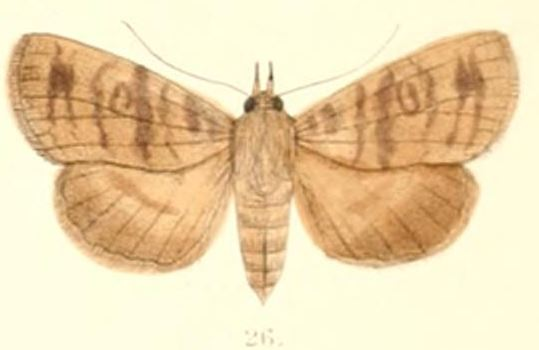

Scientific classification
- Domain: Eukaryota
- Kingdom: Animalia
- Phylum: Arthropoda
- Class: Insecta
- Order: Lepidoptera
- Superfamily: Noctuoidea
- Family: Noctuidae (?)
- Genus: Avitta
- Species: A. fasciosa

Binomial name
- Avitta fasciosa Moore, 1882

= Avitta fasciosa =

Species of moth

Avitta fasciosa is a moth of the family Erebidae first described by Frederic Moore in 1882.

== Distribution ==
It is found in Asia from India to Hong Kong, Japan, Taiwan, Borneo, Peninsular Malaysia and Java.

== Subspecies ==
- Avitta fasciosa fasciosa Moore, 1882
- Avitta fasciosa gracilis Holloway - from Java and Borneo

== Biology ==
The males of this species have a wingspan of 19–22 mm.

The larvae had been recorded on Cocculus sp. (Menispermaceae).
