= Avitta rufifrons =

Scientific classification
- Domain: Eukaryota
- Kingdom: Animalia
- Phylum: Arthropoda
- Class: Insecta
- Order: Lepidoptera
- Superfamily: Noctuoidea
- Family: Noctuidae (?)
- Genus: Avitta
- Species: A. rufifrons

Binomial name
- Avitta rufifrons (Moore, 1887)

Synonyms
- Pantura rufifrons Moore, 1887

Species of moth

Avitta rufifrons is a moth of the family Noctuidae first described by Frederic Moore in 1887. It is found in the Indian subregion, Sri Lanka, New Guinea, and Queensland, Australia.

Generally, both wings are uniform blackish brown. A purplish tint is found on the forewings. There are four diffusely darker, obscure fasciae. Head and forelegs are dull rufous orange. Cinnamomum zeylanicum is the larval food plant.
