= Traditional Knowledge Digital Library =

Indian medical library project

- Location: Vigyan Suchna Bhawan 14, Satsang Vihar Marg, New Delhi-110067, India, India
- Type: Digital library
- Scope: traditional knowledge
- Established: 2001

Other information
- Website: www.tkdl.res.in

The Traditional Knowledge Digital Library (TKDL) is an Indian digital knowledge repository of the traditional knowledge, especially about medicinal plants and formulations used in Indian systems of medicine.

== History ==
Set up in 2001, as a collaboration between the Council of Scientific and Industrial Research (CSIR) and then-Ministry of Health and Family Welfare (India) the objective of the library is to protect the ancient and traditional knowledge of the country from exploitation through biopiracy and unethical patents, by documenting it electronically and classifying it as per international patent classification systems. Apart from that, the non-patent database serves to foster modern research based on traditional knowledge, as it simplifies access to this vast knowledge of remedies or practices.

As of 2010, it had transcribed 148 books on Ayurveda, Unani, Siddha and Yoga in public domain, into 34 million pages of information, translated into five languages — English, German, French, Spanish and Japanese. Data on 80,000 formulations in Ayurveda, 1,000,000 in Unani and 12,000 in Siddha had already been put in the TKDL. Plus it has signed agreements with leading international patent offices such as European Patent Office (EPO), United Kingdom Trademark & Patent Office (UKPTO) and the United States Patent and Trademark Office to protect traditional knowledge from biopiracy, by giving patent examiners at international patent offices access to the TKDL database for patent search and examination.

The issue of biopiracy and unethical bioprospecting made headlines after the government of India successfully revoked or limited turmeric and basmati rice patents granted by United States Patent and Trademark Office (USPTO) and the neem patent granted by European Patent Office (EPO) in the late 1990s. Soon more such patent claims came to light. India’s vast traditional medicine knowledge existed in languages like Sanskrit, Hindi, Arabic, Persian, Urdu, and Tamil, making it inaccessible for examiners at international patent offices to verify claims. This experience prompted the Department of AYUSH, government of India to create a task force of experts in the areas of traditional medicine systems of India (i.e., Ayurveda, Unani, Siddha and Yoga), patent examiners, IT experts, scientists and technical officers, for the creation Traditional Knowledge Digital Library (TKDL). It was initiated in 2001. The tasks included, for example, transcribing Sanskrit shlokas which describe an Ayurvedic formulation in text, using Traditional Knowledge Resource Classification (TKRC) devised for the purpose, so that it is easily understandable to any patent examiner, anywhere in the world. For this reason, the entire 34 million pages of text is available in English, German, French, Spanish and Japanese.

As the database project reached its completion, in 2006 the government allowed access to the library to international patent offices, including European Patent Office (EPO), Japan and the UK, subject to a non-disclosure clause. This allows patent examiners to evaluate patent applications and stop attempts to patent traditional knowledge as "new" inventions.

Agreements were signed with EPO in February 2009, with United Kingdom Trademark & Patent Office (UKPTO) in January 2010, and with the U.S. Patent and Trademark Office (USPTO) after the summit meeting between US President Barack Obama and Prime Minister Manmohan Singh, also in January 2010. With patent examiners getting access to the TKDL database, legal cases regarding unethical patent claims, which had taken years and vast expenditure for each case, could be avoided. From 2009 to 2011, EPO identified 36 patents making improper use of Indian traditional knowledge.

Another project to include data relating to 1,500 postures in yoga began in 2008, after new reports of a large number of false gurus and yoga masters, who attempted to patent this ancient knowledge in their own countries. For example, 131 yoga-related patents were traced in the US alone in 2007. After an uproar in the parliament and media, the government of India took up the issue with the USPTO. Thereafter, a team of yoga gurus from nine schools working with government officials and 200 scientists from the Council of Scientific and Industrial Research (CSIR) scanned 35 ancient texts including the Hindu epics, the Mahabharata and the Bhagwad Gita, and Patanjali's Yoga Sutras to register each native pose. At the end of 2009, 1500 asanas were to be added.

In 2010, Union Environment Minister, Jairam Ramesh stated that over eight years 34 million pages of information have been collected at an estimated cost of Rs 7 crore; at least 36 cases had been identified by the EPO and 40 cases by USPTO, using TKDL. As a future project, a people’s Register of Biodiversity, is being set up by the government, to document and protect, traditional knowledge passed down through the oral tradition, under India’s National Biodiversity Act of 2002.

In 2014, TKDL's administrative mandate was passed on to the newly created Ministry of AYUSH.

== See also ==
- Medical ethnobotany of India
