= Avitta ophiusalis =

Scientific classification
- Kingdom: Animalia
- Phylum: Arthropoda
- Class: Insecta
- Order: Lepidoptera
- Superfamily: Noctuoidea
- Family: Noctuidae (?)
- Genus: Avitta
- Species: A. ophiusalis

Binomial name
- Avitta ophiusalis (Walker, [1859])

Synonyms
- Pantura ophiusalis Walker, 1858; Bocana ophiusalis Walker, [1859] 1858; Toxocampa lunifera Druce; 1888; Imleanga fluviatilis Lucas, 1901

Species of moth

Avitta ophiusalis is a moth of the family Noctuidae first described by Francis Walker in 1859. It is found in Indian subregion, Sri Lanka, China, Japan, Sundaland, Sulawesi, Queensland, Solomon Islands, Vanuatu, Fiji and New Caledonia.

Forewings narrow and pale grey brown. A faint transverse fasciation present. Conspicuous darker marks are found at the reniform which look like a hawk in flight.
