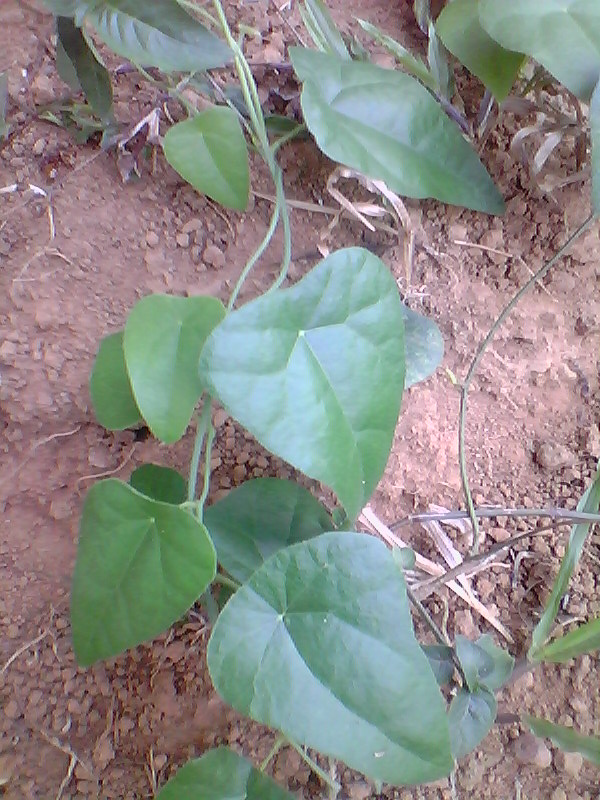
- Cyclea peltata from Kerala, India

Scientific classification
- Kingdom: Plantae
- Clade: Tracheophytes
- Clade: Angiosperms
- Clade: Eudicots
- Order: Ranunculales
- Family: Menispermaceae
- Genus: Cyclea; Arn. ex Wight, 1840

Type species
- Cyclea burmannii (DC.) Hook.f. & Thomson, 1855

Species
- See text

Synonyms
- Lophophyllum Griff., 1854; Paracyclea Kudô & Yamam., 1932

= Cyclea =

Genus of flowering plants

Cyclea is a genus of flowering plants in the family Menispermaceae.

== Accepted species ==
- Cyclea atjehensis
- Cyclea barbata
- Cyclea bicristata
- Cyclea cauliflora
- Cyclea debiliflora
- Cyclea elegans
- Cyclea fissicalyx
- Cyclea gracillima
- Cyclea hypoglauca
- Cyclea insularis
- Cyclea kinabaluensis
- Cyclea laxiflora
- Cyclea longgangensis
- Cyclea meeboldii
- Cyclea merrillii
- Cyclea ochiaiana
- Cyclea peltata
- Cyclea pendulina
- Cyclea peregrina
- Cyclea polypetala
- Cyclea racemosa
- Cyclea robusta
- Cyclea sutchuenensis
- Cyclea tonkinensis
- Cyclea varians
- Cyclea wattii

== Gallery ==
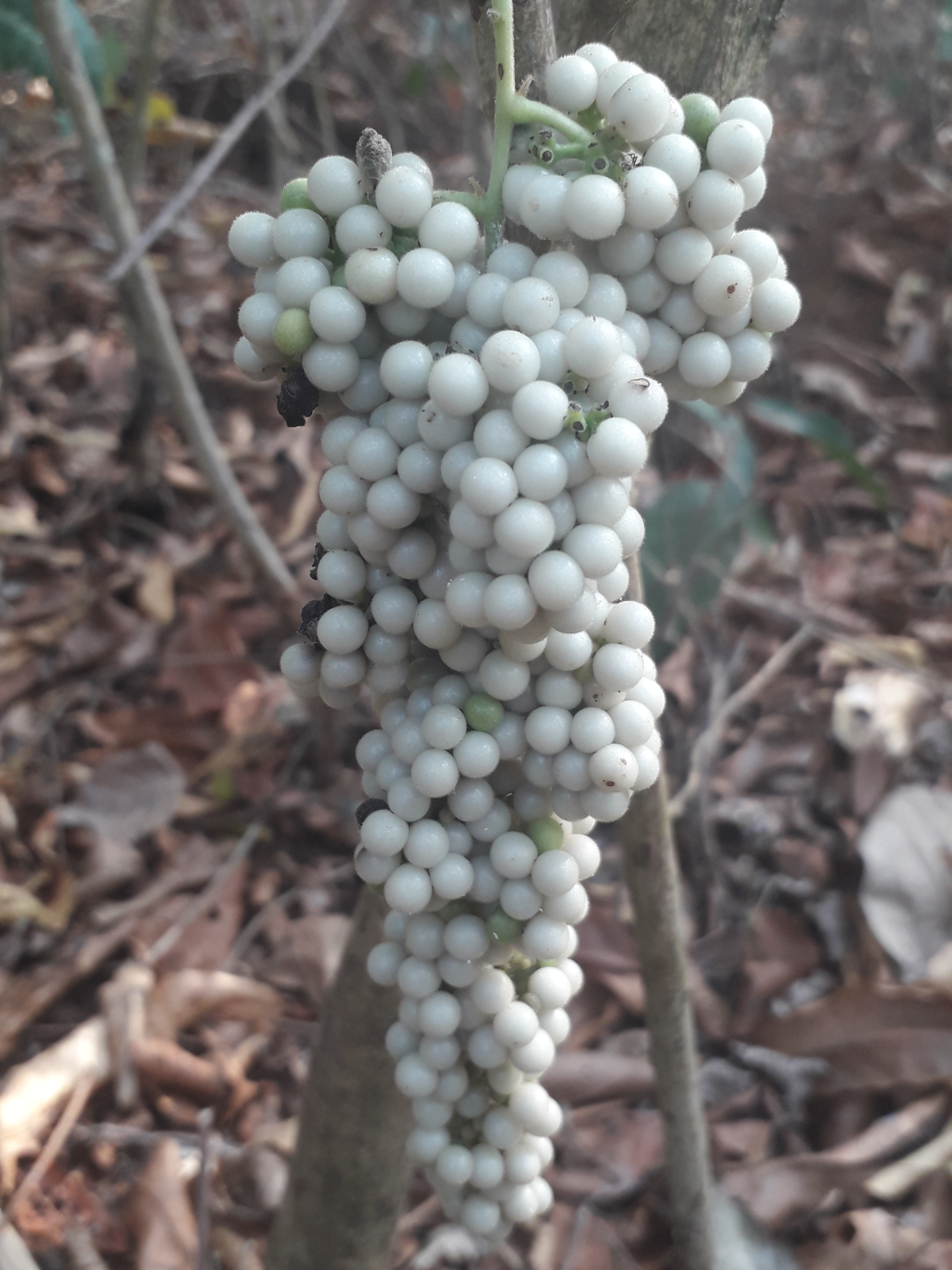
Cyclea peltata
