= Avitta quadrilinea =

Scientific classification
- Kingdom: Animalia
- Phylum: Arthropoda
- Class: Insecta
- Order: Lepidoptera
- Superfamily: Noctuoidea
- Family: Noctuidae (?)
- Genus: Avitta
- Species: A. quadrilinea

Binomial name
- Avitta quadrilinea Walker, 1864

Synonyms
- Asta quadrilinea Walker, 1864; Bocana quadrilinealis Moore, 1867; Imleonga[sic] completa Rothschild, 1915

Species of moth

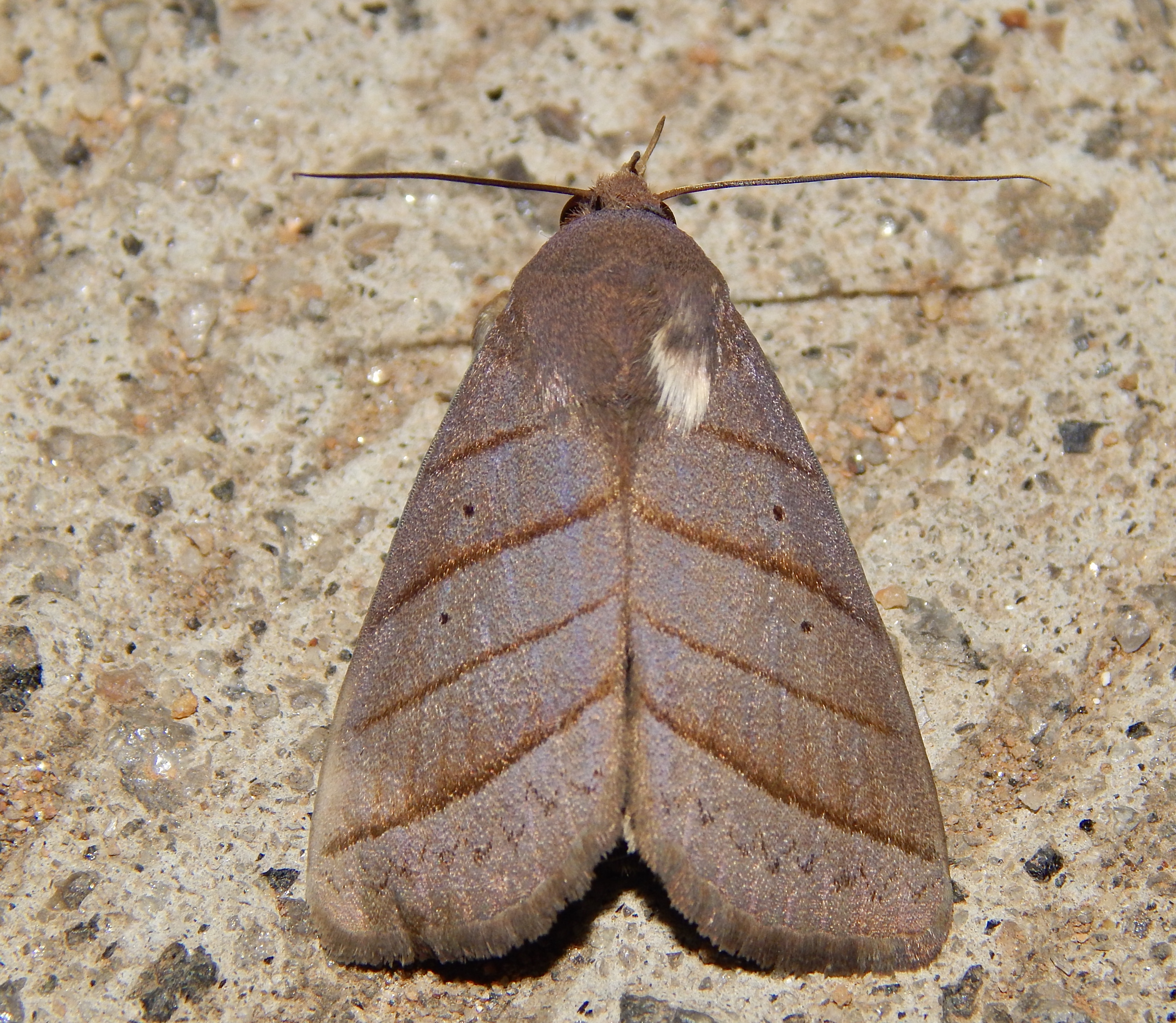
Avitta quadrilinea from Coorg, Western ghats of India

Avitta quadrilinea is a moth of the family Noctuidae first described by Francis Walker in 1863. It is found in Borneo, Peninsular Malaysia, Thailand, the Indian subregion, the Philippines, Sulawesi and Sri Lanka.

Forewings elongated and grey brown. There are four oblique, parallel darker brown fasciae. Reniform dark brown. Caterpillar has a dull yellow head which is surrounded by black. Body uniform dull watery green with yellow segmental margins. It prefer to rest stretched out beneath the tender leaves. Pupa lacks a powdery bloom. Larval host plants include Alseodaphne semecarpifolia and Cinnamomum zeylanicum.

One subspecies is recorded - Avitta quadrilinea completa Rothschild, 1916.
