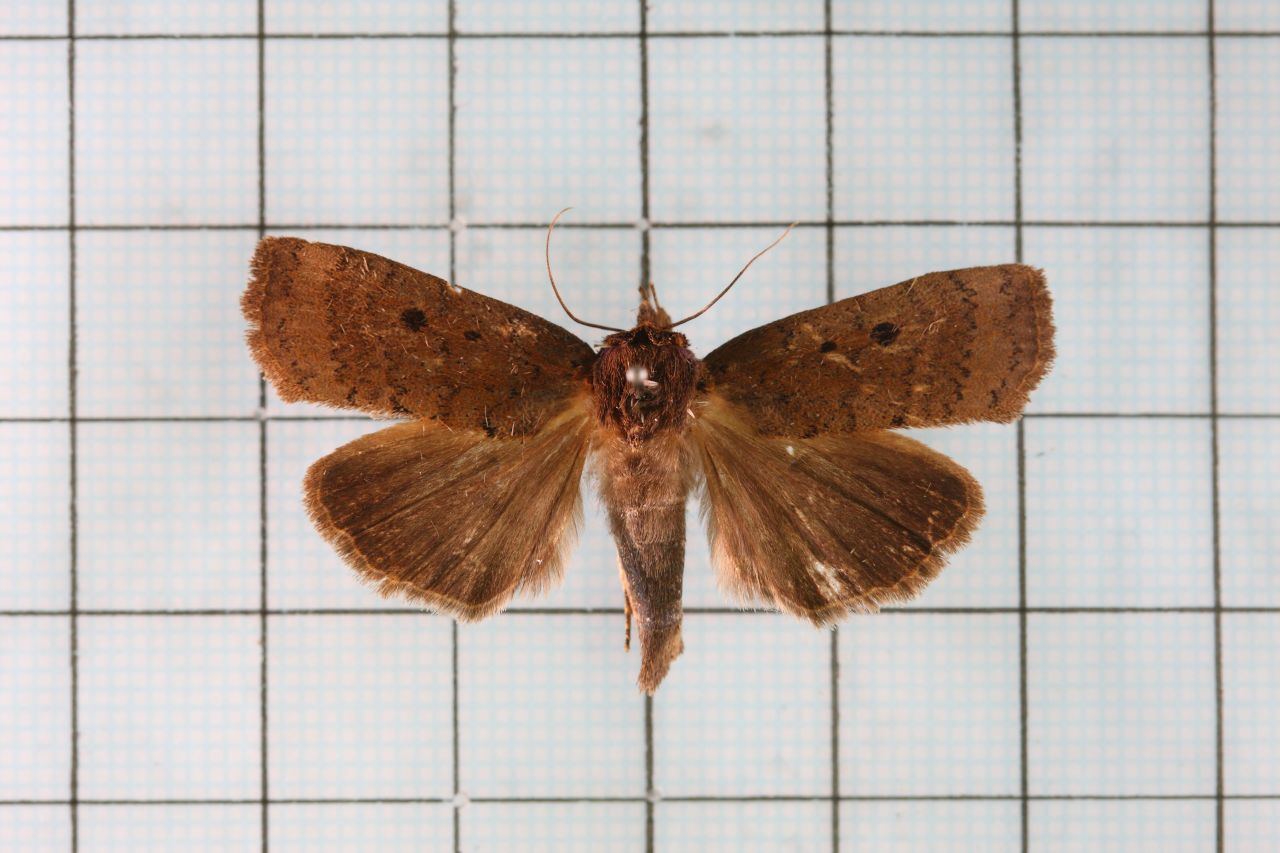
- Avitta puncta

Scientific classification
- Kingdom: Animalia
- Phylum: Arthropoda
- Class: Insecta
- Order: Lepidoptera
- Superfamily: Noctuoidea
- Family: Noctuidae (?)
- Subfamily: Catocalinae
- Genus: Avitta; Walker, 1858

Synonyms
- Asta Walker, [1863]; Oroba Walker, [1863]; Pantura Moore, [1885]; Imleanga Lucas, 1901

= Avitta =

Genus of moths

Avitta is a genus of moths of the family Noctuidae described by Francis Walker in 1858.

== Description ==
Palpi sickle shaped, where the second joint reaching vertex of head. Third joint long and naked. Antennae long and ciliated in male. Thorax and abdomen smoothly scaled. Femur and tibia fringed with hair. Forewings with somewhat rounded apex. Hindwings with vein 5 from just above lower angle of cell.

== Species ==
- Avitta alternans Warren 1903
- Avitta andamana Holloway 1984
- Avitta aroa (Bethune-Baker 1906)
- Avitta atripuncta Hampson 1926
- Avitta bracteola Holloway 1976
- Avitta bryonota Viette 1956
- Avitta ceromacra Berio 1956
- Avitta discipuncta Felder & Rogenhofer, 1874
- Avitta ekeikei (Bethune-Baker 1906)
- Avitta fasciosa Moore, 1882
- Avitta flavicilia Holloway 1976
- Avitta guttulosa (Swinhoe 1900)
- Avitta habrarcha Viette 1956
- Avitta inductalis (Snellen 1880)
- Avitta insignans Hampson 1902
- Avitta insignifica Hampson 1926
- Avitta ionomesa Hampson 1926
- Avitta lineosa (Saalmuller 1891)
- Avitta longicorpus Prout, 1922
- Avitta meeki Holloway 1984
- Avitta microsundana Holloway 1984
- Avitta novahibernia Holloway 198
- Avitta obscurata (Swinhoe 1897)
- Avitta ochromarginata Pagenstecher 1894
- Avitta ophiusalis Walker, [1859]
- Avitta pectinata Holloway 1979
- Avitta polyscia (Joicey & Talbot 1917)
- Avitta puncta Wileman, 1911
- Avitta quadrilinea Walker, [1863]
- Avitta rufifrons Moore, [1887]
- Avitta simplicior Gaede 1940
- Avitta subsignans Walker, 1858
- Avitta surrigens (Walker 1863)
- Avitta taiwana Wileman, 1915
- Avitta zopheropa Turner, 1909
