= Silene vagans =

Scientific classification
- Kingdom: Plantae
- Clade: Tracheophytes
- Clade: Angiosperms
- Clade: Eudicots
- Order: Caryophyllales
- Family: Caryophyllaceae
- Genus: Silene
- Species: S. vagans

Binomial name
- Silene vagans C.B.Clarke

Species of plant

Silene vagans is a flowering plant in the family Caryophyllaceae. The British botanist C. B. Clarke originally described it in 1885.
