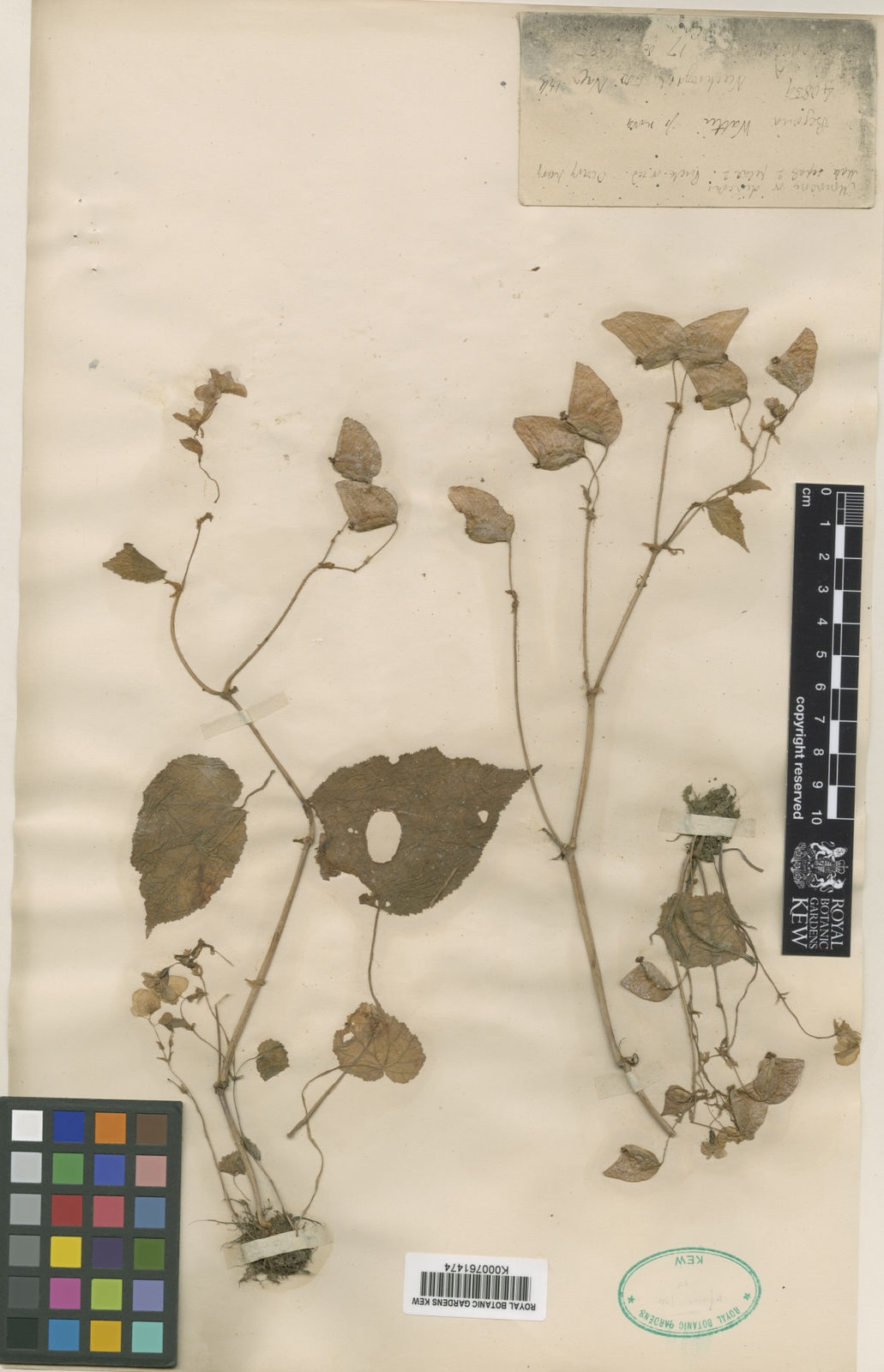
- Plant specimen collected from the Naga Hills in 1885 by C. B. Clarke

Scientific classification
- Kingdom: Plantae
- Clade: Tracheophytes
- Clade: Angiosperms
- Clade: Eudicots
- Clade: Rosids
- Order: Cucurbitales
- Family: Begoniaceae
- Genus: Begonia
- Species: B. wattii

Binomial name
- Begonia wattii C.B.Clarke

= Begonia wattii =

Species of plant

Begonia wattii is a plant of the family Begoniaceae, native to Northeast India. The British botanist C. B. Clarke originally described it in 1885.
