= Magnolia punduana =

Conservation status
- Data Deficient (IUCN 3.1)

Scientific classification
- Kingdom: Plantae
- Clade: Embryophytes
- Clade: Tracheophytes
- Clade: Spermatophytes
- Clade: Angiosperms
- Clade: Magnoliids
- Order: Magnoliales
- Family: Magnoliaceae
- Genus: Magnolia
- Species: M. punduana

Binomial name
- Magnolia punduana (Hook.f. & Thomson) Figlar

Synonyms
- Michelia punduana Hook.f. & Thomson; Sampacca punduana (Hook.f. & Thomson) Kuntze

Species of flowering plant

Magnolia punduana is a species of flowering plant in the family Magnoliaceae. It is a tree native to northeastern India (Arunachal Pradesh, Assam, Meghalaya, and Nagaland) and northern Myanmar. It grows in moist montane tropical and subtropical forests, including the Meghalaya subtropical forests, from 1,000 to 1,600 metres elevation.
