= Cyclea wattii =

Scientific classification
- Kingdom: Plantae
- Clade: Embryophytes
- Clade: Tracheophytes
- Clade: Spermatophytes
- Clade: Angiosperms
- Clade: Eudicots
- Order: Ranunculales
- Family: Menispermaceae
- Genus: Cyclea
- Species: C. wattii

Binomial name
- Cyclea wattii Diels

Species of flowering plant

Cyclea wattii is a plant from the family Menispermaceae, whose native range lies from Nagaland in India to Chongqing, Yunnan and Guizhou in China.

== Range ==
The species is found in Nagaland, India, and Chongqing, Yunnan, and Guizhou provinces of China.
