= Polyherbal formulation =

Use of more than one herb in herbal medicine

Polyherbal formulation (PHF) is the use of more than one herb in a herbal medicine preparation. The concept is found in Ayurvedic and other traditional medicinal systems where multiple herbs in a particular ratio may be used in the treatment of illness. It is used in these systems for the treatment of many diseases, including diabetes. The Ayurvedic text Sarangdhar Samhita, dated 1300 CE, has highlighted the concept of polyherbalism in Ayurveda. In the traditional system of Indian medicine, plant formulations and combined extracts of plants are chosen rather than individual ones. Ayurvedic herbal formulations are prepared in a number of dosage forms, in which mostly all of them are PHF. Due to synergism, polyherbalism confers some benefits which is not available in single herbal formulation.
