= 2025 =

Calendar year

2025 in various calendars
- Gregorian calendar: 2025; MMXXV
- Ab urbe condita: 2778
- Armenian calendar: 1474; ԹՎ ՌՆՀԴ
- Assyrian calendar: 6775
- Baháʼí calendar: 181–182
- Balinese saka calendar: 1946–1947
- Bengali calendar: 1431–1432
- Berber calendar: 2975
- British Regnal year: 3 Cha. 3 – 4 Cha. 3
- Buddhist calendar: 2569
- Burmese calendar: 1387
- Byzantine calendar: 7533–7534
- Chinese calendar: 甲辰年 (Wood Dragon); 4722 or 4515 — to — 乙巳年 (Wood Snake); 4723 or 4516
- Coptic calendar: 1741–1742
- Discordian calendar: 3191
- Ethiopian calendar: 2017–2018
- Hebrew calendar: 5785–5786
- Hindu calendars
- Vikram Samvat: 2081–2082
- Shaka Samvat: 1946–1947
- Kali Yuga: 5125–5126
- Holocene calendar: 12025
- Igbo calendar: 1025–1026
- Iranian calendar: 1403–1404
- Islamic calendar: 1446–1447
- Japanese calendar: Reiwa 7 (令和７年)
- Javanese calendar: 1958–1959
- Juche calendar: 114
- Julian calendar: Gregorian minus 13 days
- Korean calendar: 4358
- Minguo calendar: ROC 114 民國114年
- Nanakshahi calendar: 557
- Thai solar calendar: 2568
- Tibetan calendar: ཤིང་ཕོ་འབྲུག་ལོ་ (male Wood-Dragon); 2151 or 1770 or 998 — to — ཤིང་མོ་སྦྲུལ་ལོ་ (female Wood-Snake); 2152 or 1771 or 999
- Unix time: 1735689600 – 1767225599

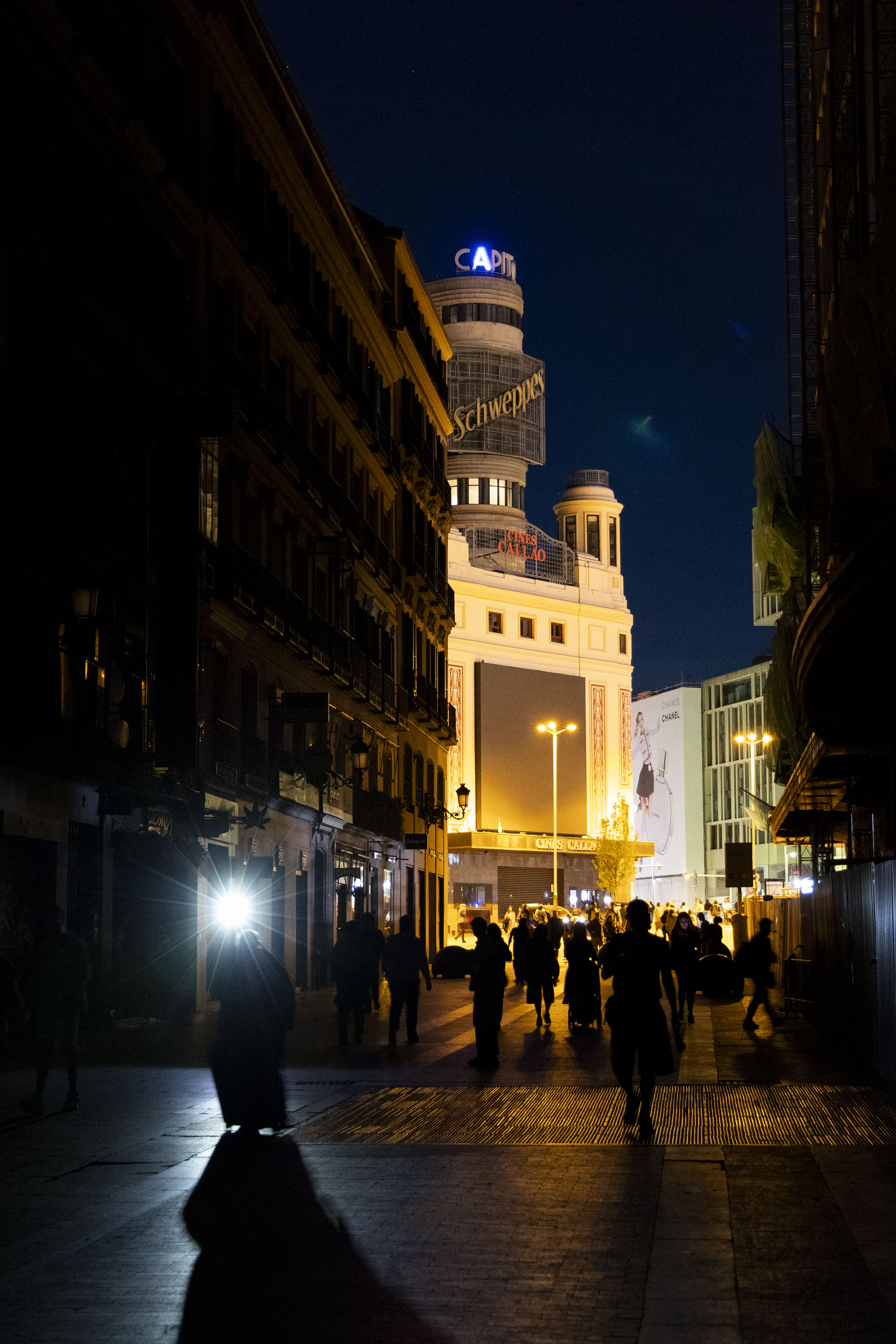
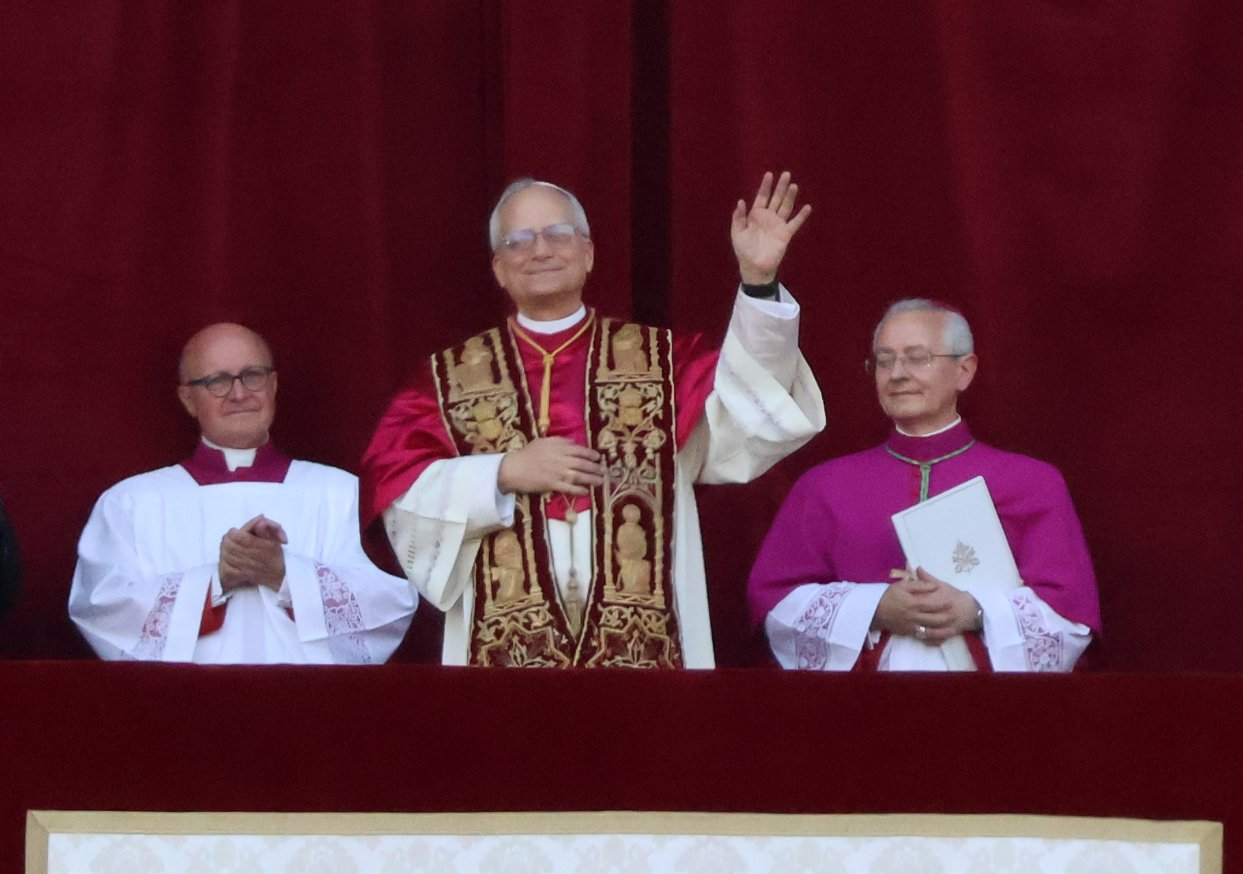
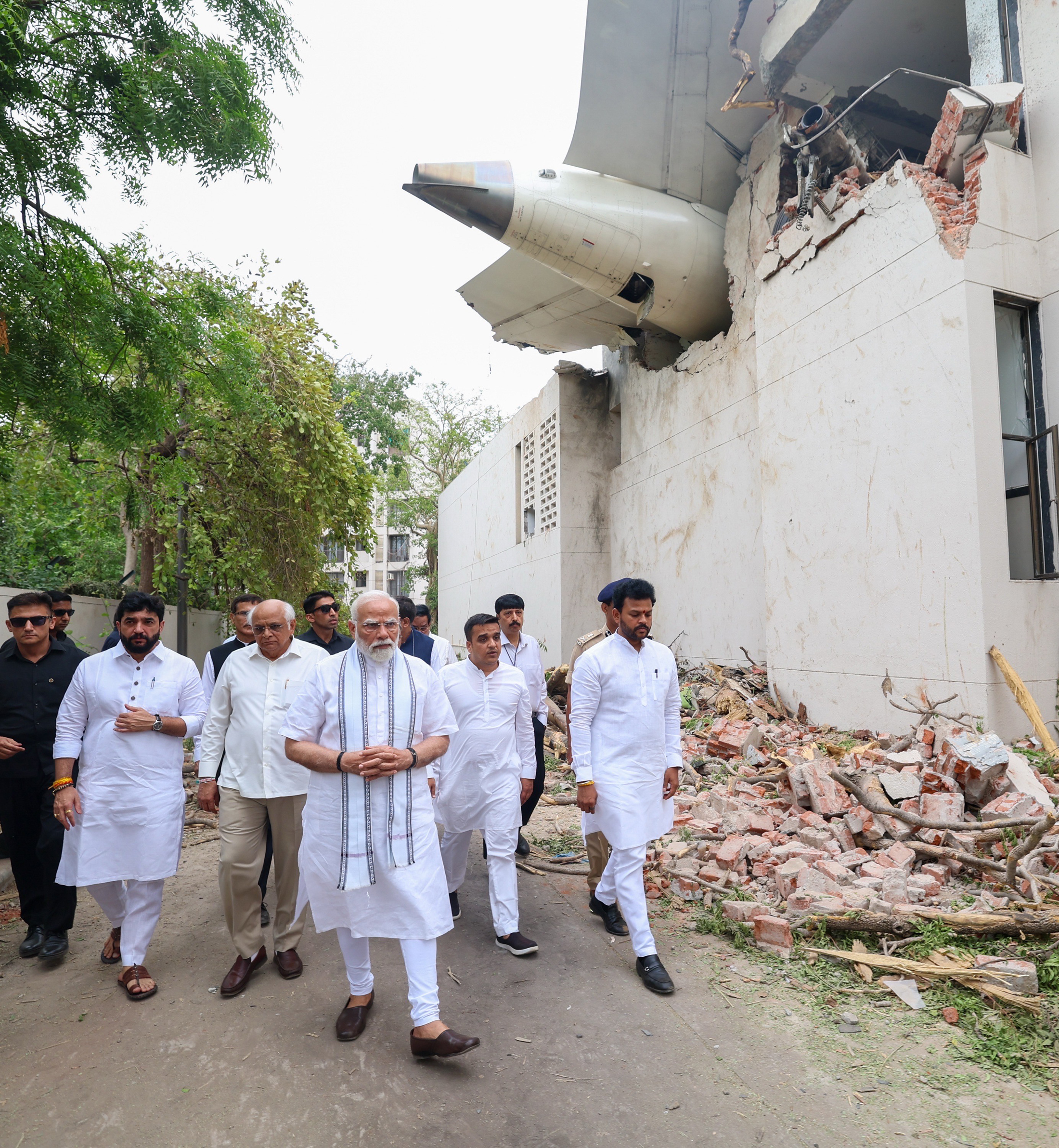
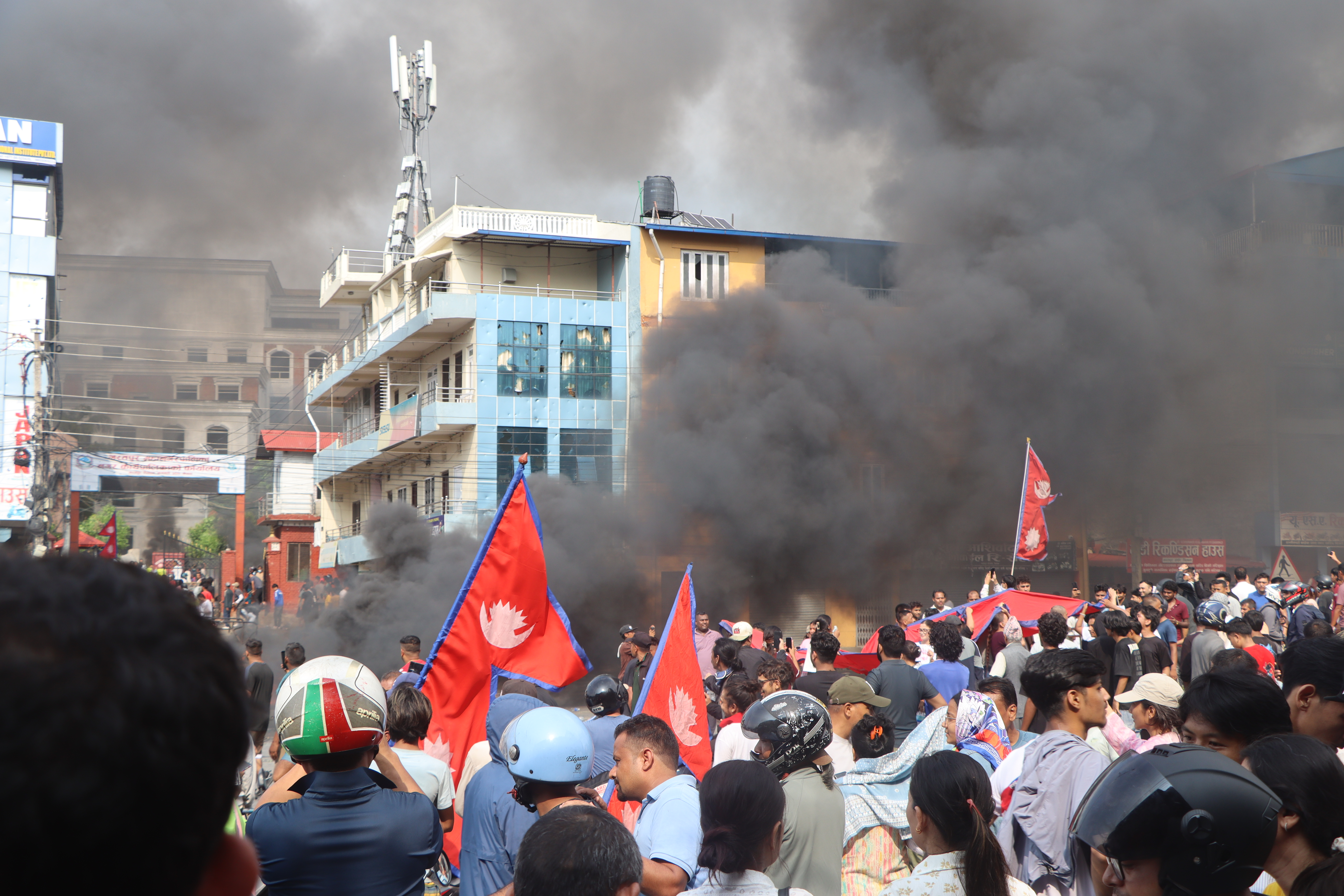
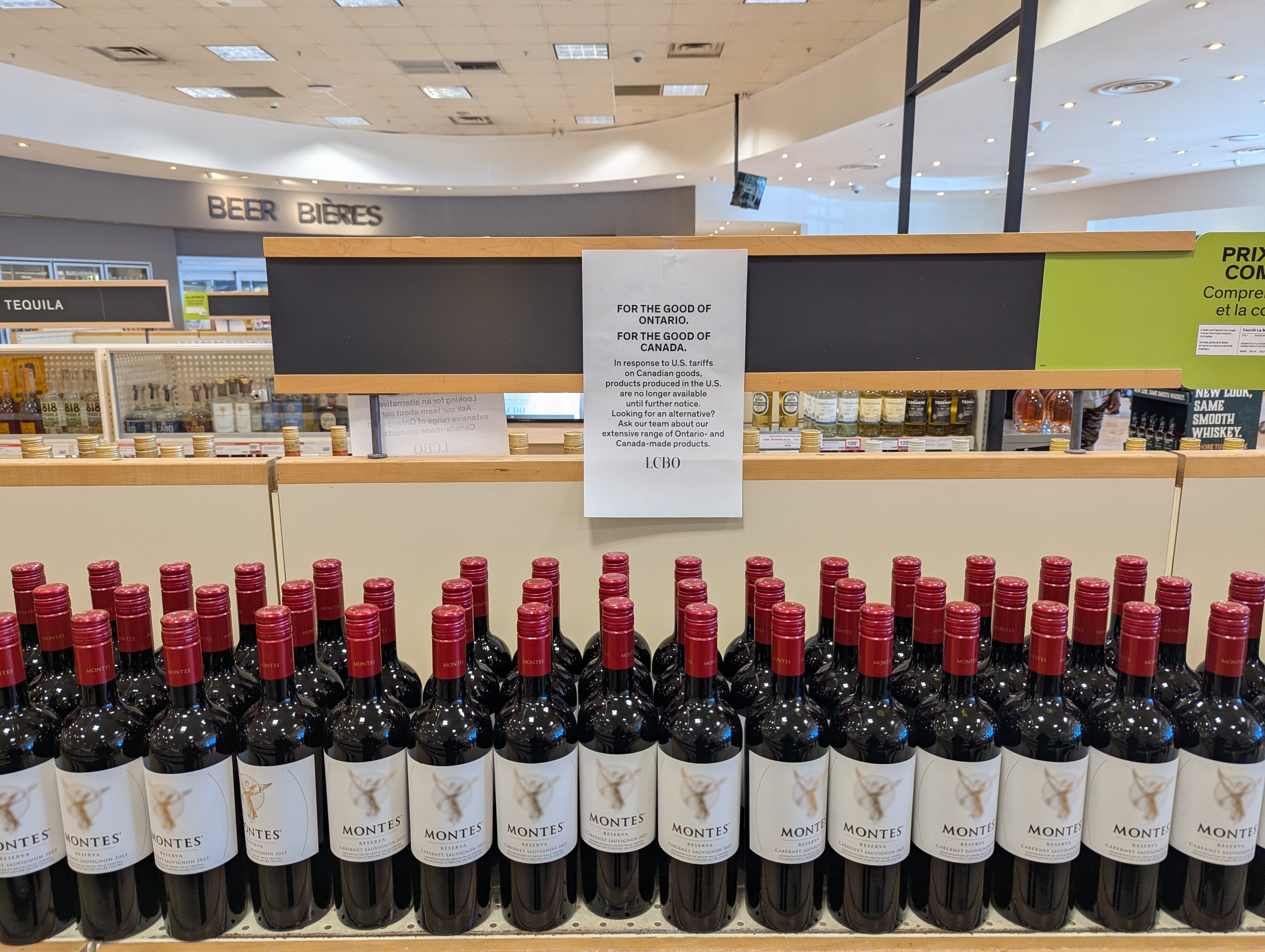
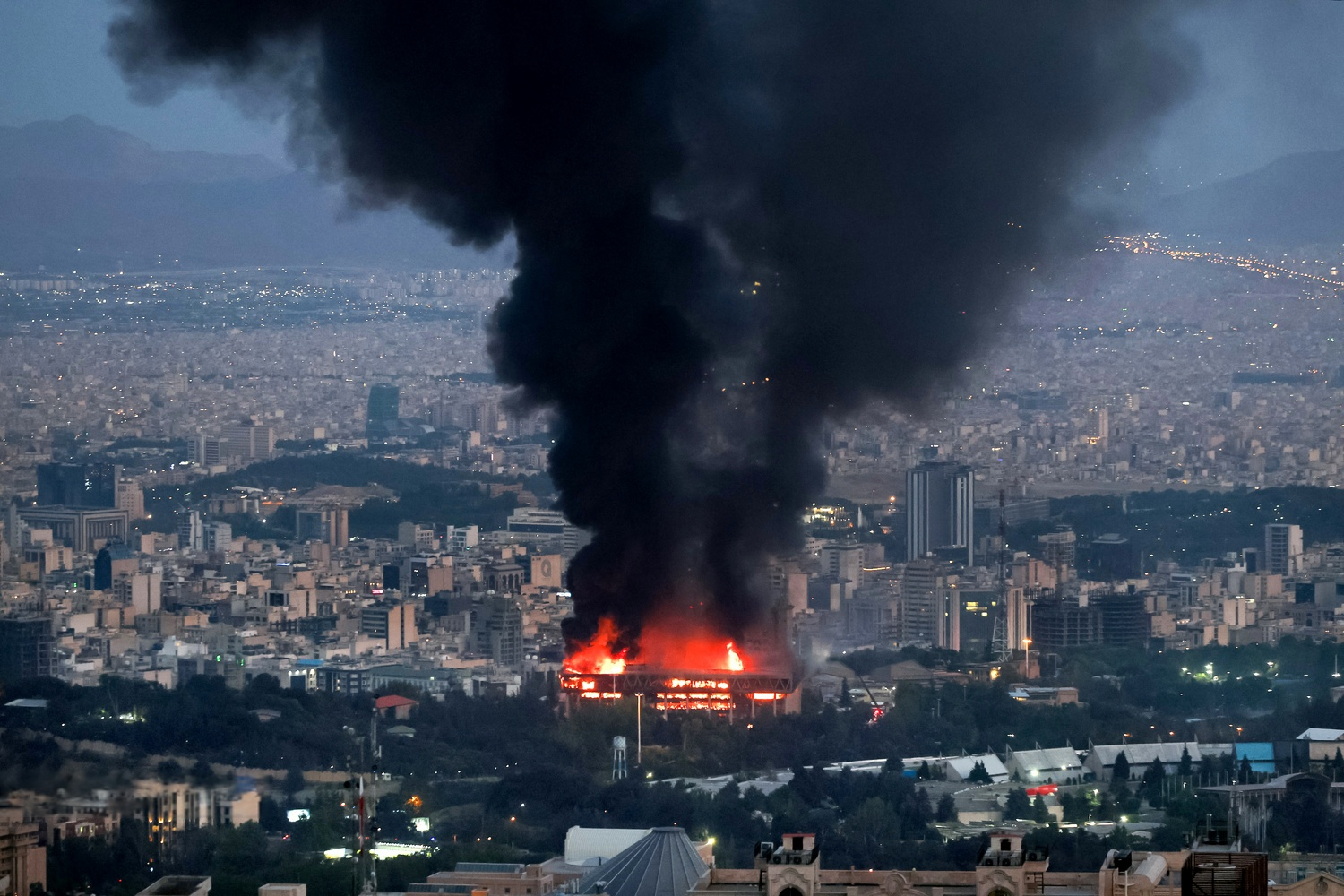
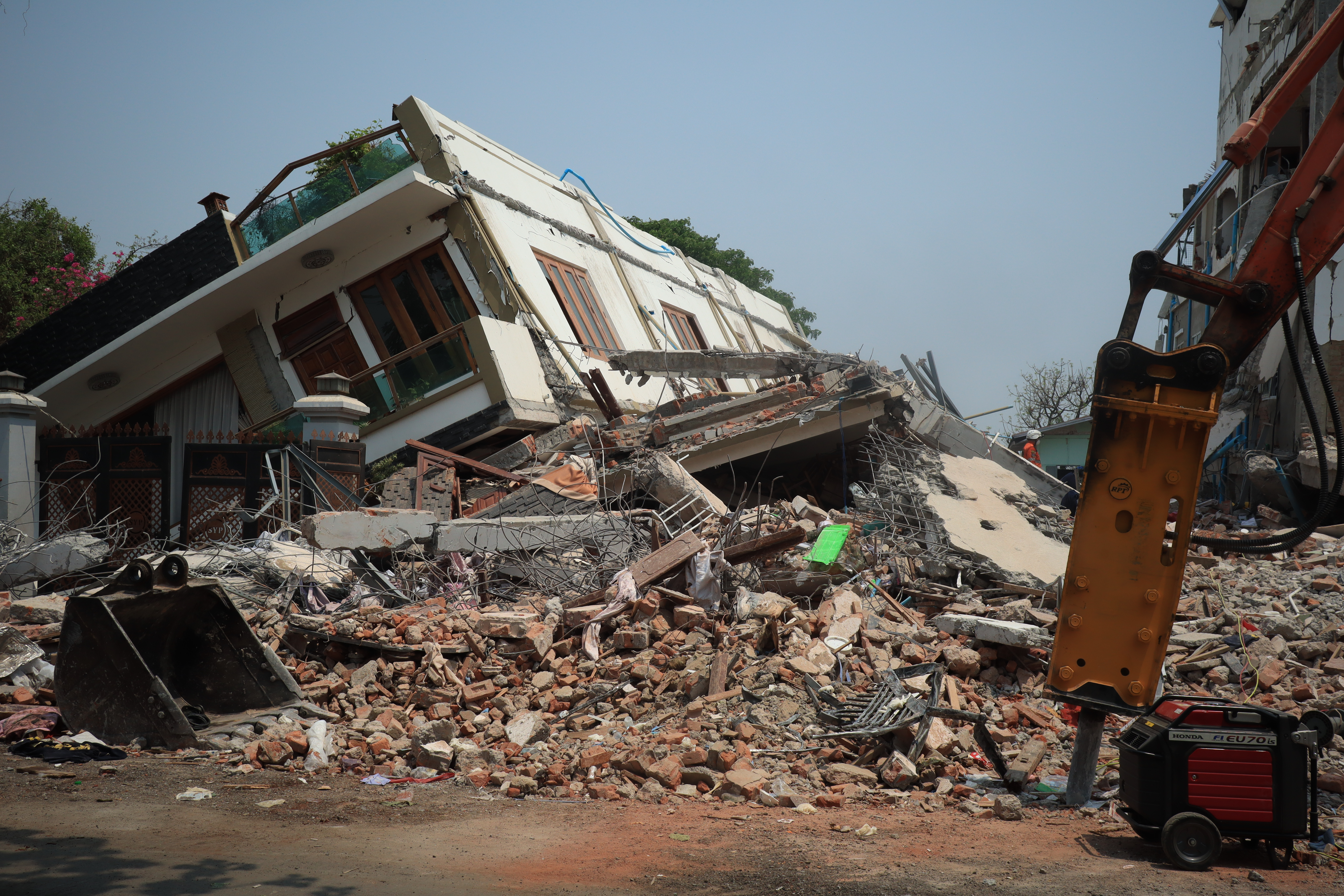
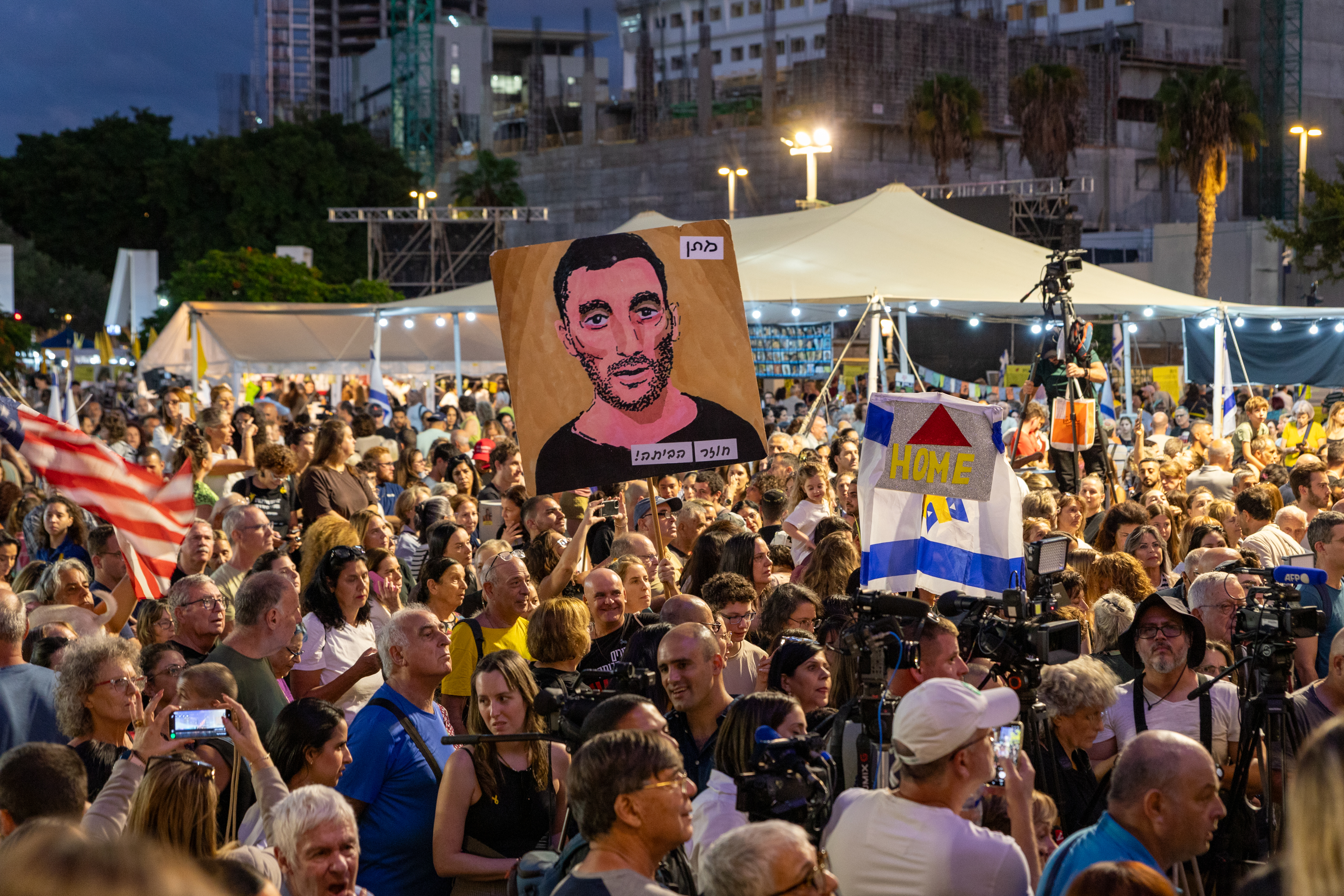
From left to right, top to bottom:
- View from Madrid's Preciados Street towards Callao Square during the Iberian Peninsula blackout, with Preciados still dark while Callao has partial power restored;
- Robert Prevost is elected as Pope Leo XIV following the death of Pope Francis;
- Prime minister Narendra Modi visits the wreckage of Air India Flight 171's tail section wedged into the B. J. Medical College, Ahmedabad;
- Anti-government protests erupt across Nepal, resulting in the resignation of prime minister K. P. Sharma Oli and several government buildings set on fire;
- A LCBO store recommending non-American products (Chilean wines pictured) in response to the Donald Trump tariffs;
- Airstrike on the IRIB studio in Tehran during the Twelve-Day War;
- A magnitude-7.7 earthquake strikes Myanmar, causing more than 5,400 fatalities and extensive damage in Southeast Asia;
- Hostages Square in Tel Aviv after the announcement of the impending release of Israeli hostages in an attempt to end the Gaza war.

2025 (MMXXV) was a common year starting on Wednesday of the Gregorian calendar, the 2025th year of the Common Era (CE) and Anno Domini (AD) designations, the 25th year of the 3rd millennium and the 21st century, and the 6th year of the 2020s decade.

The year saw an escalation of major ongoing armed conflicts, including the Gaza war, marked by famine and a humanitarian crisis and the Russian invasion of Ukraine, which prompted peace negotiations involving Vladimir Putin and Donald Trump; civil wars in Myanmar, Sudan and Yemen also continued throughout the year.

Internal crises in Armenia, Bangladesh, Bulgaria, the Democratic Republic of the Congo, Ecuador, France, Georgia, Germany, Haiti, Libya, Pakistan, Peru, Somalia, and South Korea persisted into the year, with the latter culminating in the arrest and removal of President Yoon Suk Yeol from office. Furthermore, a diplomatic crisis between China and Japan broke out in November.

The year also witnessed a wave of protests predominantly led by Generation Z, with some movements—such as those in Nepal and Madagascar—resulting in the overthrow of targeted governments. Several brief conflicts arising from longstanding tensions emerged mid-year, including clashes between India and Pakistan in May, Iran and Israel in June, and Cambodia and Thailand in July. In the latter case, a leaked phone call involving Thai prime minister Paetongtarn Shinawatra and Cambodian senate president Hun Sen resulted in the removal of the former from office.

In economics and business, the return of Donald Trump to the U.S. presidency ushered in a series of tariffs imposed by the United States on the rest of the world, significantly disrupting global trade and reinvigorating the China–United States trade war. The technology sector was also affected by the release of the DeepSeek chatbot, a Chinese large language model that competed with ChatGPT.

Aviation and aerospace experienced several accidents during the year, including a collision between two aircraft half a mile south of Washington National Airport in January, and the crash of Air India Flight 171, a Boeing 787 bound for Gatwick, in Ahmedabad, India, in June. The year also saw notable advances in space exploration, including the first crewed polar-orbit spaceflight and the first fully successful lunar landing by a private company.

== Events ==
=== January ===
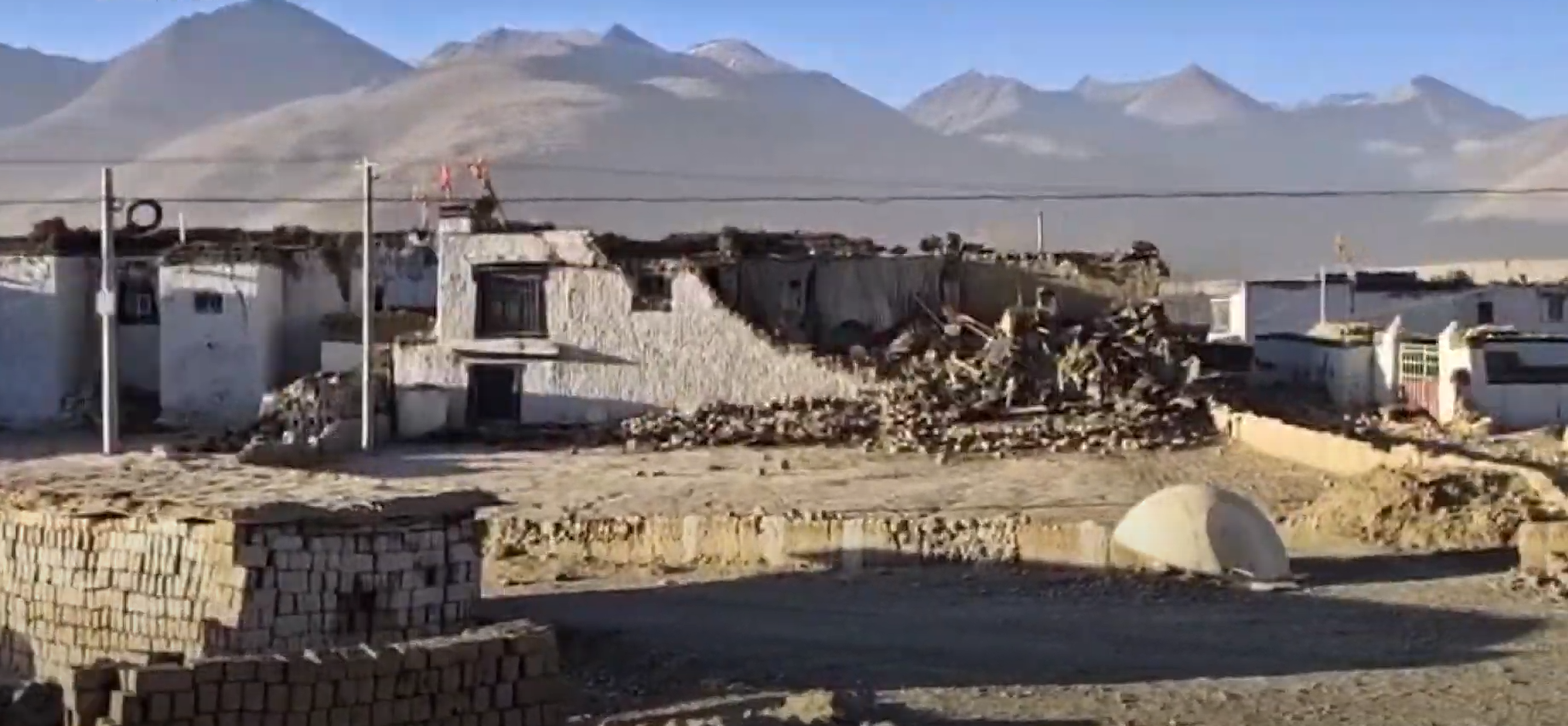
Collapsed house in Tibet after an earthquake measuring M_{w} 7.1 struck on January 7

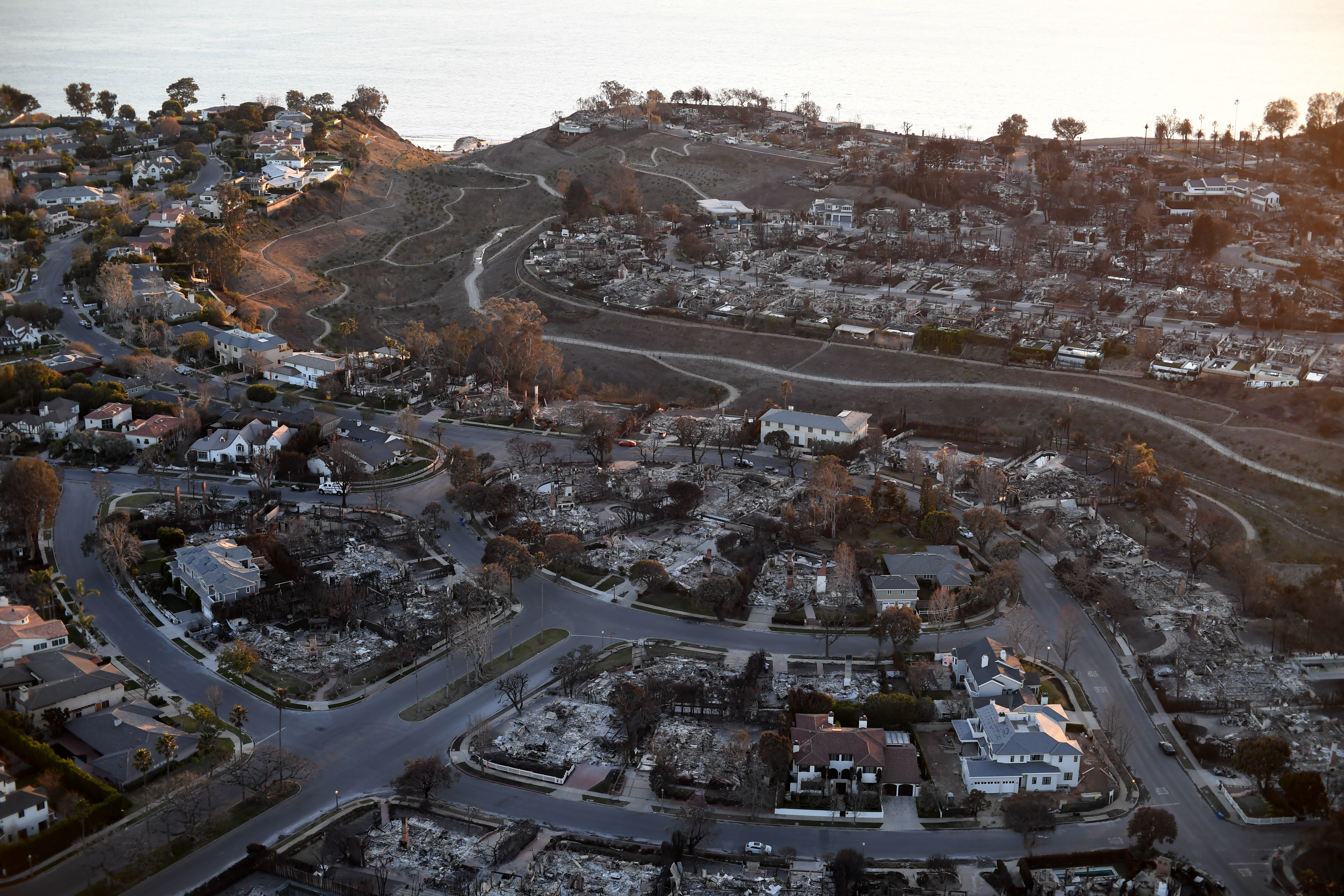
Aerial view of homes devastated by the Palisades Fire in the early evening hours of January 15 as part of the Southern California wildfires

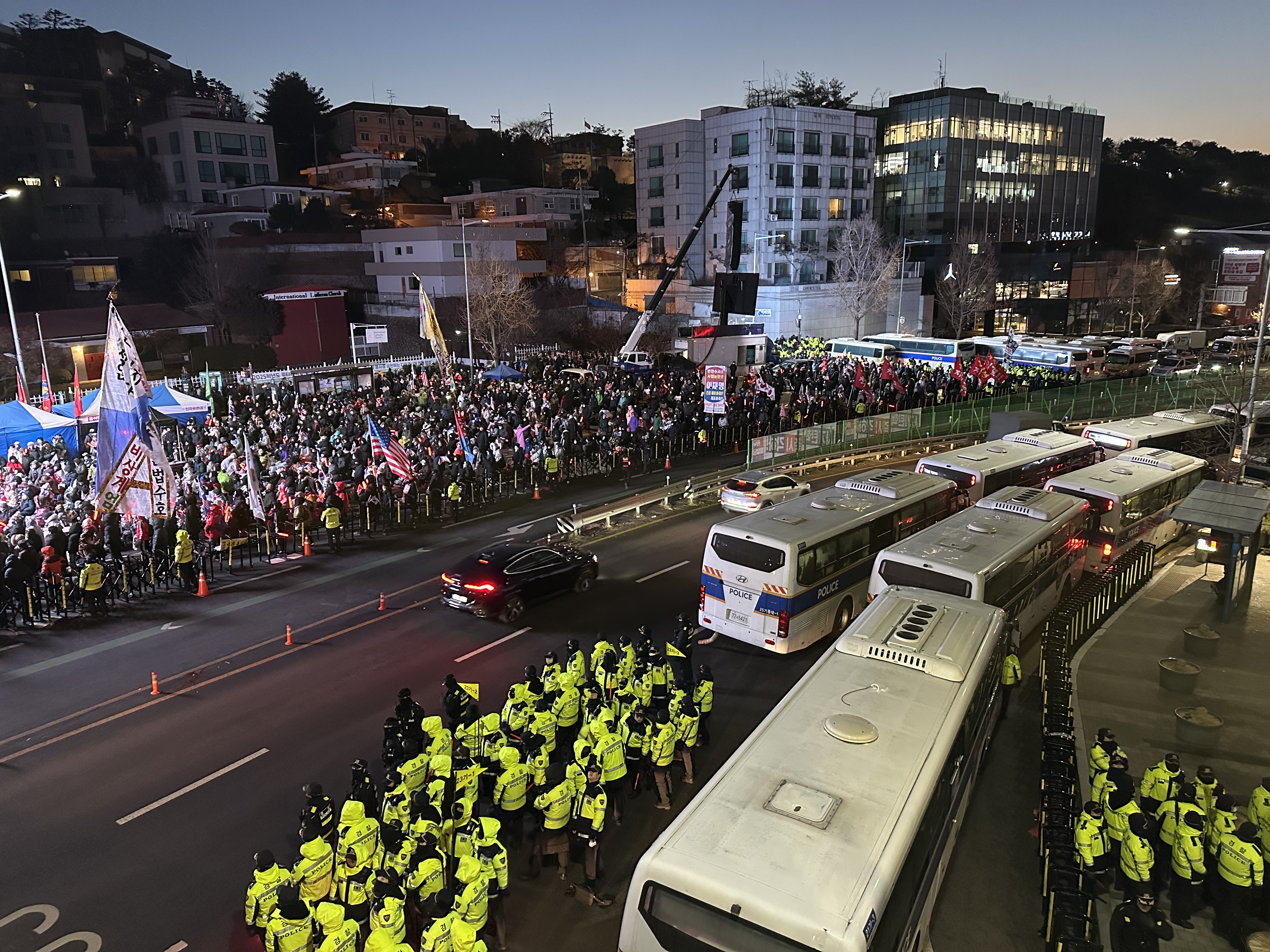
Protestors and police in front of the impeached South Korean president Yoon Suk Yeol's residence hours before his arrest on January 15

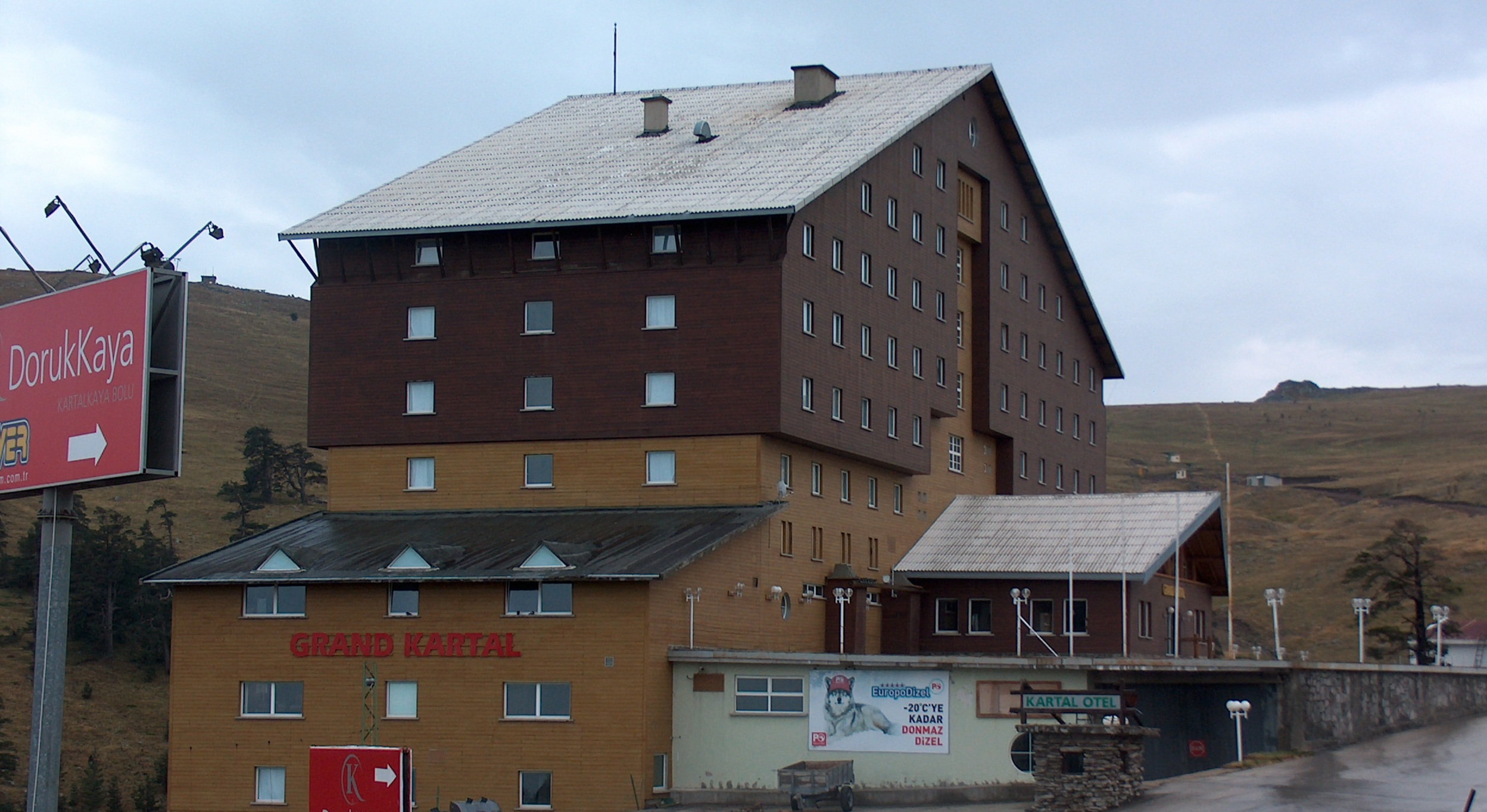
A fire at the Grand Kartal Hotel (pictured) in Kartalkaya, Turkey, killed 78 people and injuring 51 others on January 21

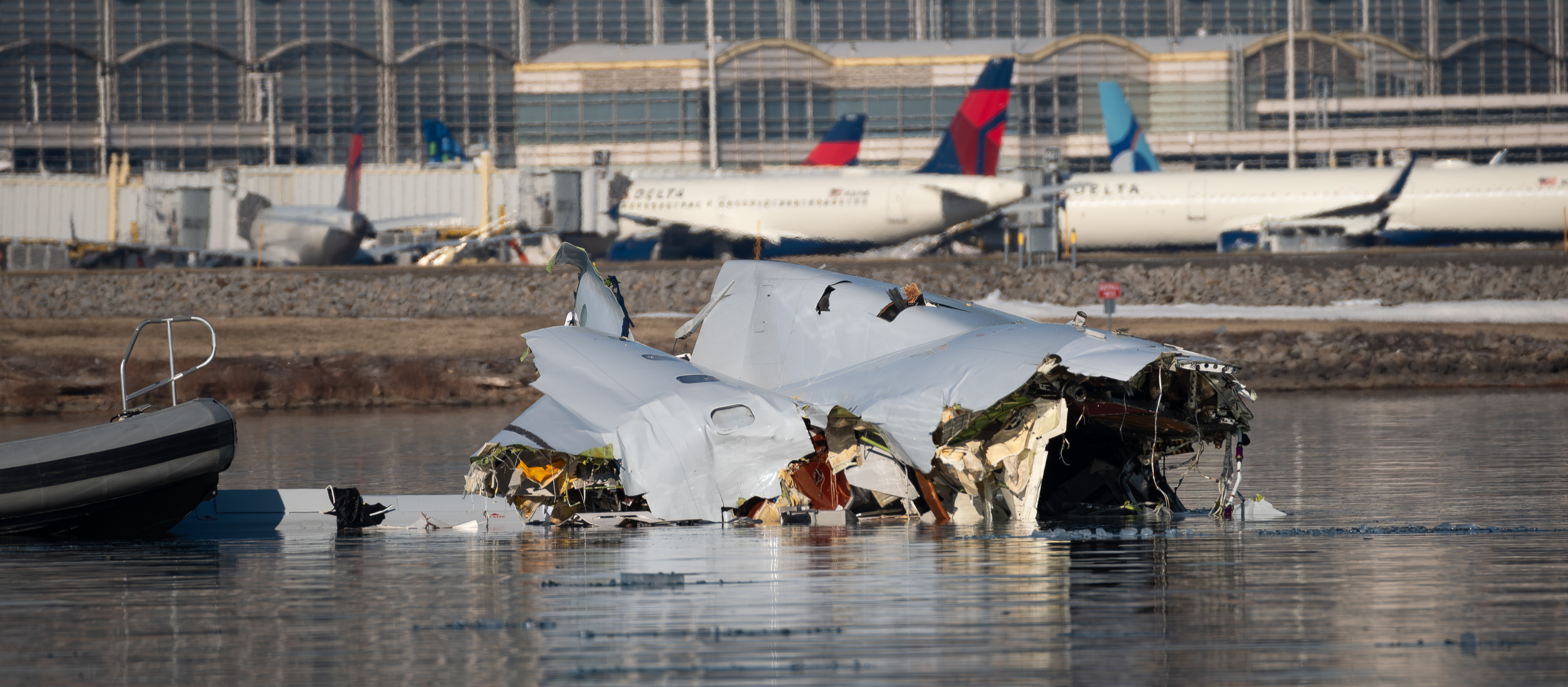
Recovery of the wreck of Bombardier CRJ700 involved in a mid-air collision over the Potomac River on January 29

- January 1
  - Poland takes over the Presidency of the Council of the European Union, after the Hungarian presidency.
  - Bulgaria and Romania completed the process of joining the Schengen Area, lifting land border controls.
  - Liechtenstein becomes the 37th country to legalize same-sex marriage.
  - Ukraine halts the transportation of many Russian gas supplies through the country following the expiration of a five-year transit deal, while also becoming a state party in the International Criminal Court.
  - Fifteen people (including the perpetrator) are killed and 57 others are injured during a vehicle-ramming and shooting attack in New Orleans, Louisiana, United States.
  - Thirteen people are killed and 3 more injured in a shooting in Cetinje, Montenegro.
- January 6 – Indonesia becomes the tenth member to join BRICS.
- January 7
  - A 7.1 magnitude earthquake strikes Tibet, China, killing at least 126 people, while another 338 are injured.
  - Greater Los Angeles experiences the most destructive wildfires in its history, fueled by strong winds and prolonged drought conditions. Over 13,000 structures are destroyed. At least 29 deaths are reported, while 180,000 people are evacuated, with fires continuing for days.
- January 8 – Eighteen gunmen and a soldier are killed in an attack on the presidential palace in N'Djamena, the capital of Chad.
- January 9 – The Commander of the Lebanese Armed Forces, Joseph Aoun, is elected the 14th president of Lebanon by parliament, ending the power vacuum that lasted over two years.
- January 10 – The European Copernicus Climate Change Service reports that 2024 was the world's hottest year on record, and the first calendar year to pass the symbolic threshold of 1.5 °C of global warming.
- January 11 – A gas station explosion in Al Bayda, Yemen, results in 40 deaths and dozens of others injured.
- January 12 – 2024–25 Croatian presidential election: Zoran Milanović is re-elected for a second term.
- January 13 – C/2024 G3 (ATLAS), a non-periodic comet, reaches perihelion, and is dubbed The Great Comet of 2025.
- January 14 – February 2 – The 2025 World Men's Handball Championship is held in Croatia, Denmark and Norway, and is won by Denmark.
- January 15
  - The President of South Korea, Yoon Suk Yeol, is successfully arrested after a second attempt by police following a martial law declaration and successful impeachment motion the previous December.
  - Gaza war: Israel and Hamas approve a ceasefire agreement that seeks to end the war, exchange Israeli hostages and Palestinian prisoners, and allow in international aid. It takes effect on January 19.
  - Colossal Biosciences and University of Melbourne create the world's first artificial womb in marsupials as part of their project toward de-extinction of the thylacine.
- January 16
  - Blue Origin successfully launches its heavy-lift launch vehicle, New Glenn, on its first attempt, though fails to land its first stage booster as intended.
  - The 2025 Vanuatuan general election is held.
  - The National Liberation Army (ELN) launches multiple attacks in the Catatumbo region, northeastern Colombia. Over 100 people are killed during the clashes.
- January 18
  - 98 people are killed in a fuel tanker explosion near Suleja, Niger State, Nigeria.
  - Two Sharia judges are assassinated in their rooms at the Supreme Court of Iran in capital Tehran. The gunman injures two other people and commits suicide after the attacks.
- January 19 – Gaza war: A ceasefire goes into effect, lasting until an Israeli surprise attack on 18 March.
- January 21 – 78 people are killed after a fire breaks out in a hotel at the Kartalkaya ski resort in Turkey.
- January 23
  - Micheál Martin is re-elected prime minister (Taoiseach) of Ireland by Dáil Éireann for a second non-consecutive term.
  - Thailand becomes the 38th country and the first in Southeastern Asia to legalize same-sex marriage.
- January 24
  - Storm Éowyn hits Ireland and the United Kingdom. Record high wind speeds of 183 km/h (114 mph) are recorded in Ireland, while over a million homes are left without power.
  - A series of ongoing boycotts in Southeastern European countries took place of several retail stores in that region, in response to raised food prices and alleged price fixing.
- January 25 – The Dacian-era Helmet of Coțofenești, on loan from the National History Museum of Romania, is stolen along with three other gold artifacts from the Drents Museum in Assen by thieves who broke into the museum using explosives.
- January 26 – The 2025 Belarusian presidential election is held, with incumbent Alexander Lukashenko (independent, but of the Belaya Rus alliance) being re-elected. Opposition leaders were not allowed to run and were either exiled or jailed by the regime.
- January 27 – Global technology shares outside China fall sharply in response to the release of DeepSeek's chatbot, a Chinese competitor to OpenAI's ChatGPT. Chip giant Nvidia loses almost $600 billion of its value, the biggest drop for a single company in U.S. stock market history.
- January 29
  - 2025 Potomac River mid-air collision: A United States Army Black Hawk helicopter with three occupants on board, collides with a Bombardier CRJ700 operated by PSA Airlines with 64 occupants on board in Washington, D.C., United States. There were no survivors.
  - Ahmed al-Sharaa is appointed as the president of Syria, after a one-month vacancy following the fall of the Assad regime.

=== February ===
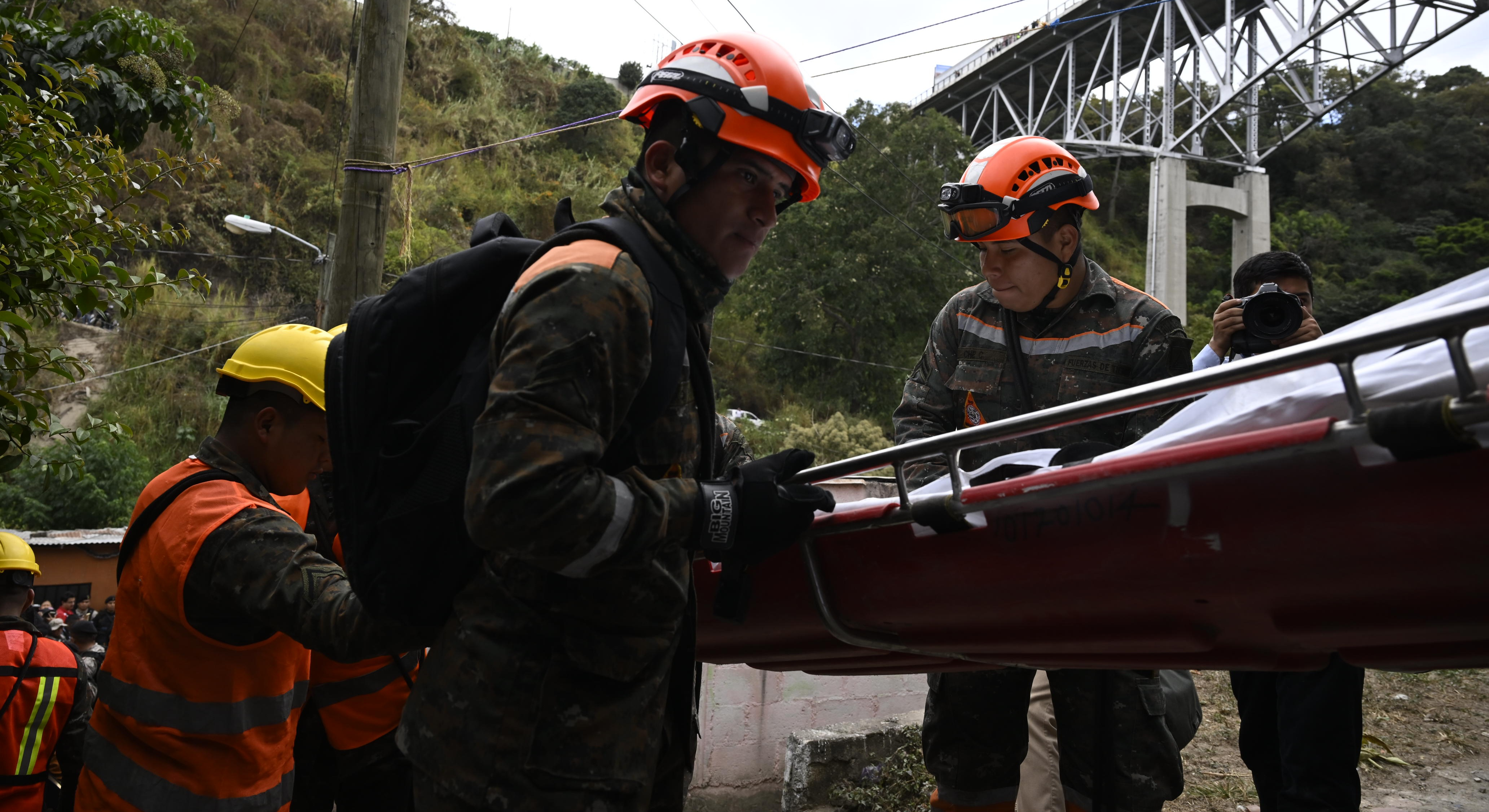
Members of the Guatemalan Army and National Civil Police participating in the search-and-rescue efforts following the Guatemala City bus crash on February 10

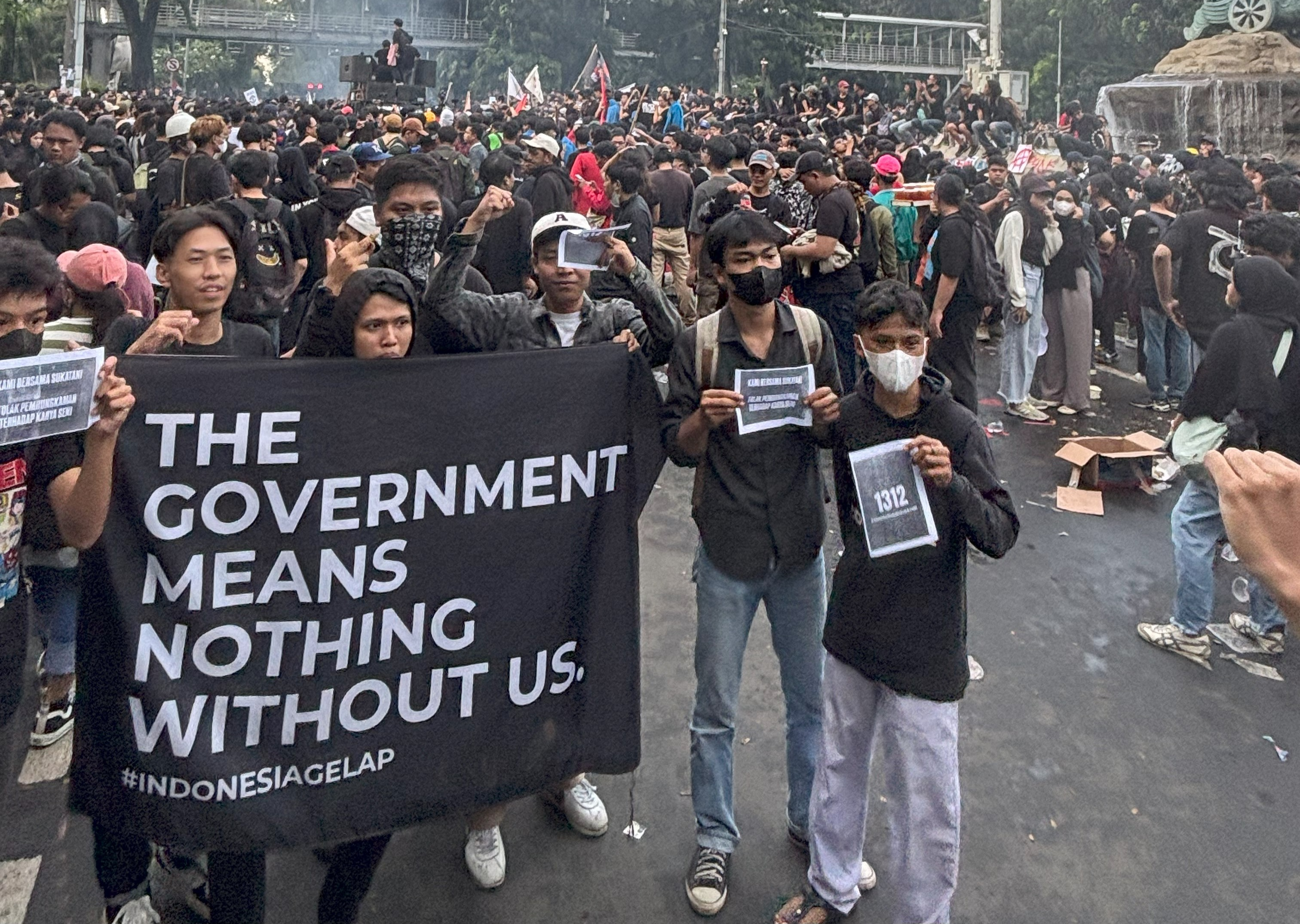
Student–led anti-government protests erupt across Indonesia on February 17 following the enactment of a legislation increasing military involvement in civilian government roles

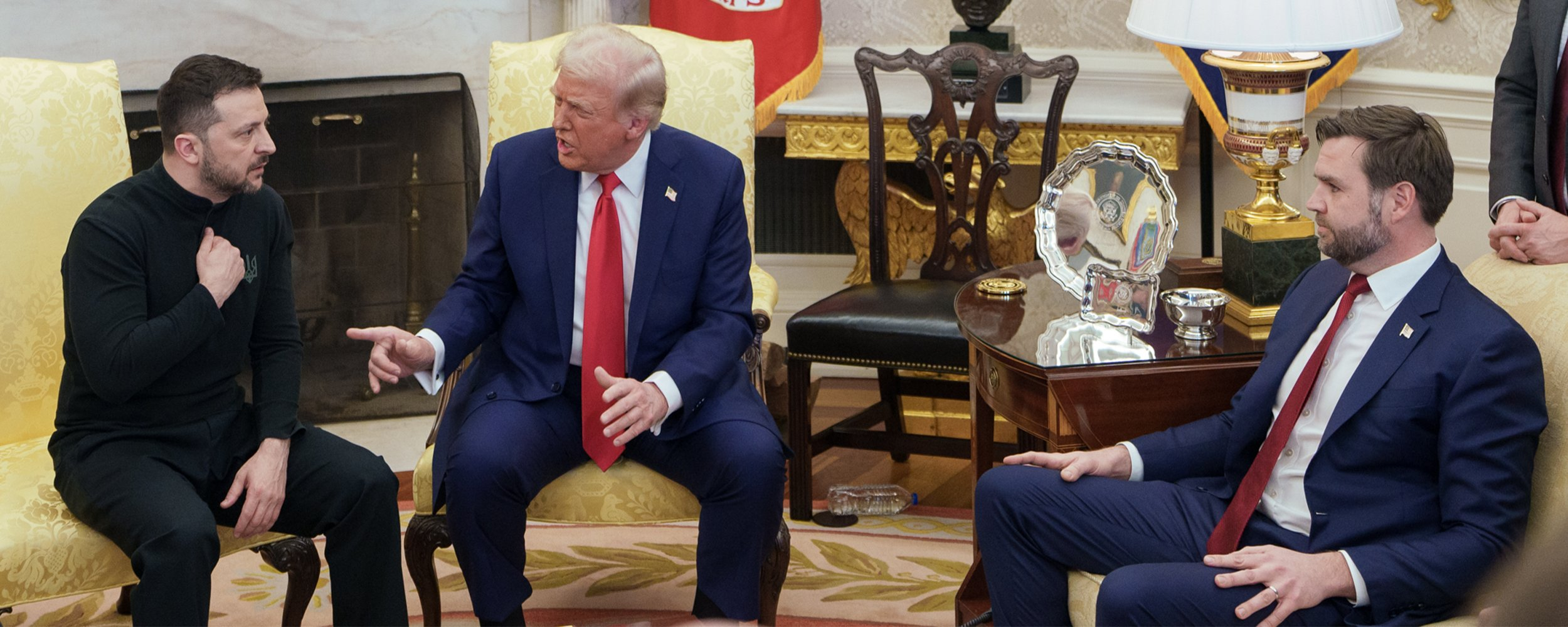
The meeting between Volodymyr Zelenskyy, Donald Trump, and JD Vance in the Oval Office on February 28, where Trump and Vance argue with Zelenskyy, increasing diplomatic tensions between their countries

- February 4
  - China–United States trade war: China announces export controls and increased tariffs on certain American imports in retaliation for Donald Trump's imposition of tariffs on Chinese goods.
  - At least 11 people (and the perpetrator) are killed and another 15 are injured after a gunman opens fire at an adult education centre in Örebro, Sweden, the deadliest mass shooting in the country's history.
  - Donald Trump announces that the United States will take control of the Gaza Strip in an agreement with Israel, and that the U.S. military will be in charge of Gaza's reconstruction.
- February 9
  - The Baltic states complete synchronization of their power grids with continental Europe's grid, disconnecting from Russia's grid.
  - 2025 Liechtenstein general election: The Patriotic Union, led by Brigitte Haas, retains its plurality of 10 seats in the Landtag.
- February 10 – A bus falls off a bridge over the Las Vacas River in Guatemala City, Guatemala, killing at least 55 people, and seriously injuring 9 others.
- February 12
  - Konstantinos Tasoulas is elected President of Greece by the Hellenic Parliament after four rounds in the 2025 Greek presidential election.
  - Klaus Iohannis resigns as President of Romania, making him the first Romanian president to do so post-revolution.
  - The Armenian parliament unanimously approves a bill to initiate Armenia's accession process to the European Union. The Armenian government states that the decision to pass the bill marks the first step in "the beginning of Armenia's accession process to the European Union".
- February 15 – Mahamoud Ali Youssouf is elected as the chairperson of the African Union Commission.
- February 17 – 2025 Indonesian protests: A series of ongoing nationwide protests are held following the enactment of a legislation increasing military involvement in civilian government roles.
- February 18
  - Following a constitutional reform, Nicaragua becomes a diarchy with spouses Daniel Ortega and Rosario Murillo as co-presidents.
  - Vladimir Putin announces that Russia and the United States have officially agreed to restore diplomatic relations. A four-hour summit between the US and Russia is held in Saudi Arabia.
  - Egypt announces the discovery of Thutmose II's tomb by a joint British-Egyptian team, the first royal tomb to be discovered since Tutankhamun's in 1922. It is the 15th and final pharaoh tomb from the Eighteenth Dynasty of Egypt to have been found by archeologists. (Note: The tomb was discovered in 2022, but the official announcement was made in February 2025.)
- February 19 – Croatia completes the process of joining the European Economic Area.
- February 23 – 2025 German federal election: After being pushed forward as a result of the 2024 German government crisis, the centre-right CDU/CSU becomes the largest party, with big gains from the far-right AfD, resulting in a second-place finish.
- February 25 – An Antonov An-26 of the Sudanese Air Force crashes in a residential area, near the Wadi Seidna Air Base. All 17 occupants onboard and 29 people on the ground died.
- February 27 – The Kurdistan Workers' Party (PKK) leader Abdullah Öcalan, made the call for the dissolution of the organization and the laying down of arms from İmralı Prison. The PKK, in turn, declared a ceasefire on 1 March 2025.
- February 28 – A meeting between U.S. president Donald Trump and Ukrainian president Volodymyr Zelenskyy takes place at the White House. Trump and V.P. JD Vance sharply criticise Zelenskyy, raising questions about support for Ukraine, a proposed end to the war, and the country's future in general.

=== March ===
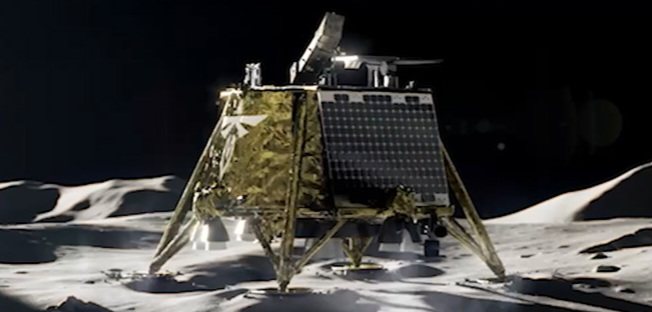
A rendering of Blue Ghost Mission 1 which landed on March 2

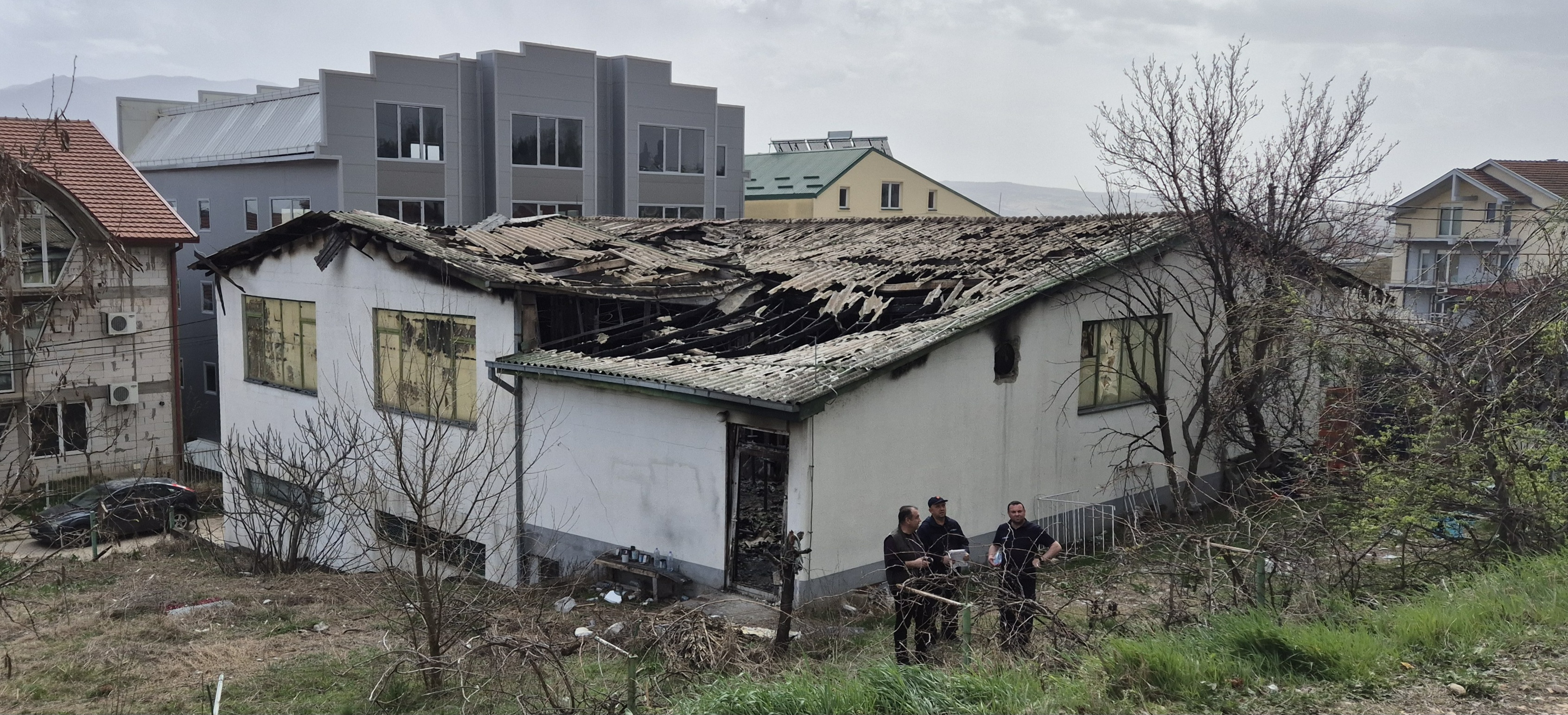
Remains of the Pulse nightclub in Kočani, North Macedonia, where a fire took place on March 16, killing 63 people and injuring 193 others

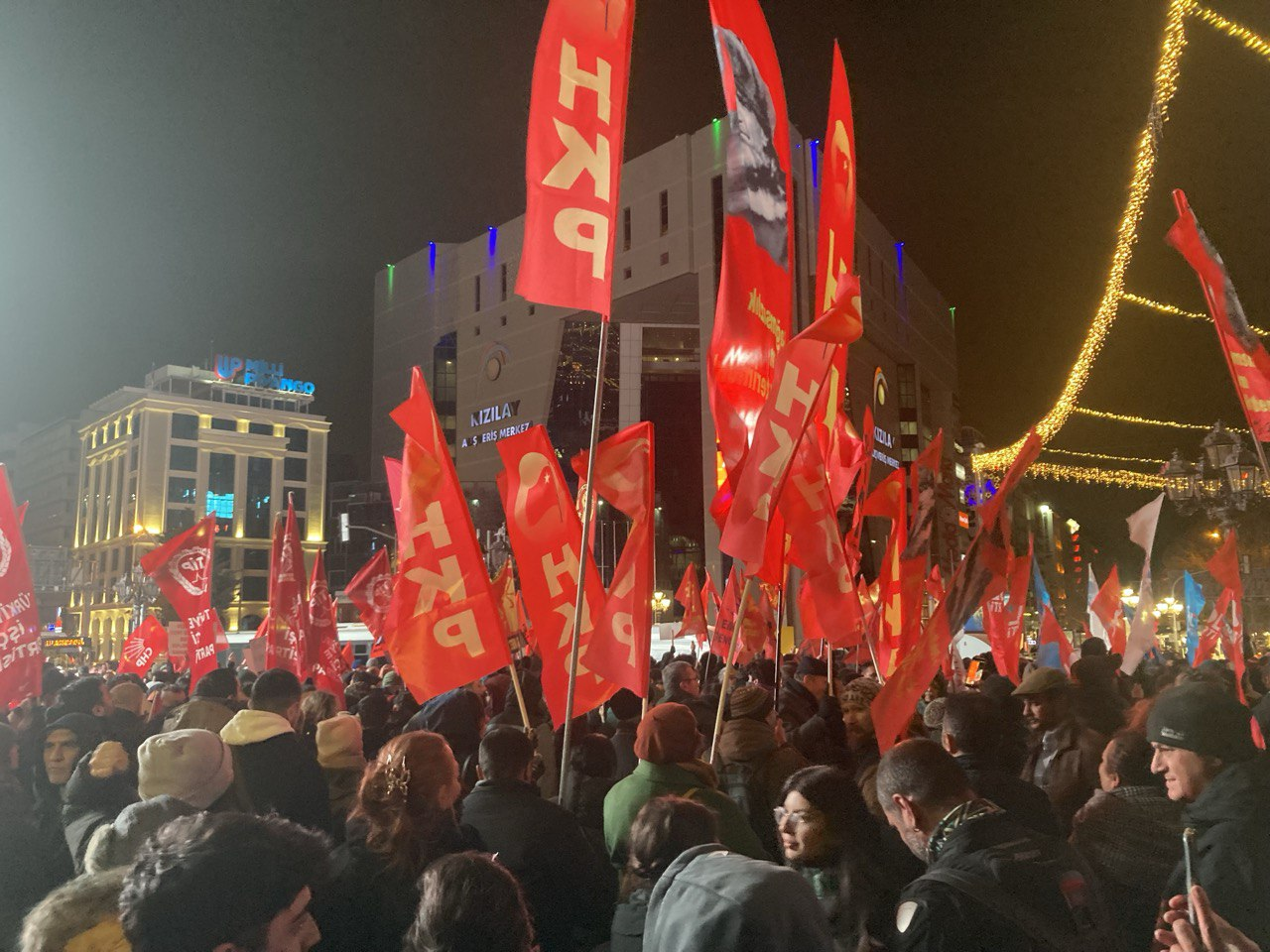
Anti-government protests break out across Turkey following the arrest of Istanbul mayor Ekrem İmamoğlu by the national police on March 19

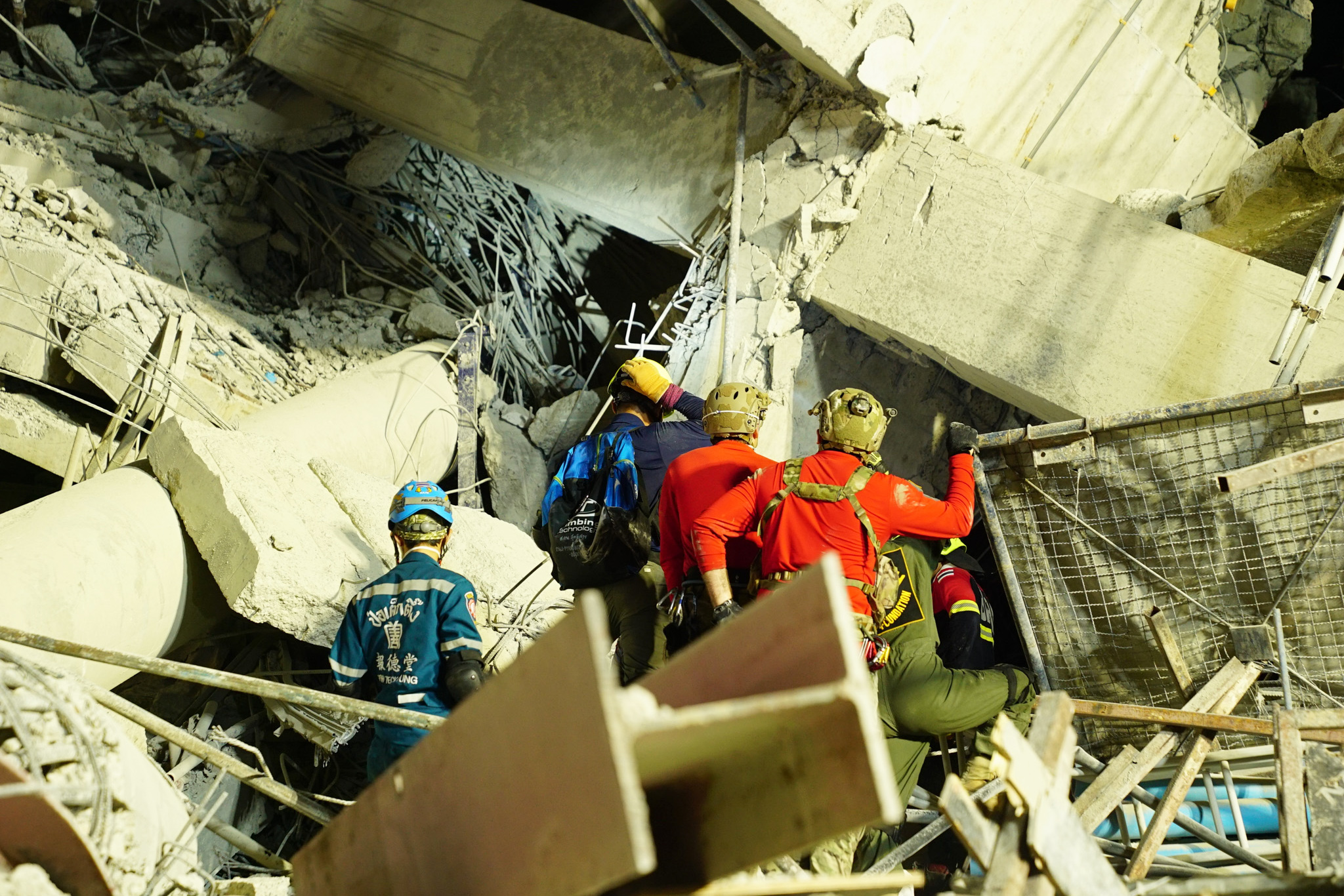
Rescue efforts at the collapsed building in Thailand caused by the Myanmar earthquake on March 28

- March 2 – Firefly Aerospace becomes the first commercial company to successfully land on the Moon with no technical issues, with its Blue Ghost Mission 1.
- March 3 – The Trump administration pauses military aid to Ukraine, following the Oval Office meeting with Zelenskyy the previous week.
- March 4 – Colossal Biosciences creates woolly mice as part of de-extinction efforts for the woolly mammoth. (Note: The mice were born in October 2024, but they were not disclosed to the public until March 2025.)
- March 5 – Sudan files an application against the United Arab Emirates before the International Court of Justice, alleging violations of the Convention on the Prevention and Punishment of the Crime of Genocide by the UAE through its support for the RSF, which is responsible for the genocide in Darfur.
- March 8 – More than 1,000 people, including civilians, are reported killed in a crackdown by Syrian transitional government security forces in the Alawite region, described as the country's worst violence for years.
- March 8–17 – The 2025 Special Olympics World Winter Games are held in Turin, Italy.
- March 11
  - The former President of the Philippines, Rodrigo Duterte, is arrested in the Philippines after being served an arrest warrant from the International Criminal Court for crimes against humanity.
  - Balochistan Liberation Army militants blow up railway tracks and hijack the Jaffar Express train bound from Quetta to Peshawar, taking 450 people hostages including both security personnel and civilians.
  - 2025 Greenlandic general election: The center-right Democrats become the largest party, defeating the incumbent Inuit Ataqatigiit.
- March 12 – 2025 Belizean general election: The incumbent People's United Party wins a second term in a landslide victory.
- March 16
  - A fire breaks out in a nightclub in Kočani, North Macedonia, killing at least 59 people and injuring 155 others.
  - Keith Rowley resigns as Prime Minister of Trinidad and Tobago after nine years in office, and is succeeded by Stuart Young.
- March 18
  - Israel launches widespread aerial bombardments and attacks on the Gaza Strip, killing at least 591 people, including children, ending the ceasefire agreement reached in January.
  - The President of Somalia, Hassan Sheikh Mohamud, survives an attack on his convoy by al-Shabaab, killing at least 10 people.
- March 19 – Nationwide protests erupt across Turkey following the arrest of the mayor of Istanbul, Ekrem İmamoğlu, on charges of corruption and terrorism.
- March 20 – Kirsty Coventry is elected as the 10th, first female and first African President of the International Olympic Committee in the first round of voting in the 144th IOC Session.
- March 21
  - A major power outage causes Heathrow Airport in London to completely shut down, with disruption expected to last for days, affecting thousands of flights around the world.
  - South Korea experiences one of its worst wildfires in modern history; over 87 000 hectares of land are destroyed in South Gyeongsang Province, killing at least 32 people.
- March 28 – A 7.7-magnitude earthquake occurs in Myanmar, resulting in 5,413 killed and 11,402 injured.
- March 31 – The Caribbean guilder is introduced, replacing the Netherlands Antillean guilder as the currency for Curaçao and Sint Maarten.

=== April ===
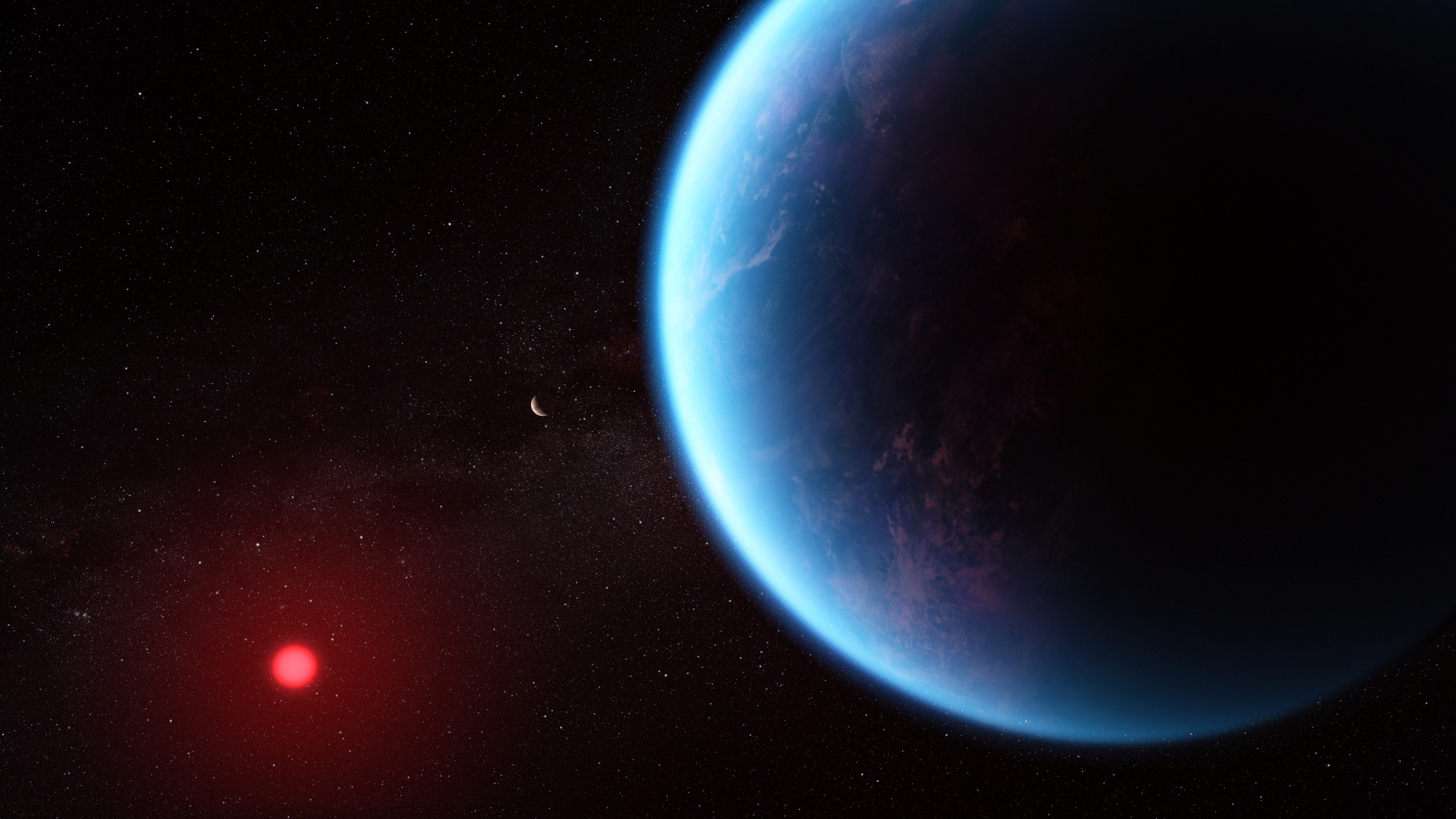
Possible biosignatures are discovered in the atmosphere of exoplanet K2-18b (artistic impression of planet)

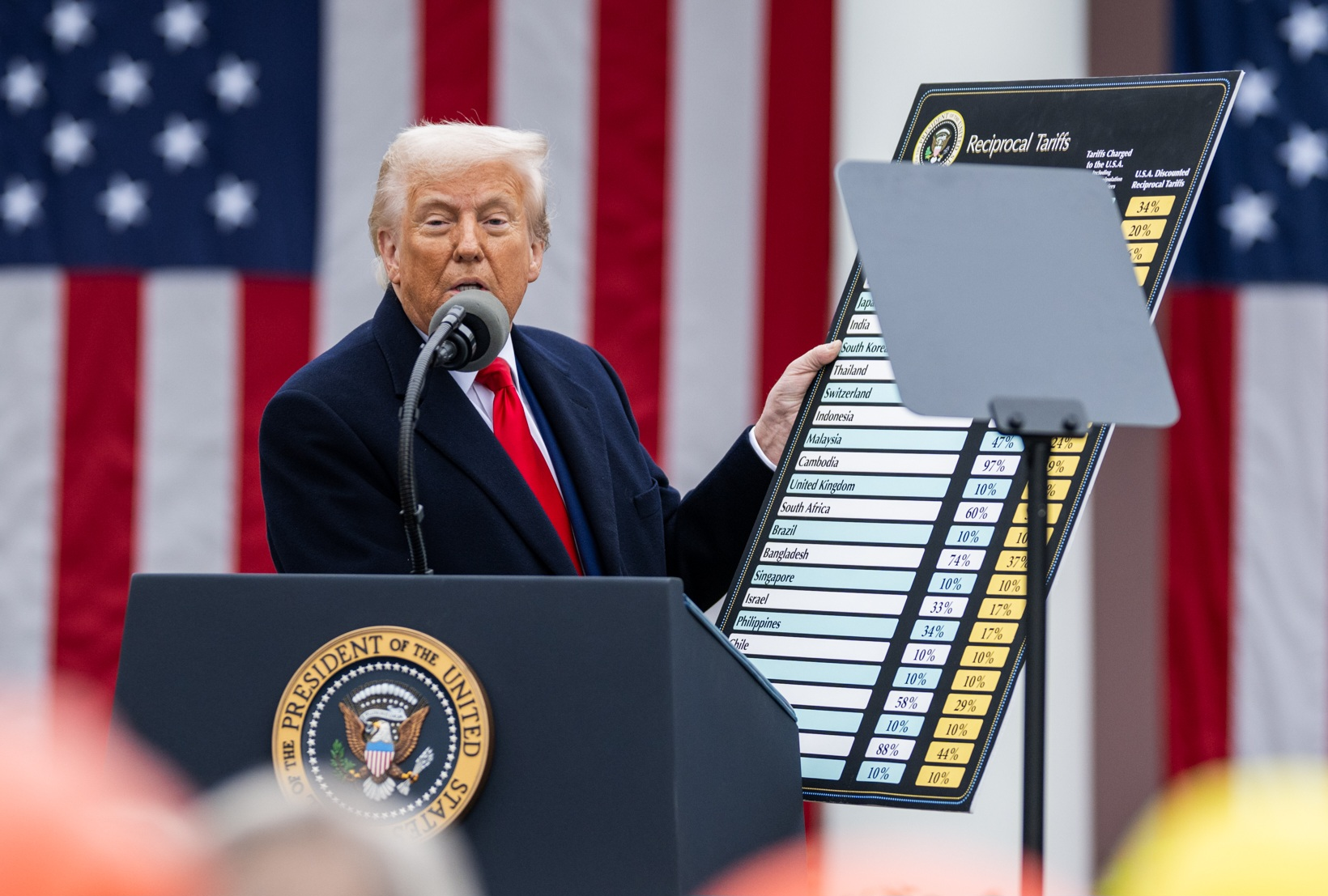
U.S President Donald Trump holding the chart detailing tariffs levied against the United States on his Liberation Day speech on April 2

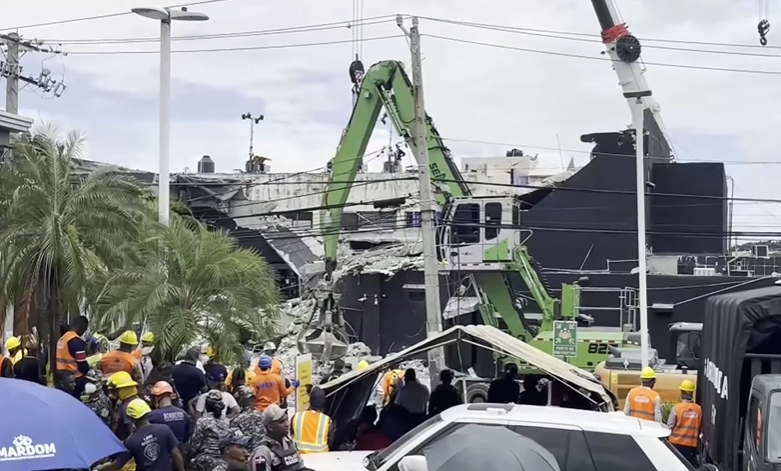
Rescue of victims following the Jet Set nightclub roof collapse on April 8

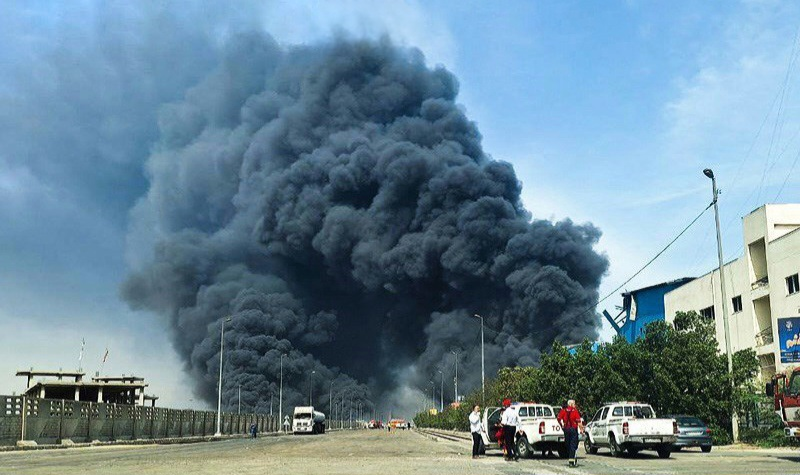
Smoke billowing after the Port of Shahid Rajaee explosion on April 26

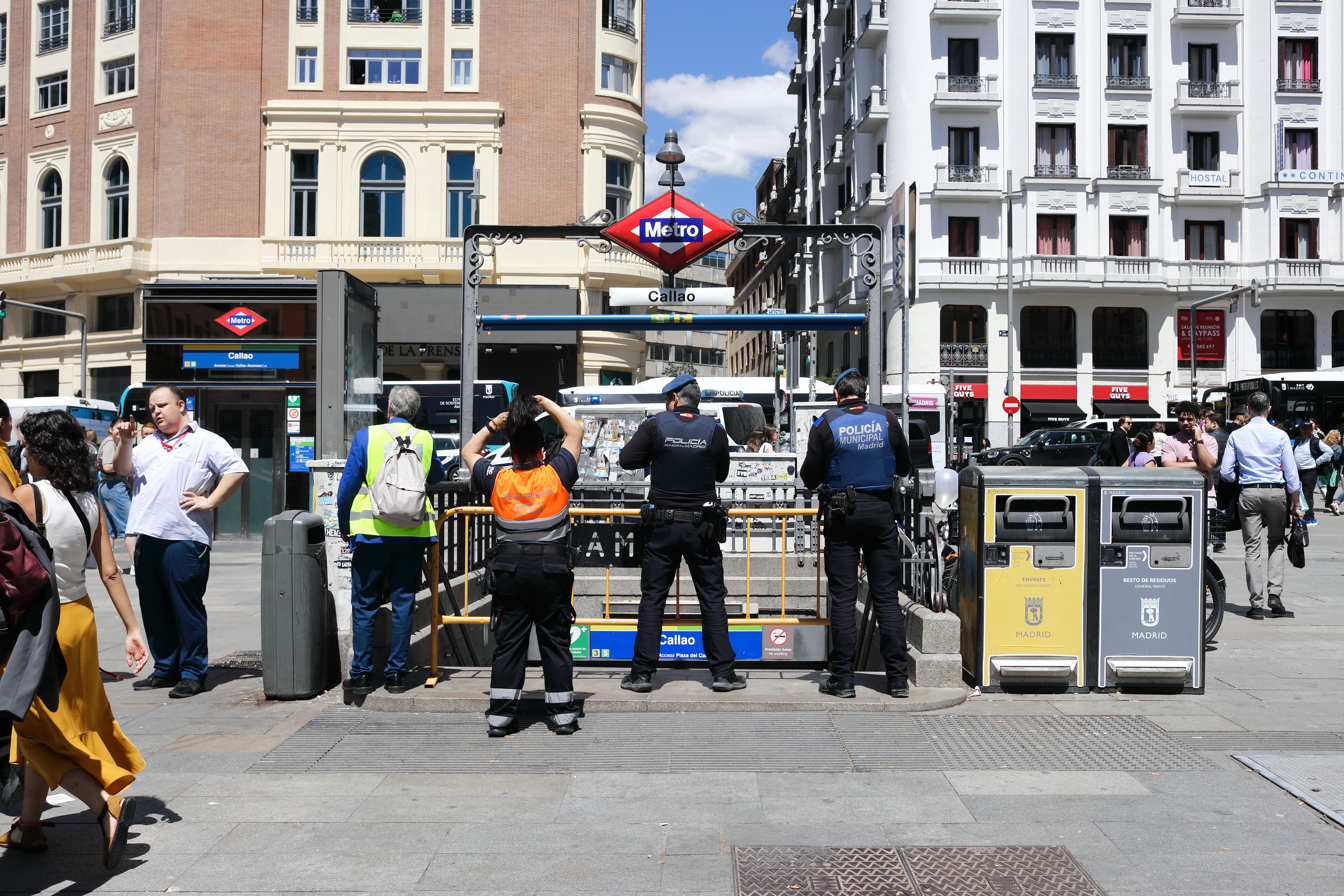
Metro station closed in Madrid during the Iberian Peninsula blackout on April 28

- April 1 – Fram2 launches aboard a SpaceX Falcon 9 rocket, becoming the first crewed spaceflight to enter a polar retrograde orbit.
- April 2 – US President Donald Trump issues sweeping trade tariffs on many countries, including a 10% baseline tariff for all imports.
- April 3 – Hungary withdraws from the International Criminal Court after Israeli Prime Minister and accused war criminal Benjamin Netanyahu lands in Budapest for a state visit, in defiance of the International Criminal Court's arrest warrant against him.
- April 4 – Impeachment of Yoon Suk Yeol: The Constitutional Court of Korea unanimously upholds Yoon's impeachment in an 8–0 vote, officially removing him from office.
- April 7 – Colossal Biosciences showcases three grey wolves that are genetically modified to exhibit the characteristics of the dire wolf.
- April 8 – During a concert performance by Rubby Pérez in Santo Domingo, a nightclub roof collapses, killing at least 231 people, including Pérez, and injures more than 200 others.
- April 12 – 2025 Gabonese presidential election: Incumbent transitional President Brice Oligui Nguema wins a full term. The election is the first since the 2023 Gabonese coup d'état, and was preceded by a constitutional referendum in 2024.
- April 13 – October 13 – Expo 2025 is held in Osaka, Japan.
- April 13 – 2025 Ecuadorian general election: Incumbent president Daniel Noboa is re-elected for a full term in the second round.
- April 15 – A motorized wooden boat capsizes after catching fire in the Congo River near the town of Mbandaka in the Democratic Republic of the Congo, killing at least 148 people.
- April 17 – The atmosphere of K2-18b, a candidate water world located 124 light-years away, is found to contain large quantities of dimethyl sulfide and/or dimethyl disulfide – two compounds that, on Earth, are only known to be produced by life.
- April 21 – Pope Francis, head of the Catholic Church since 2013, dies at the age of 88. World leaders pay tribute. Many countries declare national mourning.
- April 22 – Pakistan backed attackers affiliated with The Resistance Front open fire on a group of tourists after asking their religion at the Baisaran Valley in Jammu and Kashmir, India, killing 26 and injuring at least 20.
- April 26
  - The funeral of Pope Francis is attended by delegations from 164 countries, including 82 leaders, and 250,000 members of the public.
  - An explosion in the Port of Shahid Rajaee, Bandar Abbas, Iran, kills at least 70 people and injures more than 1,000.
  - At least 11 people are killed and at least 32 others are injured in a vehicle-ramming attack at the annual Lapu Lapu Day festival in Vancouver, British Columbia, Canada.
- April 28
  - 2025 Canadian federal election: Following Justin Trudeau's resignation as prime minister in March, former governor of the Bank of Canada Mark Carney becomes the Prime Minister of Canada. The Liberal Party wins a fourth consecutive election and forms a minority government.
  - A widespread power outage affects Spain and Portugal for hours. Andorra is affected for a few seconds while southern France is lightly affected.
  - 2025 Trinidad and Tobago general election: The UNC wins a majority government, defeating the incumbent PNM.
- April 30 – The Ukraine–United States Mineral Resources Agreement is signed, providing an economic incentive for the US to continue to invest in Ukraine's defence and reconstruction, in exchange for access to the war-torn country's energy and mineral resources.

=== May ===
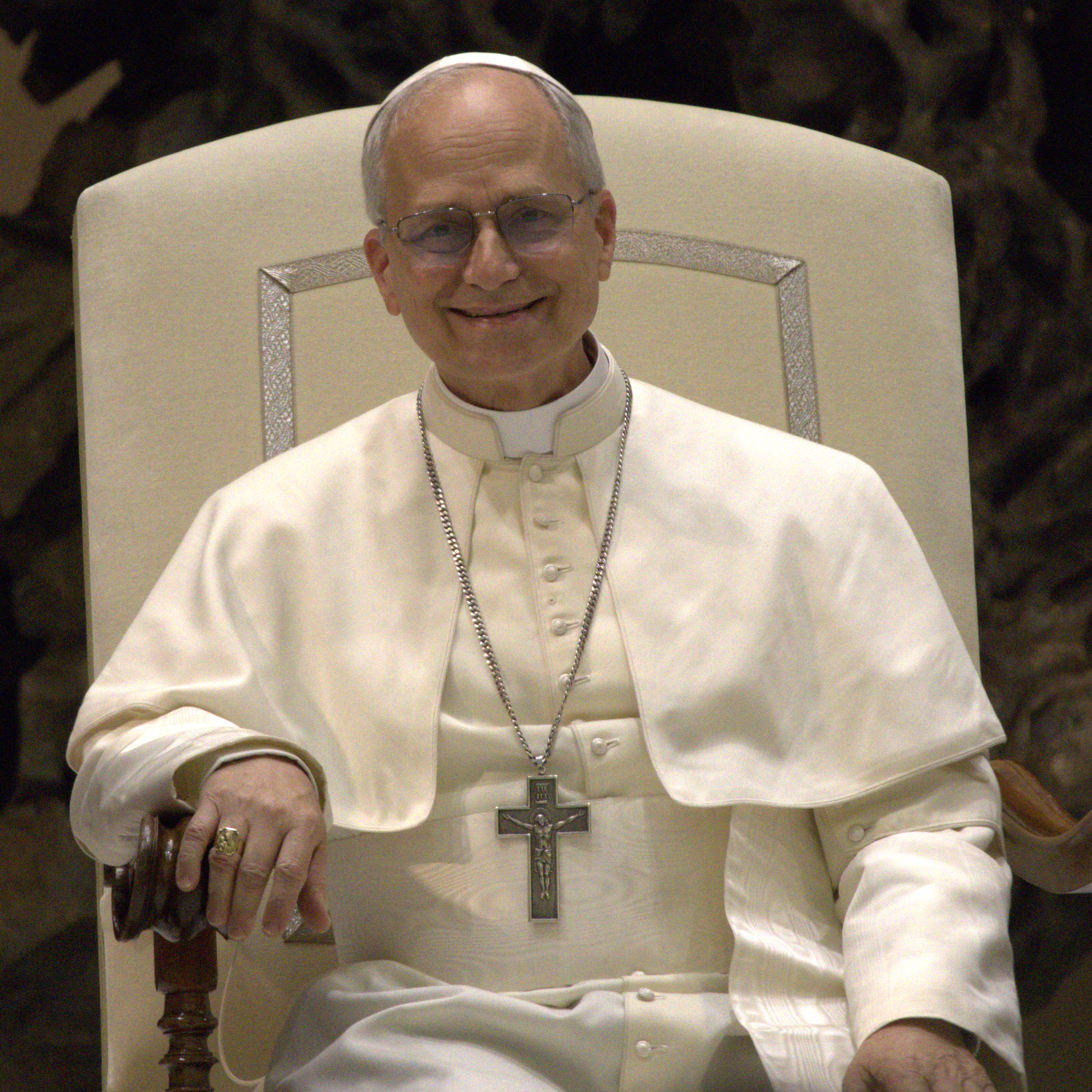
Robert Francis Prevost is elected as Pope Leo XIV in the papal conclave on May 8, becoming the first American citizen, Peruvian citizen, North American and Augustinian pope in the history of the Catholic Church

- May 3
  - 2025 Australian federal election: The incumbent Labor Party led by Anthony Albanese wins reelection, increasing their majority.
  - 2025 Singaporean general election: The incumbent People's Action Party led by Lawrence Wong wins reelection in a landslide, retaining a supermajority government.
  - 2025 Malian protests: Hundreds of demonstrators gather in Bamako, Mali, to protest the government's proposed dissolution of political parties and extension of president Assimi Goïta's mandate by 5 years. The protests mark the first pro-democracy demonstrations in the country since the regime took power in 2021.
- May 6 – 2025 German federal election: Friedrich Merz is elected Chancellor of Germany in the second round of parliamentary voting, hours after being defeated in the first round, a first in post-WWII German history.
- May 7 – 2025 India–Pakistan conflict: India launches several missiles into Pakistani territory in response to the 2025 Pahalgam attack two weeks prior.
- May 7–8 – 2025 conclave: 133 cardinal electors select Robert Francis Prevost as Pope Francis's successor, on the fourth ballot. He takes the name Leo XIV, and becomes the first pope from North America, the first with Peruvian or U.S. citizenship, and the first from the Order of Saint Augustine.
- May 9–25 – The 2025 IIHF World Championship is held in Stockholm, Sweden, and Herning, Denmark, and is won by the United States.
- May 11 – 2025 Albanian parliamentary election: The incumbent Socialist Party led by Edi Rama wins reelection, retaining a majority government.
- May 12
  - 2025 Philippine general election: The ruling Alyansa para sa Bagong Pilipinas alliance win a narrow majority of the seats in the Senate, while one of its component parties Lakas–CMD wins the plurality of seats in the House of Representatives.
  - The Kurdistan Workers' Party announces its dissolution after previously declaring a ceasefire with Turkey.
- May 13–17 – The Eurovision Song Contest 2025 is held in Basel, Switzerland. Austrian contestant JJ wins with the song "Wasted Love".
- May 18
  - 2025 Portuguese legislative election: The incumbent Social Democratic Party led by Luís Montenegro wins an increased plurality, but fails to achieve a majority.
  - 2025 Romanian presidential election: Following the annulment of the previous election, Bucharest mayor Nicușor Dan wins in the second round, beating George Simion.
- May 25
  - The 2025 Surinamese general election is held.
  - The 2025 Venezuelan parliamentary election is held.
- May 28 – 2025 Nigeria floods: More than 500 people are killed, and hundreds more missing after flooding in Mokwa.
- May 31 – Josep-Lluís Serrano Pentinat is sworn in as the new Episcopal Co-Prince of Andorra and Bishop of Urgell after the Vatican accepts the resignation of Joan Enric Vives i Sicília for age limitation reasons.

=== June ===
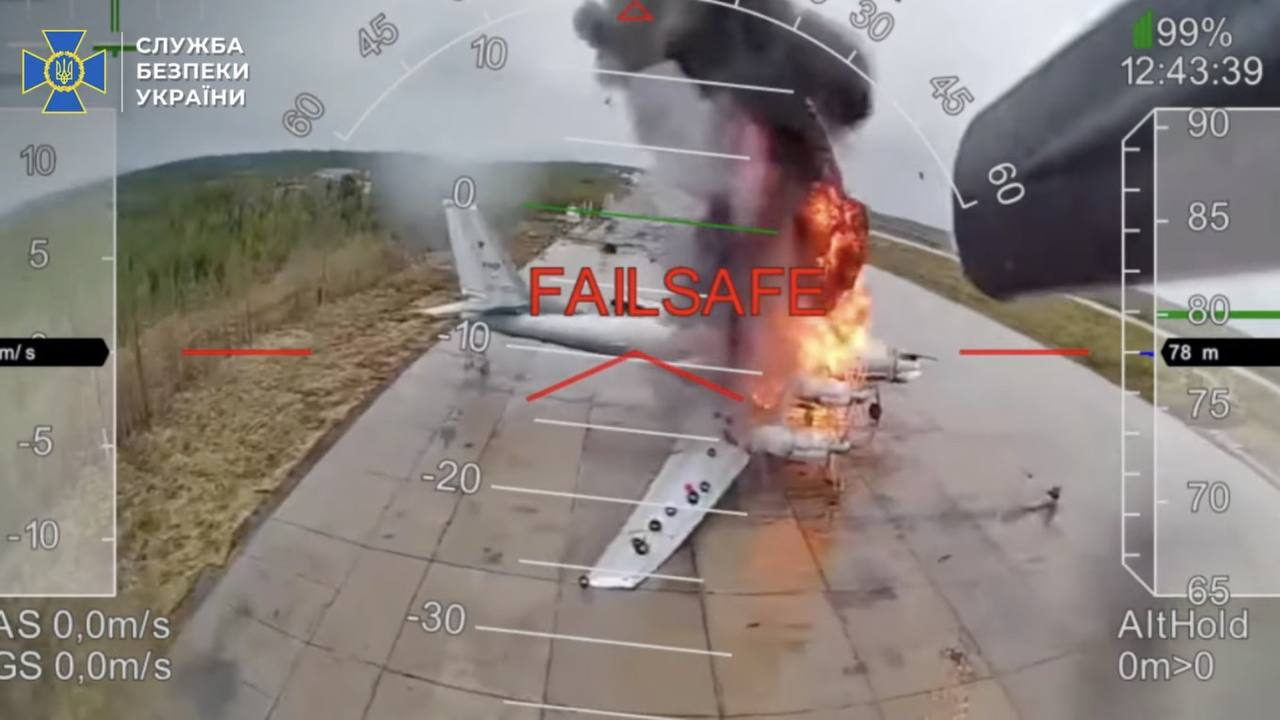
A Tu-95 on fire at the Olenya airbase after being struck by drones on June 1

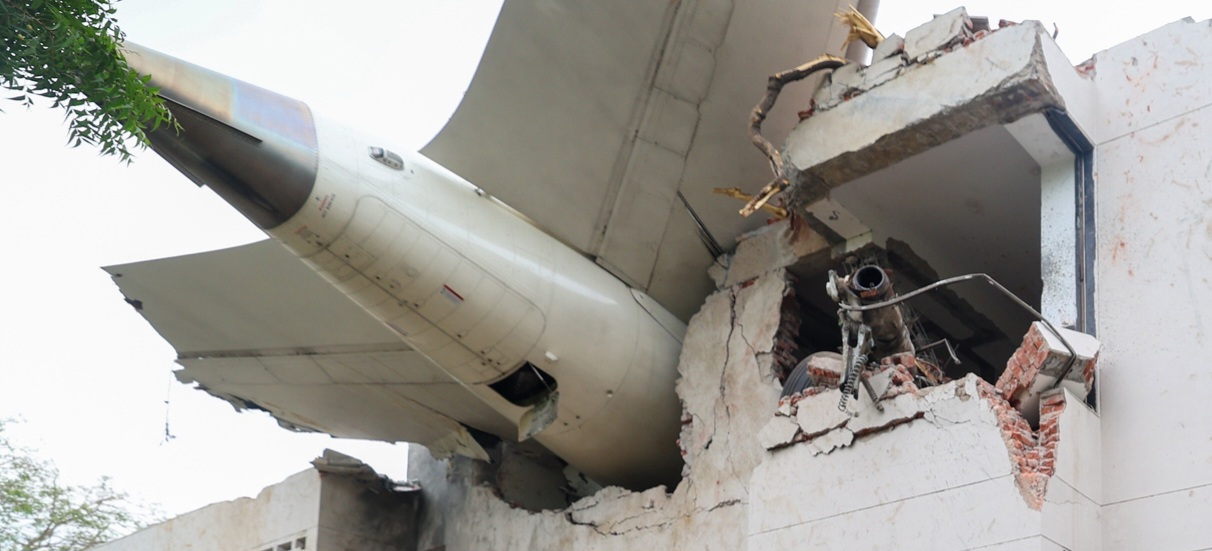
The wreckage of Air India Flight 171's tail section wedged into the B. J. Medical College, Ahmedabad on June 13

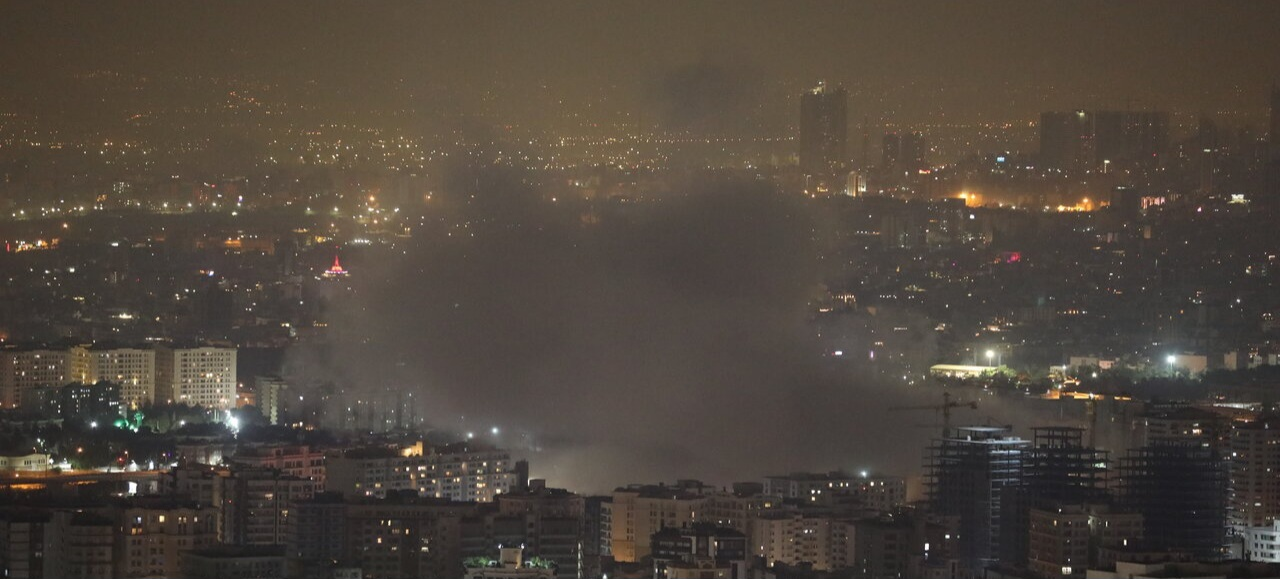
Explosions in Tehran during the Israeli strikes on Iran on June 13

- June 1
  - 2025 Polish presidential election: Karol Nawrocki is narrowly elected President of Poland in the second round of voting, beating Rafał Trzaskowski.
  - Operation Spiderweb: Ukraine launches a large drone attack on Russian military bases. More than 40 aircraft of the Russian Air Force are attacked.
- June 3
  - 2025 South Korean presidential election: After being pushed forward as a result of the impeachment of Yoon Suk Yeol, Lee Jae Myung wins the election, beating Kim Moon-soo.
  - 2025 Mongolian protests: Luvsannamsrain Oyun-Erdene resigns as Prime Minister of Mongolia after losing a no-confidence vote in the State Great Khural.
- June 10 – 10 people are killed and more than 30 others injured after a gunman opens fire at a school in Graz, Austria.
- June 12 – Air India Flight 171, a London-bound Boeing 787, crashes into a building after take-off from Ahmedabad, India, killing 229 passengers, 12 crew on board, and 19 people on the ground. One passenger survives the crash. It is the first fatal crash and hull loss involving a Boeing 787 Dreamliner.
- June 13 – Twelve-Day War: Israel conducts air strikes against Iran's nuclear facilities, killing military commanders including Hossein Salami; Iran retaliates.
- June 14 – July 13 – The 2025 FIFA Club World Cup is held in the United States, and is won by Chelsea.
- June 14 – The No Kings protests occur across many cities in the U.S., as well as Canada, Europe, Japan and Mexico, against Donald Trump.
- June 16–17 – The 51st G7 summit is held in Kananaskis, Canada.
- June 20 – An EF5 tornado strikes southeast of Enderlin, North Dakota, becoming the first EF5 tornado globally since May 20, 2013.
- June 21 – Belarusian opposition leader Sergei Tikhanovsky and 13 other political prisoners are released from prison and deported to Lithuania following a pardon as a result of negotiations with Trump's envoy in Minsk.
- June 22 – Twelve-Day War: The United States carries out B-2 bomber airstrikes on three Iranian nuclear sites in Fordow, Natanz, and Isfahan.
- June 23 – Iran launches missiles at Al Udeid Air Base in Qatar in response to the previous day's U.S. strikes.
- June 24–25 – A NATO summit is held at the World Forum in The Hague, Netherlands.
- June 25 – The Axiom Mission 4 is launched. The mission involves four astronauts, including the first astronauts from Poland (Sławosz Uznański-Wiśniewski) and India (Shubhanshu Shukla) since the end of the Cold War.
- June 27 – The U.S., with Qatari support, brokers a preliminary peace treaty between the Democratic Republic of the Congo and Rwanda, ending their armed conflict that started in 2022.

=== July ===
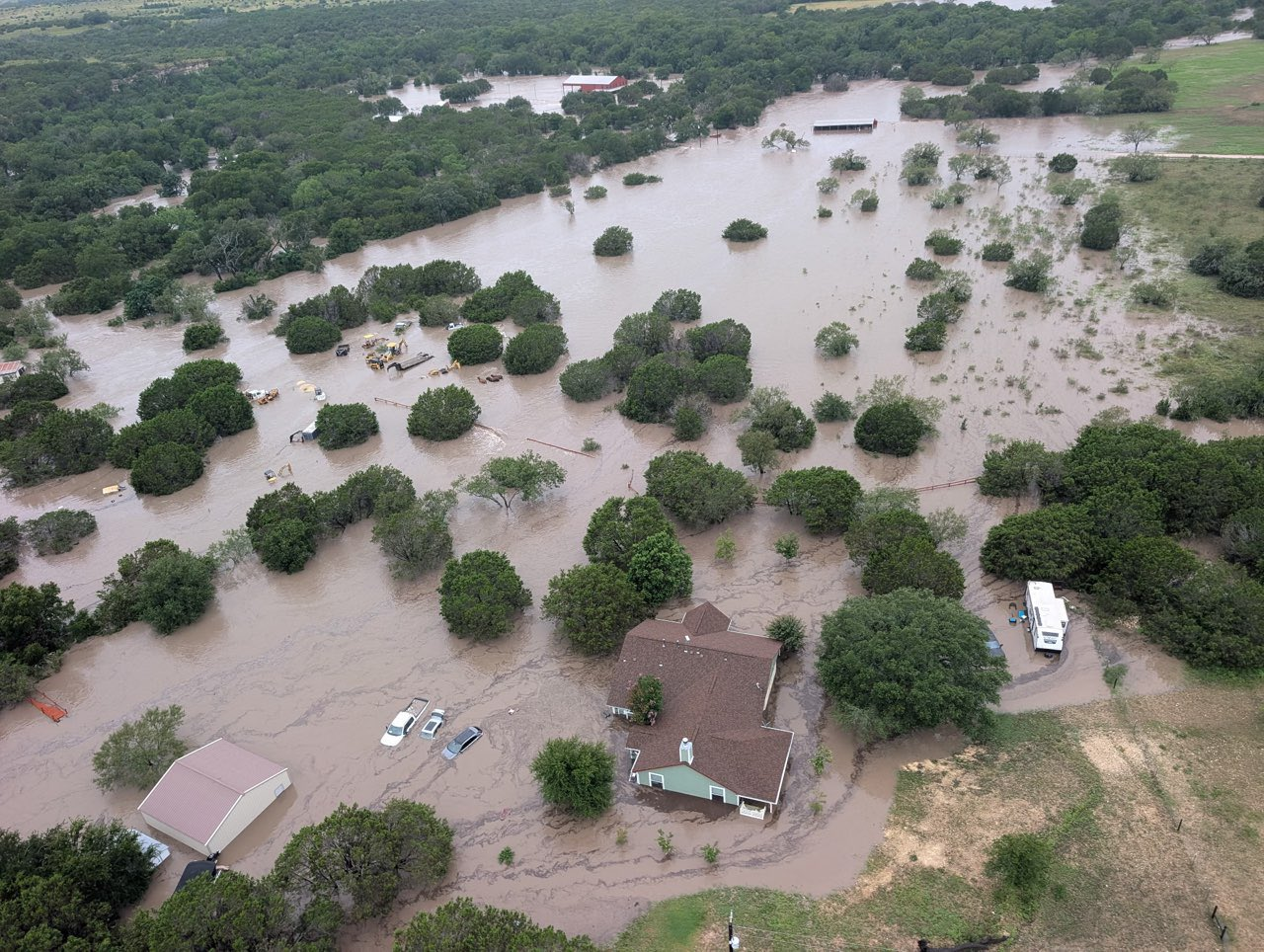
Aerial photo of the Central Texas floods near Hunt on July 5

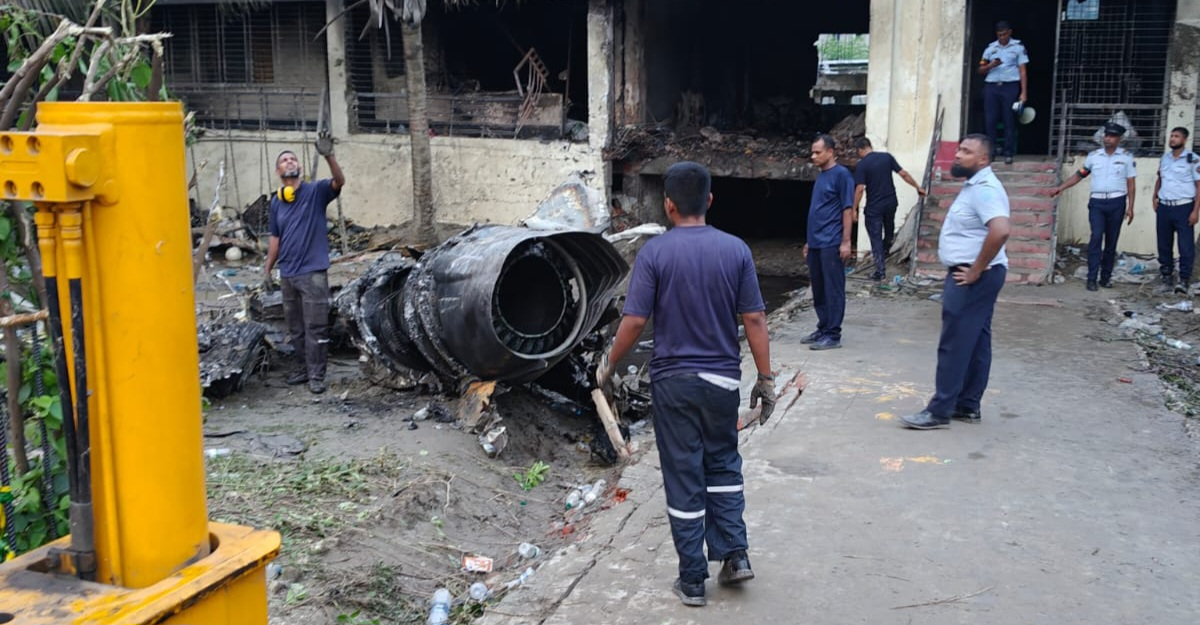
A fighter jet of Bangladesh Air Force crashed at Milestone School on July 22

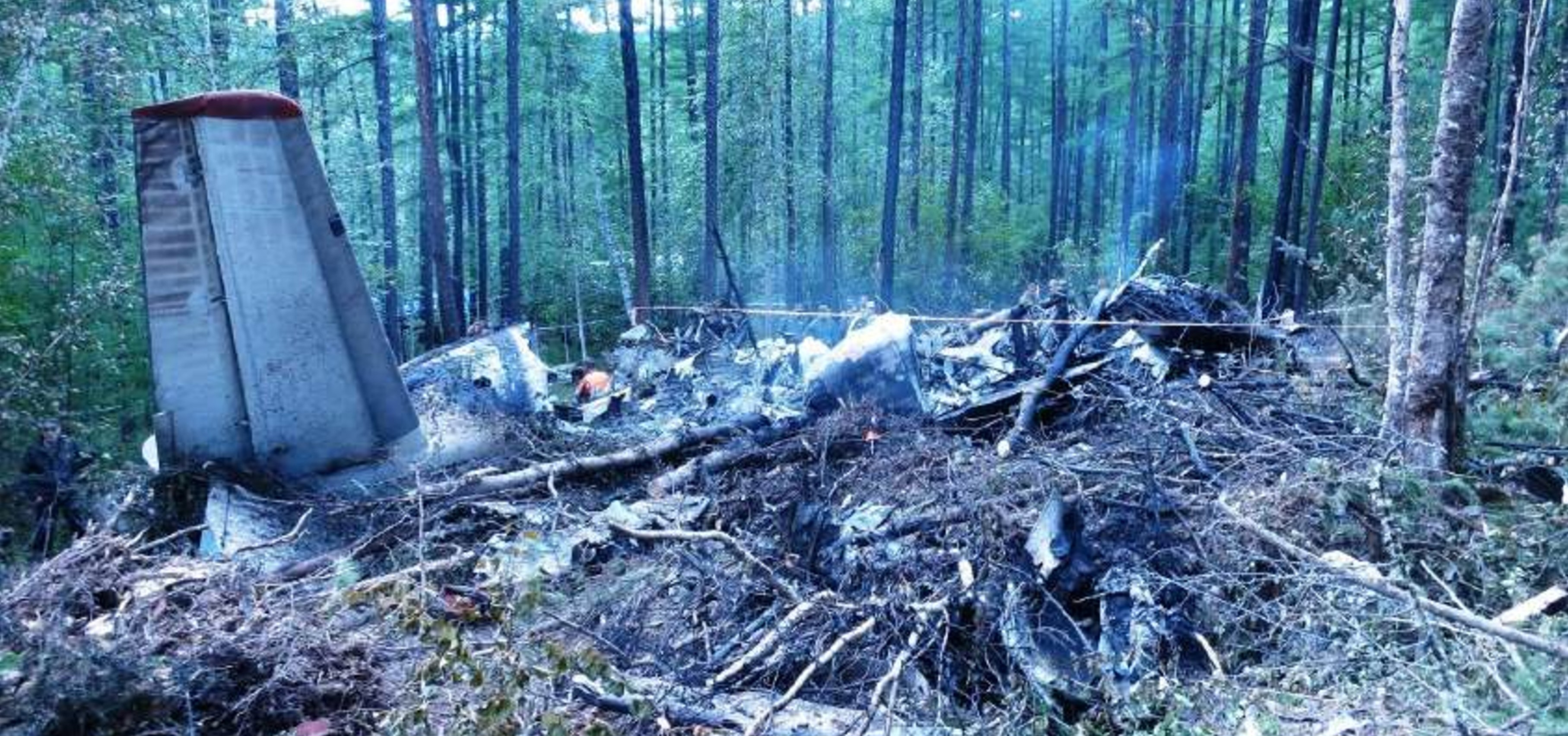
The wreckage of Angara Airlines Flight 2311 near the Eastern Siberian city of Tynda, Amur Oblast, Russia

- July 1 – 2025 Thai political crisis: The Constitutional Court of Thailand suspends Prime Minister Paetongtarn Shinawatra from duty pending a case seeking her dismissal.
- July 4–7 – At least 135 people are killed and over a hundred reported missing during a flood in Central Texas, United States.
- July 11 – August 3 – The 2025 World Aquatics Championships are held in Singapore.
- July 13 – Several clashes erupt in southern Syria between armed Druze and Bedouin groups.
- July 16 – Israeli airstrikes hit the Syrian Presidential Palace and the Syrian General Staff headquarters in Damascus.
- July 21
  - 2025 Dhaka Chengdu J-7 crash: An F-7 BGI training aircraft of the Bangladesh Air Force crashes into Milestone College in Uttara, Dhaka, killing 31 people including the pilot.
  - Twenty-eight countries issue a joint statement calling for an immediate end to the Gaza war, saying it has "reached new depths" in terms of the suffering of civilians.
- July 23 – The International Court of Justice (ICJ) rules that countries can sue each other over historical emissions of greenhouse gases and the effects of climate change.
- July 24
  - Angara Airlines Flight 2311, operated by an Antonov An-24 aircraft, crashes near Tynda in Eastern Siberia, Russia. All 48 people on board are killed.
  - Armed conflicts break out between Cambodia and Thailand after the escalation of a border dispute. At least 39 people are killed and more than 100,000 displaced due to the conflicts.
- July 30 – An M_{w} 8.8 earthquake strikes off the coast of Russia's Kamchatka Peninsula, triggering tsunami warnings in Japan and Hawaii.

=== August ===
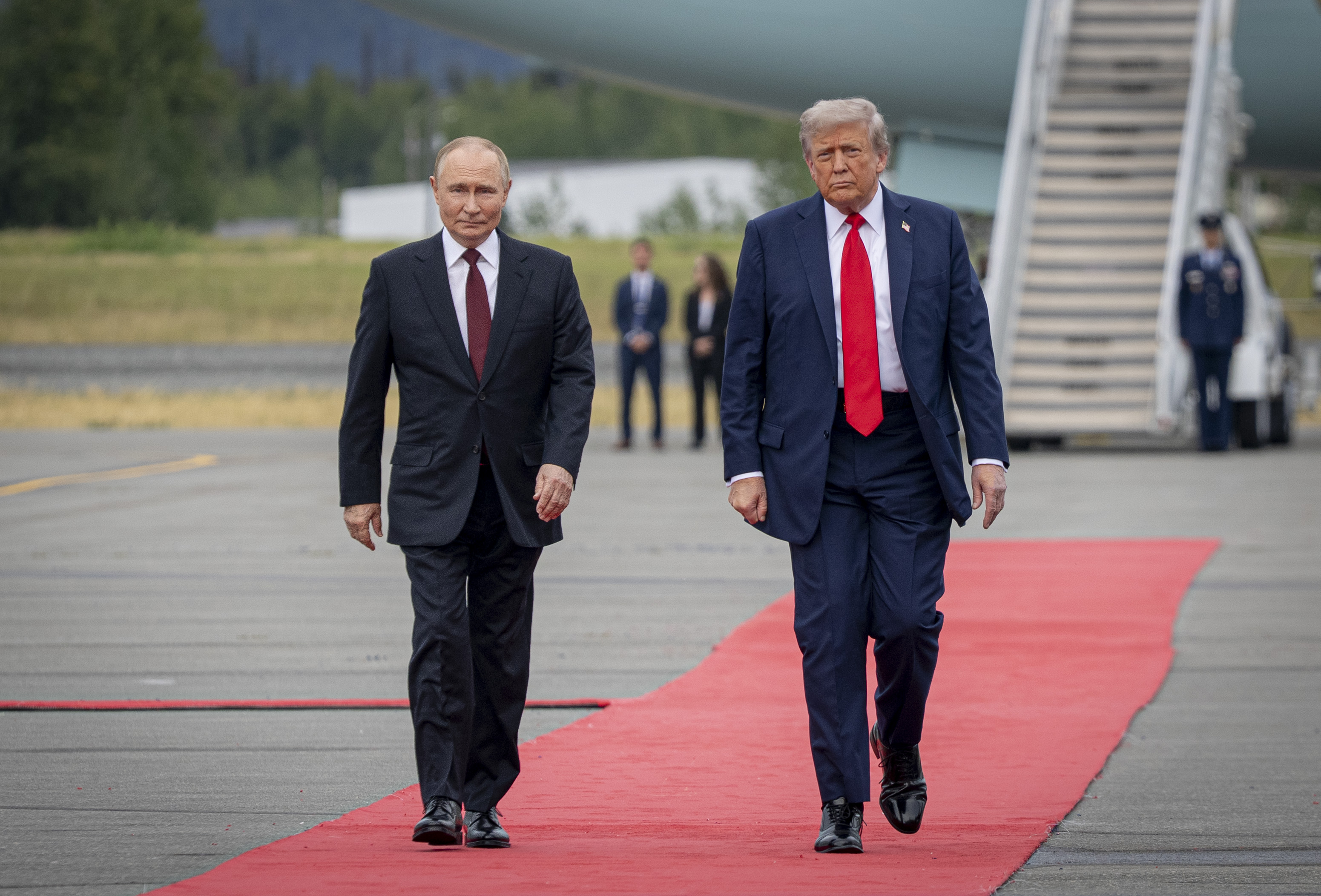
Vladimir Putin and Donald Trump arriving in Anchorage, Alaska, for the Russia–United States Summit on August 15

- August 7–17 – The 2025 World Games are held in Chengdu, China.
- August 7 – OpenAI's model GPT-5 is released.
- August 8 – Armenia and Azerbaijan sign a peace deal to end 37-year-old hostilities regarding the Nagorno-Karabakh conflict.
- August 15 – 2025 Russia–United States Summit: US president Donald Trump meets with Russian president Vladimir Putin in Anchorage, Alaska, to discuss a plan for resolving the Russo-Ukrainian war.
- August 15–17 – The first World Humanoid Robot Games are held in Beijing, China.
- August 19 – A multi-vehicle collision involving a bus carrying migrants deported from Iran, a motorcycle and a truck kills at least 79 people in Herat Province, Afghanistan.
- August 22 – Famine is confirmed in Gaza City for the first time after the UN-backed body responsible for monitoring food security raises its classification to Phase 5, the highest and worst level. The IPC says more than 500,000 people are now facing "starvation, destitution and death".
- August 22 – September 27 – The 2025 Women's Rugby World Cup is held in, and is won by, England.
- August 30 – 2025 Thai political crisis: The Constitutional Court of Thailand removes Prime Minister Paetongtarn Shinawatra from office for ethical misconduct over leaked phone calls she had with former Cambodian Prime Minister Hun Sen.
- August 31
  - An earthquake in eastern Afghanistan kills over 2,200 people and injures 3,500.
  - Between 370 and 1,000 people are reported killed in a landslide caused by heavy rain that buries the village of Tarasin in the Marrah Mountains of Central Darfur and leaves one survivor.

=== September ===
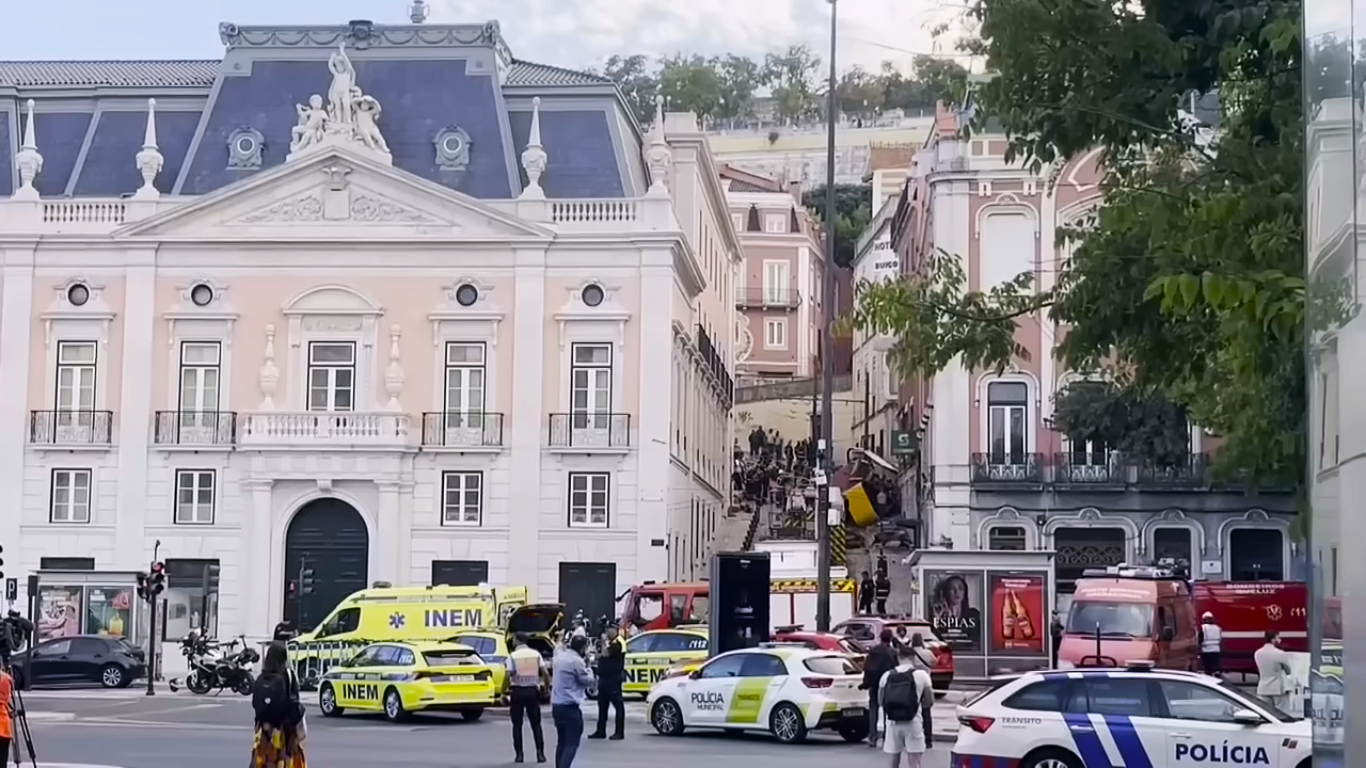
Immediate aftermath of the Ascensor da Glória derailment on September 3, as seen from Restauradores Square, with a dark yellow derailed car toppled into a building on the right

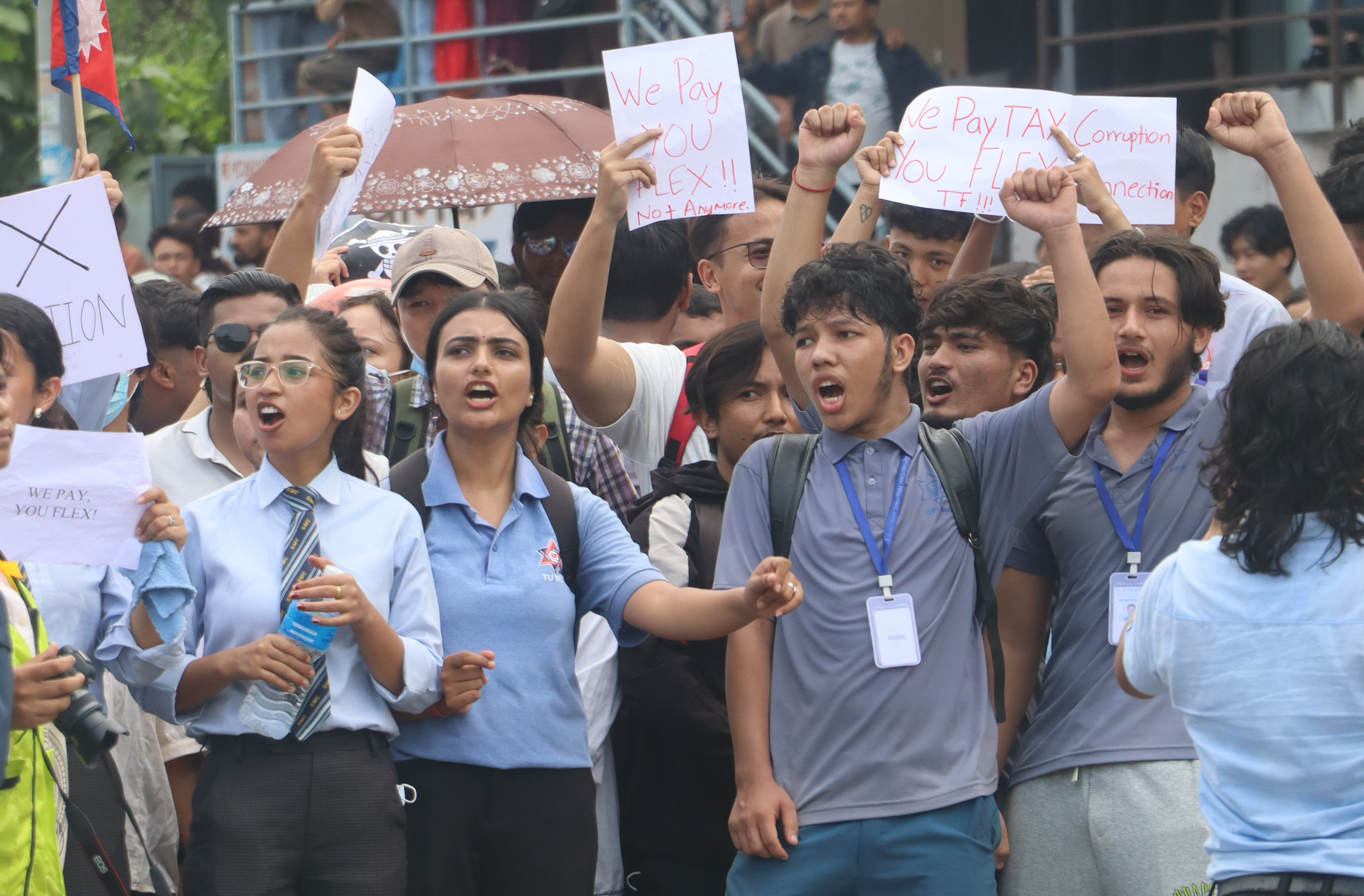
Students during the Nepalese Gen Z protests on September 8

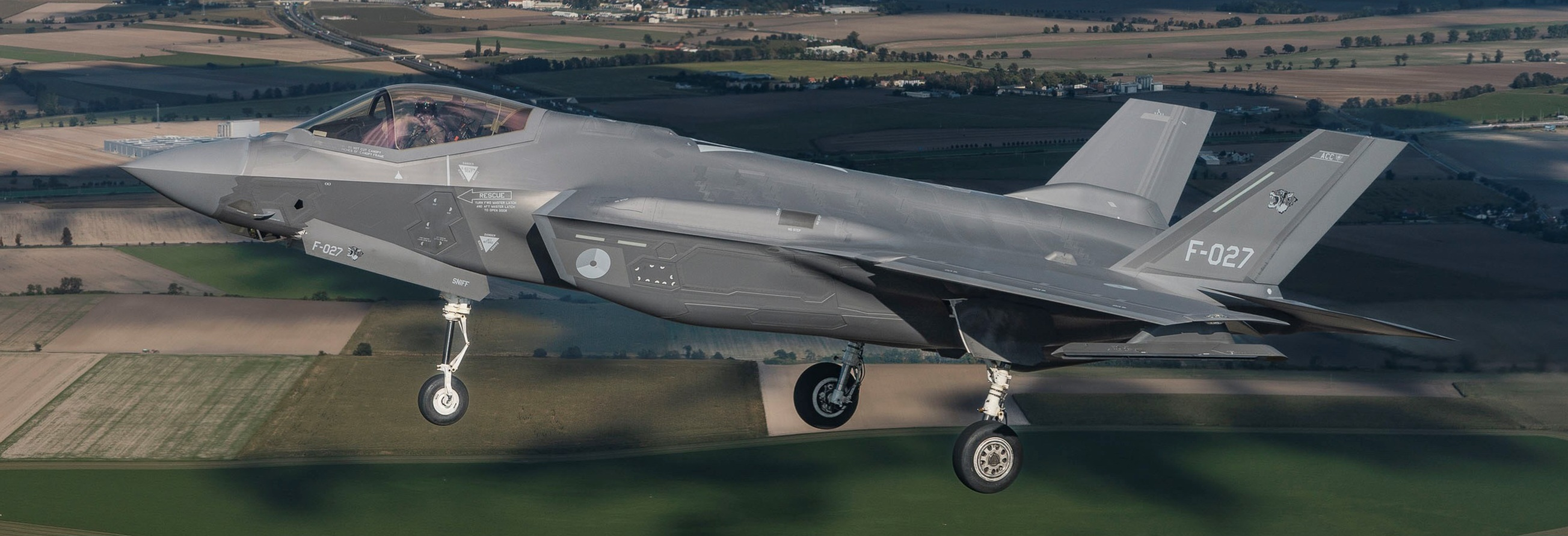
Dutch F-35 patrolling Polish airspace after Russian drone incursion into Poland on September 9

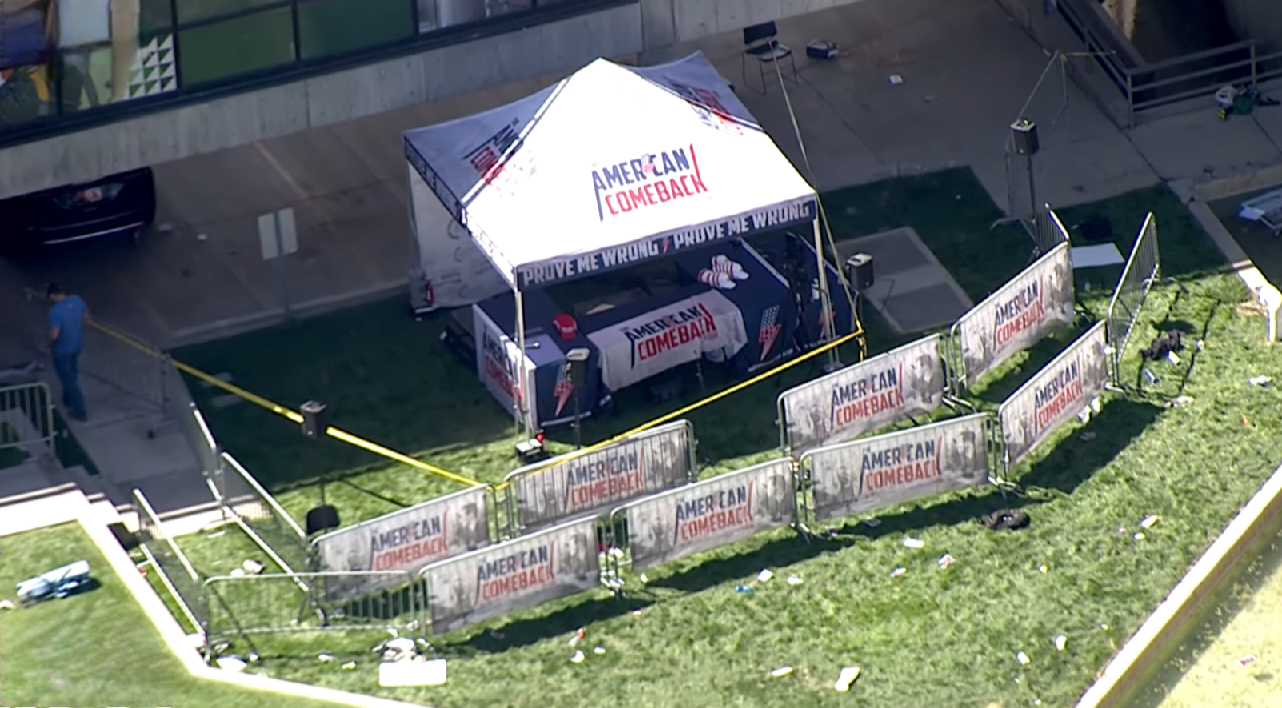
An aerial view of the tent where Charlie Kirk was shot on September 10

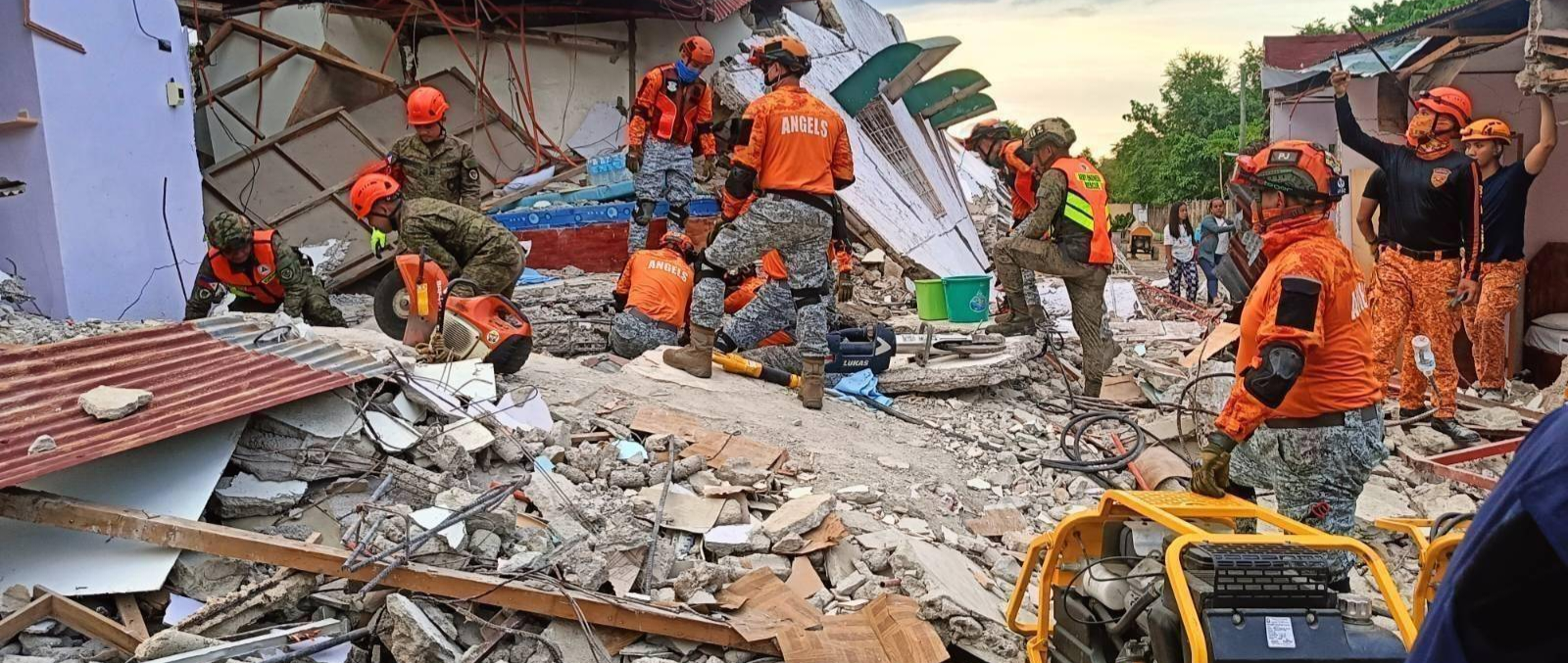
The Philippine Army and the Bureau of Fire Protection join the rescue efforts to the buildings collapsed due to the Cebu earthquake

- September 3 – At least 16 people are killed and over 21 are injured after the Glória funicular derailment in the centre of Lisbon, Portugal.
- September 8
  - 2025 Norwegian parliamentary election: Incumbent Prime Minister Jonas Gahr Støre's coalition retains their majority.
  - 2024–2025 French political crisis: The Bayrou government collapses after losing a no-confidence vote.
  - Mass anti-government protests erupt in Nepal, resulting in at least 22 deaths and hundreds injured. Prime Minister K. P. Sharma Oli resigns the following day amidst the demonstrations.
- September 9
  - The 80th session of the United Nations General Assembly opens in New York City, United States.
  - Israel attacks the Hamas leadership in Doha, Qatar.
  - Russian drone incursion into Poland: Multiple drones breach Polish airspace during a large-scale Russian attack on Ukraine and are intercepted by Polish and NATO forces, marking the first attack on NATO territory and prompting Poland to invoke Article 4.
- September 10
  - A liquid petroleum gas truck overturns and explodes at an overpass in Iztapalapa, Mexico City, killing 32 people and injuring 90 others.
  - Charlie Kirk, an American right-wing activist and influential ally of President Trump, is assassinated at a campus event in Utah, prompting widespread reactions and reprisals both domestically and internationally.
- September 11 – The Supreme Federal Court convicts former Brazilian president Jair Bolsonaro and sentences him to 27 years in prison for his involvement in the 2022 Brazilian coup plot.
- September 12 – Former chief justice Sushila Karki assumes office as interim prime minister of an interim government formed after K. P. Sharma Oli's resignation in Nepal, the decision notably being decided via a poll on a social media platform, Discord.
- September 12–28 – The 2025 FIVB Men's Volleyball World Championship is held in Pasay and Quezon City, the Philippines, and is won by Italy.
- September 13–21 – The 2025 World Athletics Championships are held in Tokyo, Japan.
- September 16
  - 2025 Malawian general election: Peter Mutharika is elected president for a second non-consecutive term.
  - A UN Human Rights Council commission of inquiry finds that Israel has committed genocide against Palestinians in Gaza.
- September 19 – Estonian airspace near Vaindloo island is violated by three Russian MiG-31 jets. In response, Estonia invokes Article 4 of NATO.
- September 20 – Intervision 2025 is held in Moscow, Russia. Vietnamese contestant Đức Phúc wins with the song "Phù Đổng Thiên Vương".
- September 21
  - The UK, Canada, and Australia announce their formal recognition of Palestine as a sovereign state, with France also doing so the next day.
  - Thousands of protesters across the Philippines gather at the EDSA Shrine in Quezon City for the Trillion Peso March and at Luneta Park in Manila for the Baha sa Luneta demonstrations, demanding government accountability over alleged corruption in flood control and infrastructure projects.
- September 27 – 2025 Karur crowd crush: At least 40 people are killed and 51 injured in a crowd crush at a rally held by actor-turned-politician Vijay's party Tamilaga Vettri Kazhagam (TVK) in Karur, Tamil Nadu, India.
- September 28 – 2025 Moldovan parliamentary election: Incumbent pro-European party PAS wins reelection, forming another majority government.
- September 30 – A M_{w} 6.9 earthquake shakes the island of Cebu in the Philippines, leaving 71 people dead and 559 injured.

=== October ===
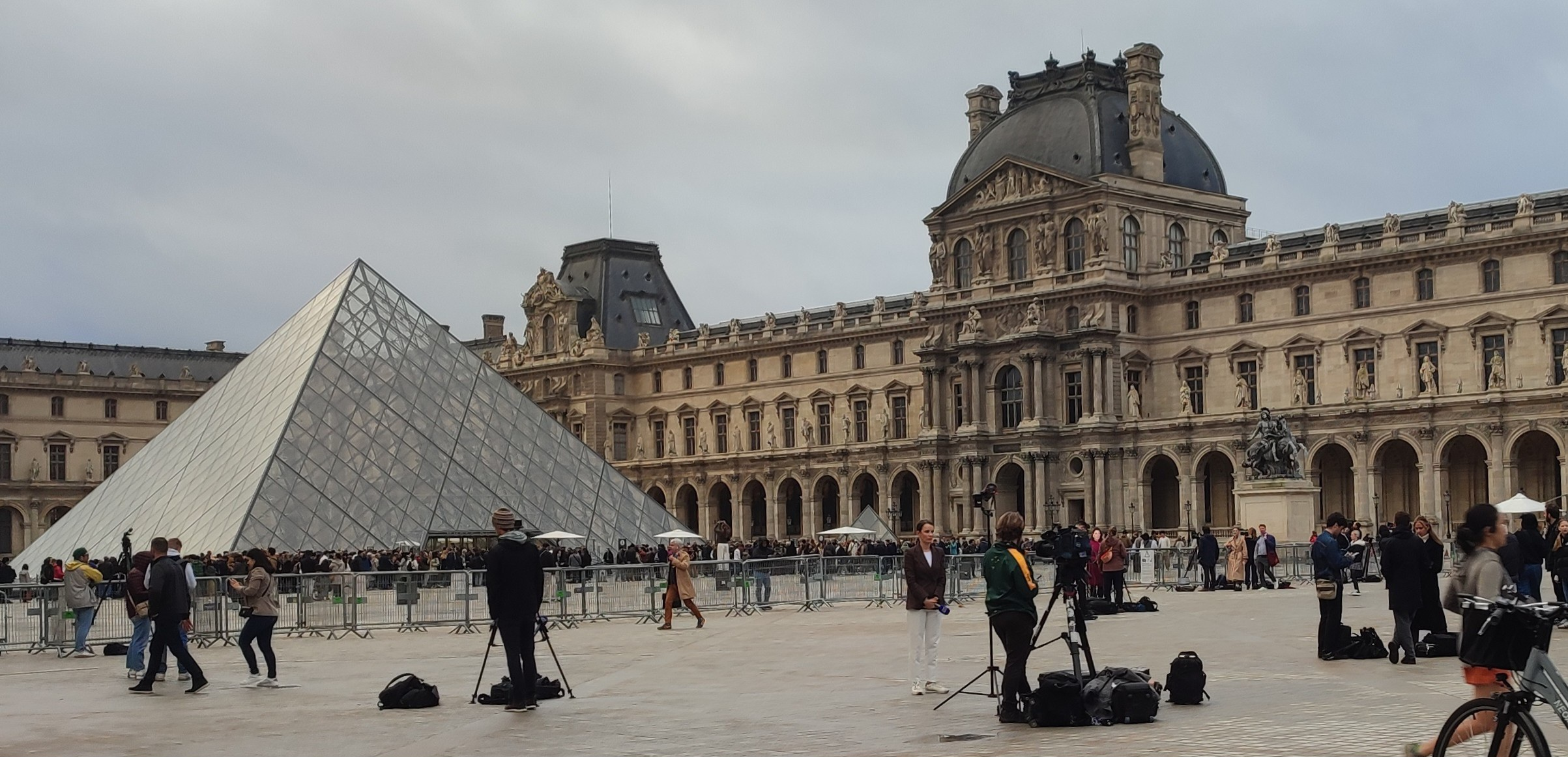
Journalists reporting pieces of the French Crown Jewels were stolen during the Louvre robbery on October 19

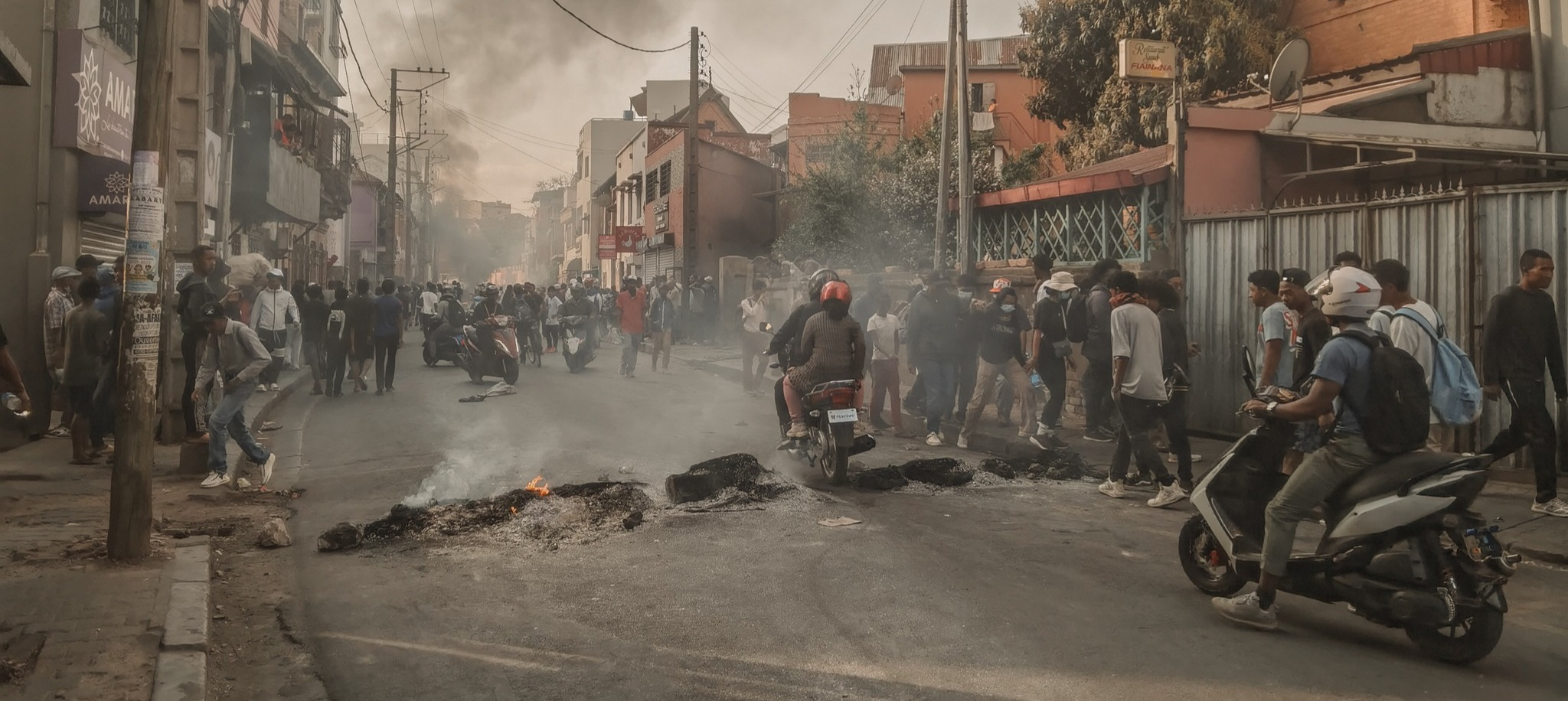
Protest in Antananarivo, Madagascar after the coup on October 22

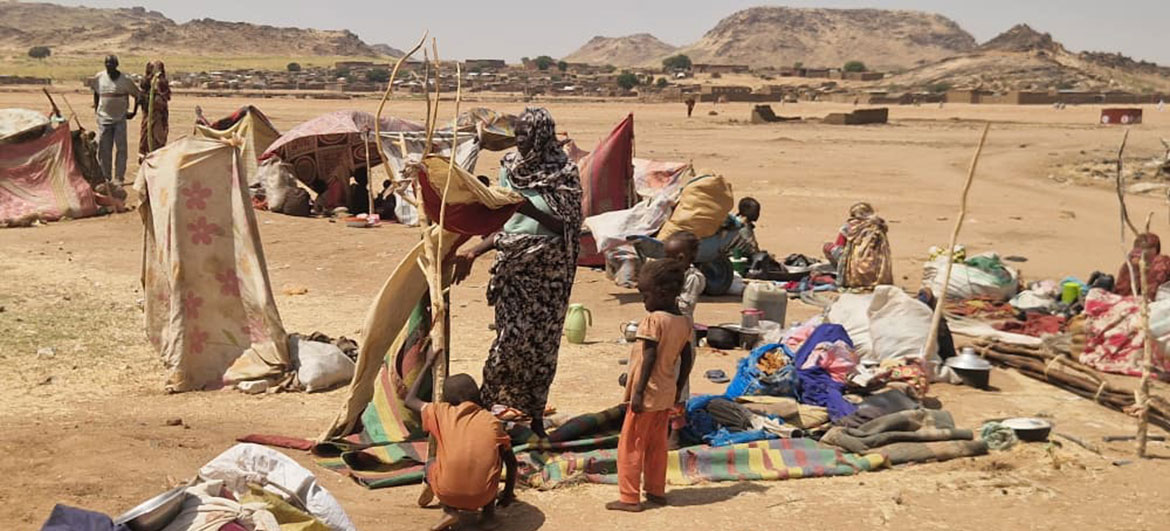
Refugees setting up shelter in Tawila, fleeing El Fasher before massacre on October 26

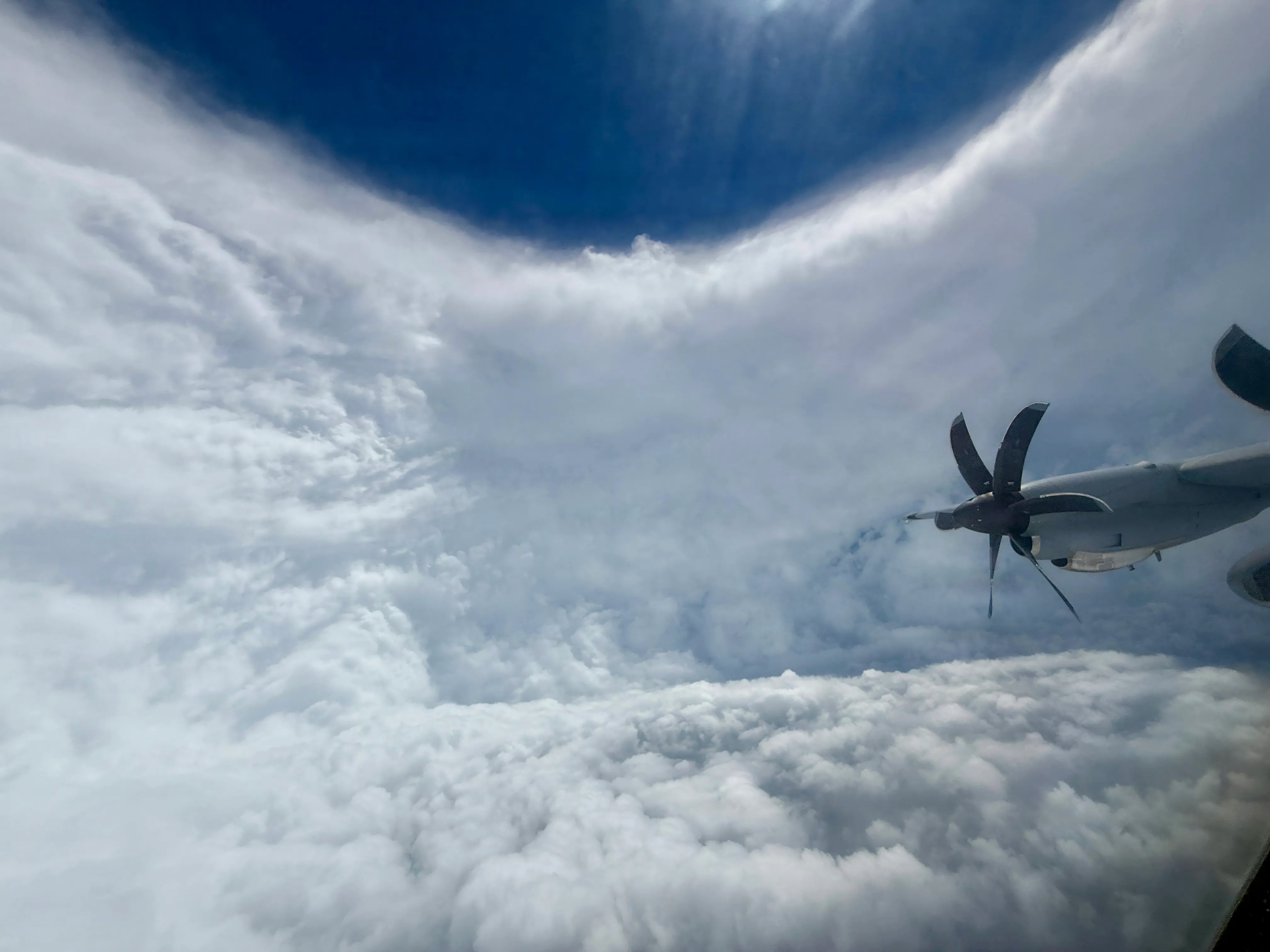
Inside the eye of Hurricane Melissa, one day before peak intensity and landfall in Jamaica on October 28

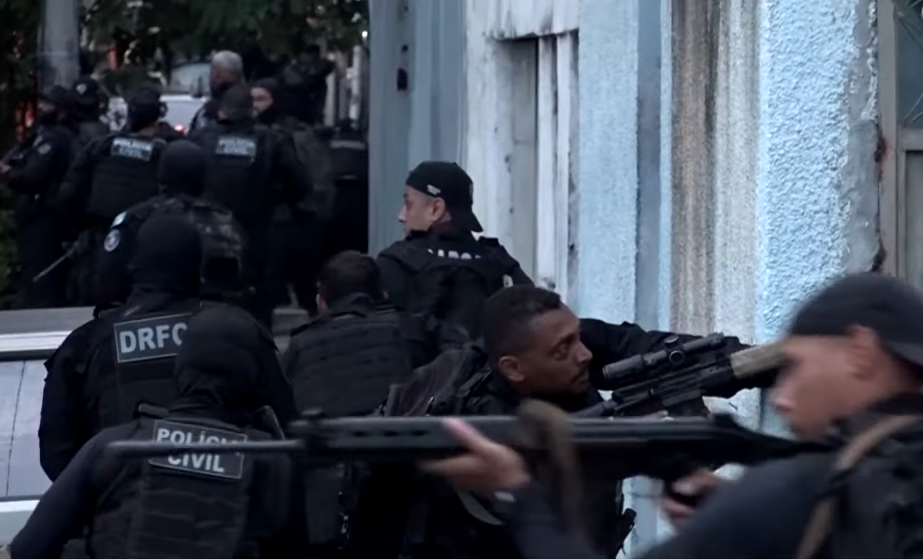
Police officers during Operation Containment on October 28, the deadliest police operation in Brazilian history

- October 1 – Israel intercepts the Global Sumud Flotilla, a fleet carrying humanitarian aid to the Gaza Strip, in international waters, arresting 443 activists from 47 countries.
- October 3
  - Henri, Grand Duke of Luxembourg, abdicates the throne in favor of his son Guillaume.
  - Dame Sarah Mullally is named the first female Archbishop of Canterbury.
- October 3–4 – 2025 Czech parliamentary election: ANO leader and former Prime Minister Andrej Babiš wins a plurality of seats, but fails to reach a majority. Incumbent Prime Minister Petr Fiala's coalition fails to win a majority.
- October 5 – The 2025 Syrian parliamentary election is held, the first since the fall of the Assad regime in 2024.
- October 9
  - Israel and Hamas agree to the first phase of a Gaza peace deal, paving the way for a ceasefire, almost exactly two years after the conflict began.
  - 2025 Afghanistan–Pakistan conflict: Pakistan reportedly carries out airstrikes in Kabul, Khost, Jalalabad, and Paktika, targeting Noor Wali Mehsud, an internationally designated terrorist.
- October 9–11 – 2025 Seychellois general election: Incumbent President Wavel Ramkalawan loses reelection to Patrick Herminie. Ramkalawan's party LDS also loses its majority in parliament.
- October 10 – Dina Boluarte, the President of Peru, is unanimously impeached by the Congress of the Republic.
- October 12
  - 2025 Cameroonian presidential election: Incumbent President Paul Biya is re-elected for an eighth consecutive term.
  - 2025 Malagasy coup d'état: Following a series of protests, incumbent President Andry Rajoelina is ousted and military officer Michael Randrianirina becomes President.
- October 13 – Gaza war: Hamas releases the last 20 living hostages in Gaza after they were kidnapped during the 2023 October 7 attacks. In exchange, Israel releases 250 Palestinian prisoners and more than 1,700 detainees.
- October 14 – Microsoft ends support for Windows 10 that started in 2015.
- October 19
  - 2025 Bolivian general election: Rodrigo Paz wins the presidential election in a runoff against former President Jorge Quiroga. Incumbent party MAS-IPSP loses all their seats in the Senate and all but two seats in the Chamber of Deputies.
  - 2025 Louvre heist: Pieces of the French Crown Jewels are stolen during a robbery from the Galerie d'Apollon of the Louvre in Paris.
- October 21
  - Sanae Takaichi becomes the first female Prime Minister of Japan.
  - American Eric Lu wins the quinquennial XIX International Chopin Piano Competition at the National Philharmonic in Warsaw, Poland.
- October 24 – 2025 Irish presidential election: Independent candidate Catherine Connolly wins the election in a landslide, defeating Fine Gael candidate Heather Humphreys.
- October 26
  - 2025 Argentine legislative election: Incumbent President Javier Milei's party La Libertad Avanza wins the election with over 40% of the votes.
  - Timor-Leste becomes the 11th member state of ASEAN, being the first enlargement of ASEAN since Cambodia's entry in 1999 and comprising all countries of Southeast Asia.
  - El Fashir massacre: Mass murder is reported during which an estimated 2,500 or more civilians have been executed by the Rapid Support Forces in the city of El Fashir, Sudan.
- October 28
  - Hurricane Melissa makes a catastrophic landfall in Jamaica as a Category 5 hurricane, with sustained wind speeds up to 185 mph (295 km/h), becoming the strongest hurricane to strike the country in recorded history.
  - Operation Containment: In Rio de Janeiro, more than 120 people are killed in raids targeting criminal organization Comando Vermelho during the deadliest police operation in Brazilian history.
- October 29 – 2025 Dutch general election: Social liberal party Democrats 66 ties with right-wing populist party Party for Freedom in most number of seats.

=== November ===
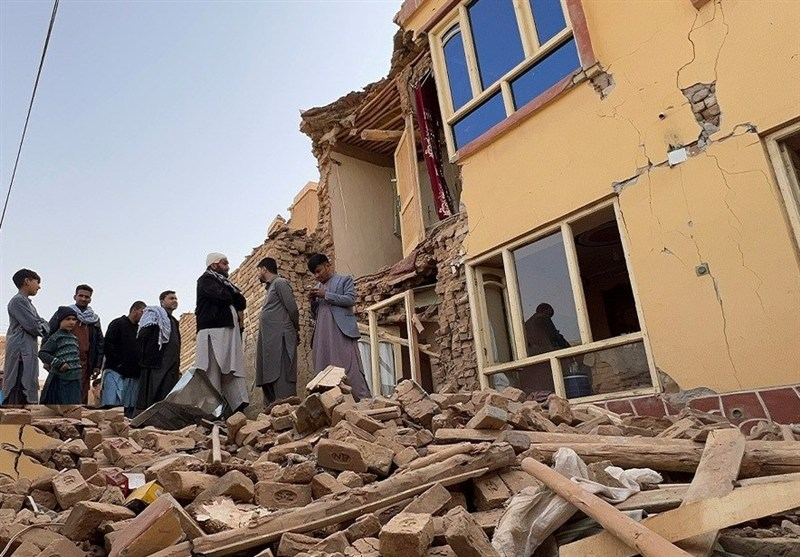
Damage to homes in Samangan Province, Afghanistan, following the Balkh earthquake on November 3

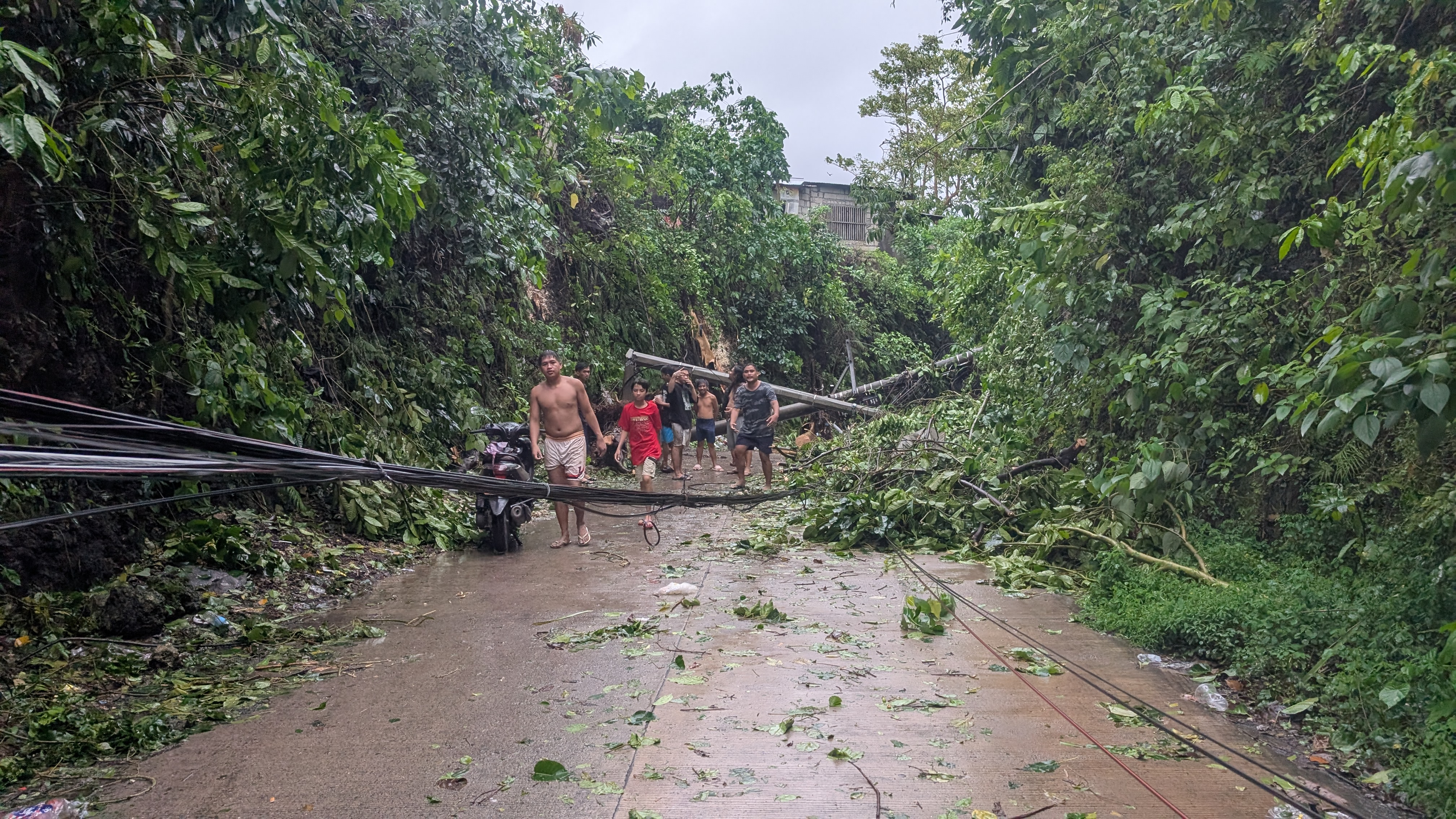
Effects of Typhoon Kalmaegi in Cebu City, Philippines, on November 4

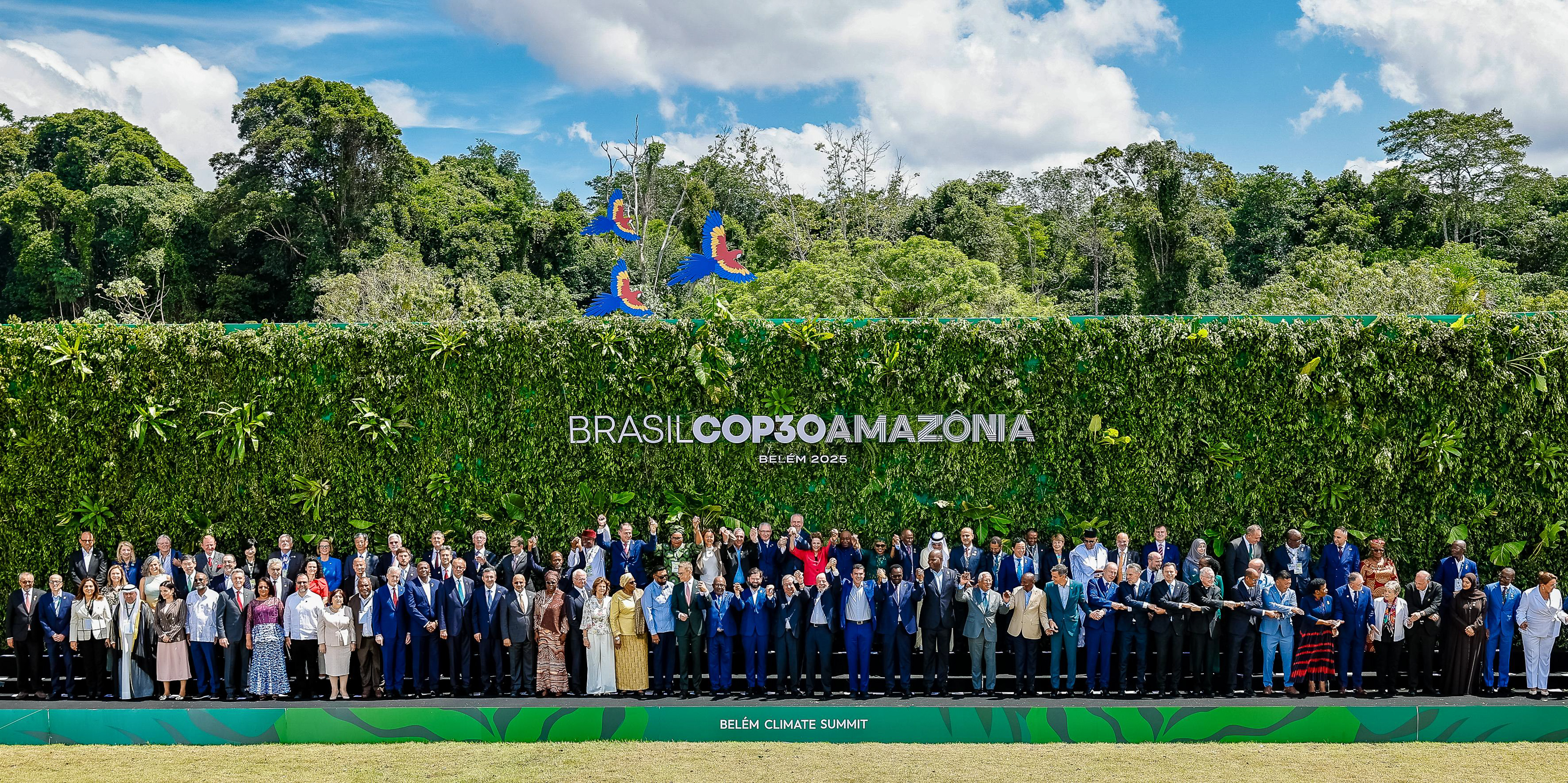
The COP30 summit is held in Belém, Brazil, from November 10–21

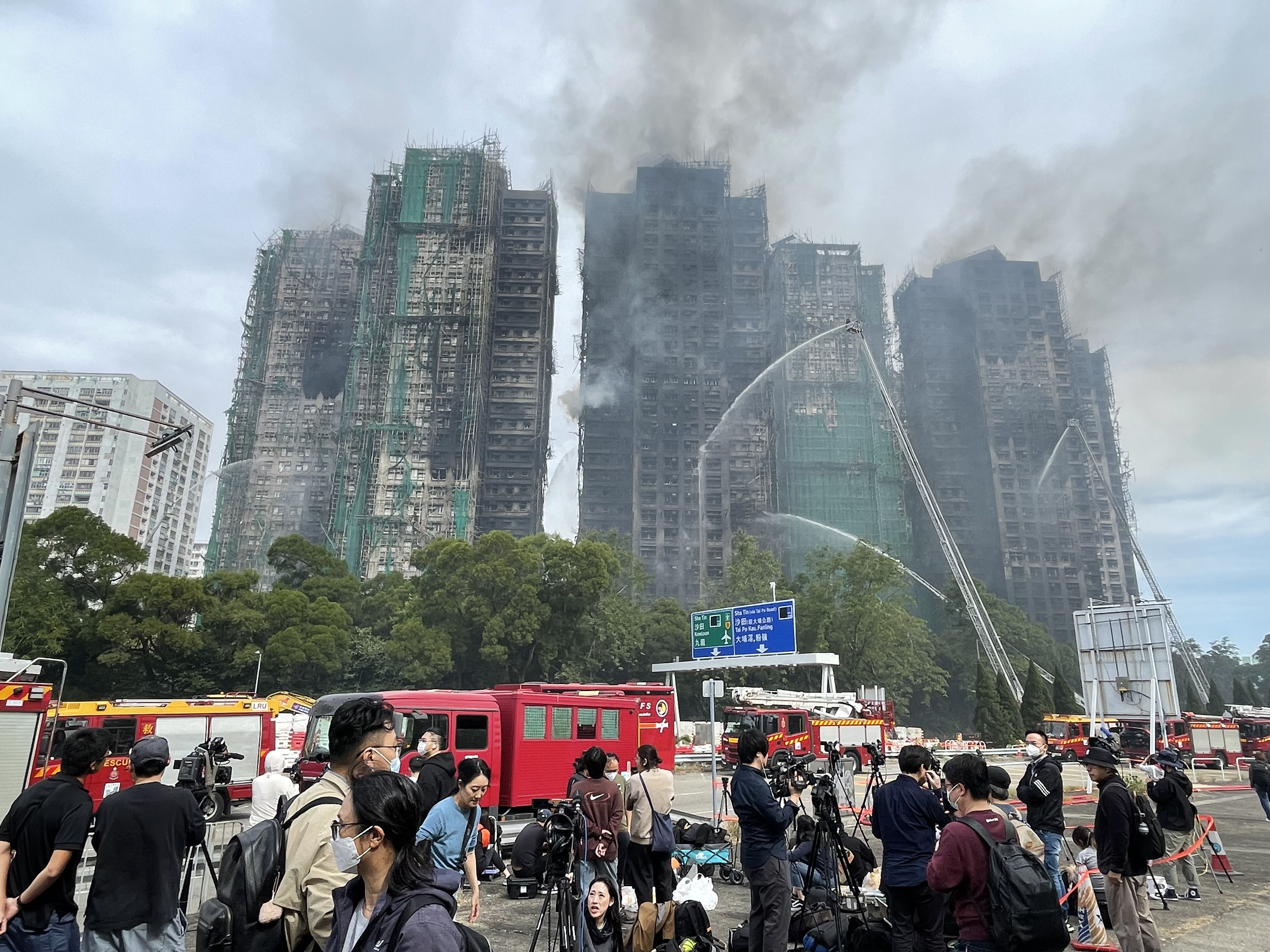
The Wang Fuk Court fire in Hong Kong on November 26

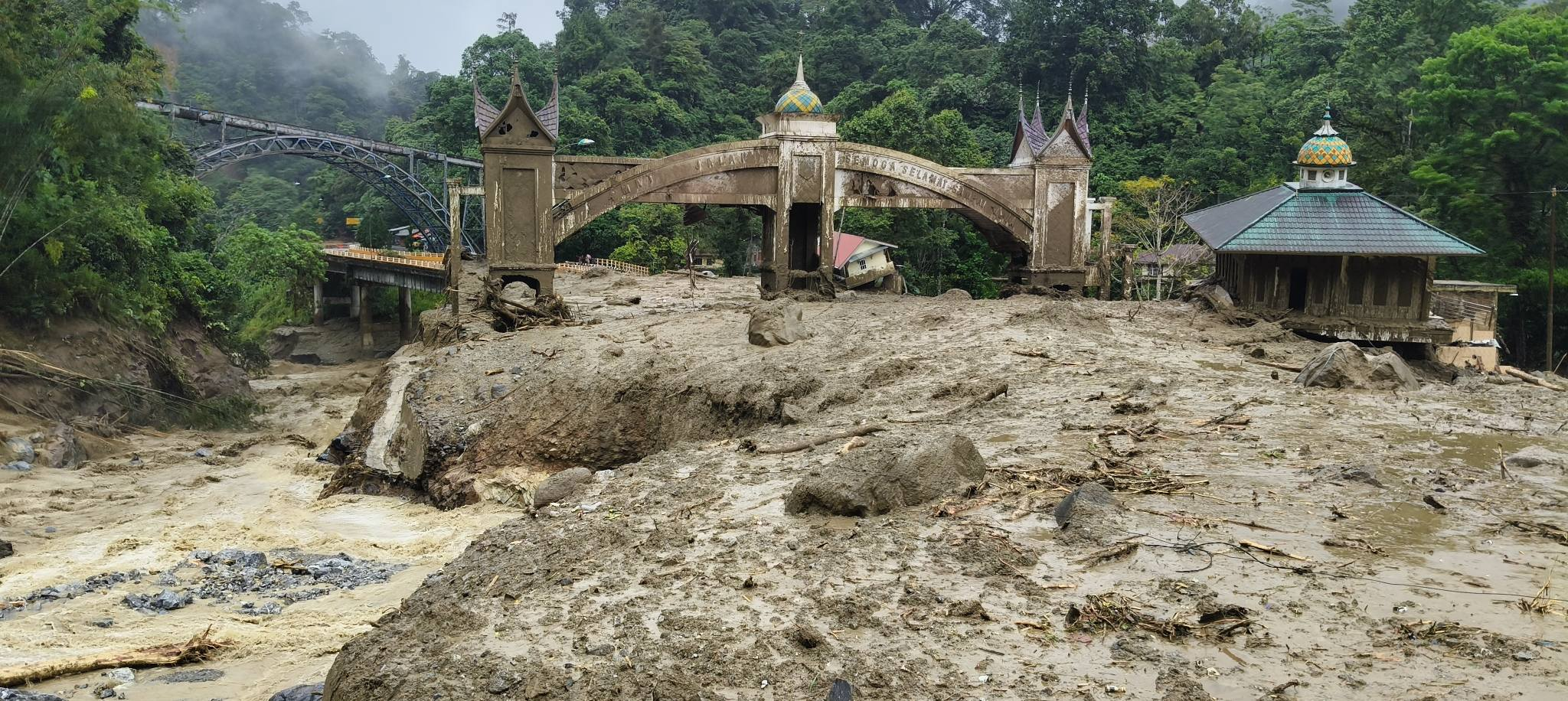
A bridge in Padang Panjang, Indonesia, destroyed by flash floods during Cyclone Senyar on November 27

- November 3 – A powerful M_{w} 6.3 earthquake shakes the provinces of Balkh and Samangan in Afghanistan, causing 31 deaths and 956 injuries.
- November 4
  - Typhoon Kalmaegi leaves more than 288 people dead in the Philippines, Vietnam, and Thailand.
  - UPS Airlines Flight 2976, a Honolulu-bound McDonnell Douglas MD-11F, crashes shortly after take-off near Louisville Muhammad Ali International Airport in Kentucky, United States, killing all three crew members and 12 people on the ground, as well as injuring 22 others.
- November 6 – Khaled El-Enany is elected the new Director-General of UNESCO.
- November 10–21 – The COP30 summit is held in Belém, Brazil, focusing on the role of the Amazon rainforest in climate action.
- November 10 – 2025 Delhi Red Fort blast: At least 15 people are killed and more than 20 people are injured in a car explosion near the Red Fort in Delhi.
- November 11 – 2025 Iraqi parliamentary election: Incumbent Prime Minister Mohammed Shia' al-Sudani's party RDC wins a plurality of seats.
- November 13 – The New Glenn rocket booster lands for the first time.
- November 17 – Former prime minister of Bangladesh Sheikh Hasina is found guilty of crimes against humanity by a Bangladeshi tribunal and sentenced to death in absentia.
- November 21 – December 7 – The 2025 FIFA Futsal Women's World Cup is held in the Philippines, and is won by Brazil.
- November 22–23 – The G20 Johannesburg summit is held in South Africa, the first time a G20 summit has been held in Africa.
- November 23 – 2025 Guinea-Bissau general election: A coup d'état occurs a day before the official results release, overthrowing President Umaro Sissoco Embaló.
- November 24–25 – The second round of the 2025 Egyptian parliamentary election is held.
- November 25 – A report published by the United Nations shows that Indonesian capital Jakarta has surpassed Japanese capital Tokyo as the world's largest city, with a population of 42 million people.
- November 26 – December 14 – The 2025 World Women's Handball Championship is held in Germany and the Netherlands, and is won by Norway.
- November 26
  - A massive fire engulfs the Wang Fuk Court apartment block in Hong Kong, killing at least 168 people and leaving over 150 missing.
  - Cyclone Senyar causes at least 1,390 deaths and leaves 186 missing in Thailand, Malaysia and Indonesia.
- November 27–30 – An ecumenical meeting of the Eastern Orthodox Church and Catholic Church at Nicaea is held to mark the 1,700th anniversary of the First Council of Nicaea.
- November 28 – Flooding and landslides caused by Cyclone Ditwah leave at least 647 dead and 183 missing across Sri Lanka and South India.
- November 30
  - The 2025 Kyrgyz parliamentary election is held.
  - 2025 Honduran general election: Amid allegations of fraud and external interference, National candidate Nasry Asfura narrowly wins the presidency after weeks of delays. The National Party additionally wins a plurality in the National Congress.

=== December ===
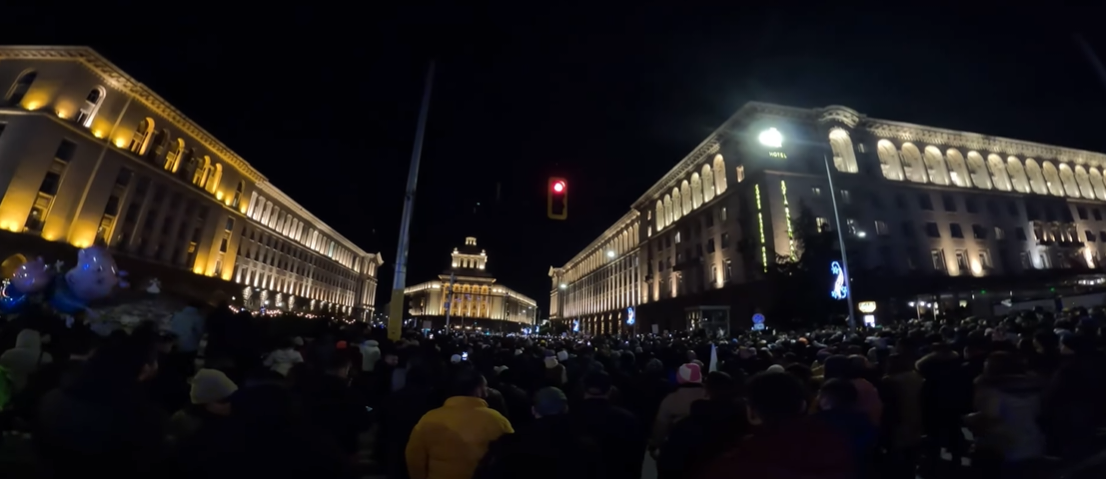
Largo, Sofia, during the Bulgarian protests on December 1

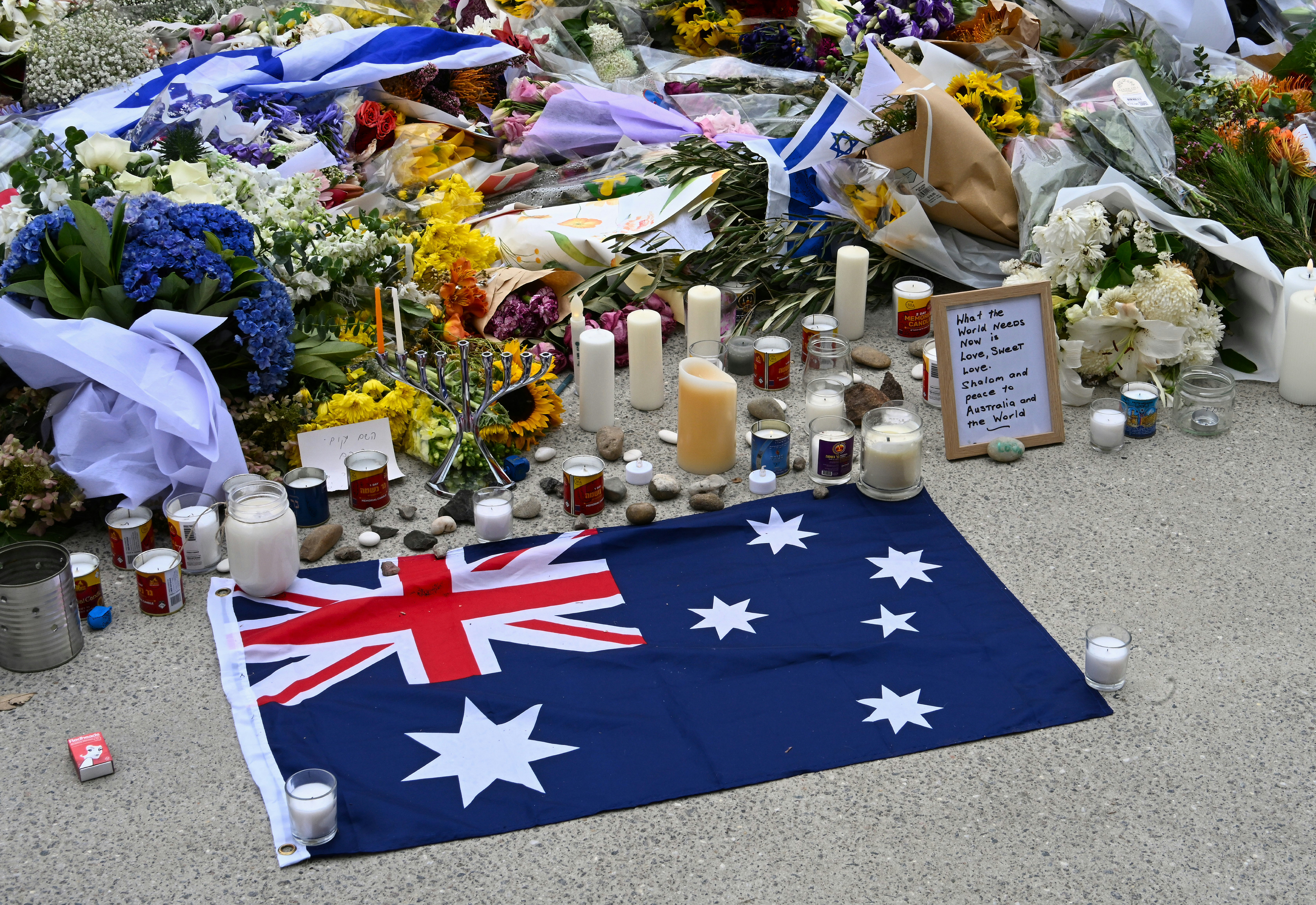
Floral tributes and candles to victims of the Bondi Beach shooting on December 14

- December 2 – Yemeni civil war: The Southern Transitional Council launches a large-scale military offensive across Southern Yemen, breaking years of military stalemate in the conflict.
- December 6
  - Eleven are killed, including three young children, and fourteen are injured in a shooting at a bar in Saulsville, Gauteng, South Africa.
  - A fire at a nightclub in Arpora, Goa, India, leaves at least 25 people dead and 50 injured.
- December 7 – Elements of the Benin Armed Forces, led by Pascal Tigri, announce a coup d'état against president Patrice Talon and the creation of a military junta after seizing state television. However, the coup attempt is thwarted and unsuccessful.
- December 8 – A M_{w} 7.6 earthquake occurs in the Pacific Ocean off the coast of Aomori Prefecture in Japan, triggering a tsunami up to 70 cm high.
- December 11 – Bulgarian political crisis (2021–2026): The Zhelyazkov Government resigns following major protests.
- December 13
  - Belarus releases 123 political prisoners including opposition leaders Maria Kalesnikava, Maxim Znak, Viktar Babaryka, Nobel laureate Ales Bialiatski, and journalists Pavel Sevyarynets and Marina Zolotova in exchange for the lifting of sanctions on the Belarusian potash industry by the United States.
  - The Junior Eurovision Song Contest 2025 is held in Tbilisi, Georgia. French contestant Lou Deleuze wins with the song "Ce monde".
- December 14
  - 2025 Chilean general election: José Antonio Kast is elected President of Chile. Right-wing coalitions gain control of the Chamber of Deputies and tie in the Senate.
  - At least 16 people are killed and 43 injured in a mass shooting, classified as a terrorist attack, by two gunmen at Bondi Beach in Sydney during a celebration for the start of the Jewish festival of Hanukkah.
- December 19 – EU leaders approve a €90bn ($105bn) loan for Ukraine for the next two years, which Kyiv will repay only once Russia pays reparations.
- December 20 – German engineer Michaela Benthaus becomes the first wheelchair user to travel into space, aboard the Blue Origin NS-37.
- December 21 – January 18 – The 2025 Africa Cup of Nations is held in Morocco, and is won by Senegal.
- December 23 – Harmony Jets Flight 185, a Dassault Falcon 50, crashes near Ankara, Turkey, killing all eight people on board, including Libyan Army chief of staff Mohammed al-Haddad.
- December 25 – The United States, in cooperation with the Nigerian government, initiates a series of airstrikes targeting Islamic State-affiliated militants operating in the country's Sokoto State. US President Donald Trump states that rising extremist violence against Christians is a primary reason for the strikes.
- December 26 – Israel becomes the first country to recognize Somaliland.
- December 28
  - 2025 Central African general election: Incumbent president Faustin-Archange Touadéra wins reelection for a third term.
  - 2025 Guinean presidential election: Interim president and 2021 coup d'état leader Mamady Doumbouya wins the presidency in a landslide.
  - December 2025 Kosovan parliamentary election: Incumbent Prime Minister Albin Kurti's party Vetëvendosje wins a fourth consecutive victory, getting 49% of the vote.
  - 2025 Iranian protests: Major protests emerge in Iran following an intense inflation spike that saw a severe depreciation in the Iranian rial. These protests are accompanied with demands for an end to the Islamic republic.

== Nobel Prizes ==
Nobel medal

- Chemistry – Susumu Kitagawa, Richard Robson and Omar M. Yaghi, for the development of metal-organic frameworks.
- Economics – Joel Mokyr, for having identified the prerequisites for sustained growth through technological progress, and Peter Howitt and Philippe Aghion, for the theory of sustained growth through creative destruction.
- Literature – László Krasznahorkai, for his compelling and visionary oeuvre that, in the midst of apocalyptic terror, reaffirms the power of art.
- Peace – María Corina Machado, for her tireless work promoting democratic rights for the people of Venezuela and for her struggle to achieve a just and peaceful transition from dictatorship to democracy.
- Physics – John Clarke, Michel H. Devoret and John M. Martinis, for the discovery of macroscopic quantum mechanical tunnelling and energy quantisation in an electric circuit.
- Physiology or Medicine – Mary E. Brunkow, Fred Ramsdell and Shimon Sakaguchi, for their discoveries concerning peripheral immune tolerance.

== See also ==
- List of elections in 2025
- Gen Z protests
