= Justus A. Akinsanya =

British nurse (1936–2005)

Justus Akinbayo Akinsanya
- Born: Justus Akinbayo Akinsanya; 31 December 1936; Okun-Owa, Ijebu, Nigeria.
- Died: 11 August 2005 (aged 68); London
- Occupations: nurse, human biologist
- Years active: 1936-2005

Justus Akinbayo Akinsanya, FRCN (31 December 1936 – 11 August 2005) was a nurse, human biologist, nurse educator and researcher.

== Early life and career ==
Born in Okun-Owa, Ijebu, Nigeria (near Lagos) in 1936 he came to the United Kingdom aged 21. He started his career in nursing at Abergele Chest Hospital in Wales 1958-1959 where he qualified as a registered fever nurse (gaining a Tuberculosis Association Certificate).

Akinsanya then trained in General Nursing at Crumpsall Hospital, Manchester 1959-1962. In 1967 he did post-registration courses in orthopaedics at Lord Mayor Treloar Hospital in Hampshire, dermatology at St. John's Hospital for Diseases of the Skin in London and psychiatric nursing.

From 1964-1969 he held charge nurse's posts in Essex, Bristol and Bath, before entering the Borough Polytechnic in London to take the Sister Tutors' Diploma course. By 1972 he entered the University of London where he obtained a BSc (Hons) degree in Human Biology. He subsequently found it difficult to find work as a graduate Nurse Tutor, mainly because of the profession's wariness of graduate nurses. Peggy Nuttall of the Nursing Times, persuaded him to write an article, Wanted Tutors: graduates need not apply, one of many articles that Akinsanya was to write, but one that was written under the pseudonym of J Jones Subiar. As a result he was offered a tutor's job at King's College Hospital, London. He went on to hold positions as a teacher, administrator and researcher.

He then returned to Nigeria for a few years where he worked for the Nursing and Midwifery Council of Nigeria (Education) as Deputy Secretary/Acting Registrar 1977-1978 where he set up writers’ workshops for professional nurses in Nigeria in 1977. He was a lecturer at the Institute of Management and Technology in Enugu 1976-1977.

He returned to the UK and gained a PhD at King's College London for his thesis Knowledge of the life sciences as a basis for practice: some problems in nurse education awarded in 1984 This explored his influential concept of bio-nursing, which he defined as clinical nursing that uses in practice the principles of natural sciences such as biology.

From 1985-1989 he was at the Dorset Institute of Higher Education, first as Reader and later Professor and Head of the Health Care Research Unit, making him one of the early nurse-professors. Whilst there he published his influential biography An African 'Florence Nightingale': A biography of Chief (Dr.) Mrs. Kofoworola Abeni Pratt (Vantage, 1987).

He subsequently took up the post of Academic Dean and Pro-Vice Chancellor of the newly created Faculty of Health and Social Work at Anglia Polytechnic University 1989-1996, where his wife, Cynthia Marcelle, worked as a lecturer in pre-registration nursing.

Akinsanya highlighted racial injustice through his work for the Commission for Racial Equality and the Royal College of Nursing (RCN) He persuaded the Commission for Racial Equality to fund a study, and was shocked to discover widespread racism in the National Health Service. On discovering the only reports were on doctors, he researched and self published his work Ethnic minority nurses, midwives and health visitors what role for them in the National Health Service? (Self published, London 1986) He also sat on the RCN working party on nursing in a multiracial society and he was the first black member of the English National Board for Nursing, Midwifery and Health Visiting 1988 -1993.

In 1991, Akinsanya published the results of a major national study of attitudes of nurses and their teachers to Aids he had carried out in Who Will Care? a survey of the knowledge and attitudes of hospital nurses to people with HIV/AIDS: report submitted to the Department of Health (Anglia Polytechnic, Chelmsford 1991)

He was made an Emeritus Professor by the Dorset Institute upon his retirement in 1996, and then devoted his time to the charitable activities of Disability Croydon, Nurses Fund for Nurses and the Nigerian Council of Elders, and served as a local education authority (LEA) governor of two schools in Croydon.

== Personal life ==
He had been involved in the Nursing Council of Nigeria and he was made a fellow of the UK Royal College of Nursing (FRCN) in 1988.

== Death ==
He died in London at the age of 68 after contracting an infection at the International Council of Nurses conference in Taiwan some months earlier.
