= College of Nursing Sciences, Maiduguri =

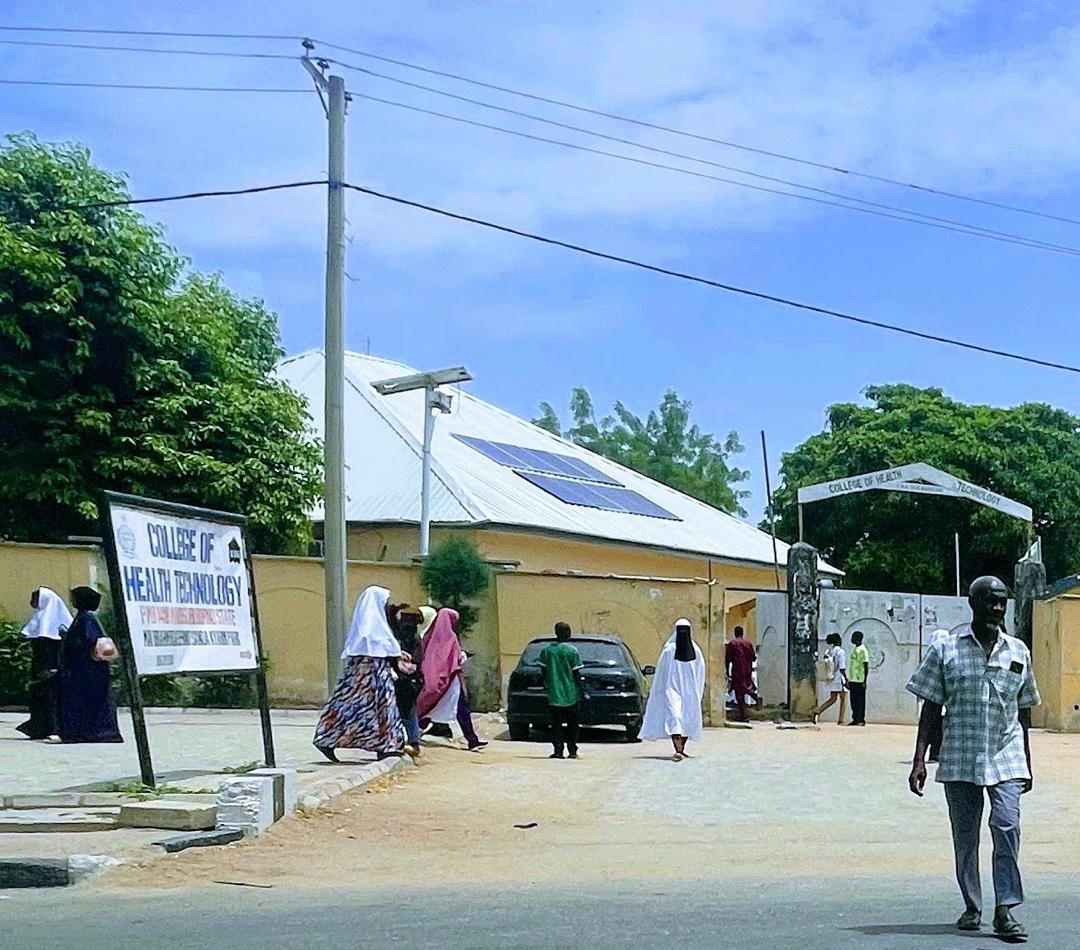
- Former names: School of Nursing, Maiduguri
- Type: Public
- Established: 1981
- Parent institution: University of Maiduguri Teaching Hospital
- Affiliations: Nursing and Midwifery Council of Nigeria
- Location: Maiduguri, Borno State, Nigeria
- Campus: Urban
- Website: www.umth.gov.ng/cons/

College of Nursing Sciences, Maiduguri is a public nursing institution located in Maiduguri, Borno State, Nigeria. It operates under the regulatory framework of the Nursing and Midwifery Council of Nigeria (NMCN). as an approved centre for the training of nurses and midwives in Nigeria.

== History ==
The institution was established in 1981 as the School of Nursing, Maiduguri to train professional nurses for the healthcare sector in northeastern Nigeria. It later became the College of Nursing Sciences, Maiduguri following reforms in nursing education that introduced the National Diploma (ND) and Higher National Diploma (HND) programmes.

== Administration and regulation ==
The College of Nursing Sciences, Maiduguri is administered by the Borno State Ministry of Health and is professionally regulated by the Nursing and Midwifery Council of Nigeria (NMCN). The council is responsible for accrediting nursing and midwifery programmes, approving academic curricula, conducting professional examinations, and registering qualified graduates for professional practice in Nigeria.

== Admissions ==
Admission into the programmes of the College of Nursing Sciences, Maiduguri is conducted in accordance with the admission policies of the Borno State Ministry of Health, the Nursing and Midwifery Council of Nigeria (NMCN), and other relevant regulatory authorities. The admission process is competitive and is usually conducted annually through the sale of application forms, screening exercises, and entrance examinations.

Applicants seeking admission into the National Diploma (ND) Nursing programme are generally required to possess a minimum of five credit passes in the West African Senior School Certificate Examination (WASSCE), National Examinations Council (NECO), or their equivalent. The required subjects typically include English language, Mathematics, Biology, Chemistry, and Physics, obtained in not more than two sittings.

Candidates who meet the minimum academic requirements are invited to participate in a screening exercise, which may include a computer-based test or written entrance examination, followed by an oral interview. Successful applicants are offered admission based on their performance, available admission quota, and compliance with the requirements of the relevant regulatory bodies.

Admission procedures and eligibility requirements may vary depending on the programme and are subject to periodic review in accordance with national policies governing nursing education in Nigeria.

== Location ==
The college is situated in Maiduguri, a community in Borno State, Northeastern Nigeria. The location places it within reach of major healthcare facilities in the state, which serve as clinical training sites for students.

== See also ==
Nursing and Midwifery Council of Nigeria
