= 2026 Maiduguri bombings =

Bombings in Maiduguri, Nigeria

- Locations bombed, chronologically: University of Maiduguri Teaching Hospital; Post Office; Monday Market
- Location: Maiduguri, Borno State, Nigeria
- Date: 16 March 2026 c.7:24 p.m. WAT (UTC+01:00)
- Attack type: Suicide bombings; mass murder
- Deaths: 27+
- Injuries: 146
- Perpetrator: Boko Haram (suspected)

On 16 March 2026, three suspected suicide bombings were carried out at three locations in Maiduguri, Borno State, Nigeria. The bombings occurred during a year-long peaceful stretch in the city. At least 27 people were killed and 146 others were injured. No group has claimed responsibility, but Nigerian authorities suspect Boko Haram is behind the attack.

== Background ==
Boko Haram originated in Maiduguri and the city became the epicentre of the group's insurgency, which began in 2009. Until the bombing that killed five people and injured 35 others at a crowded mosque in December 2025, there had not been a major attack in the city since 2021. Hours before the bombings in the early morning, suspected Boko Haram insurgents attempted to infiltrate the Ajilari Cross area of the city. Sporadic gunfire was heard across the neighbourhood. Footage showed some infrastructure set ablaze.

== Bombings ==
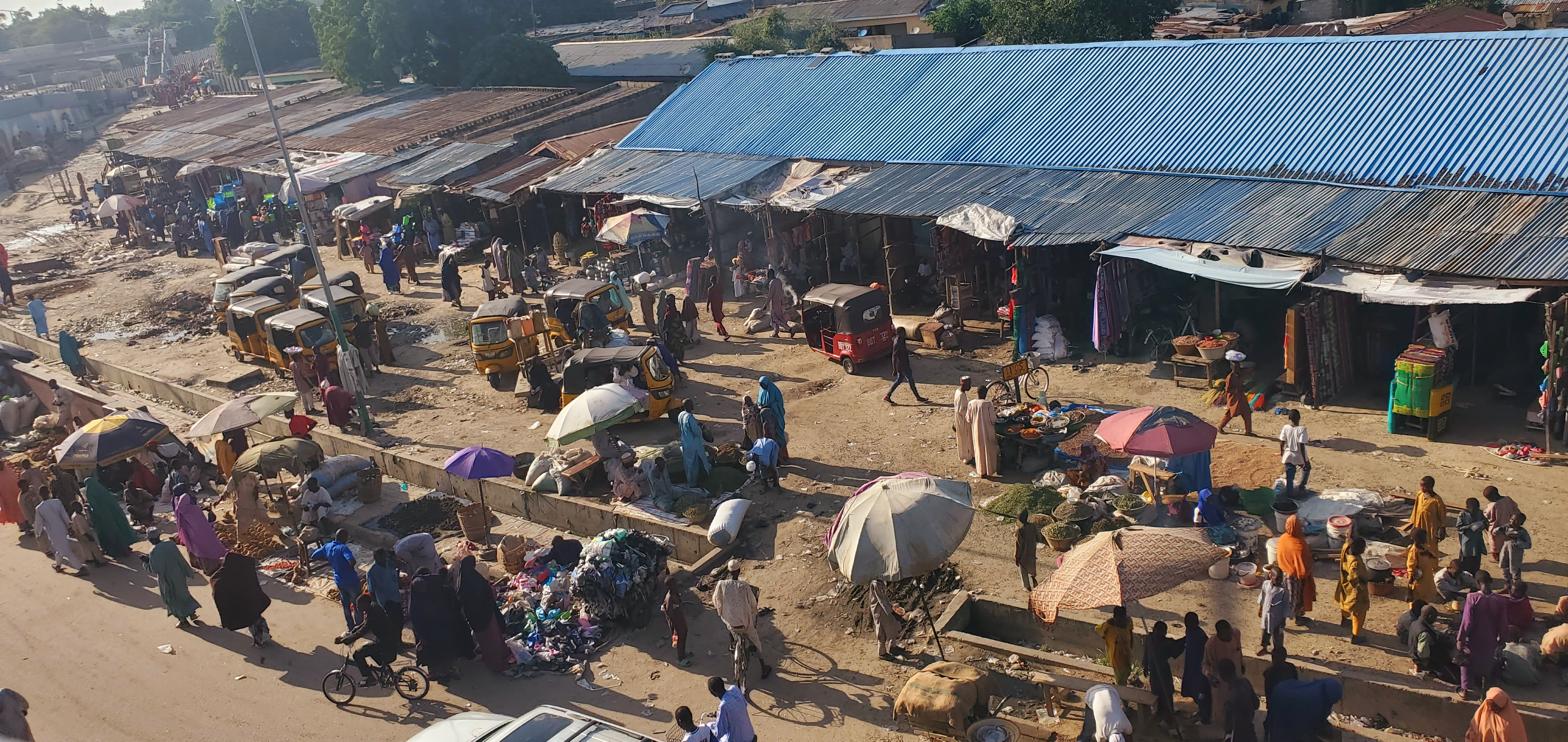
The Monday Market, where one of the bombings took place

The blasts occurred simultaneously around 7:24 p.m. at the entrance of the University of Maiduguri Teaching Hospital and two local markets known as Post Office and Monday Market during a busy time when traders were closing for the day and residents were returning home after breaking their Ramadan fast. A security guard told BBC News that when three people arrived on a motorbike at the hospital, they were asked to leave due to being suspicious. When they returned a second time, the guard refused to let them in, and they threw two food containers at him. Both exploded, injuring him in the arms and legs. He described the attack as "like a palm tree". The scenes were immediately secured, cordoned off, and subjected to thorough sweep operations. Property worth millions of naira was destroyed in the explosions.

== Victims ==
The state police command initially said that at least 23 people were killed and 108 others were injured. Two days after the attack, the Zonal Coordinator of the National Emergency Management Agency (NEMA) said at least 27 people were killed and 146 others were injured. One man lost four of his children. 108 injured victims were admitted to the University of Maiduguri Teaching Hospital, 20 at Umaru Shehu Hospital and 17 at Maiduguri Specialist Hospital.

Families of the victims said the number of casualties may be higher. One resident said they saw over 200 injured people on the ground, each with varying degrees of injuries. Shop owners said they evacuated more than 60 people. In other areas, including Gwange, residents reported burying more than 30 people.

== Perpetrators ==
The Nigerian Armed Forces blamed the attacks on Boko Haram militants; however, no group claimed any responsibility.

== Aftermath ==
Top security chiefs were deployed to Maiduguri by president Bola Tinubu to tighten security. Police in Yobe State also heightened security across the state. The Nigerian Army raised the alarm over possible deployment of suicide bombers in Maiduguri, urging residents to avoid crowded places. A false post was widely spread across social media saying that United States president Donald Trump accused Tinubu of prioritizing diplomatic engagements over security and protection of citizens.

== Reactions ==
The Committee of Chief Medical Directors and medical directors of Federal Tertiary Hospitals called for strengthened security around health facilities following the attacks. Chairman of the committee, Prof. Saad Ahmed said in a statement that the attacks were barbaric, senseless, and unacceptable, urging immediate measures to prevent future occurrences. The National Association of Nigerian Students condemned the attacks, calling them a "senseless act of violence", and demanded an investigation.

The Nigeria Governors' Forum condemned the attacks, describing them as shocking and despicable. The African Democratic Congress called for president Bola Tinubu to return home from the United Kingdom without delay and condemned the attacks. The Peoples Democratic Party condemned the attacks, saying the government failed to tackle insecurity. The governor of Borno State, Babagana Zulum, condemned the attacks, describing them as "despicable, cruel and cowardly", according to The Punch.

The United Arab Emirates Ministry of Foreign Affairs condemned the attacks and expressed condolences to the families of the victims and the people of Nigeria.

== See also ==
- March 2015 Maiduguri suicide bombing
- 2024 Gwoza bombings
- List of massacres in Nigeria
