= Nursing and Midwifery Council of Nigeria =

Nigerian healthcare regulator

The Nursing and Midwifery Council of Nigeria (abbr. NMCN), is the sole governing body that regulates all cadres of nurses and midwives in Nigeria. It was established by government decree in 1979, and re-established as a parastatal by the government of Nigeria by Act Cap. No 143 Laws of the Federation of Nigeria, 2004.

The council maintains standards of practice, and enforces discipline within the Nigerian nursing profession. It also accredits education in nursing and midwifery, awarding certificates and a diploma in midwifery and nursing after a three year programme. The council is headed by a secretary-general/registrar, who is assisted by other professional and non-professional staff. They are responsible to a board reporting to the Federal Ministry of Health.

== History ==
Originally founded in 1949 as the Nursing Council of Nigeria, it operated in parallel with the Midwives Board of Nigeria, until a government decree of 1979 which merged the organizations. The Nursing and Midwifery Council of Nigeria was formally established by decree No. 89 of 1979. Adetoun Bailey was the first registrar.

== Headquarters and locations ==
The council has its headquarters in Abuja. Other zonal offices are located in Sokoto, Kaduna, Bauchi, Enugu, Port Harcourt, and Lagos.

== Notable nurses and midwives ==
- Kofoworola Abeni Pratt
- Idowu Philip
- Elfrida O. Adebo
- Veronica Nnaji
- Omo-Oba Adenrele Ademola
- Grace Ebun Delano

== See also ==
Indigenous midwifery practices in Africa
