= Adetoun Olabowale Bailey =

Nigerian nurse

Adetoun Olabowale Bailey, née Odufunade is a Nigerian nurse and nursing administrator.

== Life ==
Bailey trained in London as an orthopaedic nurse and registered midwife. She qualified as a nurse in 1951, and in the early 1950s worked as a staff nurse, student midwife and nursing sister in the UK and Nigeria. From 1956 to 1958 she was a ward administrator and teaching sister at General Hospital, Limbe, Cameroon. From 1958 to 1961 she was operating theatre sister at General Hospital, Lagos.

Bailey was secretary of the Midwives Board of Nigeria from 1962 to 1972 and secretary of the Nursing Council of Nigeria from 1972 to 1977. When the two organizations were merged as the Nursing and Midwifery Council of Nigeria in 1979, she served as its first registrar.

She was co-ordinating editor of a book series of textbooks on tropical nursing and health sciences published by Macmillan from 1974 onwards, and co-authored several titles in the series.

In 1981 she served as President of the International Women's Society, Nigeria.

== Works ==
- (with C. K. O. Uddoh) Nutrition. Macmillan Education, 1980. ISBN 978-0333284377
- (with Victoria A. Ajayi) Textbook of Midwifery. Macmillan Education, 1980. ISBN 978-0333275849
- (with Anu Adegoroye) Community Health Care. Macmillan Education, 1984. ISBN 978-0333286234
