= Brenda Katwesigye =

Ugandan telecom engineer, entrepreneur, tech innovator

Brenda Katwesigye Baganzi
- Citizenship: Ugandan
- Education: bachelor's degree in telecommunication engineering, Master of Business Administration
- Alma mater: Makerere University, Smith School of Business Queen’s University
- Occupations: Engineer, Entrepreneur,CEO Wazi Vision
- Awards: Africa Rethink Award for African Female Entrepreneur 2016. Public Health Award for best Innovation in Health. International Telecommunication Union's Young Innovators Award.

Brenda Katwesigye Baganzi is a Ugandan telecom engineer, entrepreneur, chief executive officer and co founder of Wazi Vision Uganda's first eyewear design and manufacturing company from recycled plastic in 2016. She is also the CEO Wazi Recycling Industries and 2016 Mandela Washington fellow.

She is a board member of the Regional Advisory Board for the Young African Leaders a Forbes-recognized entrepreneur and mentioned in the 2019 Forbes New Wealth Creators’ list by Forbes Africa.

== Early life and background ==
In her childhood, Katwesigye needed eyeglasses to see clearly, which were expensive. This challenge birthed the start of Wazi Vision, which manufactures eyeglasses from recycled plastic and focuses on providing affordable eye testing and glasses.

Through embracing the power of virtual reality technology and developing mobile applications, Wazi came up with a mobile application that uses virtual reality technology to perform visual acuity tests.

== Education ==
She did a bachelor's degree in telecommunication engineering Makerere University in Uganda.

MBA program at Smith School of Business, Queen’s University 2022.

== Career ==
With her first business at the university being to keep phones for visitors at Ush Shs 1000, she also founded InstaHealth, a company that was focused on bringing health professionals to patients in real time but unfortunately failed. After her bachelors, she worked at Innovation Village in Kampala, as the Innovation Strategy Lead, Associate Managing Consultant at Mastercard and worked at Orange Uganda.

She worked with Deloitte Uganda as a Certified Information Systems Auditor and quit to start Wazi Vision with the aim of providing more affordable means of diagnosing refractive errors and providing affordable eyeglasses made from recycled plastic.

== Awards and achievements ==
- Named among 30 innovators of year 2018 by Quartz Africa.
- She was appointed on the board of the STARTS Prize.
- She is a board member of the Regional Advisory Board for the Young African Leaders.
- 2016 Mandela Washington fellow.
- Forbes-recognized entrepreneur.
- 2018 Westerwelle Foundation fellow.
- Mentioned in the 2019 New Wealth Creators’ list by Forbes Africa.
- Alumni of Vodafone’s FLANE program.
- Won Africa Rethink Award for African Female Entrepreneur 2016.
- Won International Telecommunication Union's Young Innovators Award.
- Won Public Health Award for best Innovation in Health .
- Won SITIC Toumai Grand Prize for Innovation

== See also ==
- Anne Juuko
