= Ruth Oshikanlu =

Nigeria-born nurse and entrepreneur (born 1973)

Ruth Oshikanlu FRCN, MBE
- Born: 1973 (age 52–53); Lagos, Nigeria
- Occupation: Social entrepreneur

Ruth Oshikanlu FRCN, MBE (born 1973) is a Nigerian nurse, midwife and health visitor, best known as a social entrepreneur.

Oshikanlu was born in 1973 in Lagos, Nigeria. She attended Queen's College, Lagos before relocating to the United Kingdom at the age of 17. She initially completed a diploma in computing and electronics, before her career in nursing, midwifery and health visiting.

== Education ==
From 1993 to 1996 Oshikanlu trained as a nurse at King's College London, registering as a nurse in 1996. Also at Kings she completed the Leading, Managing and Developing Nursing course incorporating ENB 998 in 1997, and the Care Provision for People Affected by HIV (ENB 934) in 2001.

In 2004 Oshikanlu completed the Diploma in Tropical Nursing at The London School of Hygiene and Tropical Medicine. In 2006 she completed the Community Practitioner Nurse Prescriber at London South Bank University. And in 2012 she completed the Nurse First Programme - Postgraduate Diploma in Social Innovation at Buckinghamshire New University.

From 1997 to 1999 Oshikanlu gained her BSc (Hons) in Midwifery at Thames Valley University, registering as a midwife in 1999

Oshikanlu trained as a Registered Specialist Community Public Health Nurse (Health Visiting) RSCPHN (HV) between 2005 and 2006 at London South Bank University, where she went on to gain a Postgraduate Diploma in Public Health (Health Visiting) in 2006.

In 2006 Oshikanlu completed Parent Adviser Training at King's College London. In 2015 Oshikanlu was awarded an MSc in Social Innovation at Buckinghamshire New University.

In 2019 Oshikanlu was awarded an Honorary Doctorate in Health and Social Care at London South Bank University, London

== Career ==
Oshikanlu worked within the National Health Service initially working as a Staff Nurse in 1996, she then developed her career with posts as a Midwife and then as a Health Visitor. Her roles took her across London, from West Middlesex to Tower Hamlets and south to Lewisham. She gained expertise in delivering secondary and community healthcare services in the public, independent and voluntary sectors. She is committed to delivering equity, social justice, trauma-informed approaches to care and has spent much of her career working with marginalised communities to reduce health inequalities and improve life outcomes

She worked as a community midwife and later specialised in HIV midwifery. She was one of the first Family Nurses on the Family Nurse Partnership programme in England, a nurse-led intensive home-visiting programme for pregnant teenagers and teenage parents

After leaving the NHS she set up a private practice on Harley Street supporting women to enjoy pregnancy without fear. She was a founding director of the charity NU Social Health 2010–2013. In 2012, she published 'Tune In to your Baby: : Because Babies Don't Come With an Instruction Manual', a holistic self-help parenting book promoting maternal and infant health. She also developed the Female Genital Mutilation (FGM) pathway for the Department of Health for health visitors and school nurses.

From 2010 she has been executive director at Goal Mind Limited providing coaching services to support senior and executive health leaders and social entrepreneurs.

In 2019 Oshikanlu pursued a Churchill Fellowship that focused on employing trauma-informed care to address Adverse Childhood Experiences

From 2021 she has also been executive director at Abule CIC working as a Nurse Entrepreneur. Here her projects have focused on improving services for marginalised people to reduce disparities in health outcomes, such as parenting programmes for pregnant teenagers and teenage parents in socially deprived London boroughs.

== Advocacy ==
Oshikanlu was a trustee for the charity Nu Social Health Organisation 2010–2013; a member of the Chief Nursing Officer (United Kingdom) BME advisory group; and a member of The Nigerian Healthcare Professionals UK Awards Committee 2019;

She has created an online website that collected and shares lived experiences of over 380 nurses and midwives from around the world 'Nurses and Midwives Talk'

Oshikanlu has been a committed advocate of anti-racism in nursing, in 2024 being part of the Royal College of Nursing anti-racism working group

== Awards and honours ==
Oshikanlu was appointed a Member of the Order of the British Empire (MBE) in the New Year 2019 Honours List as an Ambassador for the Health Visiting Profession and for services to Community Nursing, Children and Families

She was made an Honorary Doctor of London South Bank University (Health and Social Care) in 2019

She was awarded fellowships including of the Faculty of Nursing and Midwifery Royal College of Surgeons in Ireland in 2023; the American Academy of Nursing in 2023; the Royal Society for Public Health in 2022; the Royal Society of Arts in 2019; the Royal College of Nursing in 2017; and the Institute of Health Visiting in 2014. She was named a Churchill Fellow in 2019 and a Queen's Nurse (Queen's Nursing Institute in 2012

Oshikanlu was the recipient of awards including: BATON Awards – Lord Hastings Integrity Award 2020; Nursing Times Diversity and Inclusion Champion 2022; DIVAS of Colour Awards Health Professional Woman of The Year 2019; The CA Awards (Creativity & Arts Award), Best Coach/Mentor 2018; We Are The City Rising Star Champion, Gender Champion 2017; Nigerian Nurses Association UK, Recognition Award 2017; Women4Africa Recognition Award 2017; The Nigerian Achievers Awards, Outstanding Entrepreneur Award 2016; Nursing Times Leaders List 2015; Health Service Journal BME Pioneers List 2014; The Queen's Nursing Institute's Queen Elizabeth The Queen Mother Award for Outstanding Service to Community Nursing 2014; Community Practitioner and Health Visitor Association, Community Practitioner of the Year Award 2014
