= Barbara Stilwell =

British nurse, researcher and academic

Barbara Stilwell FRCN is a British nurse, researcher and academic, currently the executive director of the Nursing Now Global campaign and based in the United Kingdom, who has held various high-level positions at the Geneva headquarters of the World Health Organization's Human Resources Department.

A native of Liverpool, Dr Stilwell has worked with the Liverpool Associates for Tropical Health since September 2006. Before that, from 1998 to 2006, she worked with the WHO in health systems development, co-authoring the WHO's 2006 Health Report, which was to collect and analyse data regarding the impact of migrants on health systems in developing countries. She was one of the first nurse practitioners in the UK, educated there and in the United States. She practised in underserved areas of Africa, Australasia and the Caribbean. From 1982 to 1990 she had several appointments as a research fellow in nursing studies.

In 1991 she became a principal lecturer at the Institute of Advanced Nursing Education at the Royal College of Nursing. She was made a Fellow of the Royal College of Nursing in 1994.

From 1995 to 1997, as the RCN's Programme Director, she advised at government level on health care issues. After a short time at the Expanded Programme for Immunisation at the WHO, she joined the Human Resources for Health Department in 1998.

From 2010 to 2018 she was based in the United States at Chapel Hill, North Carolina's LATH/Capacity Project. She was named as Director of Technical Leadership for Intrahealth. In July 2018 she was appointed executive director of Nursing Now.
