= International Women's Society =

Organization in Nigeria

The International Women's Society (IWS) in Lagos, Nigeria is a Nigerian women's organization. The IWS was founded in 1957.

== History ==
Remi Doherty assumed office as IWS's first president in 1957.

Aduke Jaiyeola Alakija, Oyinkansola Abayomi, Adetokunbo Ademola, and Charles Modupe Norman-Williams became the first set of Trustees of the organization on 5th July 1960.

== Development and Management ==
The IWS Day Nursery was established in 1961.

The Lagos University Teaching Hospital (LUTH) Library was established in 1978.

The IWS Skills Acquisition Center was established in 1997. To date the Center has trained 3,500 students.

The IWS Widows Trust Fund was started in 1998.Over 2,500 widows have accessed the fund.

The Scholarship Scheme was started in 2004 to provide educational support. Over 1,600 pupils have used the program.

The IWS Social Services is an orphanage established in 2010 in Ijebu Ode, Ogun State.

The Society is managed by an annually elected executive committee headed by the President and Trustees appointed based on their contributions.

The International Women's Society supports charitable activity in Nigeria. It provides for the less privileged, financially supports widows, and helps women gain skills enabling their productive independence.

== Presidents ==
The IWS elects a new president each year. Notable past presidents include

- 1960: Aduke Alakija
- 1961: Kofo Ademola
- 1973: Grace Guobadia.
- 1981: Adetoun Bailey
- 1989: Phebean Ogundipe
- 2010: Ekuah Akinsanya.
- 2017: Ego Boyo.
- 2018: Abimbola Bawaallah.
- 2019: Nkoli Obi-Ogbolu.
- 2020: Ibiwunmi Akinnola.
