= Niall Dickson =

Journalist and health executive

Niall Forbes Ross Dickson CBE (born 5 November 1953) was chair of East Kent Hospitals University Foundation Trust between April 2021 and December 2023. He was chief executive of the NHS Confederation, between February 2017 and October 2020.

From 2010 to 2016, he was chief executive and registrar of the General Medical Council (GMC), and led the International Association of Medical Regulatory Authorities (IAMRA) until 2016. Previously, Dickson was chief executive of the King’s Fund, from 2004 to 2009, after a career in journalism.

== Early life ==
He was born in Scotland and educated at Glasgow Academy, Edinburgh Academy and then the University of Edinburgh.

== Career ==
=== Journalism ===
He was the editor of the Nursing Times from 1983 to 1988.

He worked at the BBC for 15 years, joining as health correspondent in 1988 and progressing to the position of social affairs editor for BBC News from 1995 to 2003. As social affairs editor he was responsible for around 80 journalists and his producer was Laura Kuenssberg.

=== Management ===
He was Chief Executive of the King's Fund from 2004 to 2009.

In January 2010, he was appointed as Chief Executive and registrar of the General Medical Council. He took up the post of chair of the IAMRA in 2014, for a three-year term of office.

Dickson was appointed Commander of the Order of the British Empire (CBE) in the 2017 Birthday Honours for services to patient safety.
