= Monday Market =

Marketplace in Maiduguri, Borno State, Nigeria

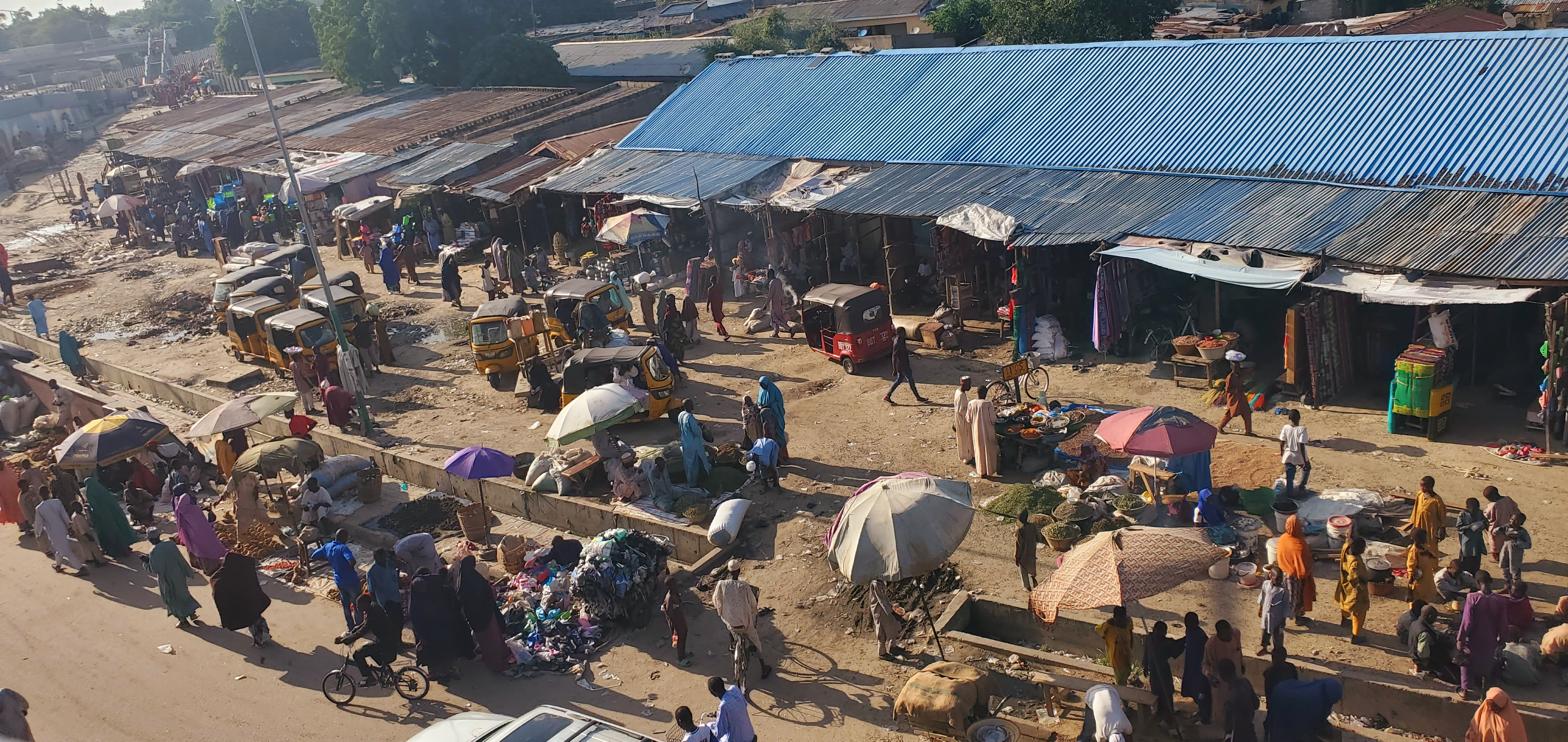
- Location: Maiduguri; 11.836°N 13.1534°E
- Opening date: 1970
- Interactive map of Monday Market

Monday Market is the largest and most significant marketplace in Maiduguri, Borno State, Nigeria.

== History and establishment ==
The Maiduguri Monday Market established in the early 1970s; it was created to support the growing commercial activities in Maiduguri. Initially located in Budum, the market was later relocated to its current site, which became a major commercial hub for northeastern Nigeria and neighboring countries such as Chad, Niger, and Cameroon. Following a devastating fire in 1979, the market was rebuilt and officially commissioned in August 1985 by Major-General Abubakar Waziri. It features approximately 20,000 shops and facilities, making it one of the largest markets in northern Nigeria at the time.

== 1979 fire ==
The 1979 Monday Market Fire was a devastating fire outbreak that completely destroyed the Monday Market in Maiduguri, Nigeria. The market was rebuilt and expanded, and reopened in 1985 under the administration of Major-General Abubakar Waziri.

== 2023 fire ==
A major fire outbreak occurred on February 26, 2023 at the Monday Market. The fire, which started around 2:00 AM, destroyed approximately 13,000 shops, affecting the livelihoods of over 20,000 traders.
