= Indigenous midwifery practices in Africa =

This is an article on Indigenous practices in Africa

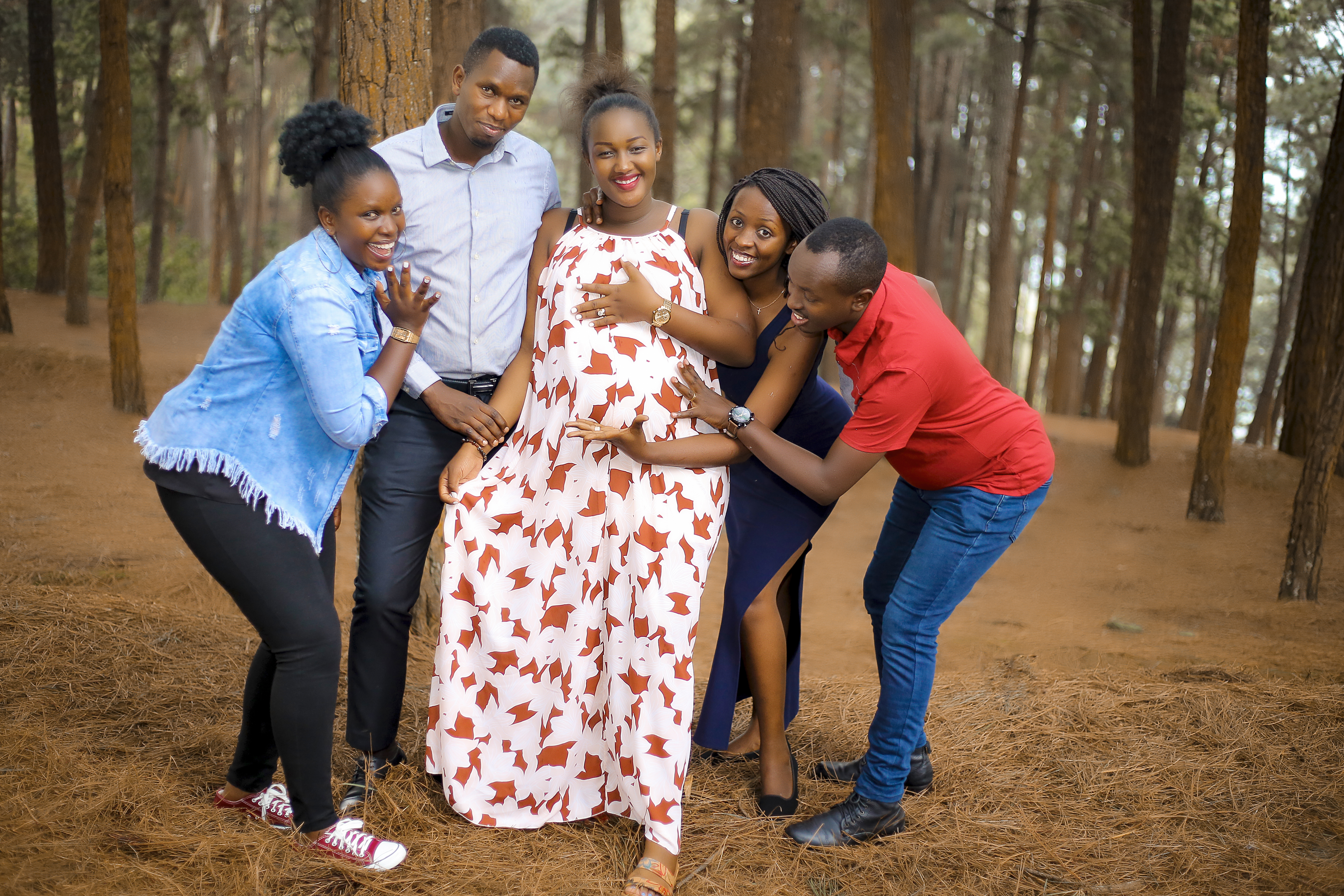
A picture of an African pregnant woman

Indigenous Midwifery Practices in Africa consists of the entirety of practices that are based on community maternal systems and African ancestral wisdom or knowledge. Before the advent of hospital based maternal care, most communities in Africa relied on birth assistants and midwives to help pregnant women give birth. This was usually done with the help of the woman's relatives such as the husband, mother in law, and grandparents. It is still largely practiced in many countries today.

== Background ==
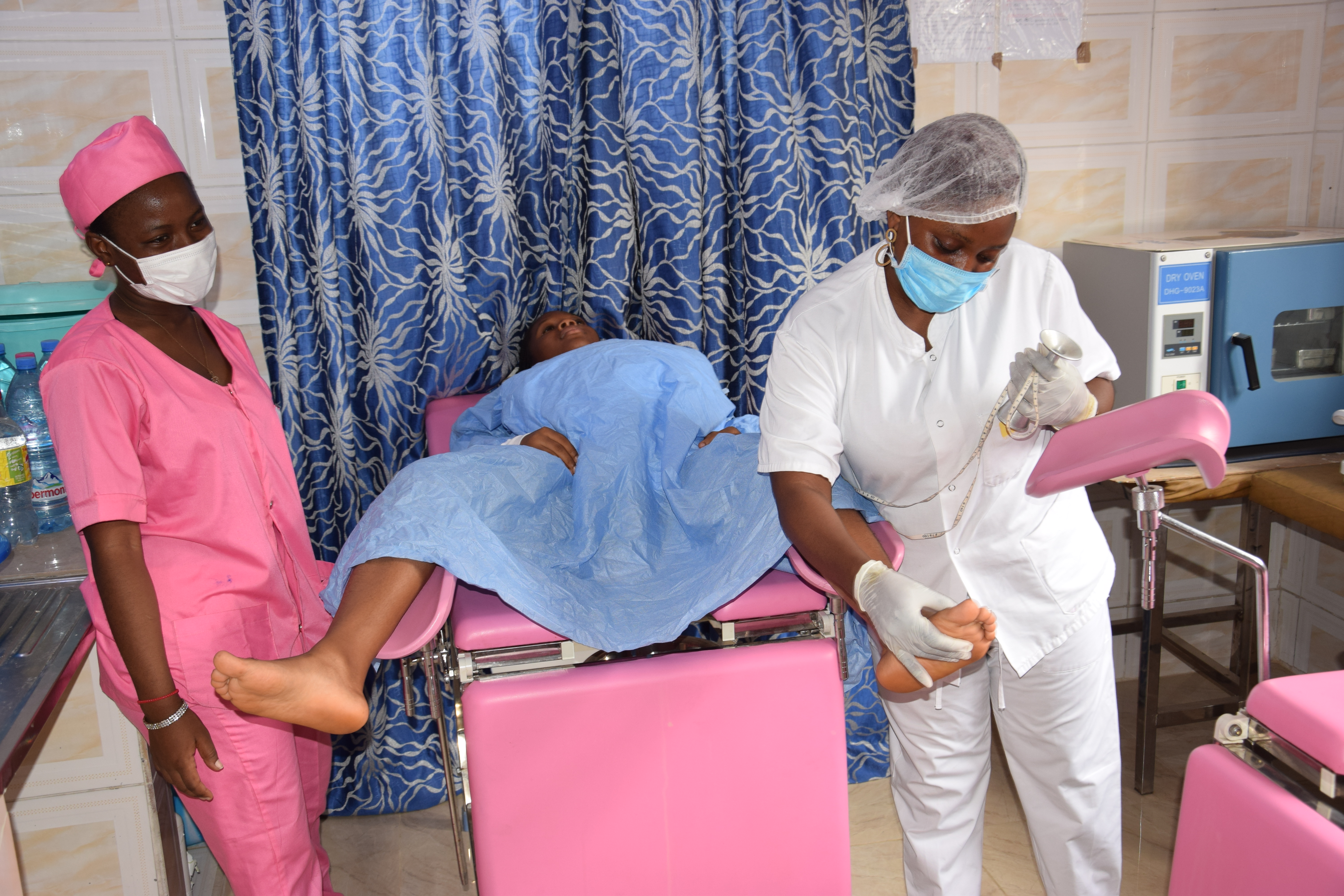
Midwives in Africa examining a pregnant woman

The WHO defines a traditional birth attendant/midwife as an individual who assists pregnant women during childbirth and who initially acquired the skill of delivery by conducting births herself or through apprenticeship.

== Key practices ==
In Africa, children are often highly valued as a symbol of wealth, lineage posterity, and retirement investment. When a woman is pregnant, the traditional diagnosis starts by reporting to a mother in law or relative. This relative notices a missed menstrual cycle and changes in the female's appearance or behavior, such as nausea or vomiting. Then the birth attendants are informed, and they estimate the pregnancy using the full moon. The pregnant female is expected to deliver after the ninth moon. The birth attendants also monitor the fetus with a horn that resembles the modern fetoscope. In addition, the pregnant female is given some medicinal herbs usually made from plants, animal products, fish, clay soil, and metal. These herbs help her to feel connected to her roots. Some herbs, like bitter leaf, are widely consumed by females across Africa, and it is known to fight against anemia and malaria. In the third trimester, some herbs like the AmaZulu, taken by pregnant women in South Africa, help with the induction of labor.^{{Failed verification}} Prenatal beliefs are common practices in Africa, as it is believed to be a very sensitive time. Sexual intercourse restriction during the second and third trimesters is a common practice. There are food beliefs in different parts of Africa. In Kenya, an expecting mother is made to abstain from eggs and meat. In Southern Africa, pregnant women abstain from fish. In Western Africa, expecting mothers are not allowed to eat snails, eggs, okra, and fatty foods.

During labor, the traditional birth attendant cleans the hut and has clean clothes available. While practices differ, the births usually take place in the house of the expectant mother, the expecting mother's maternal home, or the traditional birth attendant's hut. In Ethiopia, the birth takes place on a stone to symbolize the mother's hard work. The pregnant woman is given herbal medicine to prepare for labor. The pregnant woman is often told not to make her labor known to prevent evil spirits. During the first stage of labor, the birth attendant notes that labor has started. These birth attendants conduct vaginal examinations to check if the membrane is intact or has ruptured and if the cervix is dilated. Pain relief is given through herbal medications or massages using butter by the birth attendants. At the second stage of labor, the cervix reaches full dilation of 10 cm (3.9 in). Birthing positions vary based on the country, and they include the semi-sitting position, upright position, squatting, kneeling, all-fours position, and left lateral position.

After the delivery of the baby, the placenta is expected to be delivered within 5 minutes. In Ghana, the practice of delayed cord clamping to free the baby from the spirits is common. The pregnant women are given bottles to blow, which helps with the delivery of the placenta. The placenta is often buried, burned, or discarded in the river. In Botswana, females are given herbal medications which induce rapid labor in 3 hours. In some other countries, the husband of a pregnant woman may be asked not to tie a belt around his waist to prevent prolonged labor. The after-birth period starts and extends until the female has her first menstrual period after birth, and it is between six to twelve weeks from the African perspective. In addition, birth attendants know different ways of managing after-birth complications, such as monitoring the birth mother's body for abnormal changes and subinvolution.

== Efforts ==
It is crucial for healthcare professionals to develop synergistic relationships with indigenous midwives in Africa to reduce maternal mortality rates.
