= Kofoworola Abeni Pratt =

20th-century Nigerian nurse; first black Chief Nursing Officer of Nigeria

Chief Kofoworola Abeni Pratt Hon. FRCN
- Born: 1915; Lagos, Nigeria Protectorate
- Died: 18 June 1992 (aged 76–77); Lagos, Nigeria
- Occupation: Nurse
- Known for: First Nigerian born Chief Nursing Officer in Nigeria

Chief Kofoworola Abeni Pratt Hon. FRCN (née Scott, 1915 – 18 June 1992) was a Nigerian nurse who was one of the first notable black nurses to work in Britain's National Health Service. She subsequently became vice-president of the International Council of Nurses and the first black Chief Nursing Officer of Nigeria, working in the Federal Ministry of Health.

== Early life ==
Pratt was born in Lagos, Nigeria as the second of four children of Augustus Alfred Scott and Elizabeth Omowumi Scott (née Johnson). Her paternal great-grandfather was Chief Taiwo Olowo, a wealthy Yoruba nobleman. Her family was Anglican and she attended St John's Secondary School and CMS Girls School, Lagos. She passed the Cambridge senior school certificate in 1933 and then studied to be a teacher at the United Missionary College in Ibadan, after her father discouraged her from her wish to be a nurse. From 1936 to 1940, she taught at the CMS Girls School.

On 3 January 1941, she married Eugene Samuel Oluremi (Olu) Pratt, a pharmacist for the civil service. Her husband was posted in Enugu, Warri and Forcados, so the couple moved around. Their first son died in infancy and their second son, Babatunde, was born in Lagos in 1943. Her husband moved to London the following year to receive British medical qualifications. Their third child, Olufemi, was born in London in 1952.

== Career ==
In August 1946, Pratt moved to England to study nursing at the Nightingale School at St Thomas' Hospital, in London. Her son was left with foster parents while she attended the St Thomas’s Preliminary Training School. During her time at the hospital, Pratt experienced racial discrimination, when a patient refused to be treated by a black nurse. She was active in the West African Students' Union, an association of students from various West African countries who were studying in the United Kingdom, and which, in 1942, had called for the independence of Britain's West African colonies. Pratt passed her preliminary state exams in 1948 and her finals in 1949, qualifying as a State Registered Nurse on 25 November 1949. It was unusual for a married woman to be allowed to take up nursing at that time.

Pratt is often incorrectly cited as being the first qualified black nurse to work for the NHS. It seems this first appeared in her biography by Justus A. Akinsanya and was then repeated. Recent research shows that black nurses worked in the United Kingdom prior to the founding of the NHS in 1948, such as Annie Brewster and Omo-Oba Adenrele Ademola. By 1948 trained black nurses predating Pratt's qualification in 1949, were working for the NHS; however their stories are under-researched and have only recently come to light such as Lulu Coote. Pratt broke through many barriers in her lifetime; she may well have been the first black student at the Nightingale School for Nurses and later became the first Nigerian-born Chief Nursing Officer in Nigeria.

After qualification, she trained in midwifery at the Anglican Sisters of St John Clinic, receiving a certificate in 1950. The following year, she received a tropical nursing certificate from the Hospital for Tropical Medicine, St Pancras. In 1952, she completed the Royal College of Nursing ward sister course with a grant from the Nightingale Fund and then worked as a staff nurse for Evelina Children’s Hospital of Guy’s Hospital. In 1953, she returned to St Thomas' Hospital as a part-time charge nurse.

=== Return to Nigeria ===
Pratt returned to Nigeria in 1954, after four years working for the NHS. Although she was initially denied a post as ward sister – a position only open at the time for British expatriates – she got a position at the University College Hospital in Ibadan with the support of her colleagues at St Thomas' Hospital. When she arrived, she discovered that her accommodation was in a separate block than her British expatriate colleagues and that the professor of medicine would not let her work on the ward when he learned that she was Nigerian. However the Matron of the hospital overturned that decision and Pratt was moved to the medical ward at Adeoyo Hospital.

The new hospital was still under construction and Pratt imposed new standards for hygiene, care and nutrition and reformed the administration of the ward. She was promoted to administrative sister in 1955 and the following year, she returned to London to study for a diploma in hospital nursing administration from the Royal College of Nursing. In 1959, she travelled to the United States, Puerto Rico, and Jamaica on a Carnegie Grant to gain broader nursing experience.

In March 1961, she became the deputy matron of the University College Hospital, Ibadan and in January 1964 she became matron. Pratt was the first Nigerian to hold that position. She created a school of nursing at the University of Ibadan in 1965. Pratt was also a founder and leader of the Professional Association of Trained Nurses in Nigeria and founder and co-editor of the journal Nigerian Nurse.

Pratt was the chief nursing officer to the Federal Ministry of Health in Nigeria and then appointed Commissioner of Health for Lagos in the 1970s. In 1971, Pratt became the President of the National Council of Women's Societies in Nigeria.

In 1973 she was awarded the Florence Nightingale Medal by the International Committee of the Red Cross. The citation described her as a:

State Registered Nurse and Midwife. Certificate in Tropical Nursing. Teachers Diploma. Hospital Nursing Administration Certificate. Chief Nursing Officer, Federal Ministry of Health, Lagos.

The award was presented to her by the President of the Nigerian Red Cross Society, Sir Adetokunbo Ademola, on 21 December 1973. In 1975, she was awarded a chieftaincy title – that of the Iya Ile Agbo of Isheri – for services to Nigeria. In 1979 she was made an honorary fellow of the Royal College of Nursing.

In 1973, she was invited by the military governor of Lagos, Brigadier Mobolaji Johnson, to join his Cabinet as, in effect, Minister of Health (the title was “Commissioner of Health”). In the office, she succeeded in achieving reforms for doctors, nurses and in public health. Her term of office ended in 1975 with another military coup.

She died on 18 June 1992.
