= Tropical nursing =

Nursing specialty

Tropical nursing is a nursing specialty predominantly undertaken in tropical and subtropical regions. These regions generally have underdeveloped health services and a lack of essential healthcare staff, including registered nurses and midwives.

== Recognition of the DipTN ==
Medecins Sans Frontieres, Voluntary Services Overseas (VSO) and the British Red Cross are some of the international agencies that recommend the DipTN.
