= Nursing Times =

British medical magazine

- August 2023 issue
- Editor: Steve Ford
- Categories: Health, Healthcare, Nursing
- Frequency: Monthly in Print and Daily Online
- Format: A4
- Circulation: 22,000 Subscribers (Print and Online)
- Publisher: Metropolis International
- Founder: Macmillan & Co Ltd
- Founded: 1905
- First issue: 06-May-1905
- Company: Metropolis International
- Country: United Kingdom
- Based in: Harmsworth House, 15 Bouverie St, Temple, London, EC4Y 8DP
- Language: English
- Website: www.nursingtimes.net
- ISSN: 0954-7762
- OCLC: 316299007

Nursing Times is a website and monthly magazine for nurses, which is published in the United Kingdom. It covers original nursing research and best practice for nurses at all stages in their career, as well as daily news, opinion and other information relevant to the nursing profession.

In 2025, Nursing Times ceased its print edition and went online-only. At that time the magazine had over 20,000 subscribers, with around 100 print-only, 11,900 print and digital, with the rest digital only.

== History and profile ==
Nursing Times is the largest nursing website outside of the US. The majority of articles it publishes are either on nursing news or clinical subjects. For example, it contains a clinical archive of over 5,000 double-blind peer reviewed articles on all aspects of nursing. It also hosts an opinion section, long reads, career development information, clinical supplements and an innovation hub.

In addition, Nursing Times supports continuing professional development and work towards revalidation through its CPD Zone. The zone comprises around 20 user-friendly online learning units on fundamental aspects of nursing, clinical articles with online assessments for bitesize CPD, clinical articles with discussion handouts for participatory CPD, and a personal e-portfolio to store CPD and revalidation evidence.

Founded by Macmillan and Co Ltd, the first edition of Nursing Times was published on Saturday 6 May 1905. The print edition of Nursing Times is currently published on a monthly basis, having been published weekly until January 2017. As well as the 2017 relaunch, Nursing Times underwent a previous major redesign in March 2009.

Nursing Times has regularly run campaigns on issues affecting nurses including most recently Time Out for Training (2008), A Seat on the Board (2010–2011), Speak Out Safely (2013–2014) and Covid-19: Are You OK (2020–).

In 2018, Nursing Times was inducted into the International Academy of Nursing Editors’ Nursing Journal Hall of Fame. It was named Special Interest Magazine of the Year at the 2019 Periodical Press Association Awards (PPAs).

From July 2004 to July 2005 Nursing Times sold nearly 72,166 copies. The magazine had a circulation of 30,923 copies in 2008.

It was one of 13 titles acquired from Ascential (formerly Emap) by Metropolis International in a £23.5m cash deal, announced on 1 June 2017. Metropolis has retained the name emap for its B2B brands business, including Nursing Times.

In April 2023, the Nursing Times Archive was launched, featuring digitised versions of print issues of Nursing Times published between 1905 and 1987.

The Nursing Times brand also produces a range of events and conferences. These include the flagship Nursing Times Awards and Student Nursing Times Awards, which is the only awards to solely recognise nurse education.

The Nursing Times Awards were launched in 1990 and, as of 2021, have 25 categories covering a wide range of nursing specialties from mental health to clinical research.

The Student Nursing Times Awards were launched in 2011 and, as of 2021, have 21 categories for students lecturers, practice supervisors, universities, NHS and private organisations.

Other events include the Nursing Times Workforce Summit & Awards, which was launched in 2018, the Patient Flow Forum, which ran in 2020 and 2021, the Nursing Times Digital Forum and the Nursing Times Clinical Skills Forum, plus regular Nursing Times Careers Live jobs fairs throughout the year and webinars on a range of subjects.

== History of Nursing Times ==
=== Nursing Times between 1905 and 1910 ===
Nursing Times did not so much burst on the scene as tap on the door and wait to be invited in. Publishing was a genteel business in 1905, and this was very much the tone of the early Nursing Times.

The editor for the first 21 years was Swanhilde Bulan, a German-born journalist. Preferring anonymity, she was never identified on Nursing Times’ pages.

In the first issue, which cost a penny, Ms Bulan emphasised the independence that is still cherished today. There was ‘no shadowy personality “behind” it,’ she said, and Nursing Times would report news without bias. This was an allusion to the fact its competitors promoted particular political views.

A journal that promised to avoid squabbles was an attractive proposition. Responding to critics who suggested that lack of opinion would render Nursing Times ‘colourless’ the launch issue stated: ‘[If] we can avoid bias, bitterness and personalities, we are well content to be “colourless”.’ However, Nursing TimesNursing Times believed it did have colour to offer, but that would be ‘of the right sort … expert articles, interesting experiences, reliable and exhaustive news, and helpful interchanges of opinion.’ It would also cater for ‘the human being and the woman as well as the nurse’.

From its early years, Nursing Times kept nurses up to date on professional news and clinical issues. It also gave them a forum to express their views. An article in 1908, for example, complained about an aspect of mental health nursing: ‘No duty lays more stress upon the mental nurse than her attendance at the dances organised for patients … Many of the delusions of the insane are of persecutions or of victimisations for which nurses or doctors are blamed, and it is essential that the careful nurse will notice the facial expressions of her charges as a fracas in the ball-room is greatly dreaded.’

The concerns of different branches including district nurses, private nurses, school nurses and fever nurses were reported, including pay and conditions as well as clinical developments. Midwives had their own section. Matters of wider relevance ranged from national news such as the introduction of old age pensions to overseas nursing news. The journal also discussed women’s issues such as women’s role in war and kept a close watch on the progress towards full voting rights for women.

The clinical articles submitted by nurse authors focused on the major health issues of the day. Many of these would be unfamiliar to nurses today, such as infection control in scarlet fever or typhoid, sea-water injection treatment and important points in rectal feeding.

Readers’ wider interests were also catered for with holiday reports, recipes and information on modern hobbies such as photography and cycling.

=== Nursing Times during 1911–20 ===
Recognising the practical nature of its readers, in 1912 Nursing Times organised one of its earliest competitions – for inventions and ideas. The journal had a stall at the London Nursing and Midwifery Exhibition, on which it planned to display inventions by nurses, midwives, masseuses and health visitors.

In order to attract submissions for the exhibition, it offered prizes for the best entries in two classes. Class I, was for ‘any invention not yet on the market or any clever device or idea’ and had a first prize of £10 and a gold medal, while the first prize for Class II (any invention already on the market) was £5 and a gold medal.

The first congress of the Eugenics Society was held in 1912 with the aim of making the 20th century the one in which the eugenic ideal was accepted as part of the creed of civilisation. A report in Nursing Times pointed out that the subject was of interest to nurses because ‘they have forcibly brought before them in the shape of imbeciles, epileptics and other degenerate children, the result of the mating of the unfit’.

On 8 August 1914, Nursing Times devoted its editorial page to the solemn news that ‘the cloud which has lain over our country for the past week has now burst, and England is at war with Germany’. However, the issue moved briskly on to other important matters with a two-page report on the third annual Nursing Times Lawn Tennis Challenge Cup Competition, in which Guy’s Hospital trounced St Georges by 31 games to 26 in front of at least 500 spectators.

The war quickly became a major concern for Nursing Times, however, when it became apparent that it would not, as generally expected by most of the population, be over by Christmas. Nurses were suddenly thrown in at the deep end caring for air raid casualties at home and servicemen both at home and abroad, and the journal came into its own, supporting readers with clinical information as they struggled to develop new skills to deal with the kinds of major trauma most would never have encountered before.

Advertisers reflected the concerns of the time, with the Boots Pure Drug Company Limited advertising a new treatment for mustard gas burns, which was having ‘remarkable results in hospitals’. During the flu pandemic of 1918-19, help came from a surprising source – Oxo, apparently ‘Fortifies the System against Influenza Infection’.

Even in such serious times, however, Nursing Times never forgot its promise to cater for its readers’ interest as women as well as nurses. Lighter articles during the war years included advice on hair and hats (‘the safe rule is to follow the line of your head in dressing your hair’), and advice on how to make a bead bag (‘the bag of the moment … but, alas! Very expensive’).

=== Nursing Times during the 1920s ===
In the 1920s Nursing Times had changed little since its launch, and provided an eclectic mix of news, clinical information and articles of general interest and kept readers updated on professional issues.

However, true to form, when asked to give a lead in voting for the new council in 1924 it did not recommend individuals. Instead, it advised readers to ‘vote in those classes for the women they consider reliable, courageous and conscientious’.

Most authors were nurses, but doctors did contribute both clinical articles and their ideas on how nurses should conduct themselves. In 1925 George Steele-Perkins advised readers of their shortcomings in an article entitled ‘Nursing don’ts’. Dr Steele had the grace to admit readers may consider him ‘very rude and horrid’, but insisted those who wished to know their faults would not resent him. His main focus was on nurses’ comportment. He wrote: ‘Don’t be untidy… look as clean and pretty as you can… Don’t chatter – all women are born chatterers and therefore you start handicapped – but you are more than women, you are nurses.’

In 1926 Nursing Times became the official journal of the College of Nursing (now the RCN) – a relationship that lasted for more than 40 years. The same year saw the departure of editor Swanhilde Bulan after 21 years. Whether the two events are linked is not clear, but Ms Bulan certainly cherished Nursing Times’ independence.

The medical profession in the 1920s was slowly coming to accept that menstruation was not an illness, according to a Nursing Times report of a BMA meeting in Bradford. ‘Not only could baths and exercise be continued with impunity throughout the normal period, but by such a regimen dysmenorrhoea was usually relieved if not dispelled.’

Clinical articles included the treatment of encephalitis lethargica, a disease that had spread around the world leaving patients with a range of neurological symptoms including enduring coma in severe cases. The cause was never established and no further epidemics have been reported.

Nursing Times continued to publish fashion articles alongside its more serious content. We can only hope this did not influence the nurse at ‘a certain Poor Law institution’ who resigned because she objected to her new uniform.

As an editorial commented, ‘To abandon her chosen calling for so frivolous a reason seems to show she had quite failed to grasp that willing response to discipline is an essential duty.’

=== Nursing Times during the 1930s ===
After 35 years in which its appearance had barely changed, Nursing Times updated its look in 1939. The staid front covers filled with long editorial comment and full-page advertisements were replaced by a black and white photograph and blue surround.

An editorial comment in 1932 argued against a paper presented at the National Association for the Prevention of Tuberculosis conference. The speaker had claimed that recreation and lack of sleep put young people at risk of TB. Nursing Times was unconvinced. ‘An occasional late night spent at the cinema or in the dance-hall hurts nobody – on the contrary it supplies a needed mental fillip.’

The journal also, rather surprisingly, came out in support of smokers. Although there had been early reports linking smoking with lung cancer, Nursing Times believed: ‘… it certainly does good to tuberculosis persons and diabetics’.

Clinical articles included advice on a perennial problem – bedsores (pressure ulcers). Even then the importance of frequent position changes was recognised to prevent the problem. For treatment the author recommended Metuvit, an Austrian preparation with impressive qualities. It was not painful to patients and could be applied to sores ‘which are inclined to be septic and have delicate surrounding tissue’ resulting in rapid progress in all cases.

The journal made more use of photography inside. A double-page spread in 1939 headed ‘Cripples at the seaside’ showed boys with disabilities having fun at their seaside home. Fun in those days consisted of racing on shingle beaches, having lessons in what appeared to be force nine gales and being put to bed on the promenade.

When the country went to war, Nursing Times played its part in motivating readers to volunteer for service. It acknowledged that being sent miles from home would cause difficulties, but pointed out that many people faced far worse. ‘All of us must do our part and face the possibility of losing our worldly goods, our financial stability and what is worse even our friends and relations, so that we may as individuals and as a nation keep our freedom and ideals.’

In addition to reporting on the war as it affected nurses Nursing Times published practical information such as a series on foreign phrases for nurses with continental patients. The articles gave French, German and Polish translations for a range of useful phrases including ‘I want to vomit’ and ‘my bandage is too tight’ and included a phonetic form.

Clinical articles also dealt with war-related problems such as enuresis and faecal incontinence among evacuee children. The article explained that the problem was due to ‘a fear, not a badness’’. Nurses should explain to the families with whom the children were staying that: ‘Under no circumstances should the children be punished as naughty and told that they are horrid Londoners who are only there on sufferance.’

=== Nursing Times during the 1940s ===
War brought new clinical challenges to health professionals – mainly in the shape of traumatic injuries they would rarely if ever see in peacetime. Like their medical colleagues nurses needed to learn quickly how to care for these injuries, and Nursing Times was on hand to support them with its clinical material.

An article in 1941 discussed the treatment of war burns, explaining the pathological processes involved in burn injuries and the shock precipitated in many severely burned patients. It also advised how to care for patients in primary shock: ‘Patients are often very apprehensive. They think they are going to die or be disfigured for life. A sympathetic, tactful and firm nurse will often quickly overcome these fears and enable the patient to get some sleep.’

Ever practical, Nursing Times also acknowledged the fact that war tends to result in rather more embarrassing problems, and ran a series on the venereal diseases. Perhaps to deter readers from going too wild on their rare nights out the article on syphilis warned sternly that the disease was not only transmitted through sexual intercourse but also ‘by other means, e.g. kissing, the deposition of infective secretion from mouth lesions on cups, glasses etc.’

Although nursing was still a strictly hierarchical profession in which matrons ruled hospitals on military lines, one radical matron questioned whether it had to be like this. In ‘Discipline – its uses and abuses’ she described some ‘regrettable examples’ of abuses – which were not exclusive to matrons. ‘The student nurse of six months can be quite a madam to her junior of three months. Within the last year I heard of a sister who reprimanded a nurse most severely for daring to ask her if she had recovered from a recent illness.’

On the week in which the NHS launched during July 1948, Nursing Times was clear that nurses would ‘in many people’s minds, be [ital] the service’, but acknowledged that many readers would see it as ‘a restrictive and controlling machine hampering their power and drive’.

Thankfully, those who were feeling hampered – or at least the ones who lived in London – could turn to Mary L Stollard for information on country pleasures in London. ‘Most of us nowadays have a whole or a half day at least once a week, and sometimes Sunday as well.’ What better way could a nurse find to regain her power and drive than to spend a few pence getting right away from bricks and mortar for a long lazy afternoon ‘picnicing [sic] on the grassy slopes amid the most lovely sylvan surroundings’?

=== Nursing Times during the 1950s ===
At the start of the decade Nursing Times reported on the RCN’s attempts to raise £500,000 to ensure finances for its service to provide further education and special preparation of trained nurses to become nurse teachers, managers and specialists of the future.

Nursing Times published a review of what had happened to the NHS after just two years, saying: ‘One of the first effects of the change-over was the increased demands made upon hospital out-patient departments and in some specialties waiting lists for admission to beds increased.’ It went on to explain the greatest burden of the NHS was being carried by GP services and said: ‘Probably 95% or more of the population are now registered with a general practitioner. Means and methods of helping the family doctor and supporting him in his work are badly needed. Nurses and auxiliary workers could be invaluable in relieving this need.’

Nursing Times was the magazine of choice for royalty as Queen Mary wrote in March 1950 to then RCN general secretary Frances Goodall saying she welcomed news that the college was to hold an annual celebration of founder’s day of the RCN. Queen Mary was interested in seeing a copy of the special issue of Nursing Times that was being produced to mark this occasion.

Nursing Times became available at newsagents for the first time in 1951 and its price rose by 50% to 6d (2.5p) and an average issue now contained 90 pages.

In 1957, Nursing Times editor Marjorie Wenger contributed to a lively debate over the role of nursing which had been discussed in The Lancet. She said that real nursing involved the ‘care of a patient as a whole person and is not necessarily confined to the bedside’.

The image of nursing in the 1950s still caught the public attention as it does now. In 1958, the Ministry of Health launched a training film about lifting that featured nurses dressed in swimming costumes so that the ‘movements and strains on the limbs are seen clearly’.

Nursing Times announced in January 1959 that it would award a travel bursary of £500 to a nurse who wishes to travel and study the issues of nurses in another country. Such a winner must be someone who had "already demonstrated her interest in and concern for the development of the nursing profession through activities in connection with the Royal College of Nursing or the Nursing Times".

Later that year printers’ strikes meant that the issues of Nursing Times in July had to be reduced to a short newsletter.

=== Nursing Times during the 1960s ===
A prophetic article was published in Nursing Times in 1960 by Claire Rayner, then an out-patient sister, who regretted the number of women forced to use backstreet abortionists. The solution, she proposed, was a change in the law ‘making performed therapeutic abortion available to these unhappy girls rather than allowing them to risk their lives in dirty back rooms, at the hands of a bungling amateur’. The Act making abortion legal was passed in 1967.

Nursing Times identified a crisis in nursing by the summer of 1961 and began a series on the subject during which MP Kenneth Robinson said frankly: Recruiting is too low, wastage too high and the present trend holds out little hope of improvement.’ Nursing Times was opposed to the lowering of the age for nurse training from 18 to 17, because it would ‘merely give rise to further exploitation of young people’ said an editorial in 1964.

Nursing Times inadvertently provided a good opportunity to examine the issue of nursing administration that same year. The RCN surveyed all such posts advertised in Nursing Times over a six-month period in 1964 and from replies of the 481 successful applicants, only 5% had a certificate in nursing administration and 1% had a ward sister’s certificate.

The Salmon report of 1966 provoked debate and division within the profession and Nursing Times was critical. Then editor Peggy Nuttall said: ‘Each grade, theoretically at least, will be capable of blocking communications either upwards or downwards and could cut off grade 10 from the patient in the ward and the nurse of student at his bedside.’

Nursing Times launched occasional papers in 1968 – articles ‘beyond the usual length in order that a subject may be explored more fully or in greater depth than is possible in the rest of the editorial pages’. Such a development helped move nursing towards evidence-based practice.

The magazine gave its full backing to the RCN’s Raise the Roof pay campaign of 1969. The magazine’s editorial of 13 November in that year said: ‘The campaign is not just one for economic rewards. It is a campaign, the success of which could affect every person in a long-stay hospital, every patient in an acute general hospital, and every citizen in the land who is a potential patient. This campaign must be supported by every nurse and by every member of the general public and by our legislators in parliament.’

=== Nursing Times during the 1970s ===
In January 1971, then Nursing Times editor Peggy Nuttall asked readers to call her up with their thoughts and opinions rather than send the usual letters and all because of a postal strike.

The UK joined the European Economic Community in January 1973. A Nursing Times editorial said: ‘As a profession, British nursing has much to give Europe. We have the chance to speak for ourselves and not to use doctors or lay administrators or civil servants as spokesmen. But our contribution will be minimised if professional nurses speak only English and have only the haziest notion of the workings of the NHS and of their own profession.’

The 1977 Save District Nursing campaign was a highly successful drive by Nursing Times to ensure district nurses received their own statutory committee in the new legislation that established the UKCC seven years later. More than 20,000 car stickers were sent out, many meetings took place around the UK and eventually the government bowed to pressure and agreed to the committee.

Nursing Times editor Alison Dunne provoked a storm in 1978 when she wrote about her poor treatment when having her wisdom teeth removed at hospital. Nursing Times received a deluge of letters about this, with many readers angry about a perceived criticism of nursing standards. Ms Dunne admitted later she had no idea this would touch such a nerve but argued nurses should be big enough to admit when standards were poor.

The first International Cancer Nursing Conference took place in London in 1978, a gathering of 1,400 cancer nurses from 28 different countries. Nursing Times backed the event and gave it full coverage.

Also in 1978, Nursing Times joined up with former travel company Project 67 to send groups of qualified nurses on three-month working holidays to Israel. The venture proved popular, but unfortunately for UK nurse staffing some of the travellers decided to stay in Israel.

The image of nurses to most people was represented in the television series Angels, which featured on the cover of Nursing Times in September 1979. The magazine ran an extensive feature detailing the behind-the-scenes of the making of the programme.

=== Nursing Times during the 1980s ===
Nursing Times decade started with a ‘Save It’ campaign aimed at nurses looking for ways to save the NHS money, so that more could be spent on better patient care.

This prompted many interesting suggestions including dispensing with nurses’ paper caps, reducing spending on advertising for nurses, and lists to be given to ward sisters with prices of all supplies and cheaper alternatives to them.

A new phenomenon was reported on in 1982 – the nurse practitioner – with a feature about pioneer Barbara Stilwell in Birmingham.

A Nursing Times feature entitle ‘AIDS – A 20th century plague?’ was published in 1983 and warned that the mysterious disease that was striking down gay men in the USA had arrived in the UK.

That same year Nursing Times went colour on its inside pages and featured a striking new logo.

Nursing Aid (1986) was a campaign with the aim of raising £100,000 for nursing and midwifery projects in the developing world. By the end of a year of many fund-raising events, the campaign netted £140,000. Also in 1986 the Nursing Times/3M National Nursing Awards were launched to reward skill and innovation in nursing.

Nursing Times ran an illuminating investigation into where the real shortages of nurses were around the country in January 1988. The article entitled Where Have All the Nurses Gone? stated that although regional and district health authorities knew how many nurses they have, they had no idea how many they should have. Unsurprisingly, the south of England had the most acute shortages. Of 14 regions contacted, only one was able to provide figures assessing how many staff they would need in the future for particular specialties.

In 1988 the joint Nursing Times and Department of Health and Social Security (DHSS) campaign ‘Recruit and Retain Nurses’ was launched in response to chronic nurse shortages. The campaign highlighted new ways of attracting applicants and set out to make sure existing nurses remained in the profession. An editorial said it would ‘tackle some of the longer term and deep-rooted issues that will help to shape the profession in the next decade and beyond.’

In the midst of nationwide industrial action taking place in 1988, a Nursing Times editorial by Niall Dickson said: ‘Action must involve not a few thousand but hundreds of thousands and, above all, it must be targeted at the government without so much as harming a hair on a single patient’s head.’

=== Nursing Times during the 1990s and early 2000s ===
The 1990s and 2000s saw Nursing Times run many campaigns. In 1992 Nursing Times launched the Mind Your Back campaign, calling for nurses to have the right to be protected from back injury caused by inappropriate lifting and for full implementation of new EC rules on manual handling. Up to 3,600 nurses were leaving their jobs every year because of back injuries, at a loss of 1.3 million working days. Nursing Times editor John Gilbert said: ‘The scandal of nurses leaving the profession in pain and with their lives and careers in tatters must end.’

Nursing Times launched Open Learning in 1991, the distance learning package for enrolled nurse conversion.

Another high-profile campaign was 1995’s ‘Nursing Times Says Nurses Need 3% Pay Up Now!’ This called for an across-the-board 3% pay hike rather than the 1% national award that employers could implement as a minimum. A major demonstration followed, nationwide protests and a survey of 1,000 members of the public showed that 90% of the population supported a 3% rise.

Later that decade the 1998 Stamp Out Violence campaign sought to reduce violence against nurses and led to official government reduction targets. By April 1999, then health secretary Frank Dobson announced for the first time that government would carry out and publish regular surveys to monitor the number of attacks on NHS staff, trusts were told they had to set targets for reducing violence and meet them, and there would be a cross-government drive to cut violence against NHS staff with national guidelines on assaults, covering prevention, publicity, prosecution and sentencing.

A MORI survey carried out in late 1999 by Nursing Times and the RCN about the public’s attitude to nurses revealed that, compared to the very same questions posed in a survey in 1984, nurses had an enhanced public image as better educated, more likely to challenge doctors, and more feisty when it came to campaigning on pay.

Early in the new millennium Nursing Times’ 2001 Save Nurses from Stalkers campaign was a response to new legislation allowing the public to demand nurses’ home addresses. This was widely branded as a ‘stalkers’ charter’ and 7,000 Nursing Times readers signed a petition demanding this part of the legislation be changed. The threat was removed as the final legislation said a nurse’s home address would not be published or given without their permission.

In 2004 Nursing Times ran a Fairness on Fees campaign to force the NMC to think again on its proposal to increase the three-year registration fee from £60 to £144. Around 13,000 nurses wrote to Nursing Times in support of the campaign and these were presented to the NMC. The fee rise was reduced to £129 as a result, an estimated saving of £10m for the nursing workforce.

== See also ==
- List of nursing journals
