= Elfrida O. Adebo =

Nigerian Professor of Nursing (1928–c.2004)

- Born: 1928; Ibadan
- Died: 2004 (aged 75–76)
- Citizenship: Nigeria
- Occupation: Nurse

Elfrida O. Adebo (née Olaniyan; 3 March 1928 – c. 2004) was a Nigerian nurse and academic. In 1984, she became the first professor of nursing in Nigeria.

== Life and career ==
Adebo was born in Abeokuta, Ogun State, on 3 March 1928. She started her nursing career in London, training as a staff nurse and midwife at St Mary's Hospital, London in 1957-58. In 1959 she returned to Nigeria to work as a Public Health Nurse in Ibadan. She gained a D.P.H. in Nursing in 1961, and a Bachelor of Nursing in 1962. After briefly working as an instructor at the School of Hygiene in Ibadan, she became a lecturer at the University of Ibadan. Joining the Department of Nursing in October 1967, she became acting Head of Department by 1970. From 1976 to 1980 she studied at the University of North Carolina at Chapel Hill. In 1980, she was appointed Head of Department at the Department of Nursing in Ibadan.

In 1973, she was a member of the Experts Advisory Panel on Nursing for the World Health Organization. She was also a consultant to Nigeria's Federal Ministry of Health.

Adebo died around 2004.

== Works ==
- (with Ann C. Chokrieh) 'The measurement and comparison of the democratic versus autocratic attitudinal change of the B.Sc. (Nursing) students of the University of Ibadan during the 1972/3 academic session'. International Journal of Nursing Studies, Vol. 13, Issue 2 (1976), pp.103-113
- (with Ann C. Chokrieh) 'Evaluation of nursing knowledge and skills in Nigeria'. International Nursing Review, Vol. 24, No. 2 (March-April 1977), pp.55-60.
- Universities, nurses and nursing: an inaugural lecture delivered at University of Ibadan in 1983. Ibadan, Nigeria: University of Ibadan, 1990. ISBN 978-9781212062
