= Peggy Nuttall =

British nurse journalist (1917–2008)

Peggy Nuttall OBE OStJ FRCN
- Born: 1917
- Died: 2008 (aged 90–91)
- Occupation: nursing journalist
- Employer: Nursing Times

Peggy Dina Nuttall OBE OStJ FRCN (1917–2008), as editor and later director of Nursing Times was one of the most influential nurses of the 20th century.

== Early career ==
Nuttall was born on 8 December 1917 in Romford, Essex.

Nuttall began her career working in a library with a certificate from the Library Association. She soon moved to study physiotherapy at the Royal London Hospital where she qualified in 1940 and where she practiced between 1940 and 1943. She moved to Guy's Hospital where she was awarded a teacher's certificate at the Chartered Society of Physiotherapy in 1943.

During World War II Nuttall was evacuated from London to the Royal Infirmary of Edinburgh for a few months. In 1945 she returned to The London Hospital as a teacher of physiotherapy and became an examiner for the Chartered Society of Physiotherapy.

In 1951 Nuttall began her training at the Florence Nightingale Faculty of Nursing and Midwifery of St Thomas' Hospital London. She then completed Part I Midwifery Training at the East End Maternity Hospital. She graduated top of her class with honours in 1955. Nuttall went on to hold nursing posts as charge nurse at the Royal Waterloo Hospital for Children and Women and posts as staff nurse, ward sister, and in 1957 a year as senior night assistant at St Thomas’ Hospital.

== Nursing Times ==
Nuttall's home situation meant she had to 'live out', prompting her to move from hospital nursing into nursing journalism from 1958 where within a year she became Clinical Editor of Nursing Times. She was only the third nurse to be an editor for the journal, a post she held for 13 years 1959–1973. In 1958 she wrote an insightful article Ink on My Fingers describing her role as a pioneering female-nurse-editor in The Nightingale Fellowship Journal.

Her tenure included the journal's change from being the Royal College of Nursing official journal to being an independent title under Macmillan Publishers when she became director. While Editor, Nuttall made significant changes, such as publishing articles not just by doctors but by nurses, and encouraging specialist research though the occasional papers series which she introduced. In 1973 Nuttall became associate director at MacMillan, editorial director at the Nursing Times where as well as providing strategic direction she continued to edit their occasional papers series. In 1975 she retired from active duties. During her time at the Nursing Times Nuttall voiced strong opinions on the profession through her regular Gadfly column. In her time as Editor she more than doubled the Nursing Times' circulation.

In 1977 to mark her retirement, the Nursing Times announced the 'Peggy Nuttall bursary', an annual bursary to enable a nurse, or nurses, to undertake post-basic studies in clinical nursing.

During her tenure Nuttall continued to be active outside the Nursing Times. In 1973 she was noted as being a Council member of the Royal College of Nursing and of St Christopher's Hospice. She was active in the Nightingale Fellowship (St Thomas nurses' league), including a role on their executive committee when she took on the editorship of their Nightingale Fellowship Journal 1962 to 1984.

== Retirement ==
By 1984 Nuttall had taken a post as Editor of the International Council of Nurses (ICN) Review in Geneva reflecting her longstanding interest and activity in international nursing. In 1976 she took up the Nursing Officer position for the British Red Cross London branch. She served as a member of the Lambeth, Southwark and Lewisham Area Health Authority and was involved in the 1979 commission in the area. Along with several University of London diplomas in social studies, religious knowledge, archaeology and the history of art, Nuttall studied for a BA in Art History with the Open University in 1977. In 1985 she was made vice-president of the Nightingale Fellowship, whose council she had been on since 1959. In the 1980s Nuttall was one of the first trustees of the Florence Nightingale Museum.

== Awards ==
Nuttall was given British Red Cross life membership in 1973, and presented with the British Red Cross Society's Certificate of Honour and Badge early in 1974. She was appointed Officer of the Order of the British Empire (OBE) in the 1977 New Year Honours and Officer of the Order of Saint John (chartered 1888) (OStJ) in 1977. In 1980 Nuttall was awarded Fellowship of the Royal College of Nursing, (FRCN).

== Death ==
Nuttall died on 5 October 2008 in Gerrard's Cross, Buckinghamshire.
