= Intrahealth (UK) =

Intrahealth is a provider of primary Care services based in Durham, England.

They run 18 GP surgeries, 5 Community Pharmacy services and a range of NHS Community Services including anticoagulation (warfarin), immunisation / vaccination services and medicines management.

Intrahealth was one of a number of companies founded by GPs cited by the NHS Support Federation in a report described a process of commercialisation masked by some providers being referred to as ‘GP-led', when in reality, many described in this way have a commercial focus, with ‘profit-making intent and a traditional corporate management structure'.

In 2011 when Clinical Commissioning Groups were first proposed the company planned to develop a commissioning consortium of non-neighbouring practices covering its more than 40,000 registered patients. According to its plan “This proposal… challenges the notion of working in geographical clusters and opts for a model based on working with like-minded practices (having a similar or identical opinion, disposition). “Intrahealth’s commissioning vision is to bring the care of our patients closer to home; we want our clinicians to have ownership and it to be local ownership with clinical decisions made closer to the patient.”. Subsequently it was decided that Clinical Commissioning Groups were required to be physically contiguous, so their proposal did not proceed.
