= University of Maiduguri Teaching Hospital =

Government-owned hospital in Nigeria

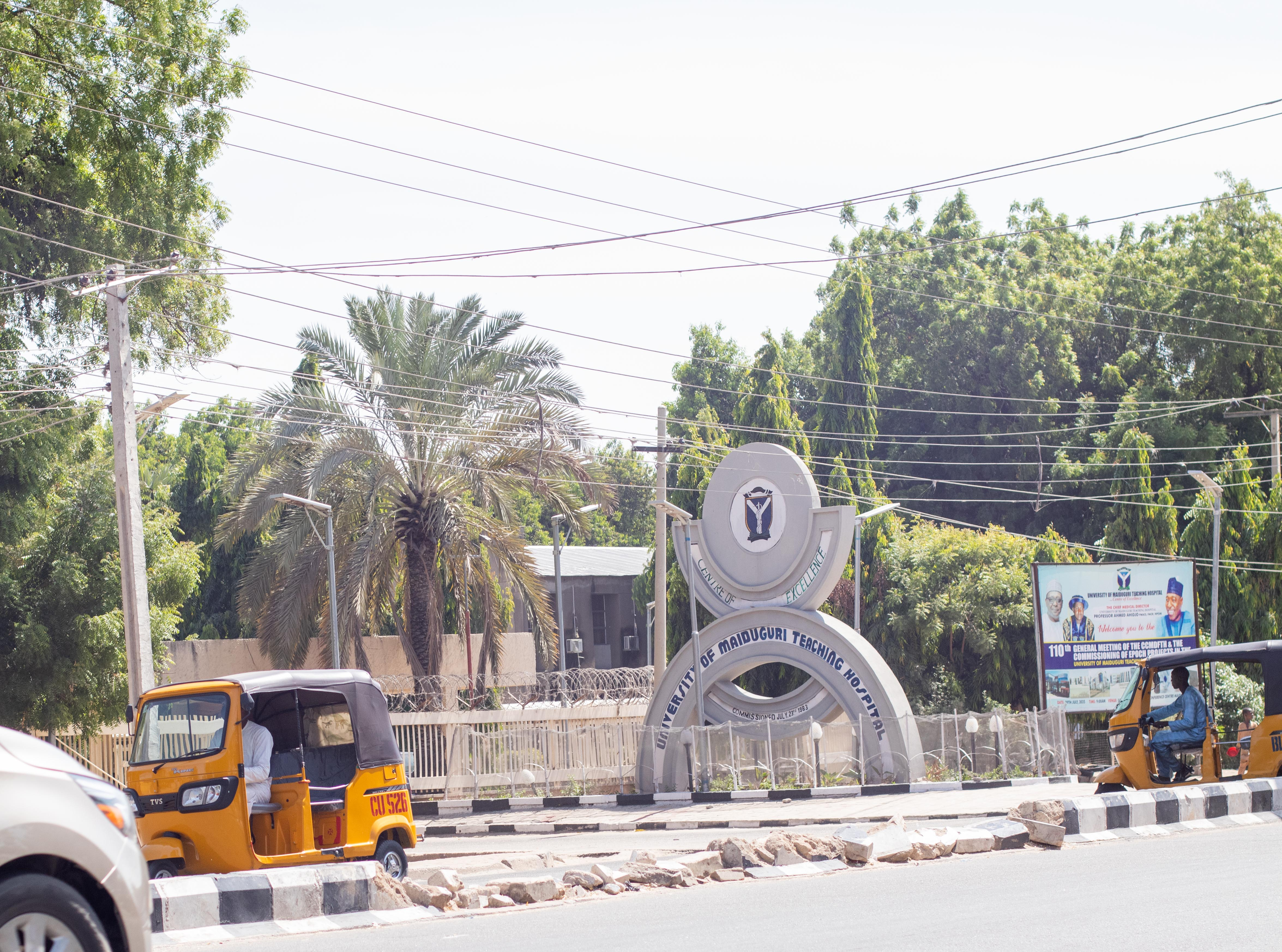

Geography
- Location: Maiduguri, Northern, Borno, Nigeria
- Coordinates: 11.8274°N 13.1809°E

Organisation
- Type: Teaching hospital
- Affiliated university: University of Maiduguri

Services
- Emergency department: Available

History
- Constructed: 1974

Links
- Website: https://www.umth.gov.ng/
- Lists: Hospitals in Nigeria

University of Maiduguri Teaching Hospital is a federal government of Nigeria teaching hospital. The current Chief Medical Officer is Ahmed Ahidjo. The University of Maiduguri Teaching Hospital was established in 1974. Then, the defunct North-East Government conceived the idea of constructing a Specialist Hospital in Maiduguri, the State capital. The then Federal Military Government took over and completed the project. The first patient was admitted on 18 February 1982, and the hospital was officially commissioned on 23 July. 1983. Being the first, and largest Teaching Hospital in the North- East sub region of Nigeria, UMTH covers 64,773 hectares of land. It has, since inception, witnessed remarkable development in infrastructure, equipment and manpower, which culminated into its current designation as "Center of Excellence" in Immunology and Infectious Diseases, by the Federal Government of Nigeria.

== History ==
University of Maiduguri Teaching Hospital was inaugurated on 23 July 1983 by president Shehu Shagari. It was the first teaching hospital in the north east region.

== Overview ==
The institution is the largest hospital in Nigeria with 1,500 beds spread across 27 wards, with 17 clinical and 14 non-clinical departments. The hospital serves a population of more than 2.5 million in the North - East region and the neighbouring Cameroon, Chad and Niger Republics.

== CMD ==
Prof. Ahmed Ahidjo is the 8th Chief Medical Director of UMTH for the past four years, from 3rd September, 2018 to date.

Former CMDs of the Teaching Hospital include;

- Prof. George Edinson, 1979 - 1980
- Prof. Harold Scarbrough, 1980- 1983
- Prof. Suleiman langudoye, 1984 - 1985
- Prof. Idris Mohammed, 1985 - 1994
- Prof. Abba Waziri Adam, 1994 - 2002
- Prof. Utman Kiyari, 2002 - 2010
- Prof. Abdurahamon Tahir, 2010- 2018

== Departments ==
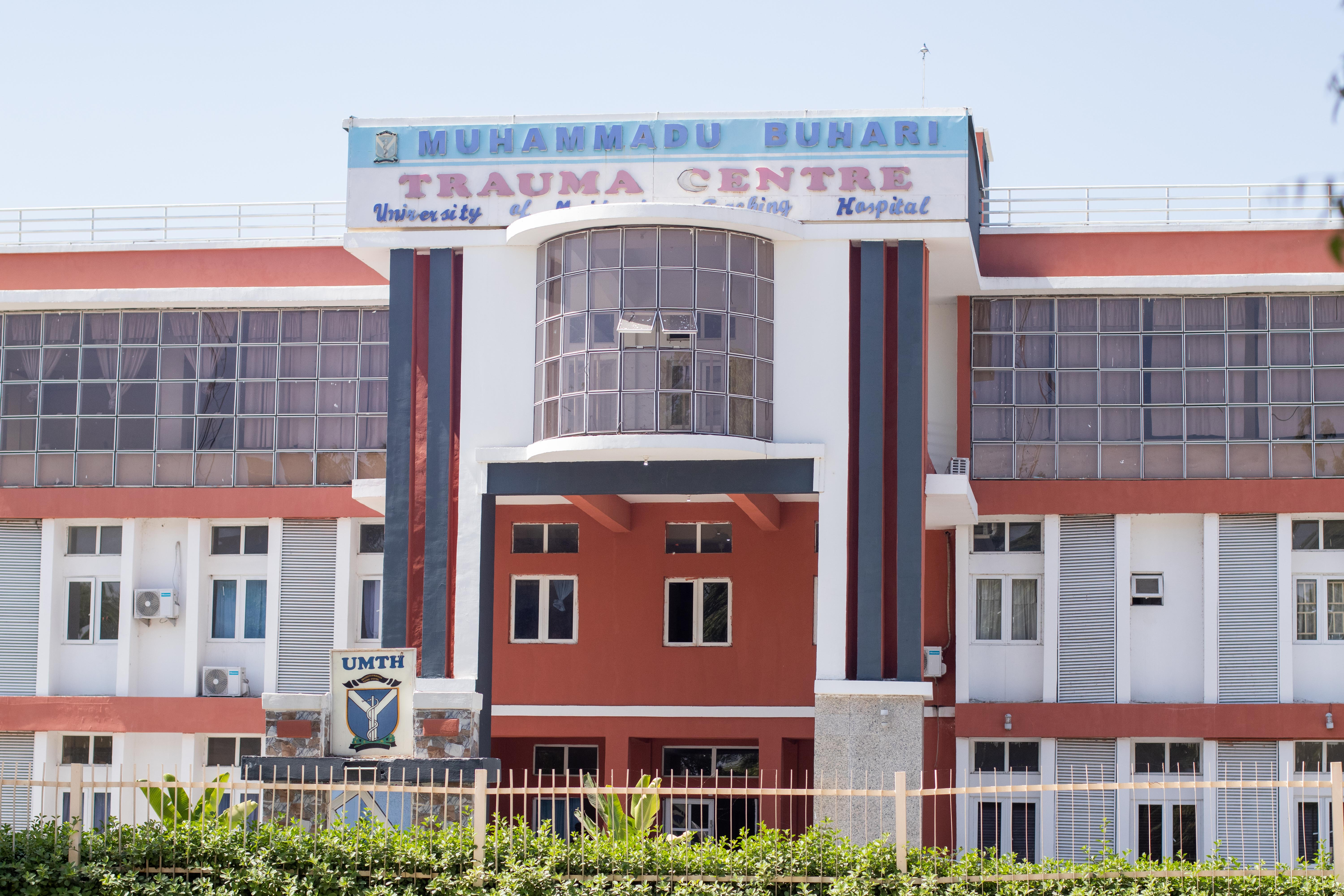
Trauma Center, University of Maiduguri Teaching Hospital, Borno State.

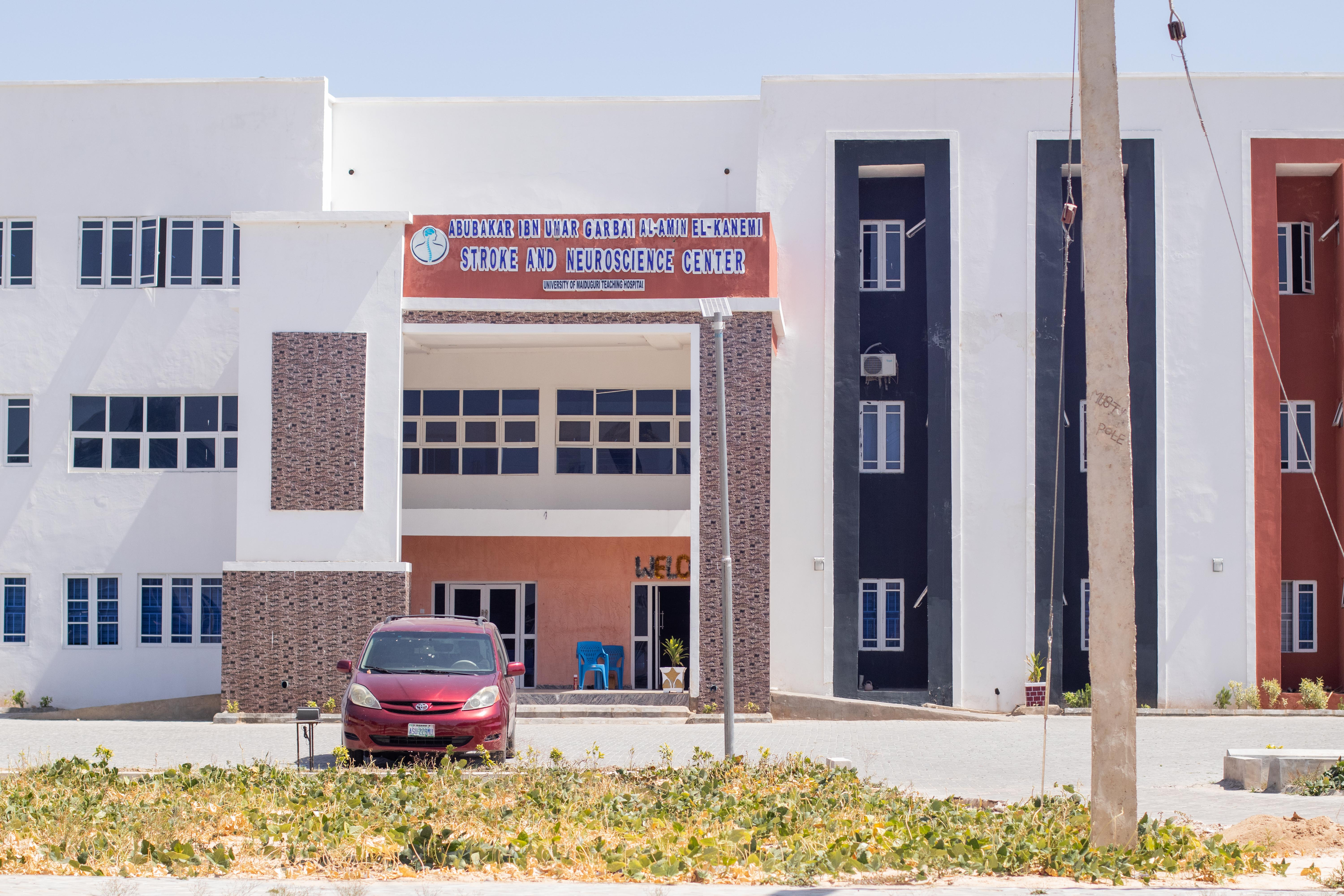
Stroke and Neuroscience Center, University of Maiduguri Teaching Hospital, Borno State

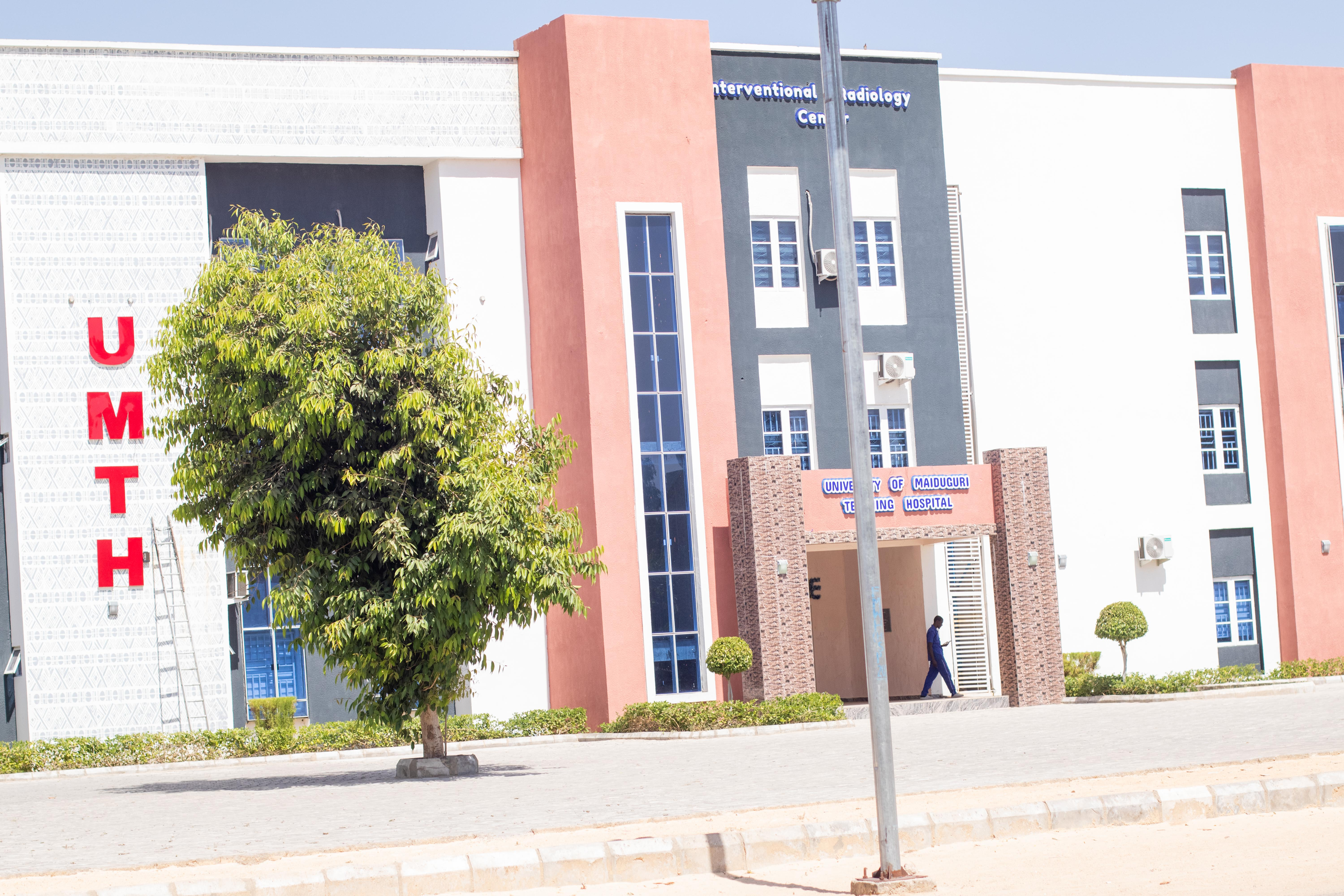
UMTH Radiology Center

=== Clinical departments ===
- Department of surgery
- Department of opthermology
- Department of pharmacy
- Department of ENT
- Department of paedratics
- Department of dentistry
- Department of immunology
- Department of Hematology
- Department of Radiology
- Department of physiotherapy
- Department of internal medicine
- Department of health information management
- Department of family medicine
- Department of orthopedic and trauma management
- Department of clinical oncology
- Department of nursing science
- Department of mental health
- Department of anesthesia
- Department of Radiotherapy
- Department of histopathology
- Department of medical Microbiology
- Department of chemical pathology

=== Non clinical departments ===
- office of the CMD
- Information communication Technology
- Administration department
- Internal audits department
- Finance department
- Store and supplies department
- Engineering department
- Catering department
- Protocol department
- Environmental health department
- Social welfare department

== Donation ==
Borno State Government donated to the medical facility in other to improve the damaged in infrastructure of the Teaching hospital caused by the flood that occurs in borno state in September 2024.

=== Intervention ===
The House of Representatives in Nigeria has called upon the federal government of Nigeria for urgent intervention to the federal teaching hospital maiduguri, due to the damages caused to the hospital by the heavy flood that occurred in the state, when the Alau Dam collapsed in September 2024.

=== Renovation ===
The federal government of Nigeria through the ministry of health partnered with the borno state government to renovate the damaged infrastructure in the hospital.

== Gallery ==
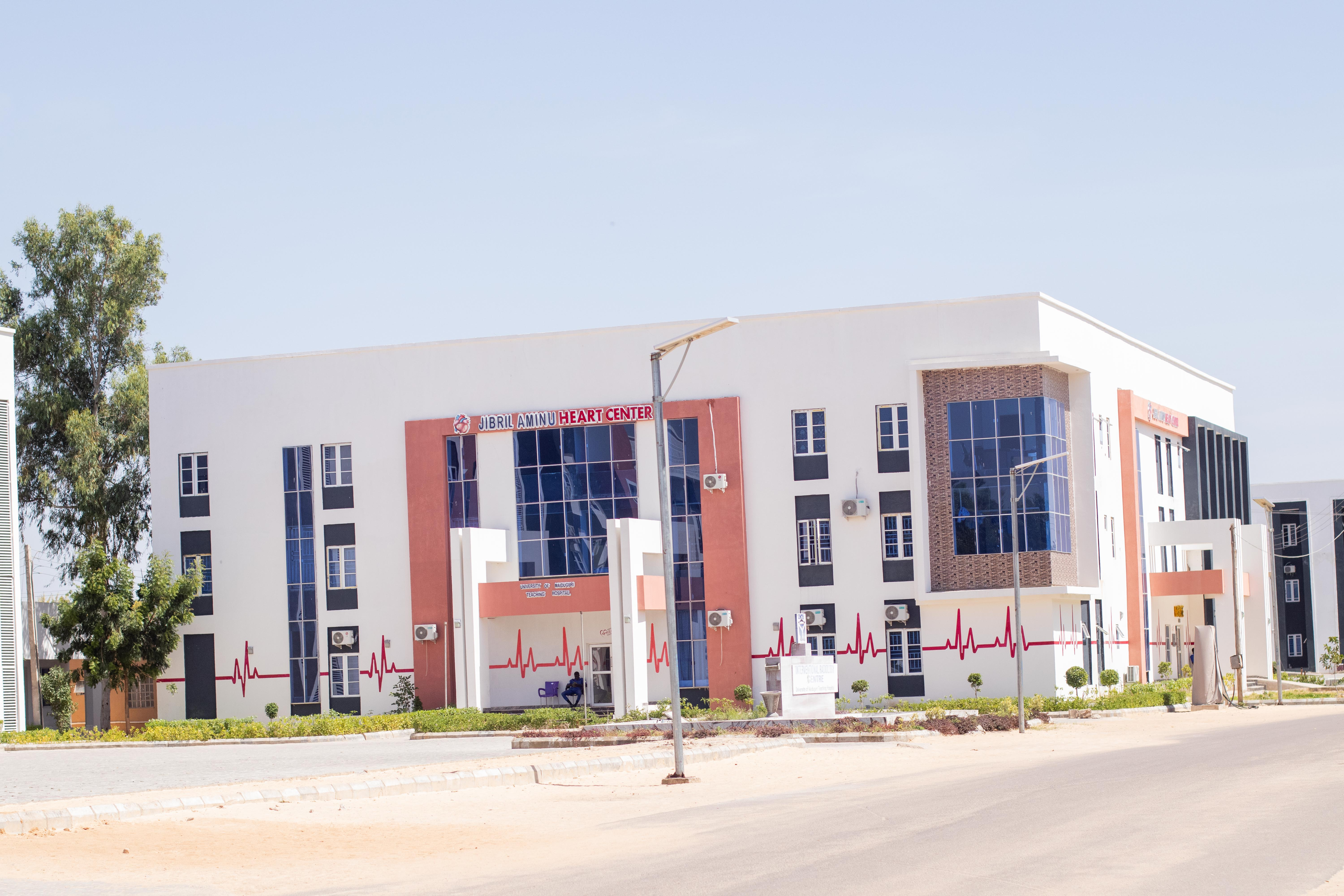

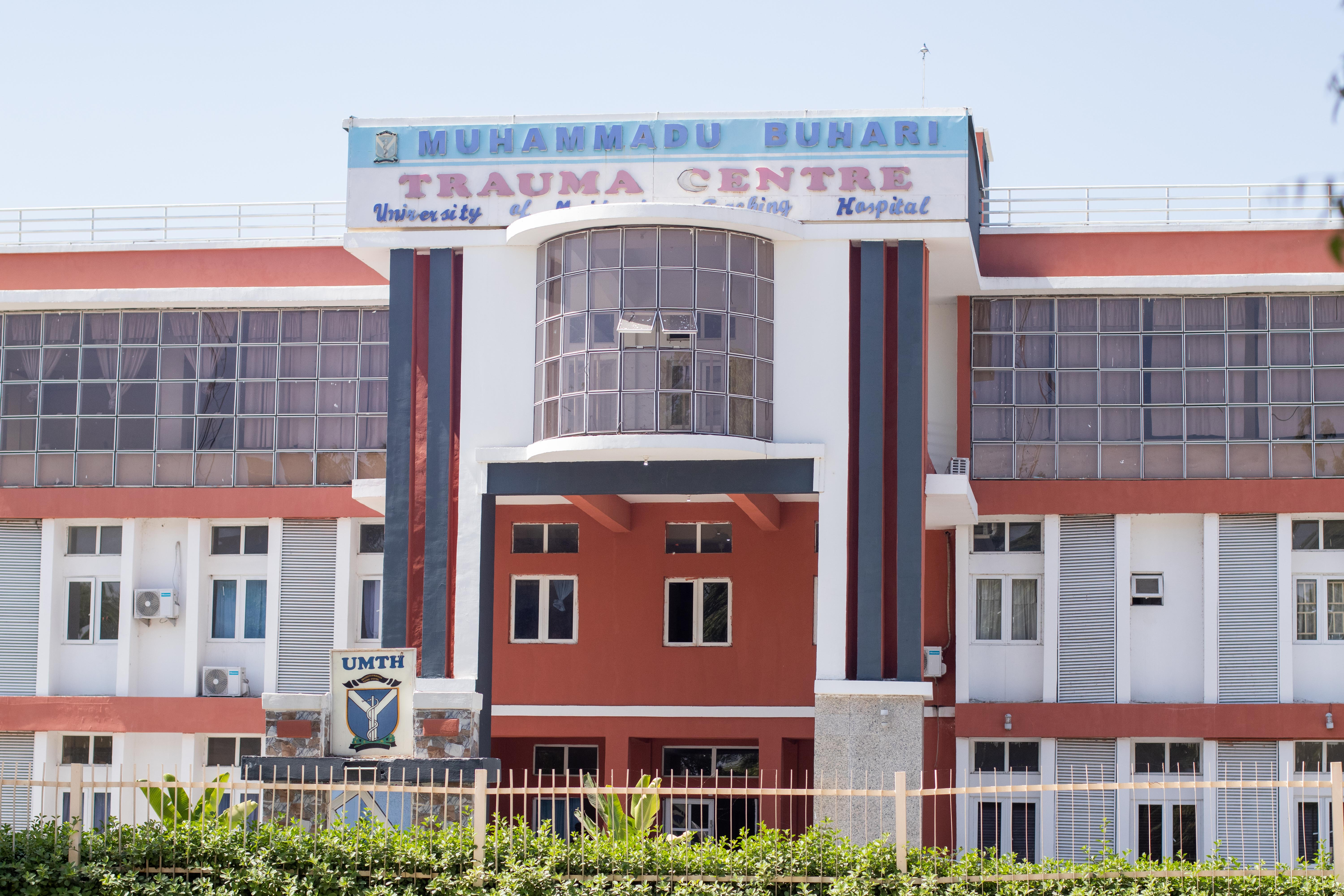

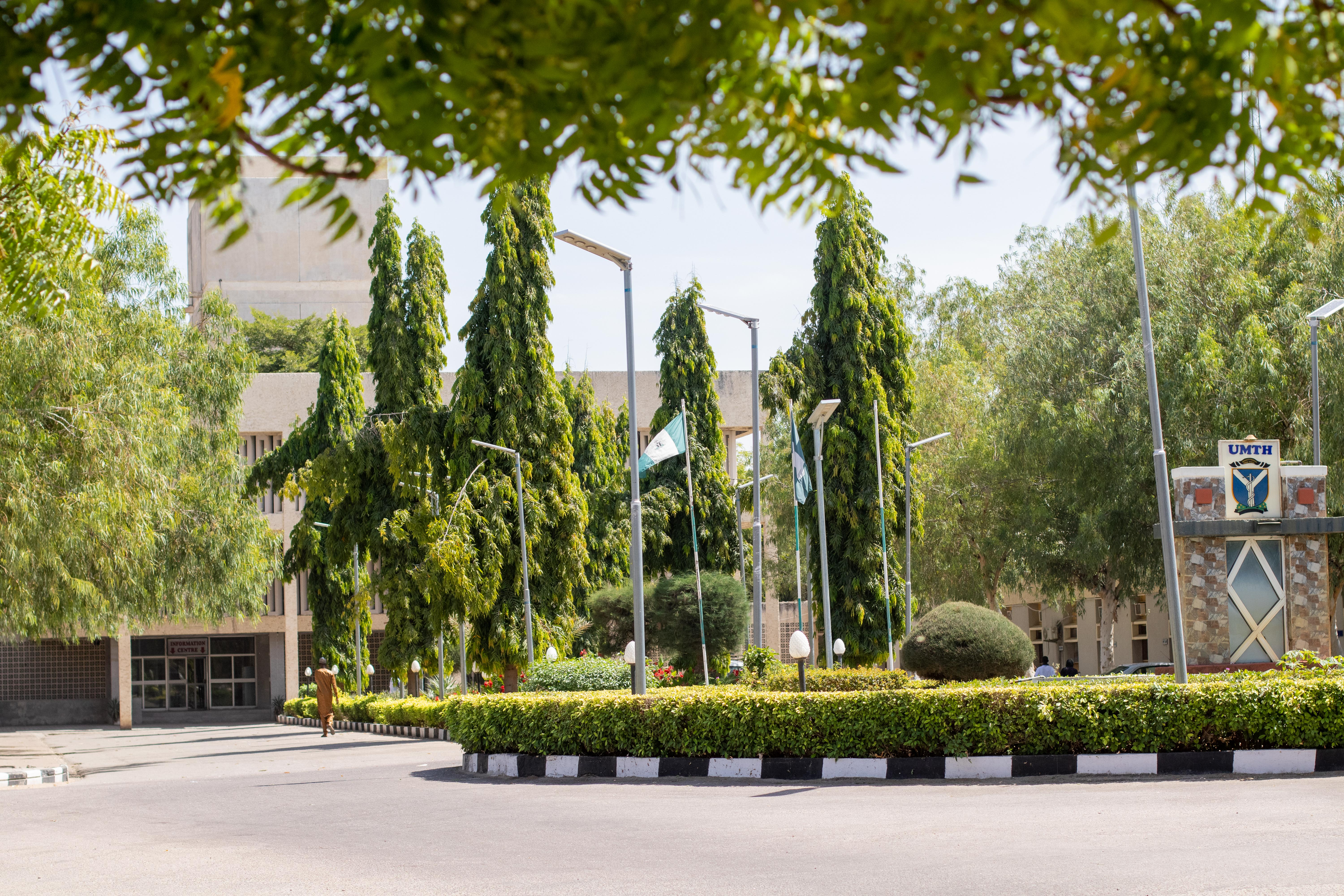

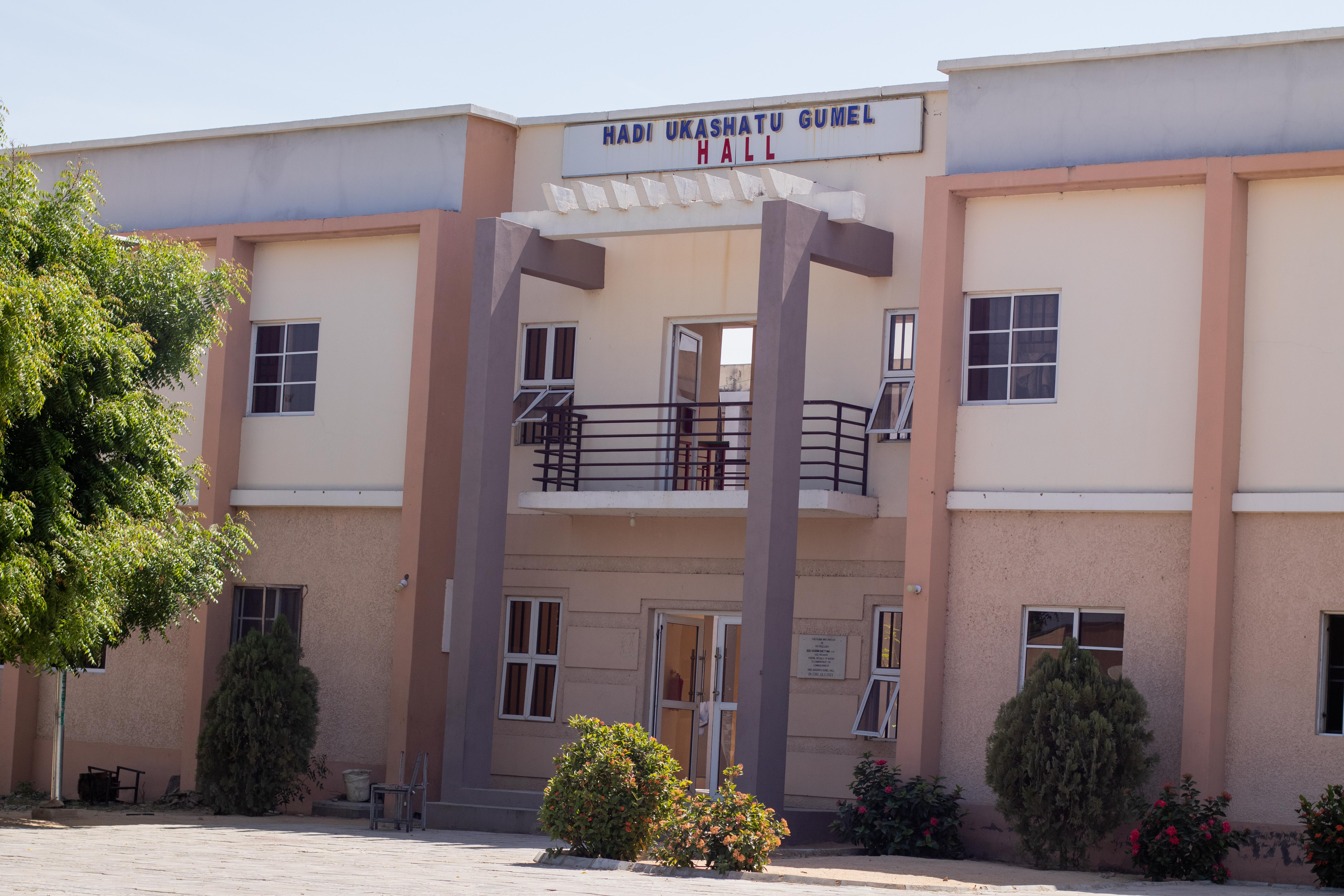

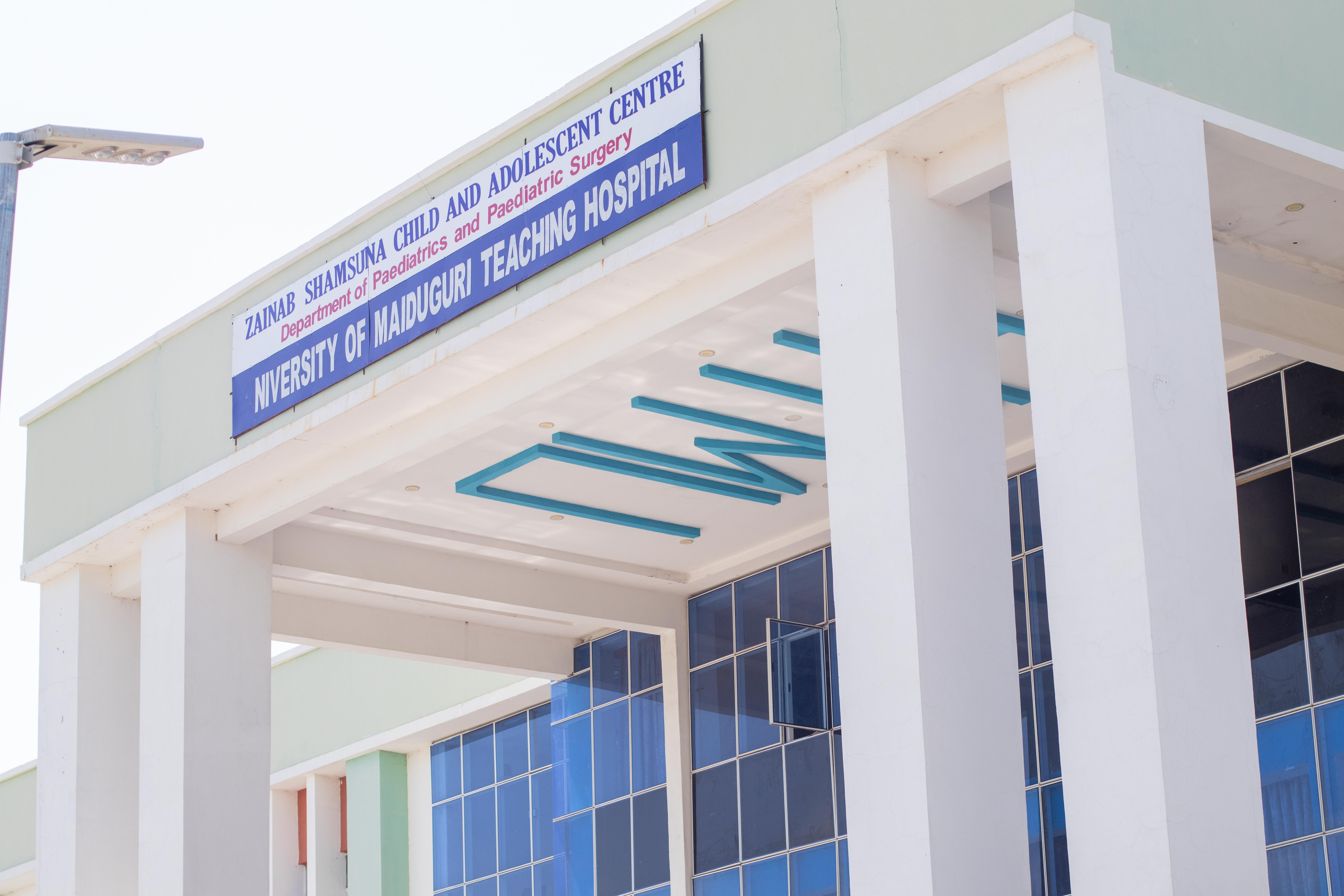

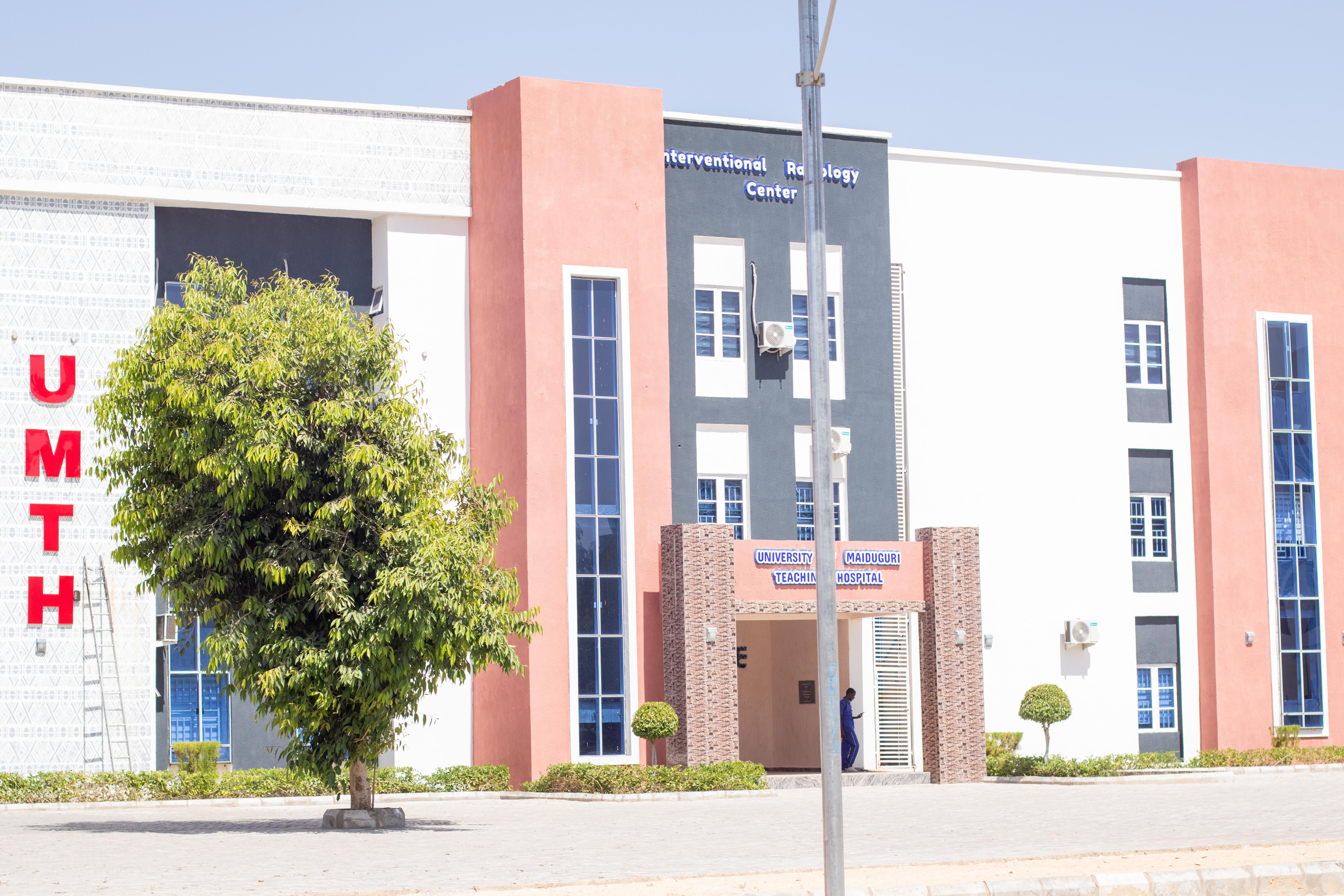

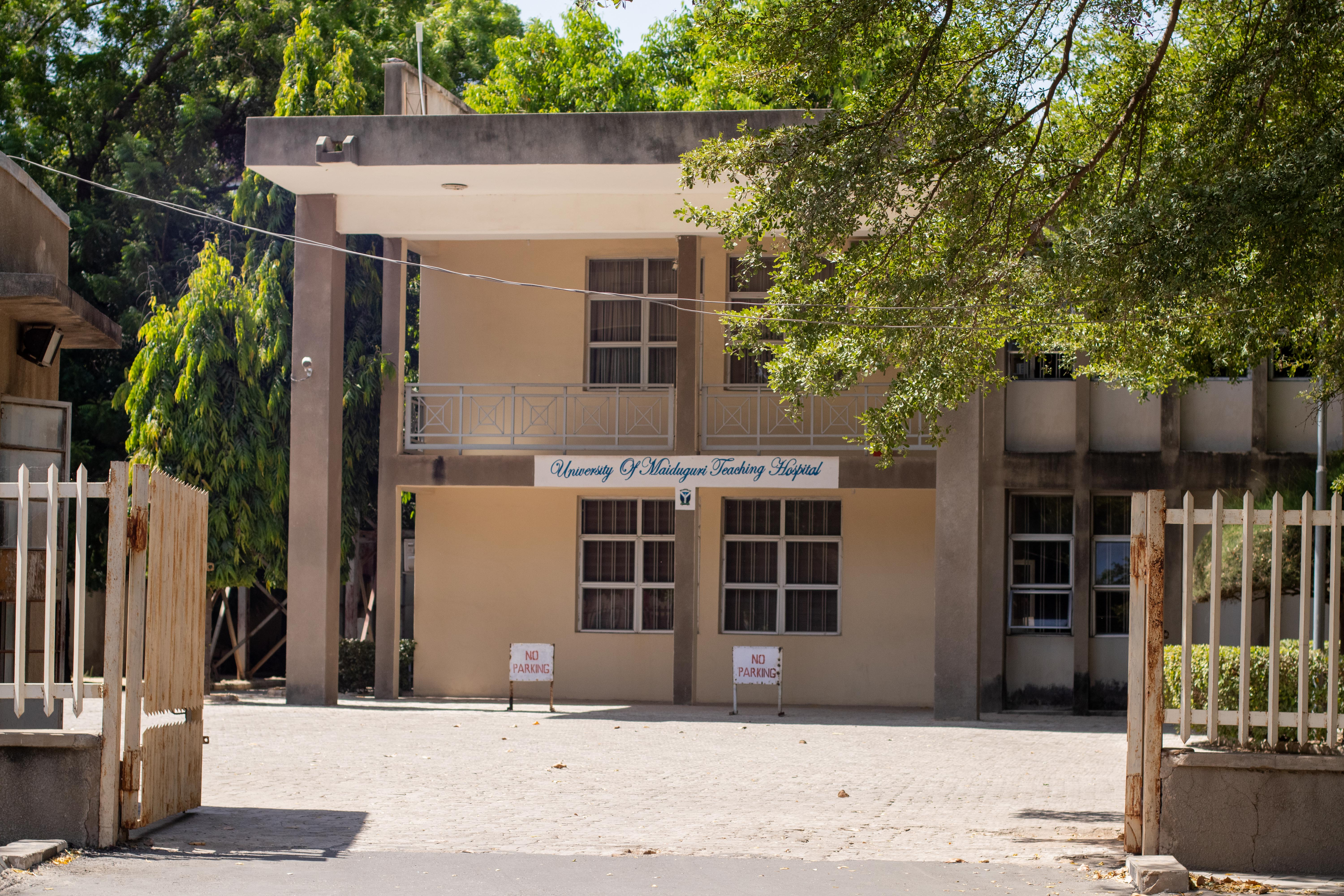

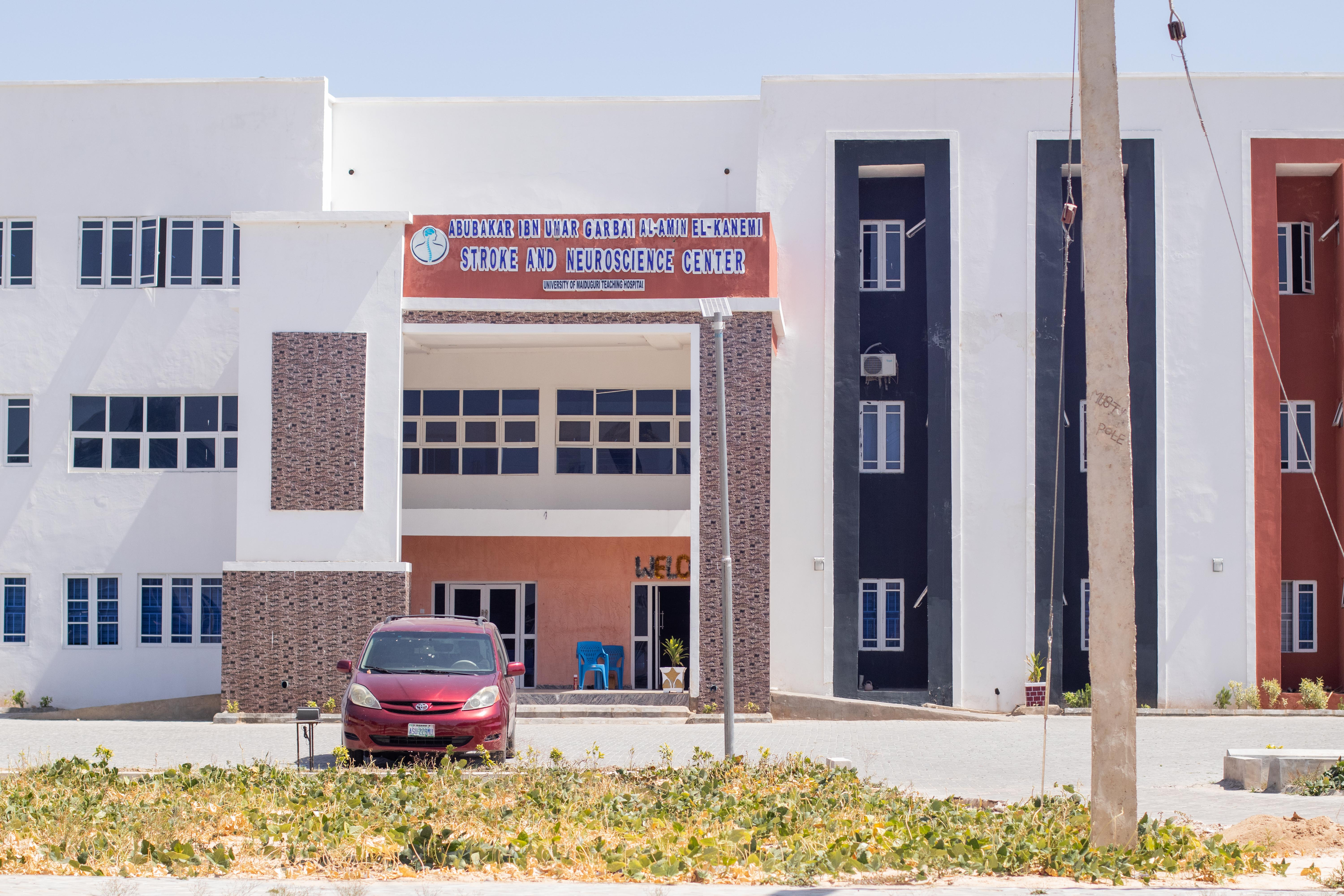

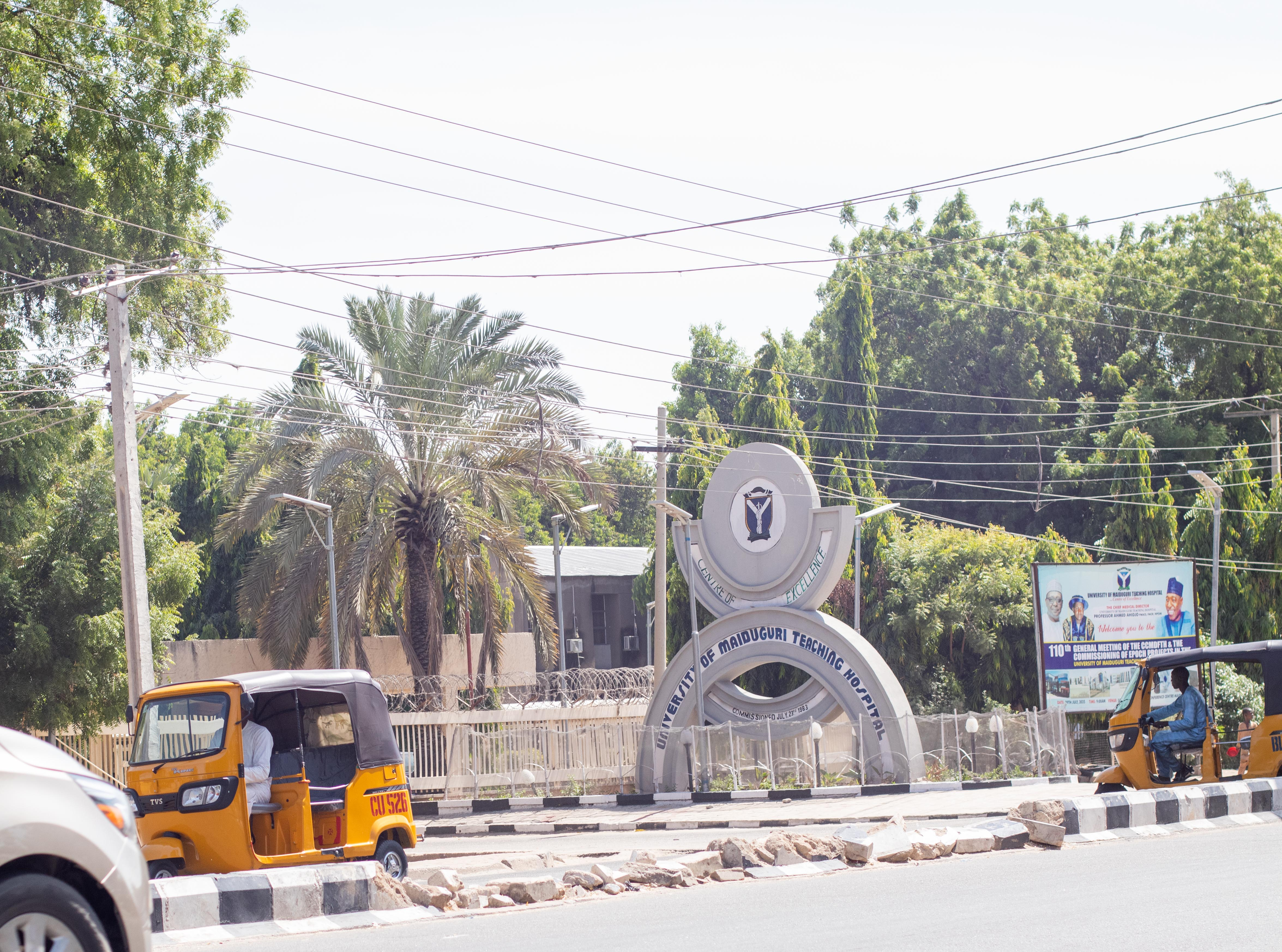

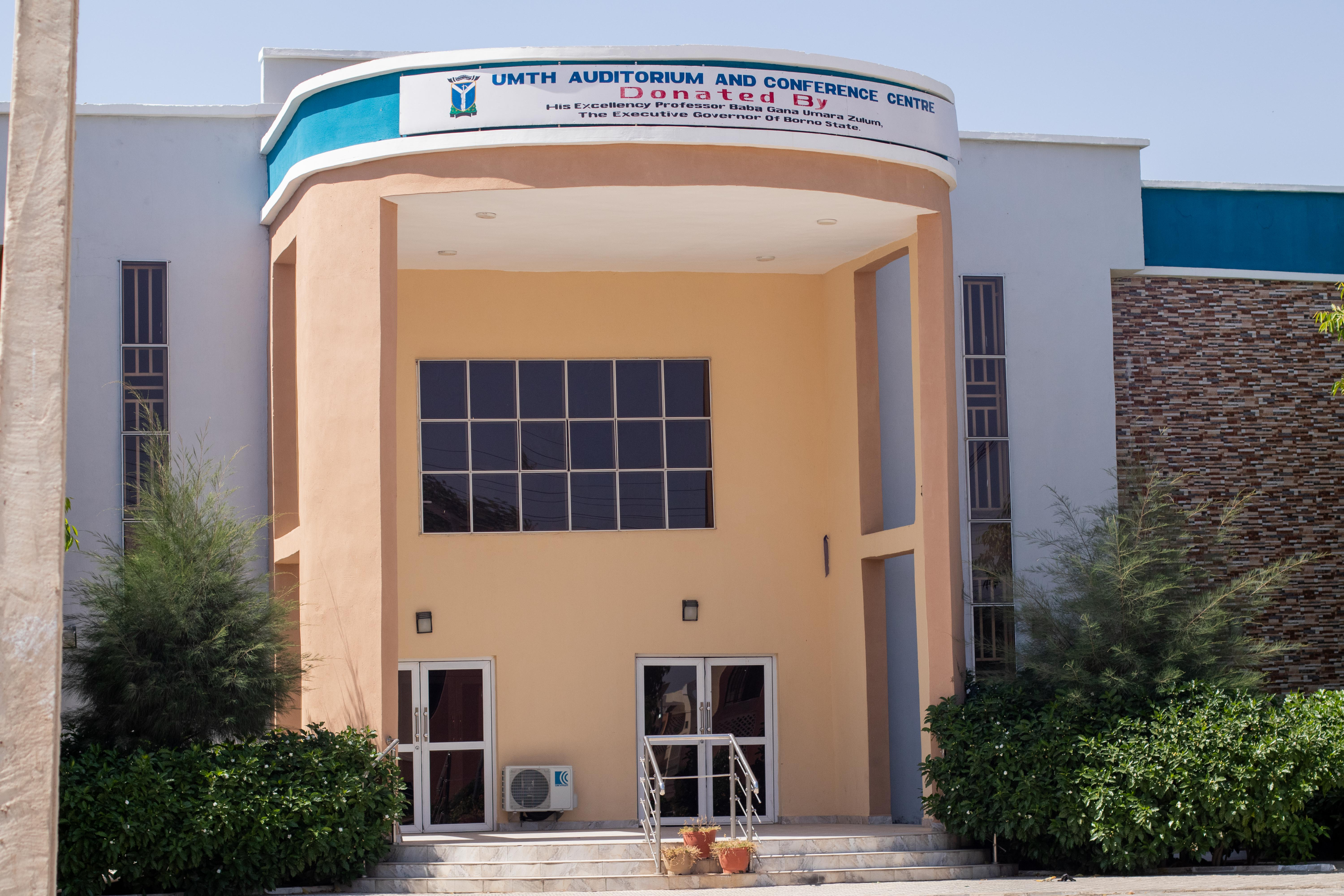

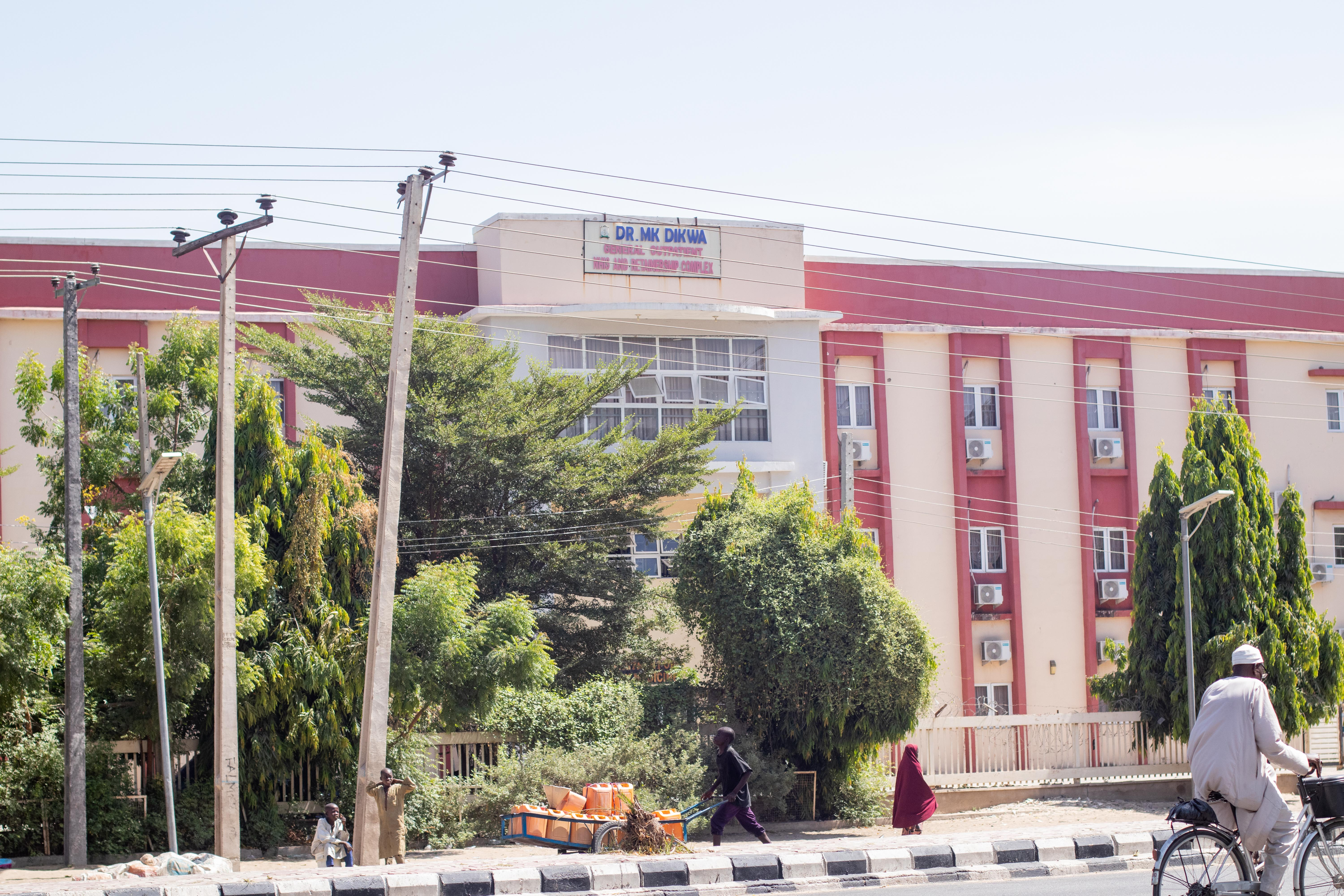

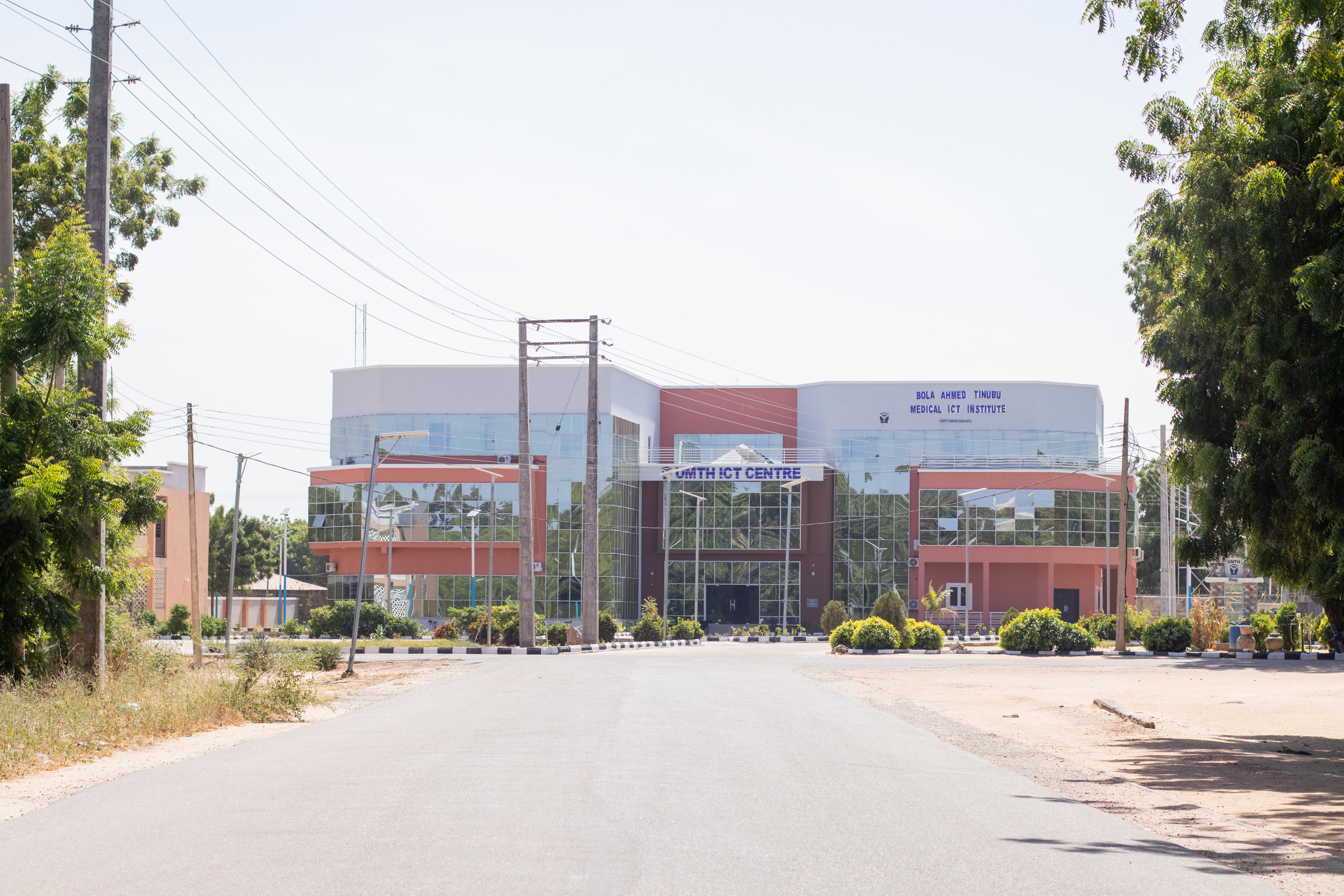

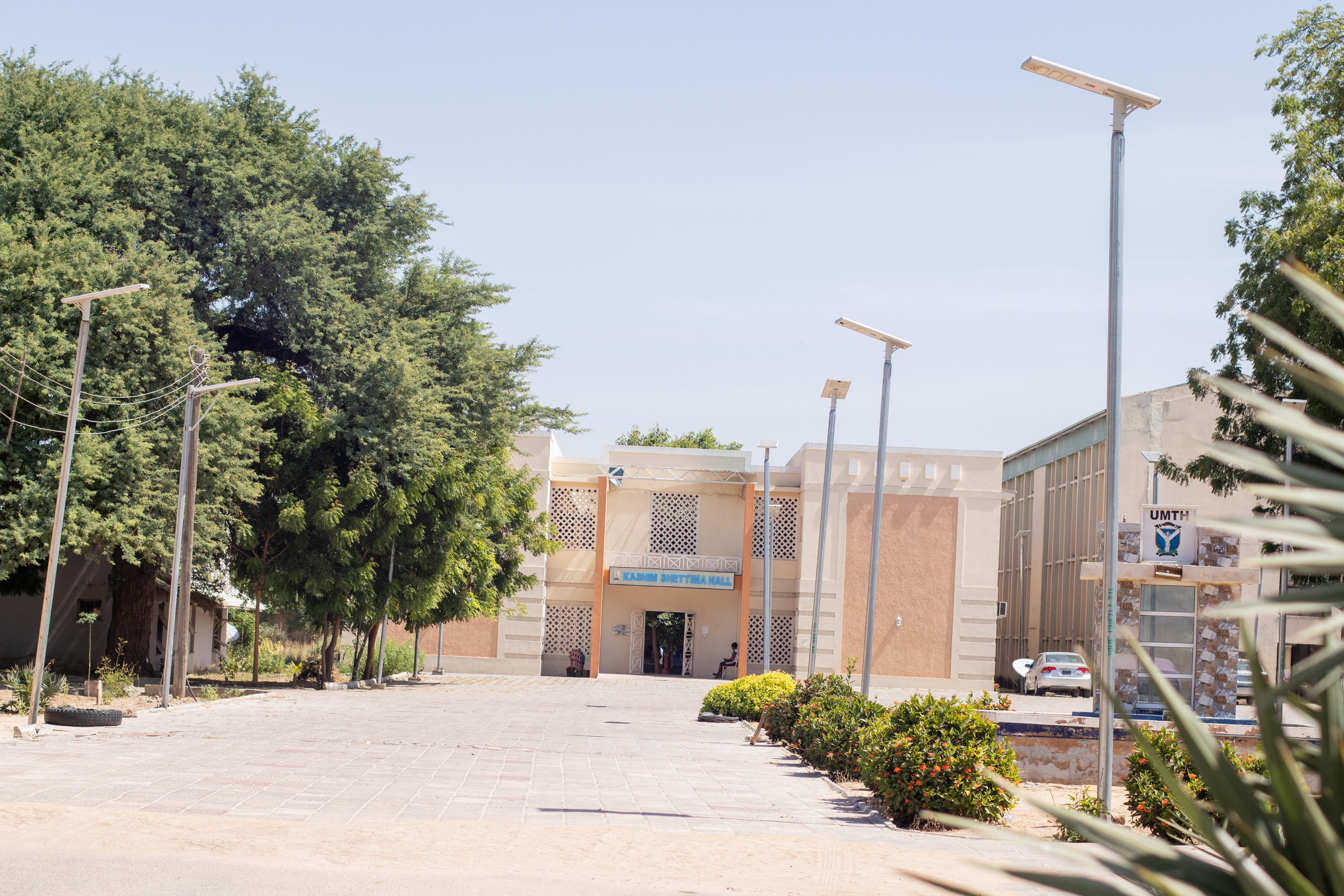
