= 2025 Nigeria floods =

2025 flooding in Nigeria
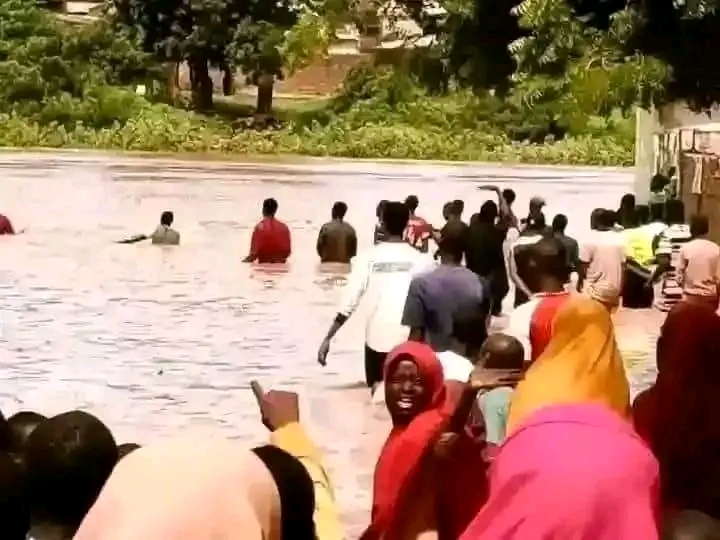
- Flood in Potiskum, Yobe state, Nigeria
- Date: 2025
- Location: Niger State, Rivers State, Kwara State
- Cause: Heavy rainfall
- Deaths: 538
- Injuries: 121
- Property damage: More than 3,000 houses submerged, vehicles swept away, houses buried, paddy fields destroyed, two bridges collapsed, two roads swept away, Mokwa submerged

Starting in April 2025, Nigeria experienced a series of flooding events that caused property damage, fatalities, injuries and displacement. The deadliest flood was the 2025 Mokwa flood in May that killed at least 500 people.

At least 15 million Nigerians were at high risk of flooding and the federal government warned flooding hit 30 of its 36 states, putting more than 1,200 communities at high risk. States at high risk include Abia State, Adamawa State, Akwa Ibom State, Anambra State, Bauchi State, Bayelsa State, Benue State, Borno State, Cross River State, Delta State, Ebonyi State, Edo State, Gombe State, Imo State, Jigawa State, Kebbi State, Kogi State, Kwara State, Lagos State, Nasarawa State, Niger State, Ogun State, Ondo State, Osun State, Oyo State, Rivers State, Sokoto State, Taraba State, Yobe State and Zamfara State. Additionally, 2,187 communities in 293 Local Government Areas across 31 states and the Federal Capital Territory were projected to face moderate flood risk.

== Causes ==
Causes of flooding in Nigeria include the release of water from the Jebba Hydroelectric Power Station dam, that caused at least six floods with one killing at least thirteen people. Heavy rainfall, poor drainage, and weak infrastructure are expected to worsen flash and urban flooding in major cities like Lagos.

== Flooding by location ==
=== Niger State ===
On 28 May, flooding occurred in Mokwa after heavy rainfall and the collapse of a nearby dam, killing at least 500 people, leaving over 600 missing and presumed dead, injuring 121 others and affecting thousands, including more than 4,000 displaced.

Also in Mokwa, floods in April caused by the release of water from the Jebba Hydroelectric Power Station dam killed at least thirteen people, including three people on a canoe that capsized on a flooded river, and destroyed rice fields. The floods affected over 5,000 dry-season farmers across Niger State and Kwara State, impacting over 10,000 ha (25,000 acres) of paddy farms in Mokwa alone with estimated economic losses in the billions of naira. Farmers from Kebbi State, Sokoto State, Katsina State and Kano State were also impacted. Reports indicate that the disaster displaced over 6,400 people, destroyed 45 schools, 44 health centers, and led to the collapse of the Eppa bridge, cutting off communities from urgent help. The flood was the sixth caused by the water released from the dam.

One of the Aftermath of the 2025 Mokwa flood was loss of lives and properties. In a report by BBCnews Saliu Sulaiman, said the floods had left him homeless and destroyed some of his cash business profits.

=== Rivers State ===
In May, torrential rains caused floods and landslides that buried homes and swept people away in the city of Okrika, killing at least twenty-five people. Rescue operations are ongoing but access to remote areas remains difficult due to damaged roads and high water levels. More bodies are still being pulled from debris as of 30 May 2025.

=== Kwara State ===
In April, at least thirteen people were killed in Kwara State and Mokwa in Niger State, including three people on a canoe that capsized on a flooded river, and rice fields were destroyed after flooding triggered by the routine water release from the Jebba Hydroelectric Power Station dam on April 16 affected 30 communities. The floods affected over 5,000 dry-season farmers across Niger State and Kwara State, impacting over 10,000 ha (25,000 acres) of paddy farms in Mokwa alone with estimated economic losses in the billions of naira. Farmers from Kebbi State, Sokoto State, Katsina State and Kano State were also impacted. Reports indicate that the disaster displaced over 6,400 people, destroyed 45 schools, 44 health centers, and led to the collapse of the Eppa bridge, cutting off communities from urgent help. The flood was the sixth caused by the water released from the dam.

=== Borno State ===
In September, heavy Rainfall in maiduguri led to flooding and damages to life and properties in the capital city of Borno state.The floods which leads to lost of life and collapse of dams in the state.

=== Adamawa state ===
In July at least 23 people were killed in the Capital city of adamawa state yola, the heavy Rainfall which lead to flooding, and affected many life's and properties in the state capital.many people were displaced.

=== Ondo state ===
The residents of Ese odo, Okiti pupa in ondo state were affected by a heavy downpour in July 2025. The downpour which leads to flooding and destroy Bridges, properties and rendered many homeless in the state.

=== Osun state ===
The resident of Iwo local government in osun state counted losses as a heavy downpour which leads to flood destroyed and displaced many families in the state.

== See also ==
- 2024 Nigeria floods
- Borno State flooding
- 2024 Lekki flood
- 2025 Mokwa flood
