= 2025 Mokwa flood =

Natural disaster in Nigeria

Coordinates: 9°17′33″N 5°03′45″E

- Map by the Emergency Response Coordination Centre showing the impact
- Date: 28–29 May 2025
- Location: Mokwa, Niger State, Nigeria
- Cause: Heavy rainfall, collapse of a nearby dam and an old railway embankment, poor drainage and deforestation
- Deaths: >500
- Injuries: >200
- Missing: 600+
- Property damage: Millions of naira; town submerged, more than 4,000 houses destroyed, two bridges collapsed, two roads swept away, critical infrastructure damaged, farm produce destroyed and croplands damaged

Location of the flood warning.

On 28 May 2025, flooding caused by heavy rainfall submerged the market town of Mokwa in Niger State, Nigeria, causing severe damage. Officials said that the floods killed at least 500 people and confirmed that over 600 others were missing. At least 200 others were injured and the flooding destroyed over 4,000 homes.

== Background ==
=== Mokwa ===
Mokwa is a market town in Niger State with an estimated population of 416,600 as of 2022. The long southern border of the Local Government Area (LGA) is formed by the Niger River from Lake Jebba in the west beyond the confluence of the Kaduna River in the east. Kwara State and Kogi State are across the Niger from the LGA. The A1 highway crosses the Niger at Gana to Jebba in Kwara State. Mokwa is a major meeting point where traders from the south buy food from growers in the north.

=== Flooding in Nigeria ===
Flooding in Nigeria has become a yearly occurrence that claims lives and destroys many properties. In 2024, flooding in Nigeria killed more than 1,200 people, injured at least 2,712 others, and displaced 1.2 million.

A previous flood in Mokwa on 16 April 2025, caused by the release of water from the Jebba Hydroelectric Power Station dam, killed 13 people, including three people on a canoe that capsized on a flooded river, and destroyed paddy fields. The floods affected over 5,000 dry-season farmers across Niger State and Kwara State, impacting over 10,000 ha (25,000 acres) of paddy farms in Mokwa alone with estimated economic losses in the billions of naira. Farmers from Kebbi State, Sokoto State, Katsina State and Kano State were also impacted. Reports indicate that the disaster displaced over 6,400 people, destroyed 45 schools, 44 health centers, and led to the collapse of the Eppa bridge, cutting off communities from urgent help. The flood was the sixth caused by the water released from the dam. Dam management continues to be a recurring factor in flood-related risks.

== Flood ==
Map by the Emergency Response Coordination Centre (ERCC) showing accumulated rainfall between 27 May and 5 June at 6.00 UTC and flooded areas in red.

The flood started on 28 May 2025, after several hours of torrential rainfall in the town and surrounding areas. The flood submerged the town and washed away homes with residents inside and vehicles, including a tank truck. The Mokwa bridge collapsed on 28 May, leaving motorists stranded and disrupting vehicular movements and economic activities across the region. Another bridge and two roads were also washed away. A People were washed downstream into the Niger River. Excavator teams were needed to remove bodies that were stuck under debris. According to the Niger State Emergency Management Agency and later confirmed by Deputy Governor Yakubu Garba, the Tiffin Maza and Auguwan Hausawa districts of Mokwa were worst affected. Authorities said the search and rescue operation is still ongoing as of May 30 and many people are still at risk. Local government officials said a dam collapse in a nearby town worsened the situation.

== Aftermath ==
Niger State politicians Joshua Audu-Gana and Saba Ahmed Umaru confirmed in July that the floods killed 500 people and injured at least 200 others. The deputy chairman of Mokwa Local Government, Musa Kimboku, said that rescue efforts have ceased because authorities no longer believe anyone could still be alive. NEMA described the flood as one of the worst in the state's history. The Acting Director General of NEMA, Ibrahim Hussaini confirmed on 1 June 2025, that over 153 bodies were discovered under the Mokwa bridge due to the flood waves and they have been buried.

NEMA said 3,534 residents were displaced while local media reported at least 5,000. The displaced people face rising health risks from cholera, typhoid fever and malnutrition. Critical infrastructure and more than 10,000 ha (25,000 acres) of paddy fields and croplands have been destroyed as well, affecting regional food supply chains. The flooding destroyed property worth millions of naira. A thousand people were reported missing, including a family of 12 where only four members were accounted for and all 100 children from a madrasa. The number of missing people was later revised to over 600 as 500 people were confirmed dead. More than 4,000 houses were destroyed. NEMA provided food and non-food relief items including rice, blankets, and mats.

According to a report by BBC, one of the victim of the flood, Saliu Sulaiman, said the floods had left him homeless and destroyed some of his cash business profits

== Reactions ==
Senator Sani Musa extended heartfelt condolences to the government and people of Niger State following the floods and its surrounding communities and donated 50 million naira and several truckloads of food items, including rice, millet and maize to displaced families and vulnerable https://www.worldwildlife.org/our-work/forests/deforestation-and-forest-degradation/ across the affected areas. President Bola Tinubu activated the National Emergency Response Centre and deployed federal agencies. Relief materials and temporary shelters were provided. The Nigeria Hydrological Services Agency did not immediately say how much rain fell after midnight Thursday. Mohamed Adow, director of Kenya-based thinktank Power Shift Africa, called it a "cruel irony" that parts of Africa can be "baked dry and then suffer from floods that destroy lives and livelihoods" and said "The terrible floods in Nigeria are another reminder that Africa stands on the front line of the climate crisis." More than 3 billion naira and other relief materials were donated within two weeks to help victims.

== See also ==
- 2025 Nigeria floods
- 2024 Nigeria floods
- Borno State flooding
- 2024 Lekki flood
