= Borno State flooding =

Major floods in Nigeria in 2024

- Date: September 2024
- Location: Borno State, Nigeria
- Cause: Heavy rainfall and the collapse of Alau Dam
- Deaths: 150
- Property damage: 70% community submersion, displacing 419,000+

Location of Alau Dam in Nigeria.

Borno State, Nigeria, faced flooding after the collapse of the Alau Dam on 10 September 2024. The Maiduguri and Jere local government areas were particularly affected: according to the National Emergency Management Agency, over 70% of the residents in Maiduguri were displaced. At least 150 people died. The United Nations refugee agency in Nigeria described it as the worst to hit the city in thirty years, affecting over one million people.

The flooding was a part of the 2024 Nigeria floods.

== Background ==
West Africa has experienced some of its worst flooding in decades. According to the United Nations, over 2.3 million people were affected in 2023, three times more than in 2022.

The Alau Dam was constructed in 1986 to help farmers with irrigation and to help control flooding from the Ngadda River. Before 2024, the dam has broken twice: in 1994 and 2012, leading to flooding of local communities.

The Borno State has also been experiencing a humanitarian crisis over the last decade due to the Boko Haram insurgency. The insurgency has displaced over 2.6 million people with many living in camps that are vulnerable to flooding.

== Causes ==
Continuous rainfall began toward the end of August in Bama, Damboa and Gwoza local government areas, and the Nigeria Meteorological Agency predicted that it could lead to flooding. As the water level in the Alau Dam reservoir began to rise, officials were alerted by concerned locals and an inspection team arrived.

== Dam burst ==
On 10 September, the Alau Dam started to fracture and eventually burst its banks, triggering flash floods that inundated, submerged and devastated low-lying communities in the state.

== Reactions ==
Governor Babagana Zulum opened up the Bakassi internally displaced persons (IDP) camp and others in highland areas for citizen safety. He told reporters that over one million people were affected by the flood and described the damage as "beyond human imagination".

Vice President Kashim Shettima visited the state to see the level of damage and assured residents of the federal government intervention to help them cope with the issue.

Damaged septic tanks and flooded graveyards are also spurring fears of a rapid spread of infectious diseases. World Health Organization Nigeria Country Representative Dr. Kazadi Mulombo announced that WHO would lead the health response in coordination with other agencies like the World Food Programme and UNICEF, which are focusing on nutrition, water, sanitation and hygiene.

== Aftermath ==
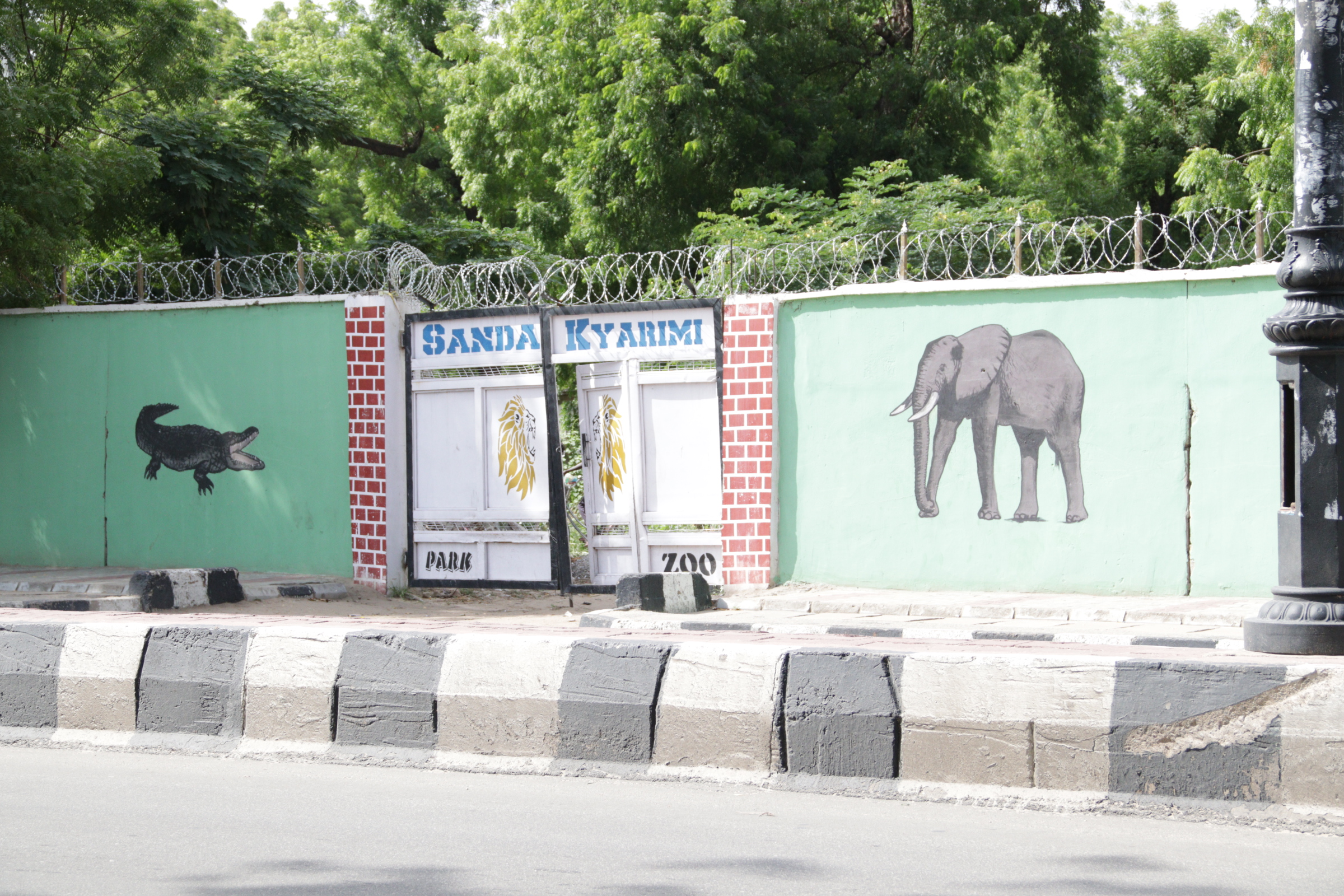
Many animals were killed or escaped from captivity at the Sanda Kyarimi Park Zoo

The governor announced the closure of schools in the state as the water level kept rising due to the collapse of the dam. The flood affected the Sanda Kyarimi Park Zoo, a zoological garden and wildlife location in Maiduguri. Reports showed that 40% of its animals perished while others escaped from captivity and were seen on the streets of the capital. Due to the risk of attacks from animals, residents were urged to take precautions.

The flooding displaced over 70% of the residents in Borno state and over 70% of Maiduguri town was affected, according to National Emergency Management Agency (NEMA). It said at least 30 people died and over 400,000 were displaced.

The state General Hospital and the University of Maiduguri Teaching Hospital were also affected as a result of the flood. The IDP camps were also affected as people were relocated from the El Miskin Camp to the Bakasi Camp for safety according to the director-general of NEMA.

After the flooding caused the wall to collapse, 270 prisoners escaped from the medium security Nigerian Correctional Service prison in Maidugur. So far seven prisoners have been recaptured with Governor Zulum alleging that some members of the Islamist militant group Boko Haram were among those who had got out.

== Gallery ==
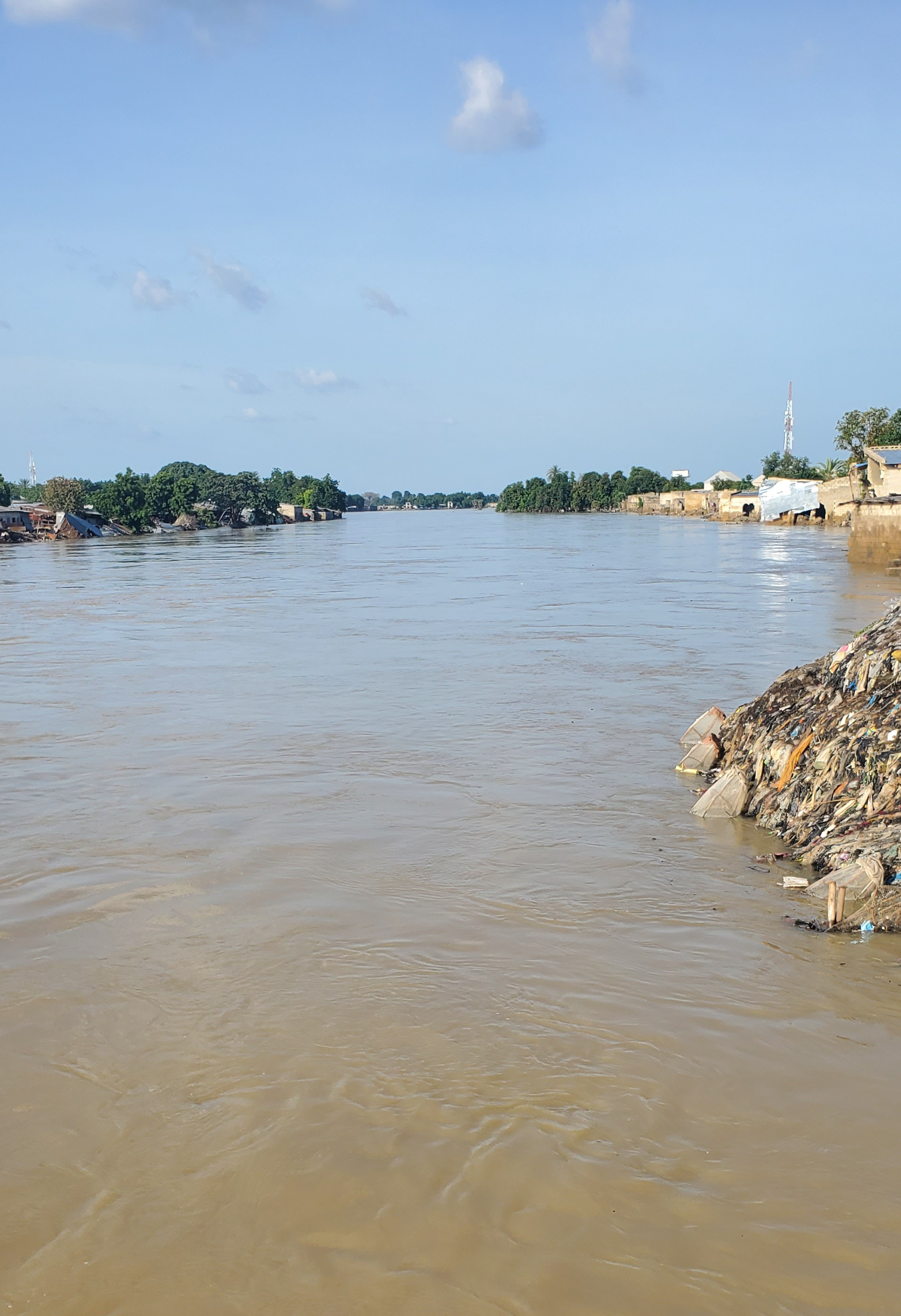

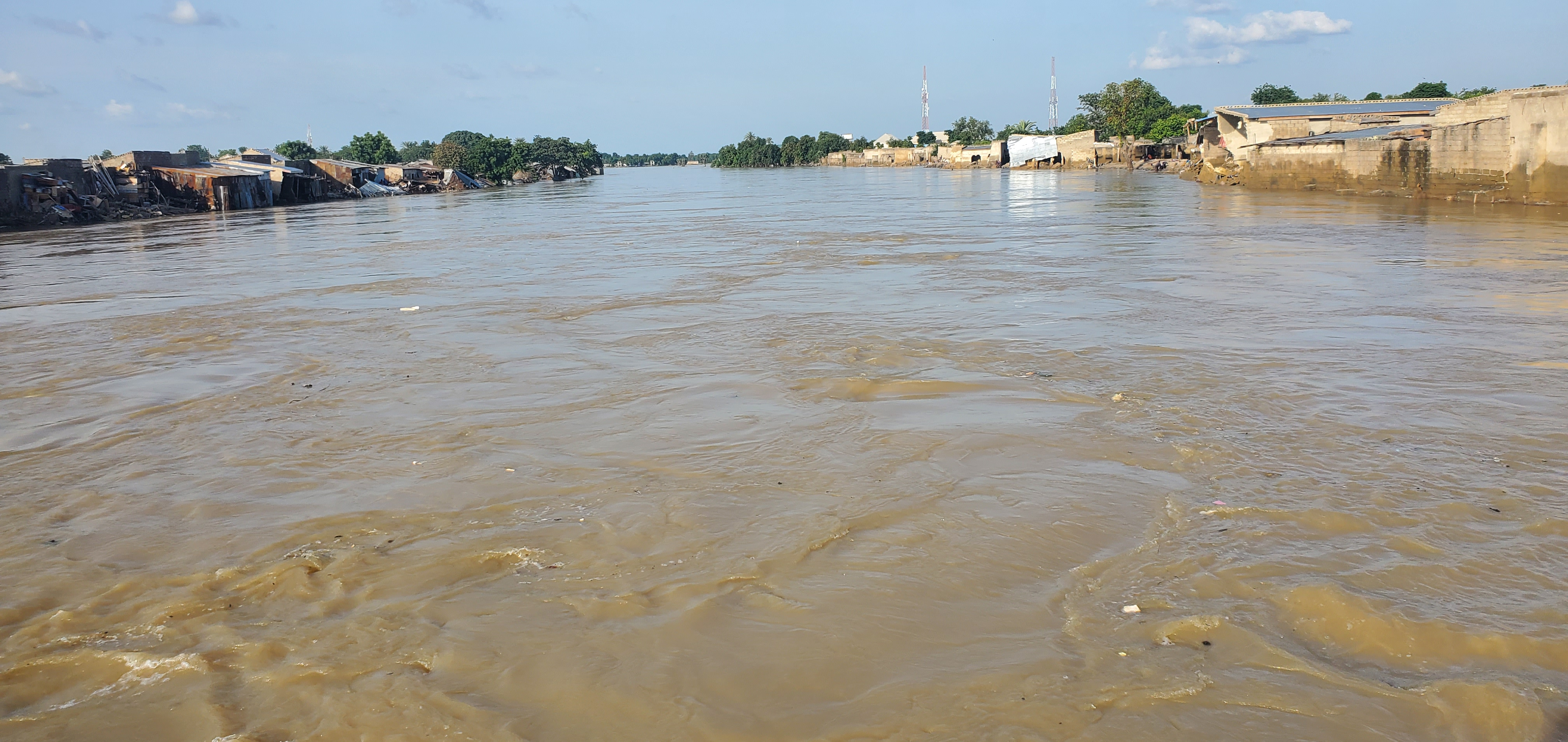

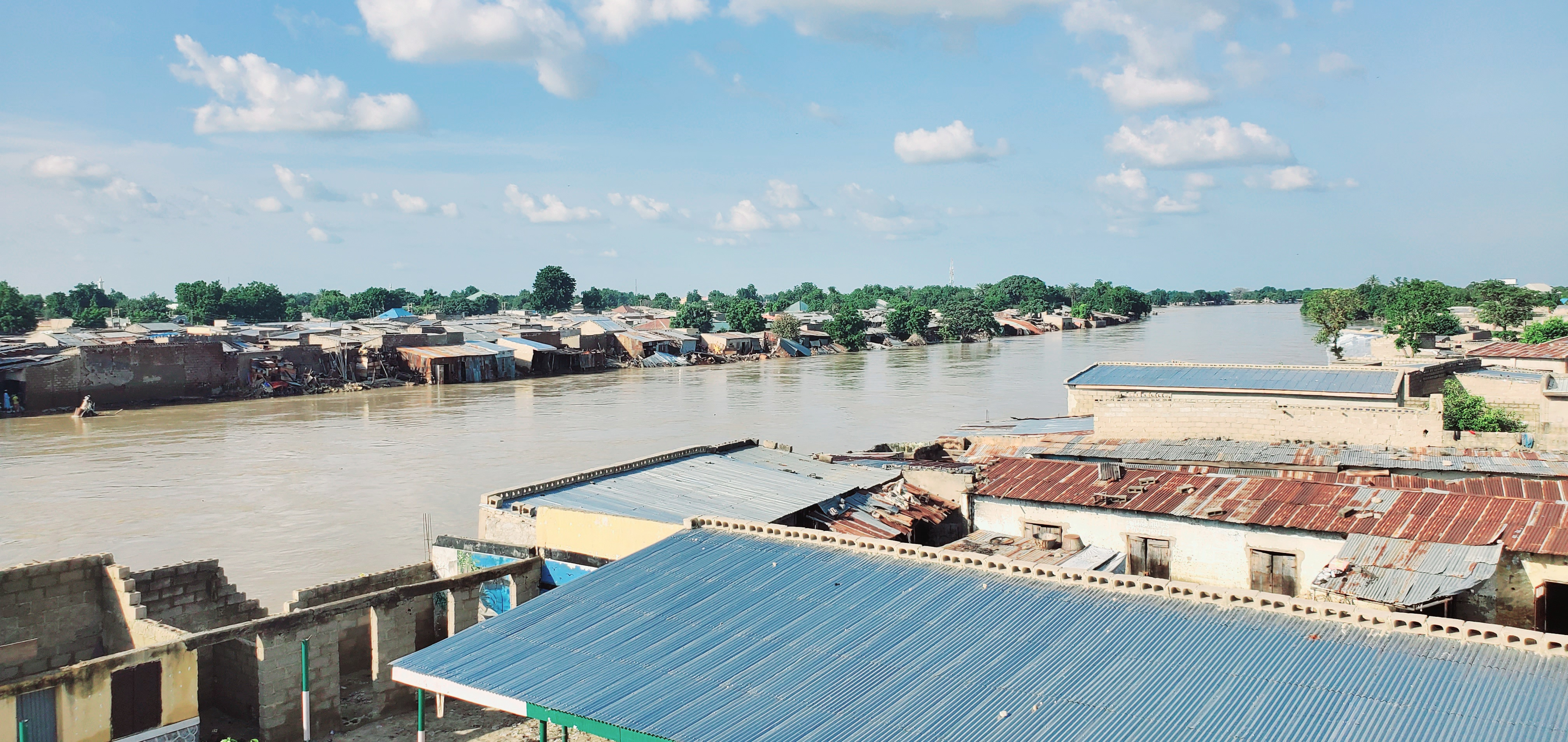

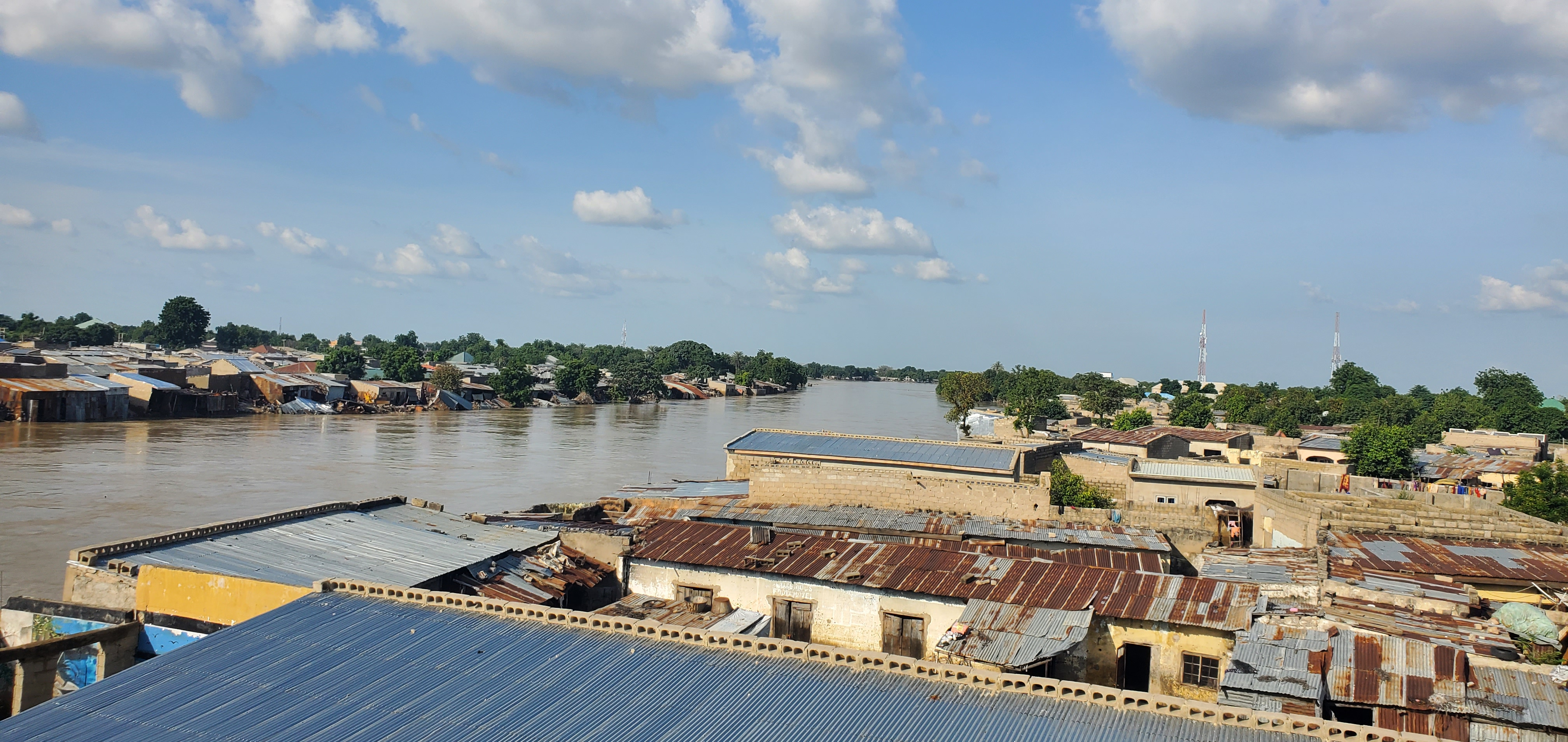

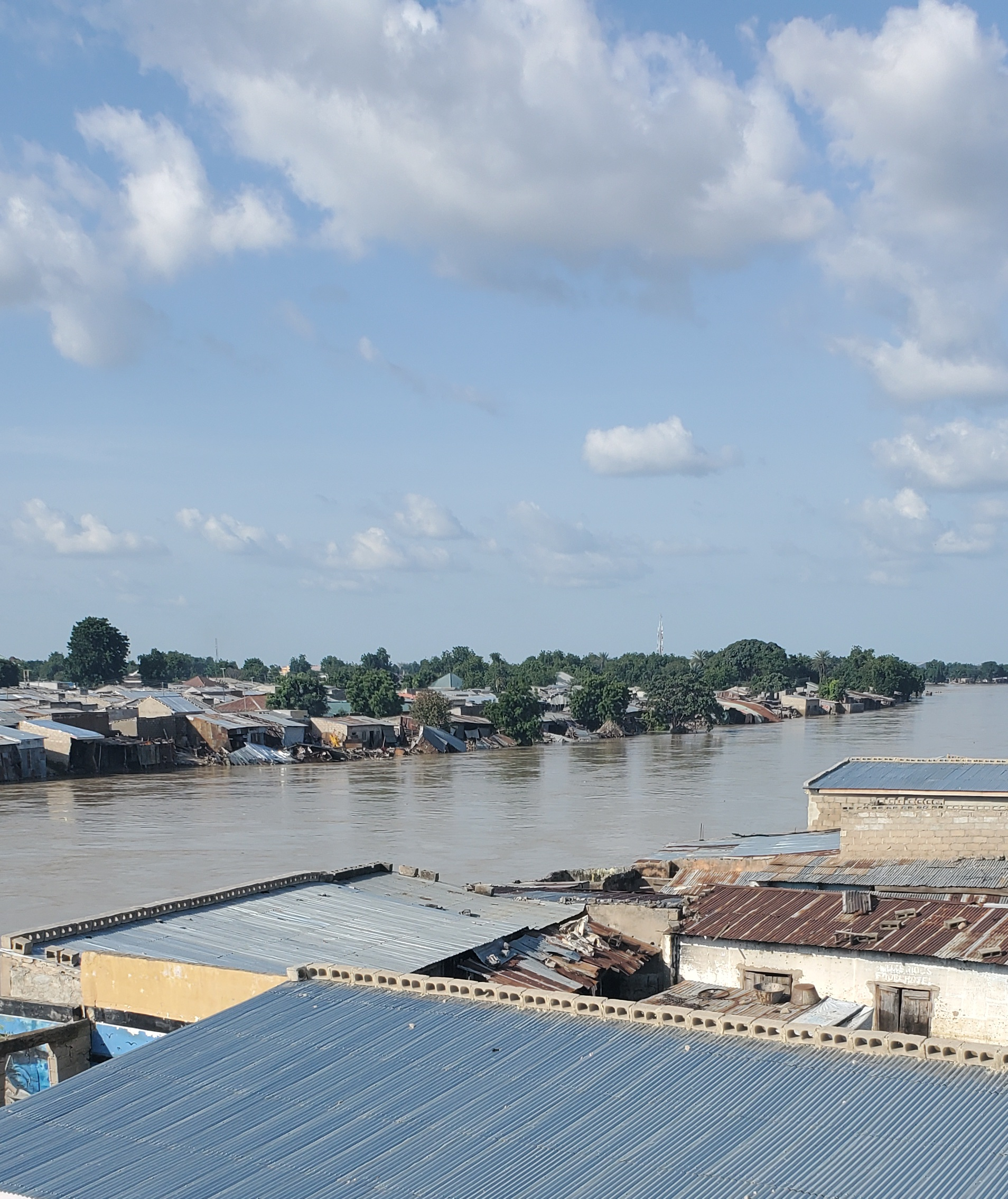

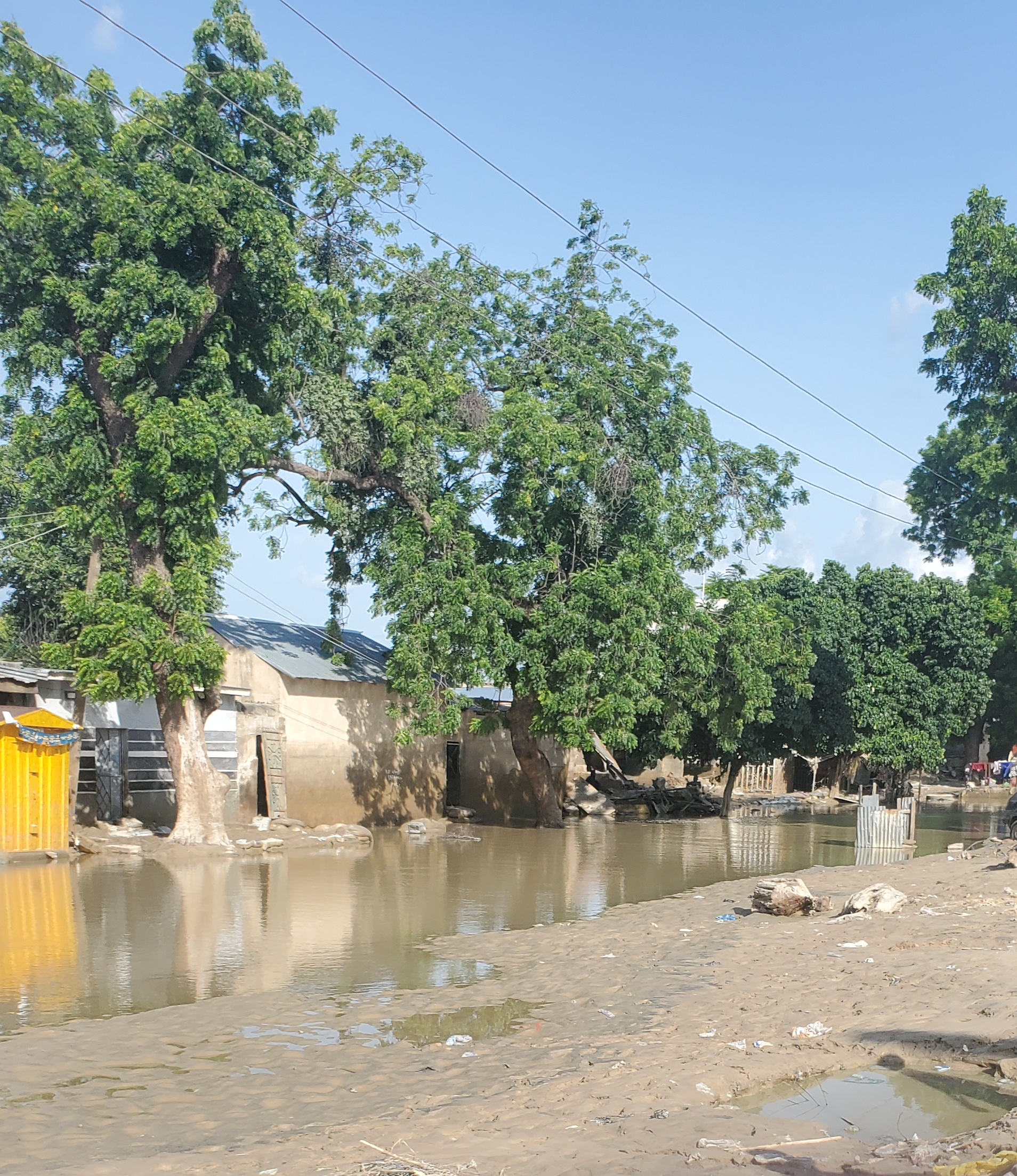

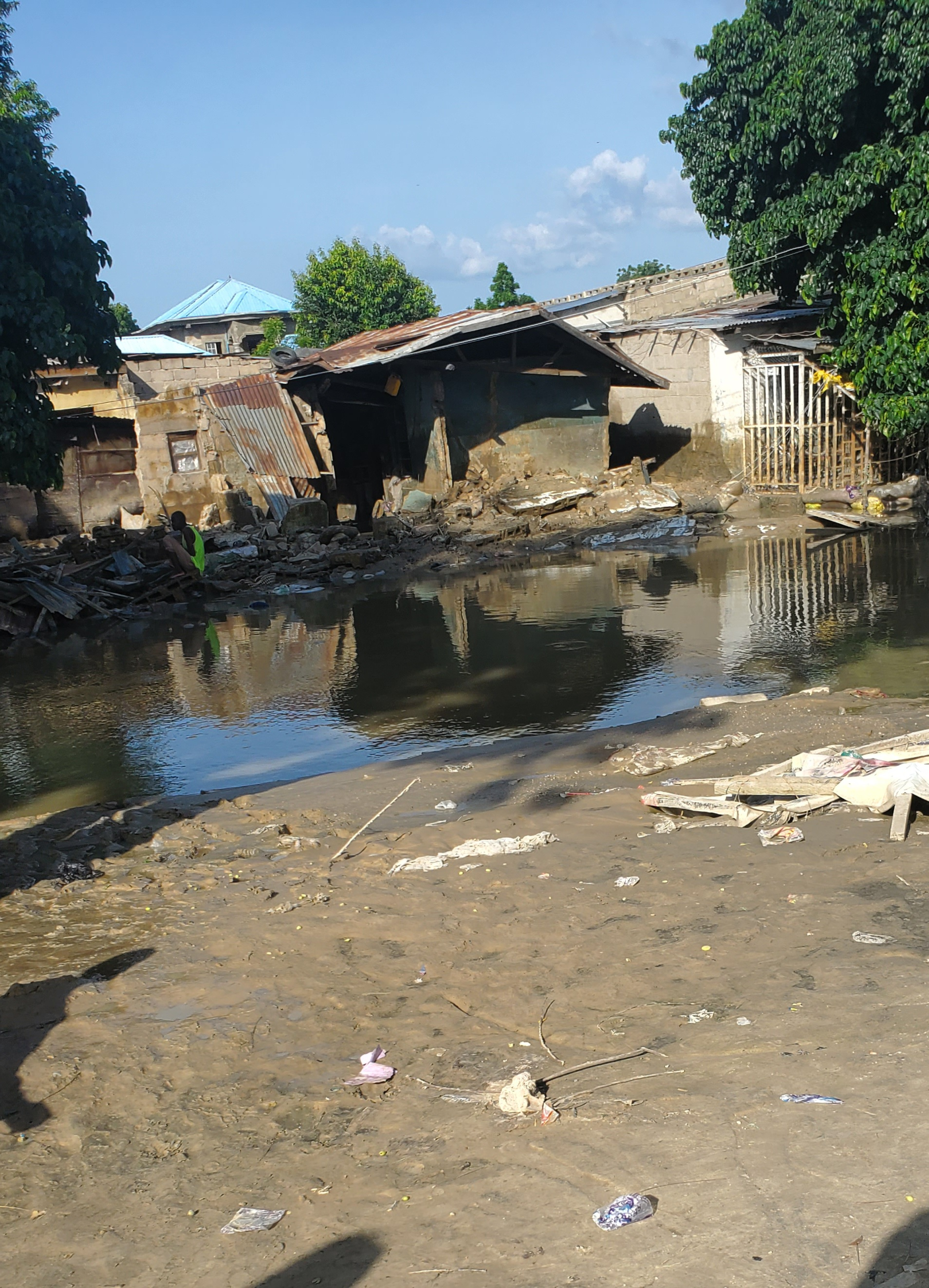

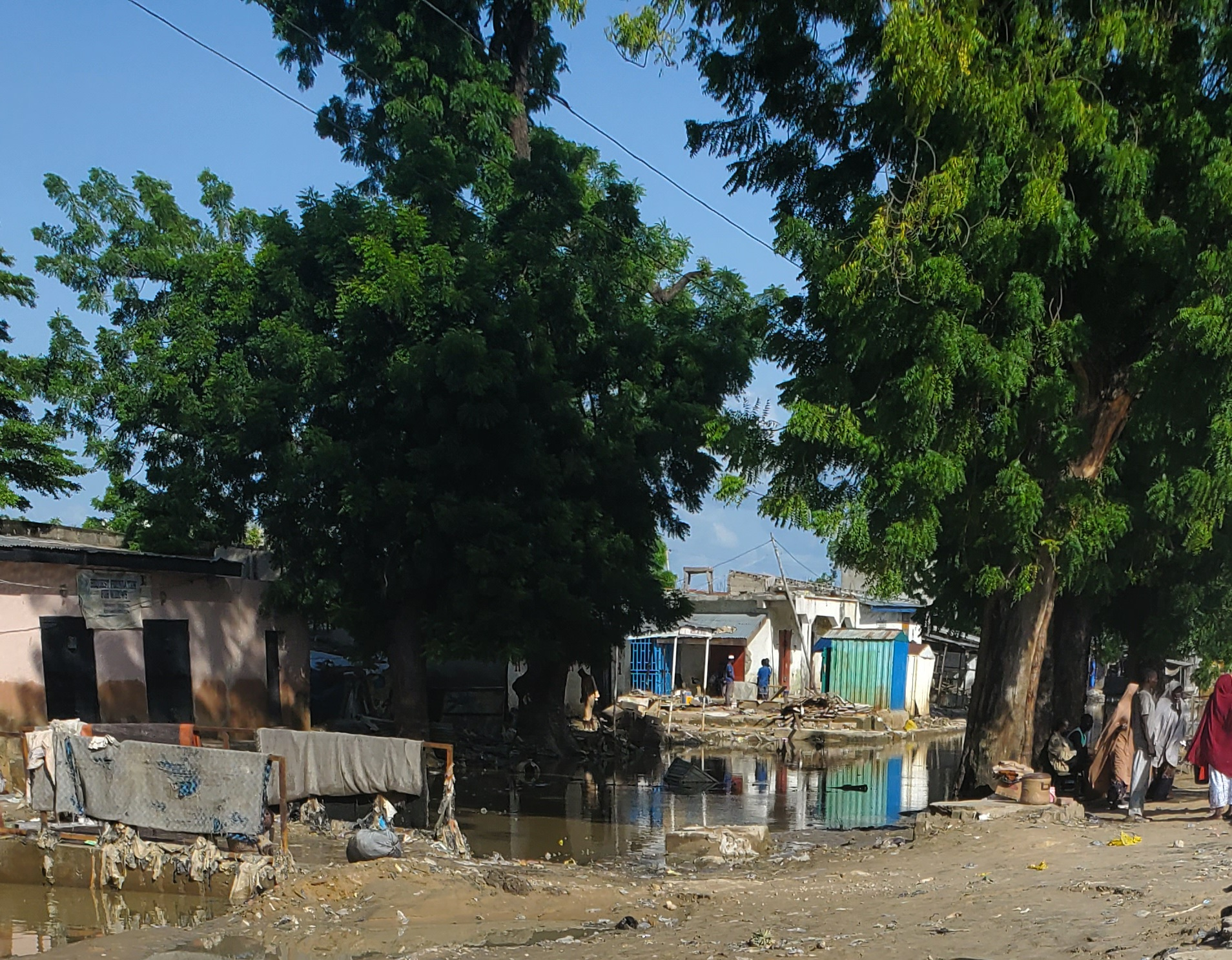

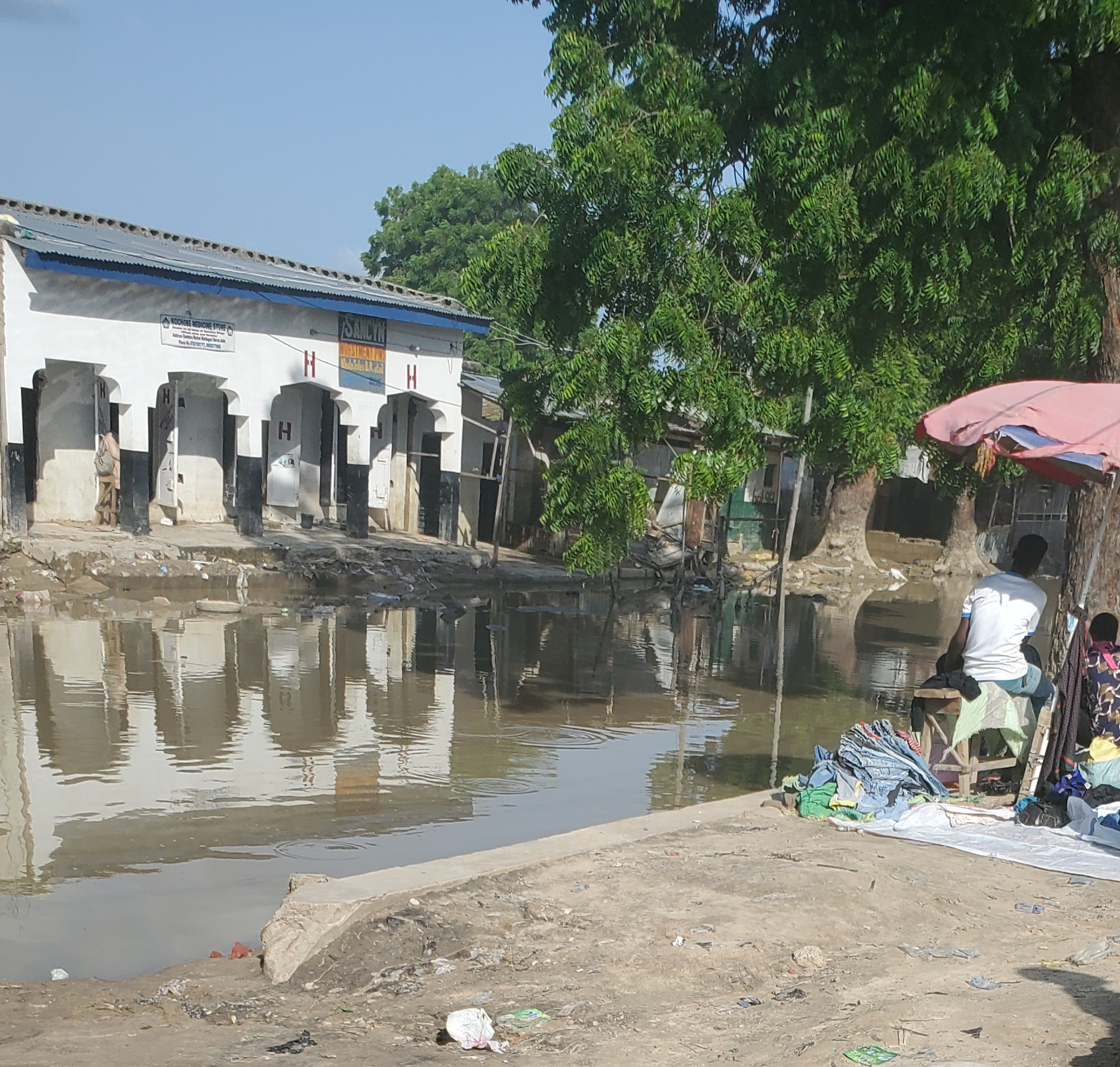

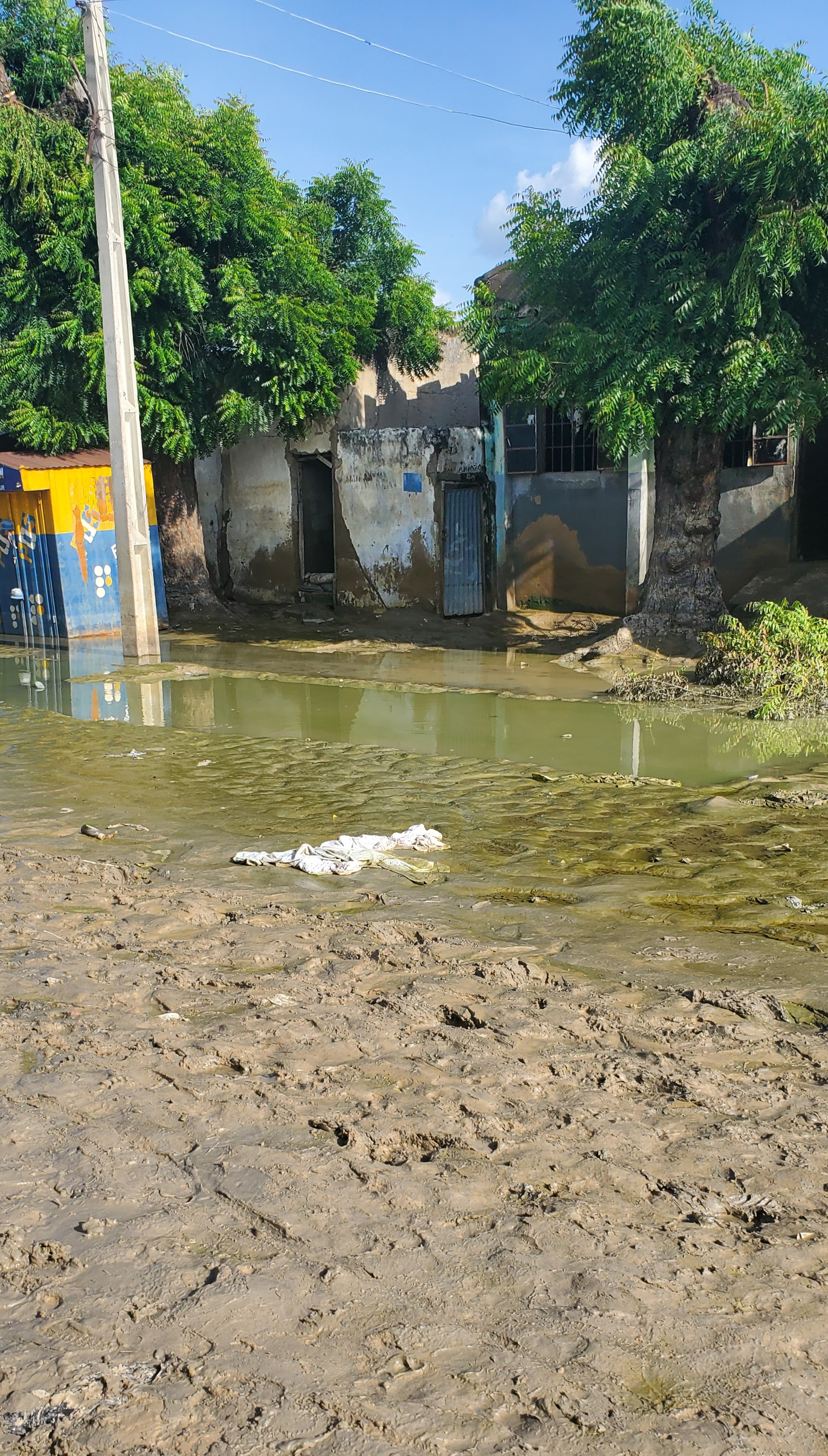

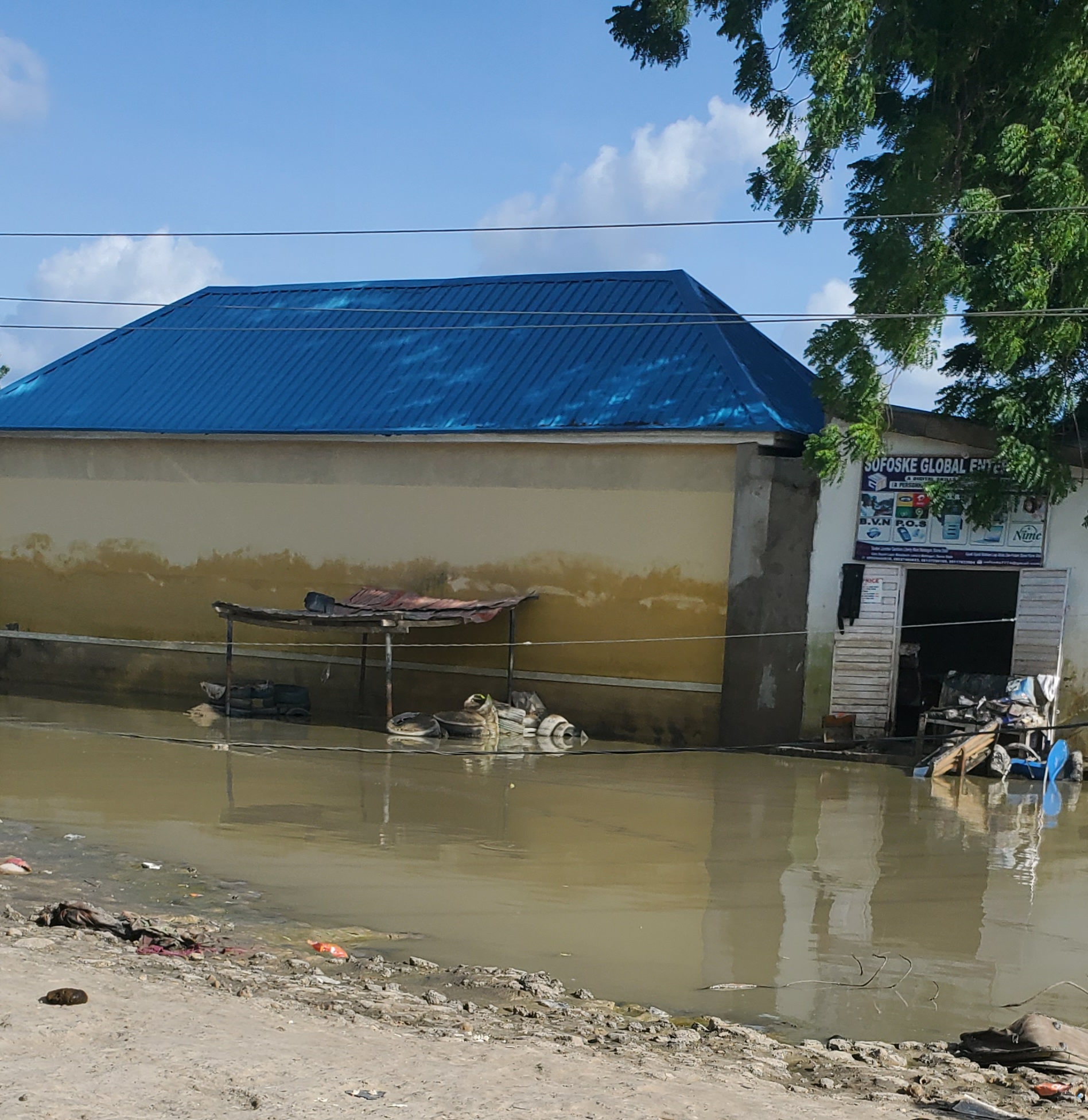

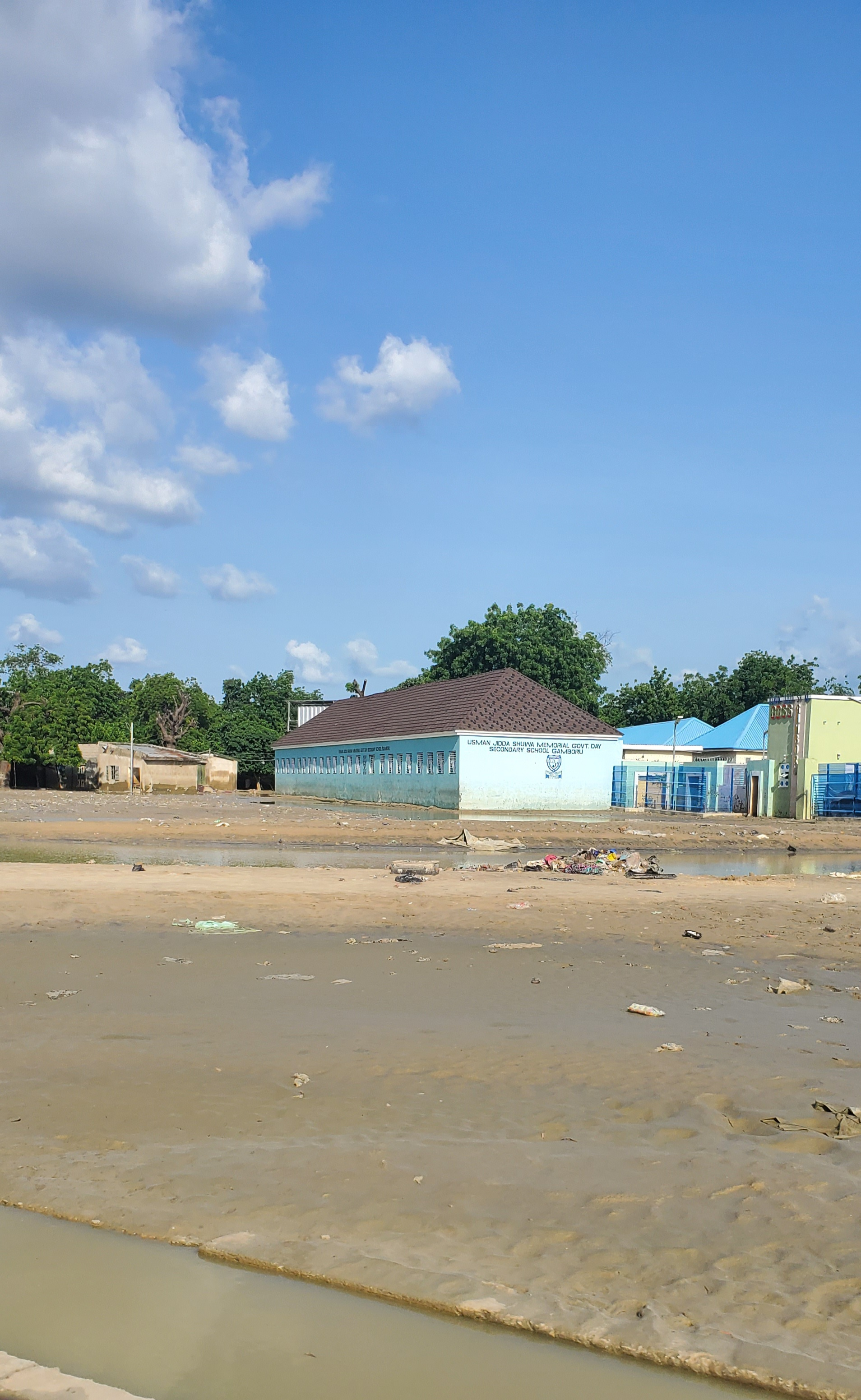

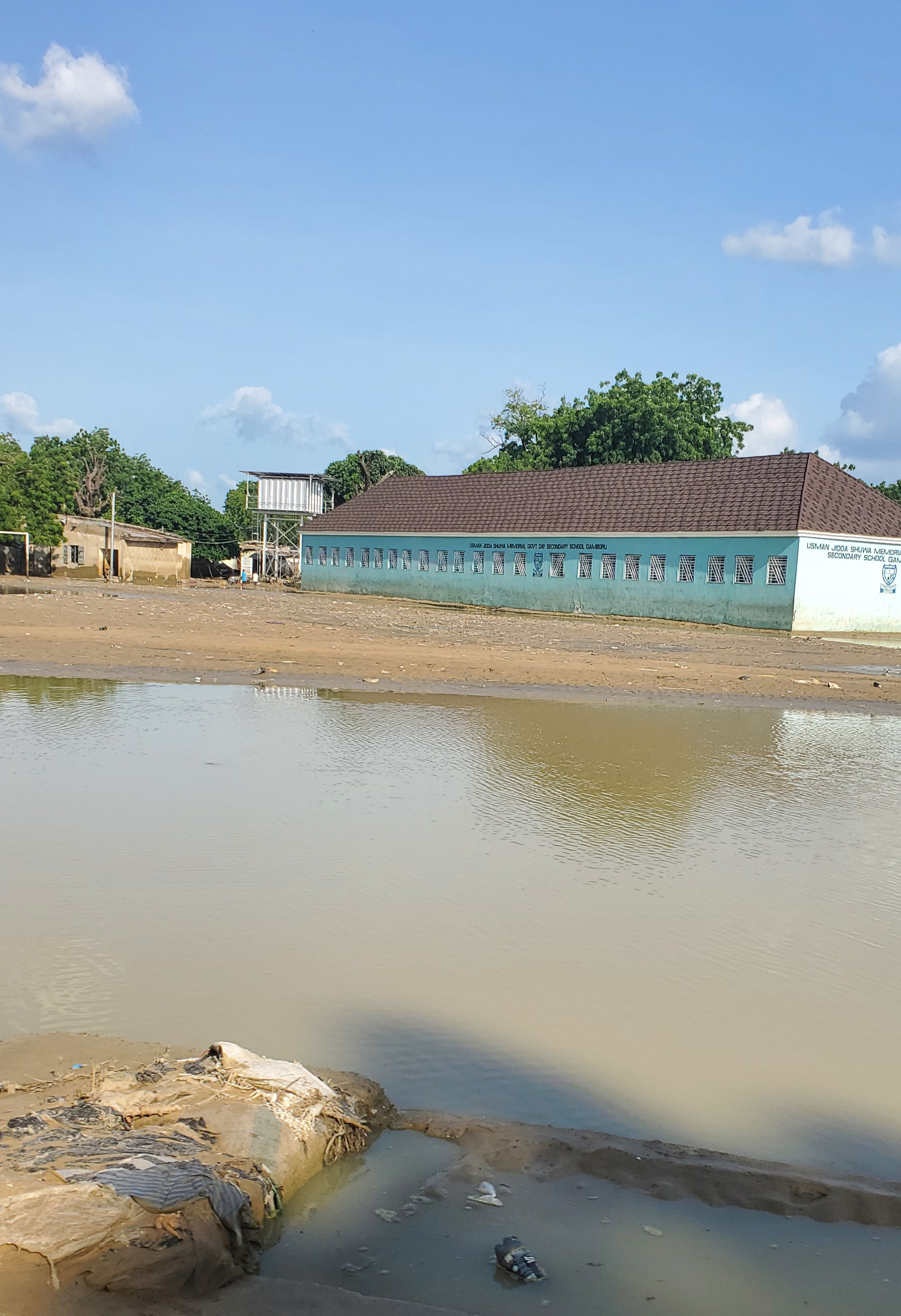

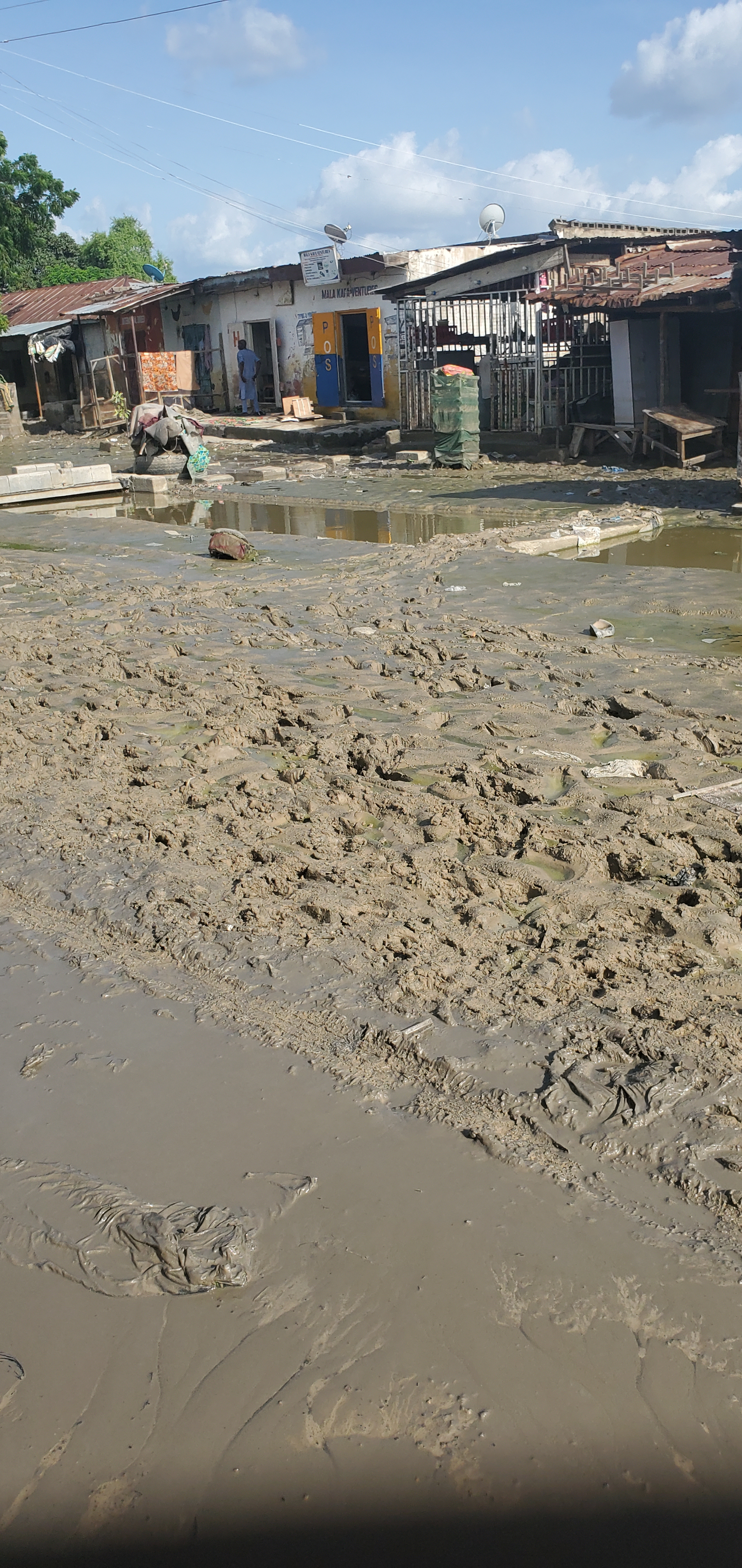

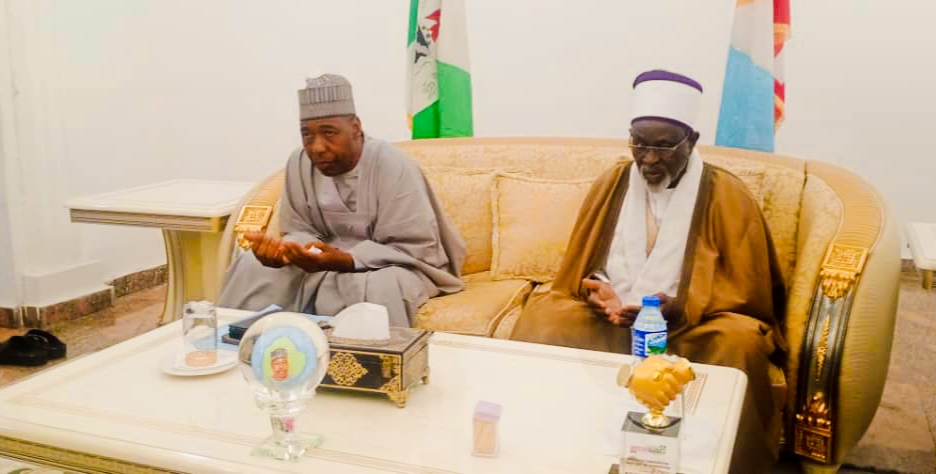
The Emir of Potiskum, Alhaji Umaru Bubaram, paid a visit to the Governor of Borno State, Professor Babagana Umara Zulum, to express his concern and solidarity over the severe flooding that has devastated parts of Maiduguri and surrounding areas.

== See also ==
- 2024 Lekki flood
- 2024 Nigeria floods
