= 2022 Adamawa State flood =

Flood disaster in Nigeria in 2022

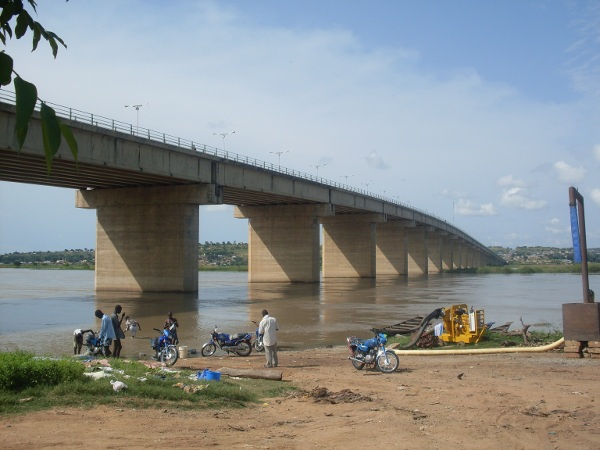
- Yola Bridge during the flood
- Date: September 2022
- Location: Adamawa State, Nigeria
- Cause: Heavy rainfall, River overflow, Dam spill
- Deaths: 25
- Property damage: Houses, farmlands and other properties

The 2022 Adamawa State flood was a natural disaster that occurred in Adamawa State, Nigeria, in September 2022. It affected over 30,000 square kilometres (12,000 mi^{2}) of land and exposed about 6.6 million people to potential risks. The flood was caused by heavy rainfall and increased water flows from the Cameroonian highlands. It resulted in 25 deaths, 58 injuries, and the displacement of 131,638 people. It also submerged 153 communities and damaged houses, farmlands and other properties. The flood highlighted the vulnerability of the region to such events and the need for better preparedness and mitigation measures.

In October 2023, the North-East region of Nigeria experienced a series of flood incidents, primarily attributed to water releases from the Lagdo Dam in Cameroon. According to a report by the International Organization for Migration (IOM), this event resulted in significant infrastructure damage, displacing more than 8,504 households and killing 33 individuals, predominantly women, children, and the elderly.

== Causes ==
The 2022 Adamawa State flood was caused by a combination of factors, including heavy rainfall, river overflows, and dam spills in Cameroon during the rainy season. According to the report from the National Emergency Management Agency (NEMA), this event led to severe flooding in 31 out of the 36 federal states of Nigeria, with Adamawa being among the worst affected.

One of the main causes of the flood was the increased water flows from the Cameroonian highlands, which drained into the Benue River and its tributaries. The water level of the Benue River rose significantly, exceeding its normal capacity and overflowing its banks. The situation was worsened by the release of water from the Lagdo Dam in Cameroon, which added more pressure to the already swollen river.

Another cause of the flood was the heavy rainfall that occurred in Adamawa State and other parts of Nigeria during the rainy season. The rainfall exceeded the average annual precipitation and saturated the soil, reducing its infiltration capacity and increasing surface runoff. The runoff collected in low-lying areas and formed flash floods that swept away houses, farmlands, and other properties.

== Impact ==
The 2022 Adamawa State flood had a devastating impact on the lives and livelihoods of the people in the affected areas. According to NEMA, as of September 2022, the flood resulted in 25 reported fatalities and left 58 people critically injured. An additional 131,638 individuals were displaced from their homes and sought refuge in camps or with relatives and friends. The flood also submerged 153 communities across 12 Local Government Areas (LGAs) within Adamawa State, affecting about 260,000 people.

The flood also caused extensive damage to infrastructure, agriculture, and other sectors. It destroyed or damaged houses, roads, bridges, schools, health facilities, and other public amenities. It also washed away crops, livestock, food stocks, and other assets. The flood disrupted economic activities, such as farming, fishing, trading, and transportation. It also increased the risk of waterborne diseases, such as cholera and typhoid.

According to NEMA, the flooding in 2023 resulted in the displacement of numerous inhabitants, risking croplands and infrastructure. In total, 159,157 individuals were affected, 28 people died, and 48,168 people were displaced in 13 states across Nigeria.

== Humanitarian response ==
In response to the flood situation, a collaborative multi-sectoral Rapid Needs Assessment (RNA) was initiated by NEMA and other humanitarian actors to address knowledge gaps and coordinate humanitarian efforts. The RNA aimed to provide a comprehensive overview of the needs, vulnerabilities, capacities, and gaps in the affected areas. The RNA covered six sectors: shelter and non-food items (NFIs), food security and livelihoods (FSL), health, water sanitation and hygiene (WASH), protection, and education.

Based on the RNA findings, NEMA and other humanitarian partners provided emergency assistance to the affected population. This included distributing relief items such as tents, mattresses, blankets, mosquito nets, cooking utensils, hygiene kits, and food rations. It also included providing health services, such as mobile clinics, immunization, and disease surveillance. It also included improving water supply, sanitation, and hygiene facilities, such as boreholes, latrines, and handwashing stations. It also included supporting protection activities, such as registering and tracing displaced persons, providing psychosocial support, and preventing gender-based violence. It also included restoring education services, such as rehabilitating schools, providing learning materials, and training teachers.

== Ongoing monitoring ==
The circumstances surrounding this flooding were reported to continue to be closely monitored, and further updates on the situation are anticipated. A team from the National Emergency Management Agency, Adamawa State Emergency Management Agency, and Nigeria Hydrological Services Agency conducted an assessment tour to the Bakin Kogi river in Jimeta to monitor water levels for potential flooding. The water level was found to be 8.0 meters at 10.00 am on 30 August 2023. The team then contacted the Marine Unit of Nigeria Police Force for assistance in responding to the flood emergency.
