= Sanda Kyarimi Park Zoo =

Zoo in Maiduguri, Borno State, Nigeria

Coordinates: 11°49′55″N 13°08′51″E

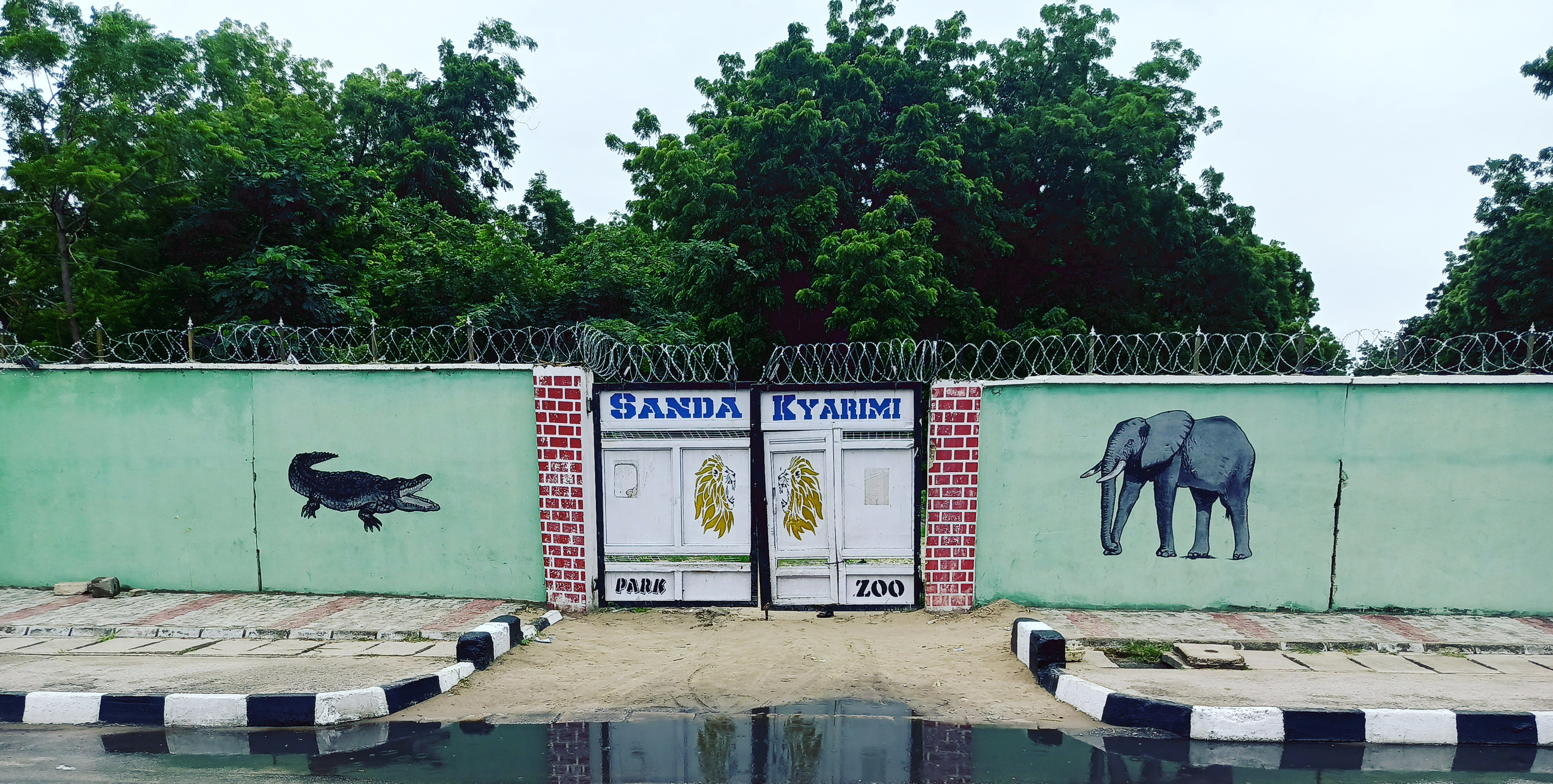
- Entrance
- Interactive map of Sanda Kyarimi Park Zoo
- Date opened: 1970
- Location: Maiduguri, Borno State, Nigeria
- Land area: 17 hectares (200,000 yd^{2})

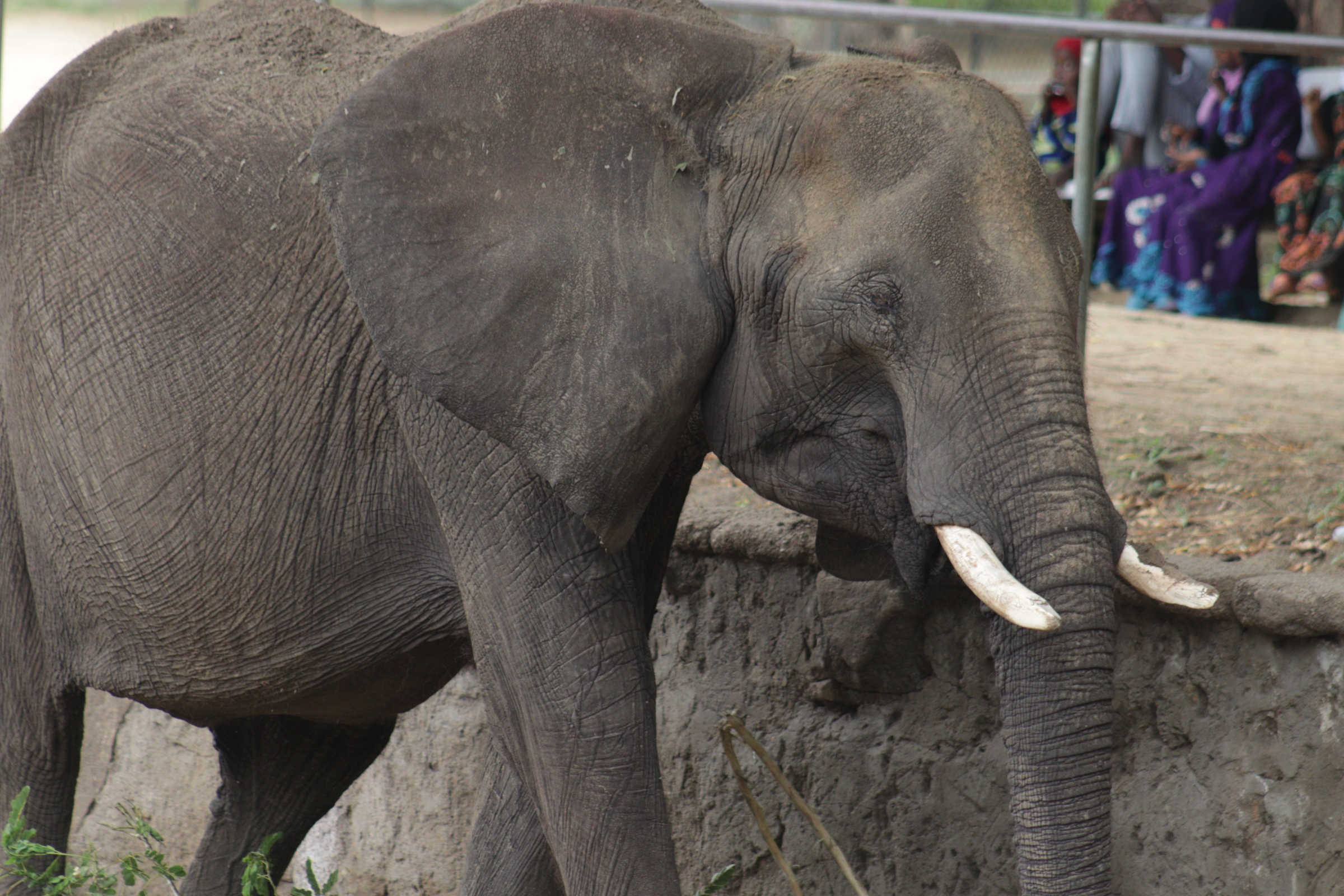
An elephant in Sanda Kyarimi Zoo Park

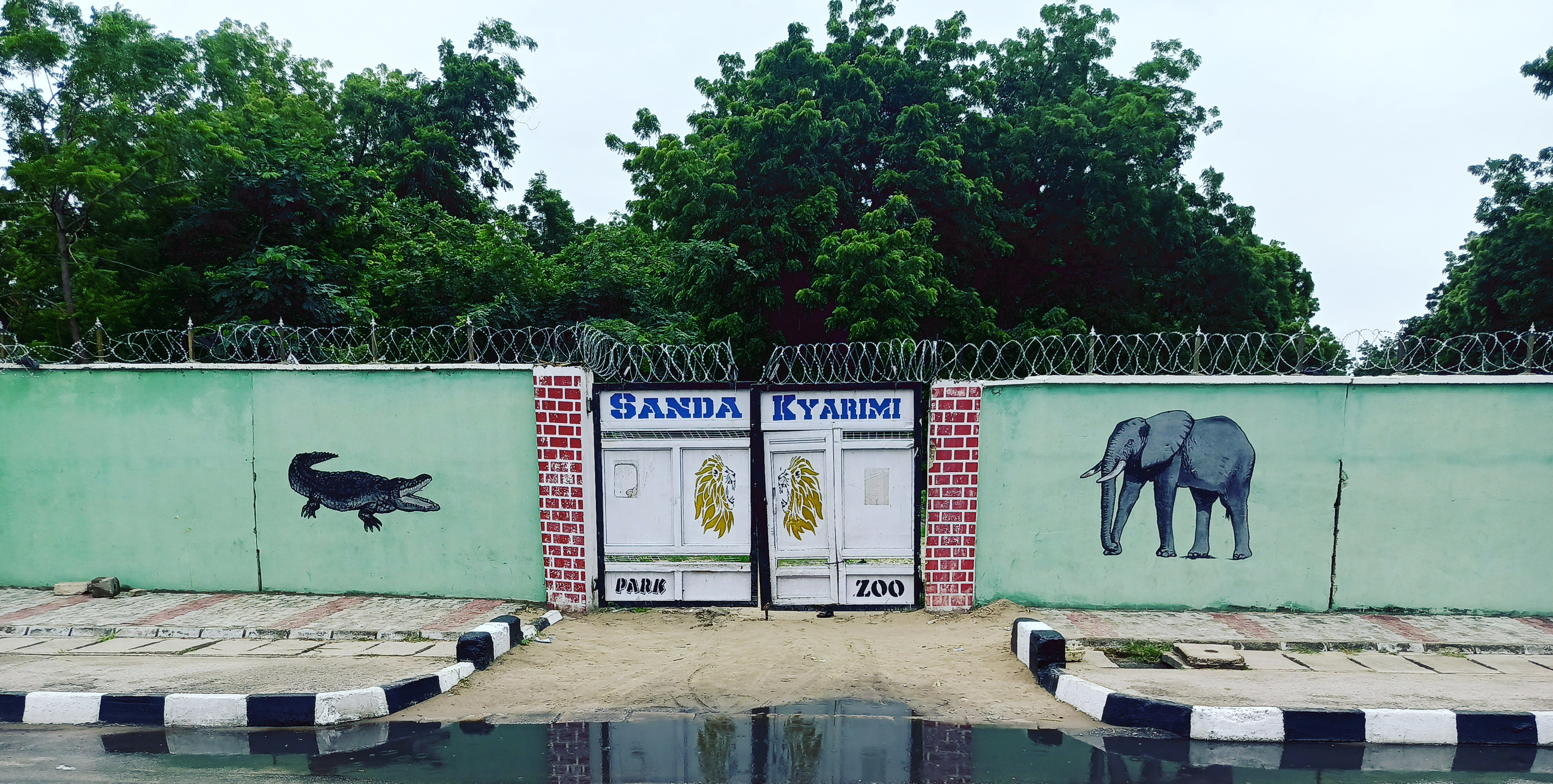
Sanda Kyarimi Zoo Park Gate

The Sanda Kyarimi Park Zoo is a 17-hectare (200,000 yd^{2}) zoological garden and wildlife sanctuary located in Maiduguri, Borno State, Nigeria. It is one of the oldest zoological gardens in Nigeria, established in 1970. It is considered the only public facility in Borno for the conservation of endangered animal species. The zoo houses and displays wild animals like lions, ostriches, crocodiles, pythons, elephants, white hyenas, buffalos and many species of birds, including the turning eagle and the marabou stork.

== History ==
The Sanda Kyarimi Park is named after Shehu Sanda Kyarimi the former Shehu of Borno who reigned from 1937 to 1967 and was initially established as a forest reserve in the year 1970; two years before the establishment of Audu Bako Zoological Garden in Kano, then it was later advanced into a large wildlife sanctuary and a botanical park.

In September 2024, the zoo said that over 80% of its animals had been killed in floods, and said that some animals, including crocodiles and snakes, had escaped due to floods caused by the Alau Dam collapse.

== Gallery ==
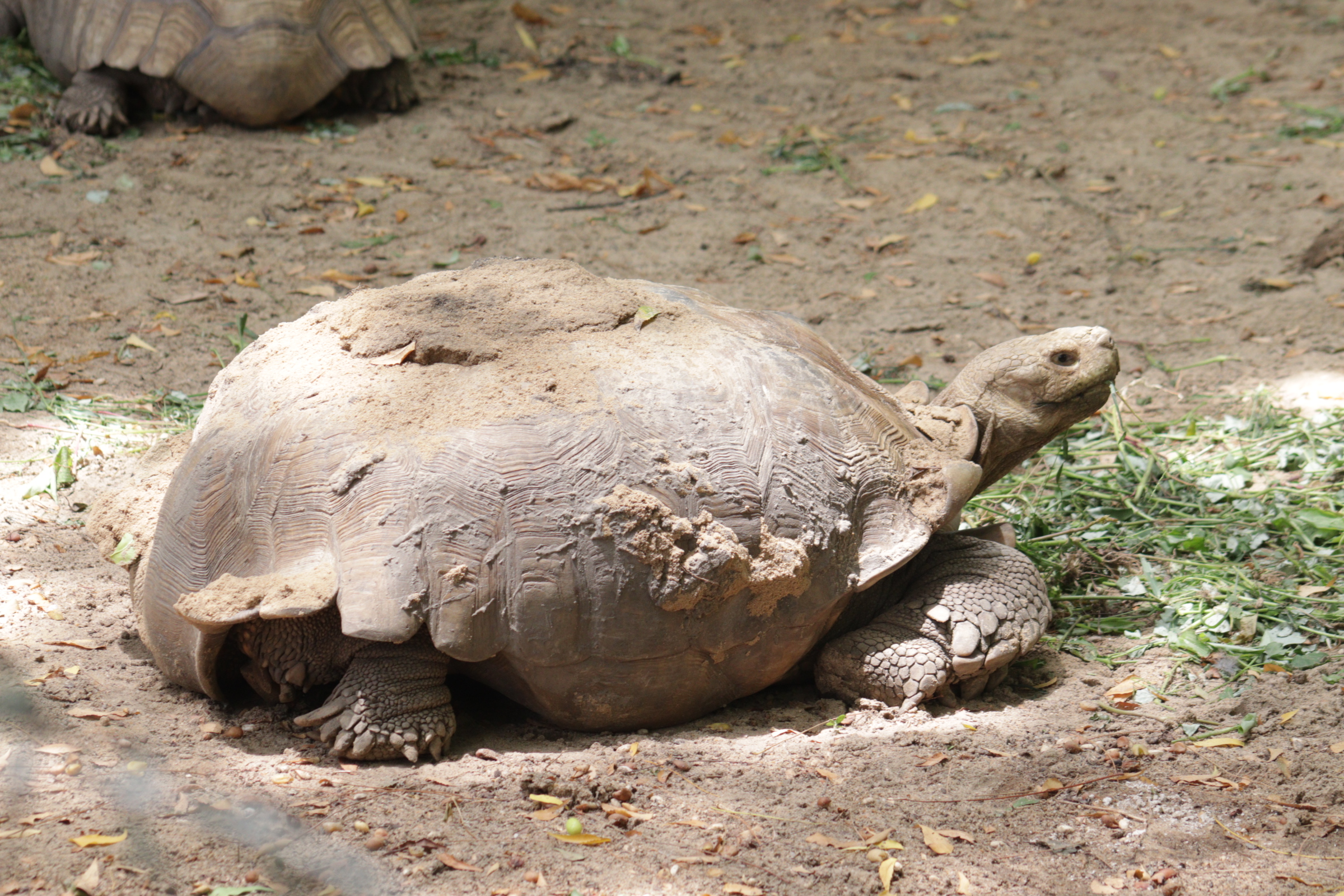
A tortoise in Sanda Kyarimi Park Zoo

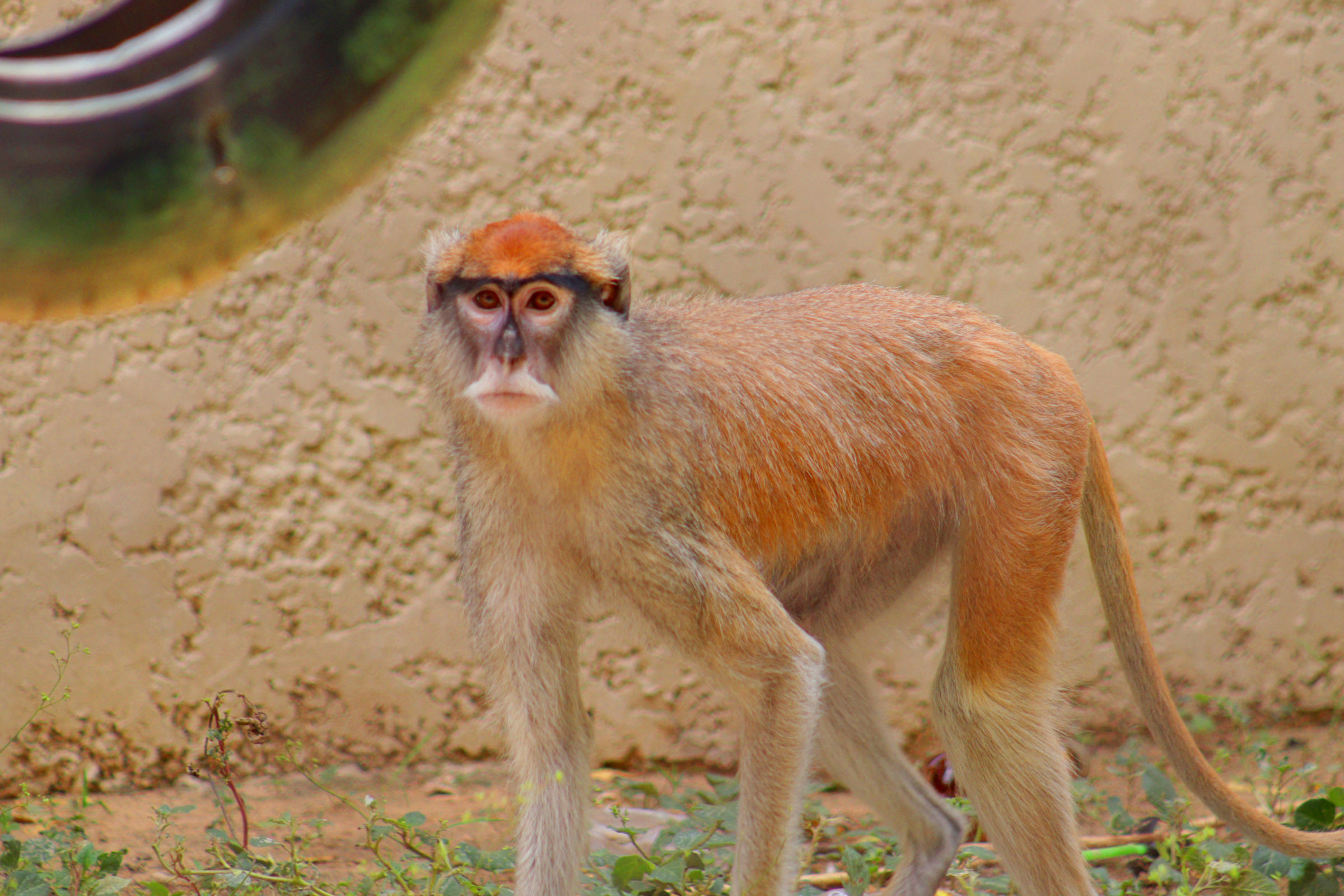
A monkey in Sanda Kyarimi Park Zoo

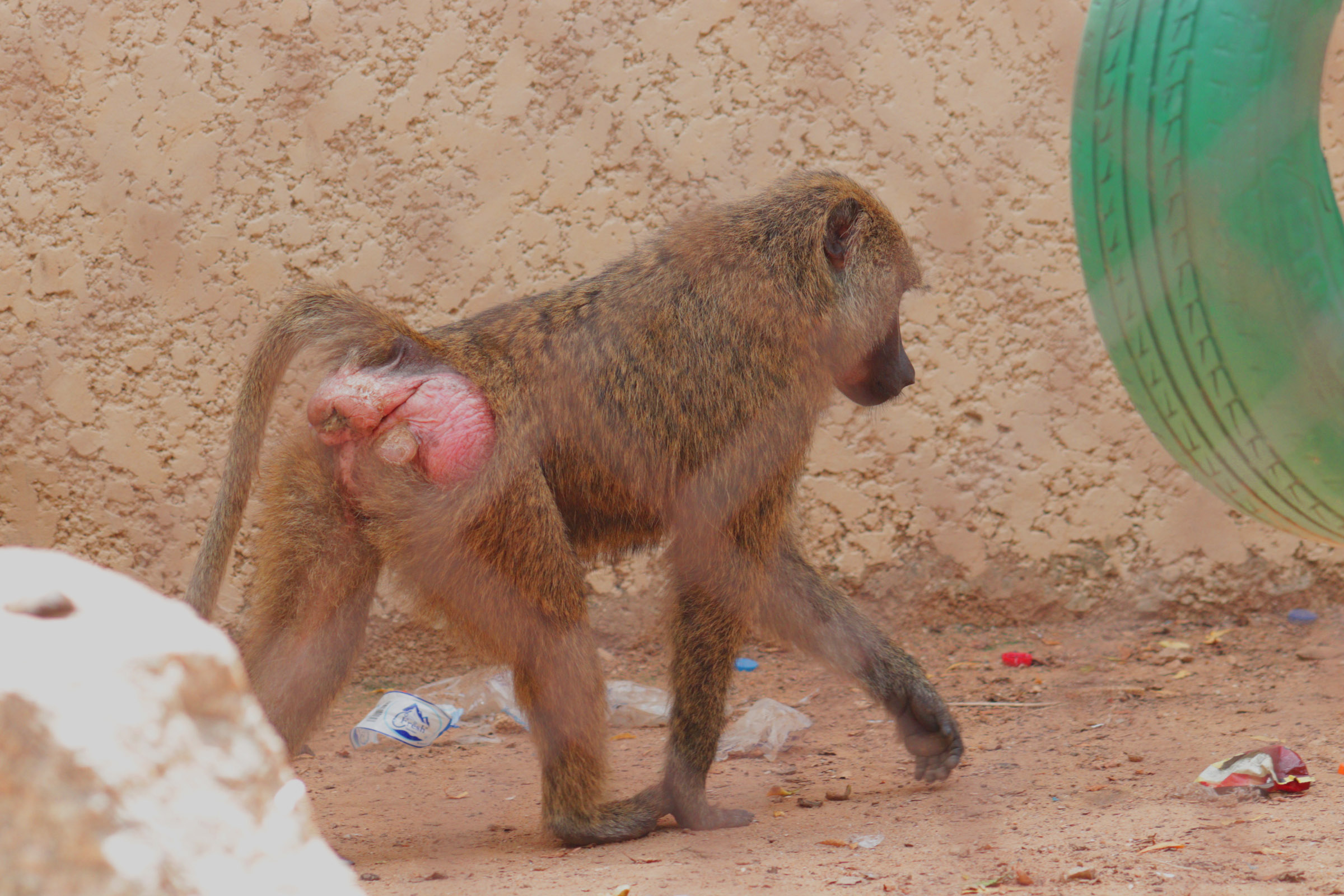
A baboon in Sanda Kyarimo Park Zoo
