= Ngadda River =

River in Nigeria

Coordinates: 12°40′N 13°50′E

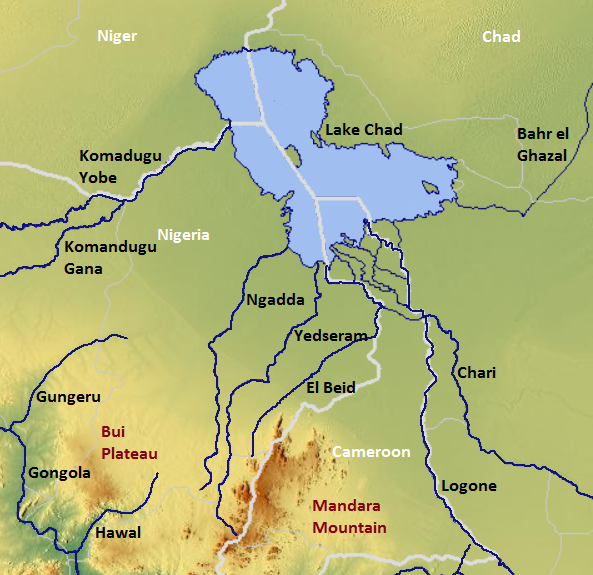
The Ngadda River shown on a map of Lake Chad.

The Ngadda River (sometimes Ngadabul) is a seasonal river in Nigeria that flows into Lake Chad and the Chad Basin. The Alau Dam built on the river has interfered with fertile seasonal floodplains in the region of Maiduguri.

== 2024 Flood ==
Following floods in 2024, the River Ngadabul in Maiduguri, Borno State, reportedly yielded no fewer than 15 bodies, according to the National Emergency Management Agency, NEMA. This was confirmed by Muhammad Usman, the NEMA North East Coordinator, in an interview with the News Agency of Nigeria (NAN) in Maiduguri.

== Pollution ==
The Ngadda River receives all sorts of waste from residential houses, it is also contaminated with metal pollutants. River Ngadda is a significant waterway inside Maiduguri city. Its fields and banks are known to have various activities and assets. At the point when the waterway spills over its shores, adjoining other neighboring, lands could face obliteration, and there could be loss of lives and properties when these occurs.
