= Jebba Hydroelectric Power Station =

Power station in Nigeria

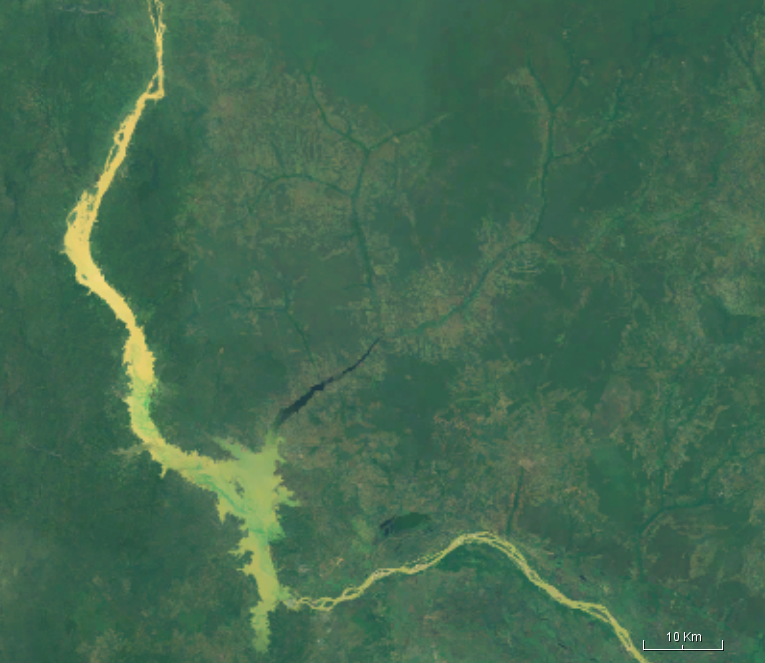

- Map of Nigeria showing the location of Jebba Hydroelectric Power Station. Jebba Hydroelectric Power Station (Africa) Jebba Hydroelectric Power Station (Earth)
- Country: Nigeria
- Location: Kwara State/Niger State
- Coordinates: 09°08′08″N 04°47′16″E
- Purpose: Power
- Status: Operational
- Opening date: 13 April 1985
- Owner: Federal Government of Nigeria
- Operator: Mainstream Energy

Dam and spillways
- Impounds: Niger River

Power Station
- Operator: Mainstream Energy
- Commission date: 13 April 1985
- Turbines: 6 x 96.4 MW
- Installed capacity: 578.4 megawatts (775,600 hp)

The Jebba Hydroelectric Power Station, also Jebba Power Station, is a hydroelectric power plant across the Niger River in Nigeria. It has a power generating capacity of 578.4 megawatts, enough to power over 364,000 homes. The plant was commissioned on 13 April 1985, although commercial energy production began in 1983.

== Location ==
The Jebba Power Station is located about 100 kilometres (62 mi) downstream of the Kainji Dam, and approximately 40 kilometres (25 mi) southwest of Mokwa, the nearest urban centre.

This is approximately 256 kilometres (159 mi) by road, southwest of Minna, the capital of Niger State. The power station sits astride the Niger River at the border between Niger State and Kwara State, approximately 91.5 kilometres (57 mi), by road, northeast of Ilorin, the capital city of Kwara State. Jebba Dam sits at an elevation of 71.917 metres (236 ft) above mean sea level.

== Overview ==
The power station, owned by the Federal Government of Nigeria comprises six generation turbines, each with a rated capacity of 96.4 MW (129,300 hp), for a maximum installed output of 578.4 MW (775,600 hp). The concession agreement for operations and maintenance at this power station is held by Mainstream Energy Solutions Limited, an independent power company. Mainstream Energy also holds the concession on the 760 MW (1,020,000 hp) Kainji Hydroelectric Power Station, located about 100 kilometres (62 mi). upstream of Jebba Power Station. Five of the generation units are available, as of January 2021. The sixth generation unit is inoperable, since it was damaged by a fire in April 2009.

== Repairs and renovation ==
In January 2021, Andritz AG, an Austrian engineering conglomerate, was selected by Mainstream Energy to repair the defective turbine and restore to power station to maximum capacity.

The electrical-mechanical works include: (a) replacement of the 96.4 MW (129,300 hp) turbine (b) installation of a new 103MVA generator (c) installation of a new transformer (d) installation of a new outdoor switchyard and (e) replacement of accessory equipment, including the intake gate.

The repairs and renovations are expected to cost approximately NGN13.68 billion (US$36 million or €30million). Renovation work is expected to last until the first quarter of 2024.
