= Alau Dam =

Dam in Borno State, Nigeria

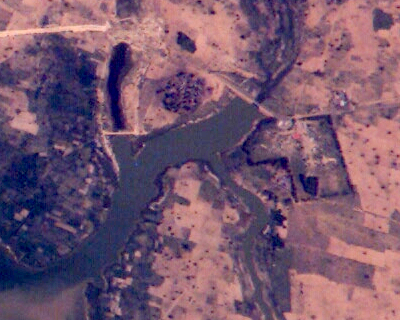
- View of the dam from the International Space Station in 2005.
- Interactive map of Alau Dam
- Location: Borno State, Nigeria
- Coordinates: 11°43′27″N 13°17′06″E
- Construction began: 1984
- Opening date: 1986
- Demolition date: September 10, 2024 (destroyed in a flood)

Dam and spillways
- Impounds: Ngadda River

Reservoir
- Creates: Lake Alau
- Total capacity: 112 million cubic metres (4.0 billion cubic feet)

The Alau Dam was situated in the Alau community of Konduga local government area of Borno State in the Northeast region of Nigeria, constructed in 1984–1986. It impounds a major reservoir on the Ngadda River, one of the tributaries of the Lake Chad. In 2024, the dam collapsed, causing catastrophic flooding in Borno State and killing over 150 people, with at least 419,000 people displaced.

== Flows ==
The inflow of water into Alau and Jere Bowl depends mainly on the natural inflow of the Ngadda River, which is seasonal. The Ngadda River is a tributary of the larger Yedzeram River, which originates in the Hudu Hills east of Mubi and flows northwest to Lake Chad. During the wet season, the Yedzeram River contributes a massive inflow of water into the Ngadda River, which then flows into Alau and Jere Bowl. However, during years of low rainfall, the Yedzeram River does not contribute as much water to the Ngalda River, and the inflow into Alau and Jere Bowl can be significantly reduced.

Alau Dam receives water from the Yedzram and Gombole rivers which meet at the Sambisa Forest and flow as the Ngadda river into the dam. Alau Dam receives a wide variety of waste from agricultural lands. Its reservoir was also used for commercial fishing.

== History ==
The Alau Dam was constructed in 1984–1986 to provide water for irrigation and domestic use in Maiduguri. The dam also helps to control flooding in the area. However, the dam has also been the cause of flooding in some cases. In 1992, the dam reached its maximum storage level and spilled over, causing flooding in Jere Bowl. In 1994, a flash flood from the Yedzeram River caused extensive flooding in Maiduguri. In 2012, torrential rainfall caused the Alau Dam to open its evacuation valve, releasing a massive amount of water that caused flooding in Maiduguri and surrounding areas.

== Collapse ==
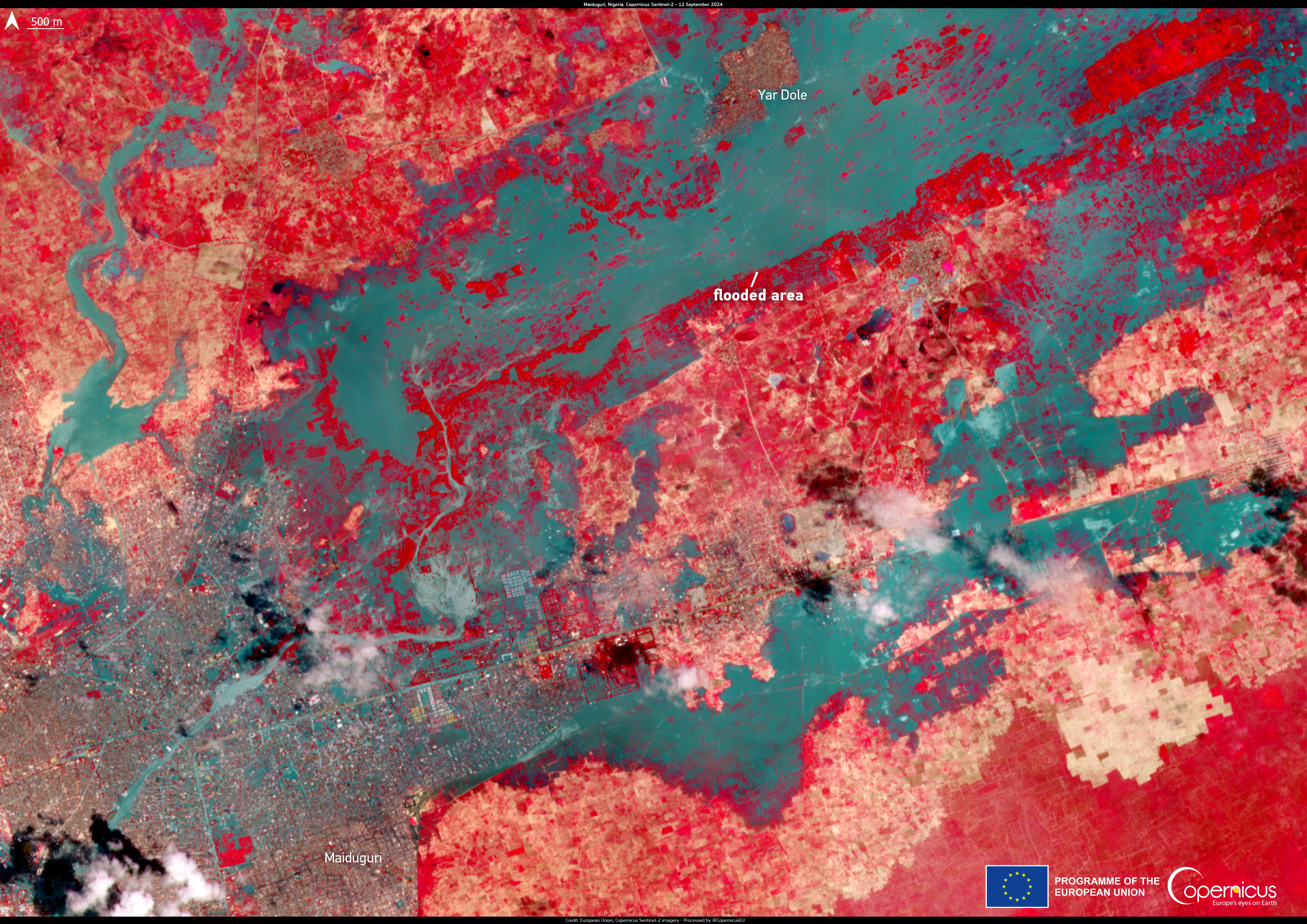
False-color satellite picture of the floods taken by Sentinel-2, 12 September 2024.

On 9 September 2024, the dam collapsed following heavy rains, resulting in floods that inundated up to 15% of Maiduguri and killed more than 80% of the animals in the Sanda Kyarimi Park Zoo. At least 150 people were killed due to flooding in the area. Several hundred thousand people were displaced from their homes in Maiduguri. Although the federal government announced an ₦80 billion rehabilitation project for the dam after the collapse, delays and minimal progress by mid-2025 leaves the area vulnerable to future flooding.

== Area ==
Alau Dam was 9 metres (30 ft) high with a square reservoir area of about 50 kilometres (31 mi). The maximum storage capacity is 112 million cubic metres (4.0 billion cubic feet).
