= 2024 Nigeria floods =

Flooding disaster in Nigeria 2024

2024 flooding in Nigeria
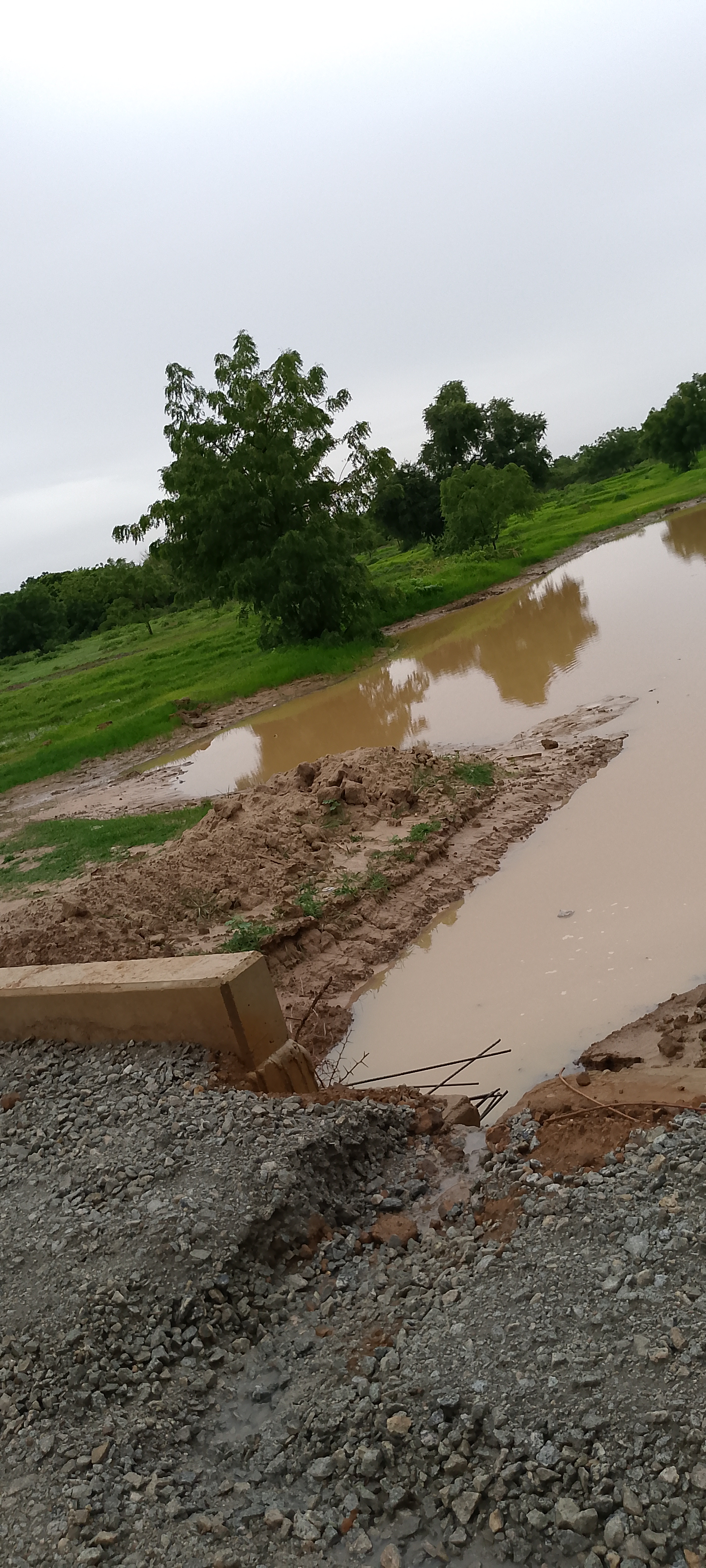
- Flooding in Azare, Bauchi State, Nigeria
- Date: 2024
- Location: Abuja, Bauchi State, Borno State, Lagos State, Kano State, 31 total states
- Cause: Heavy rainfall
- Deaths: 1,200+
- Injuries: 2,712+

Flooding in Nigeria has become a yearly occurrence that claims lives and destroys many properties. According to the Minister of Water Resources and Sanitation, Joseph Utsev, following two flood-related deaths in Abuja in July 2024, the rains have persisted, causing property and business disruption in the midst of a crippling economy where rising food costs are making matters worse for Nigerians.

== Causes ==
As the rain increased on Thursday, 4 July 2024, the Federal Government reported that 10 states as well as the Federal Capital Territory, Abuja, had either experienced varying degrees of flooding or had reported casualties. Nigerian flooding is a complex problem caused by both natural and man-made causes. The main natural cause is excessive rainfall, which overwhelms many cities' drainage systems.

== Flooding by location ==
=== Abuja ===
Floods caused two fatalities in Abuja and the rains continued. This resulted in property and business destruction in Abuja metropolis.Flood

=== Lagos ===
In the Mushin neighborhood of Lagos, the ensuing floods destroyed a two-story structure and overpowered the locals, preventing students from attending school in several areas of the state. A student was carried away by the floods in the Ketu area of Lagos State.

=== Borno State ===
On 10 September, the Alau Dam collapsed, causing floods in Borno State, killing at least 150 people, displacing 419,000 others and causing the community to submerge 70%.

=== Bauchi State ===
A flood in Bauchi State caused the deaths of 24 people, the injuries of at least 163 others and caused 122,330 others to be displaced.

=== Other ===
31 states have been affected by flooding, causing hundreds of deaths, injuring thousands of others and affecting 1.2 million.
