= Ketu, Nigeria =

Ketu is a city within the Metropolitan city of Lagos, Nigeria. It is close to Mile 12. The place has a branch of Foursquare Gospel Church and many other religious institutions.

Agboyi-Ketu Local Council Development Area (LCDA) is one of the fifty-seven local government areas of Lagos State, Nigeria. Its headquarter is located in Alapere.

The local government was created by former government of Lagos State, Asiwaju Bola Ahmed Tinubu, who served from May 29, 1999 to May 29, 2007.

It shares boundary with Ikosi-Isheri Local Council Development Area (LCDA), Kosofe Local Government and Ikorodu West Local Council Development Area (LCDA).

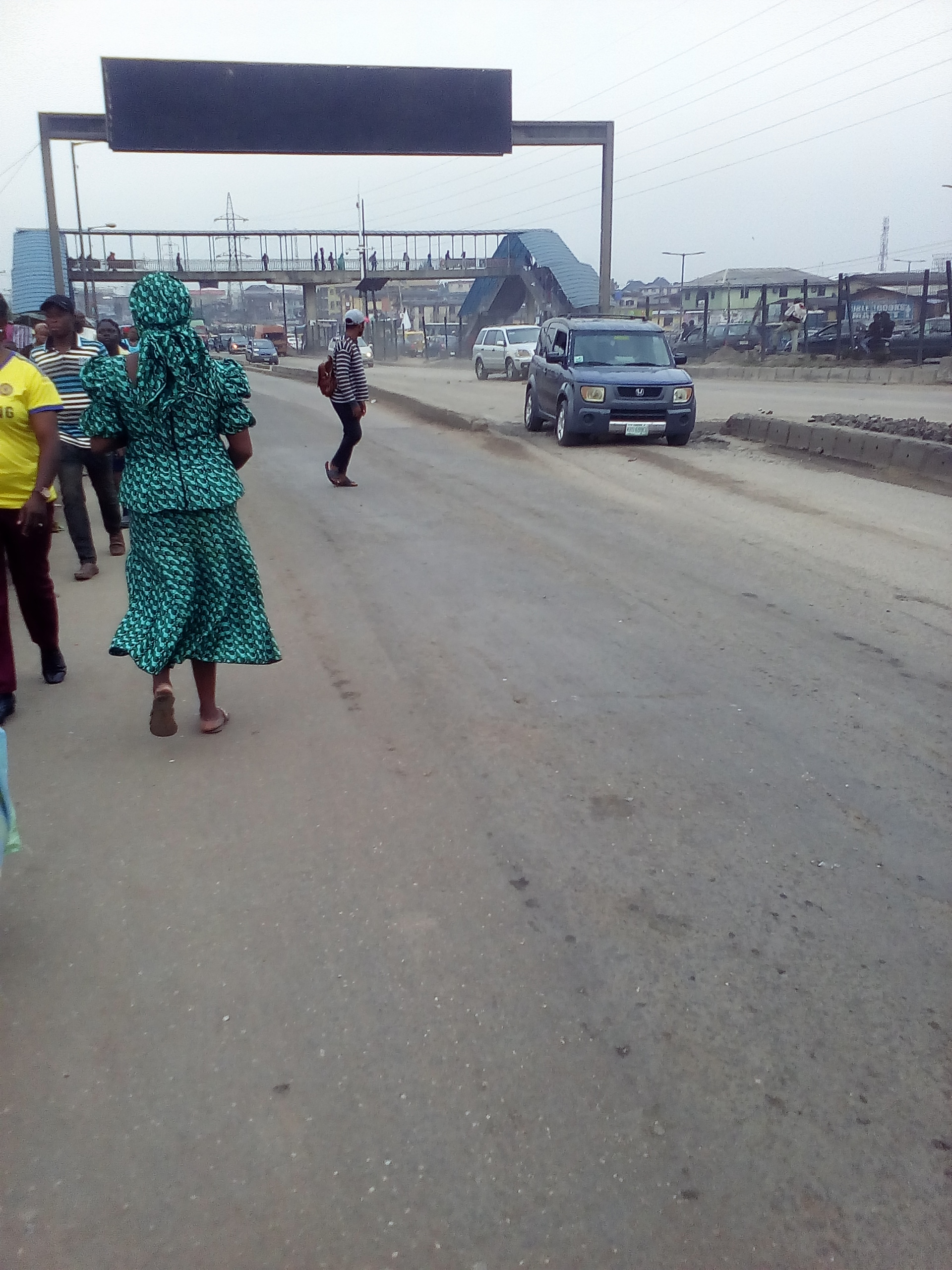
Ketu Bus stop

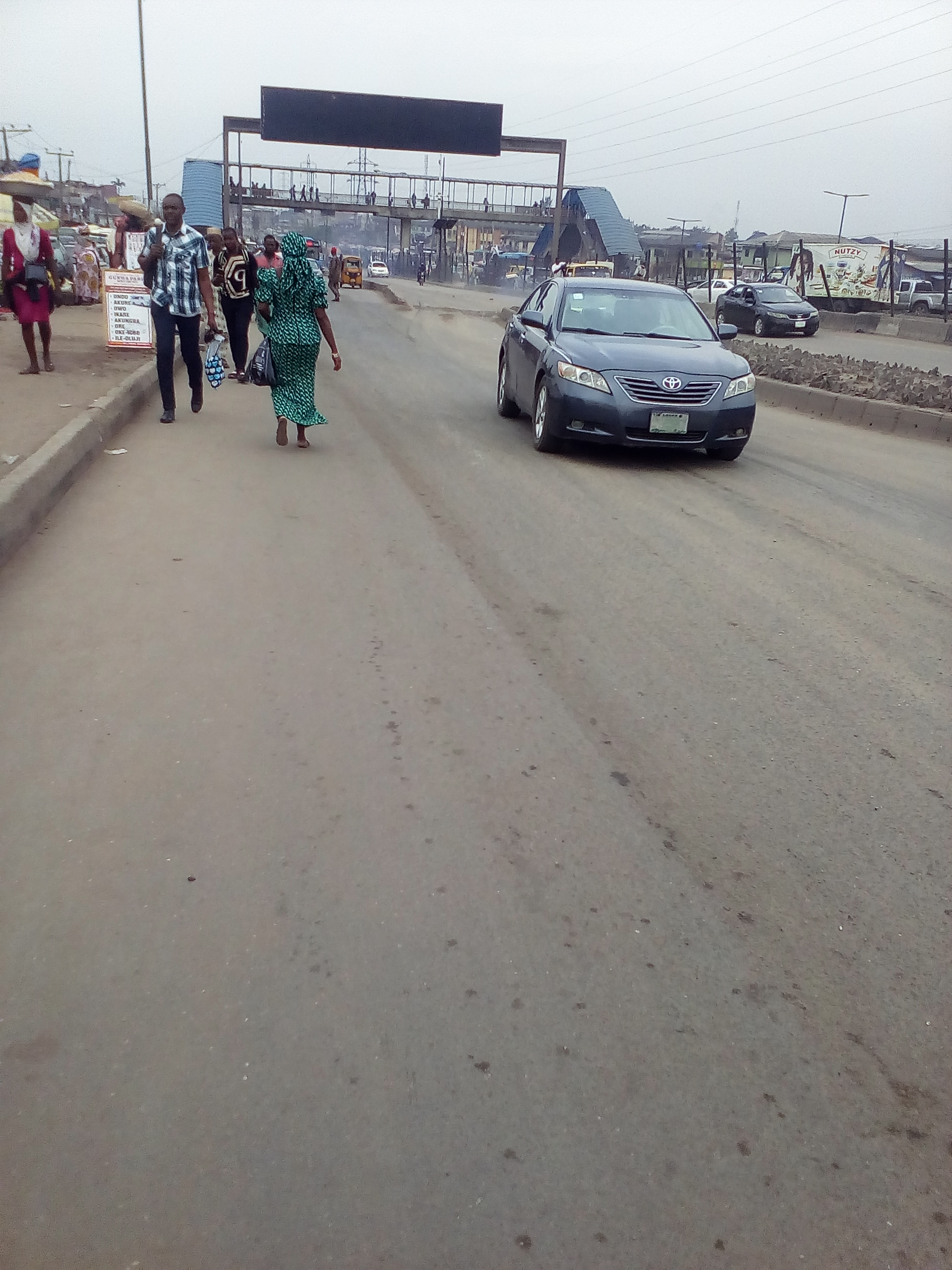
Ikorodu road, lagos

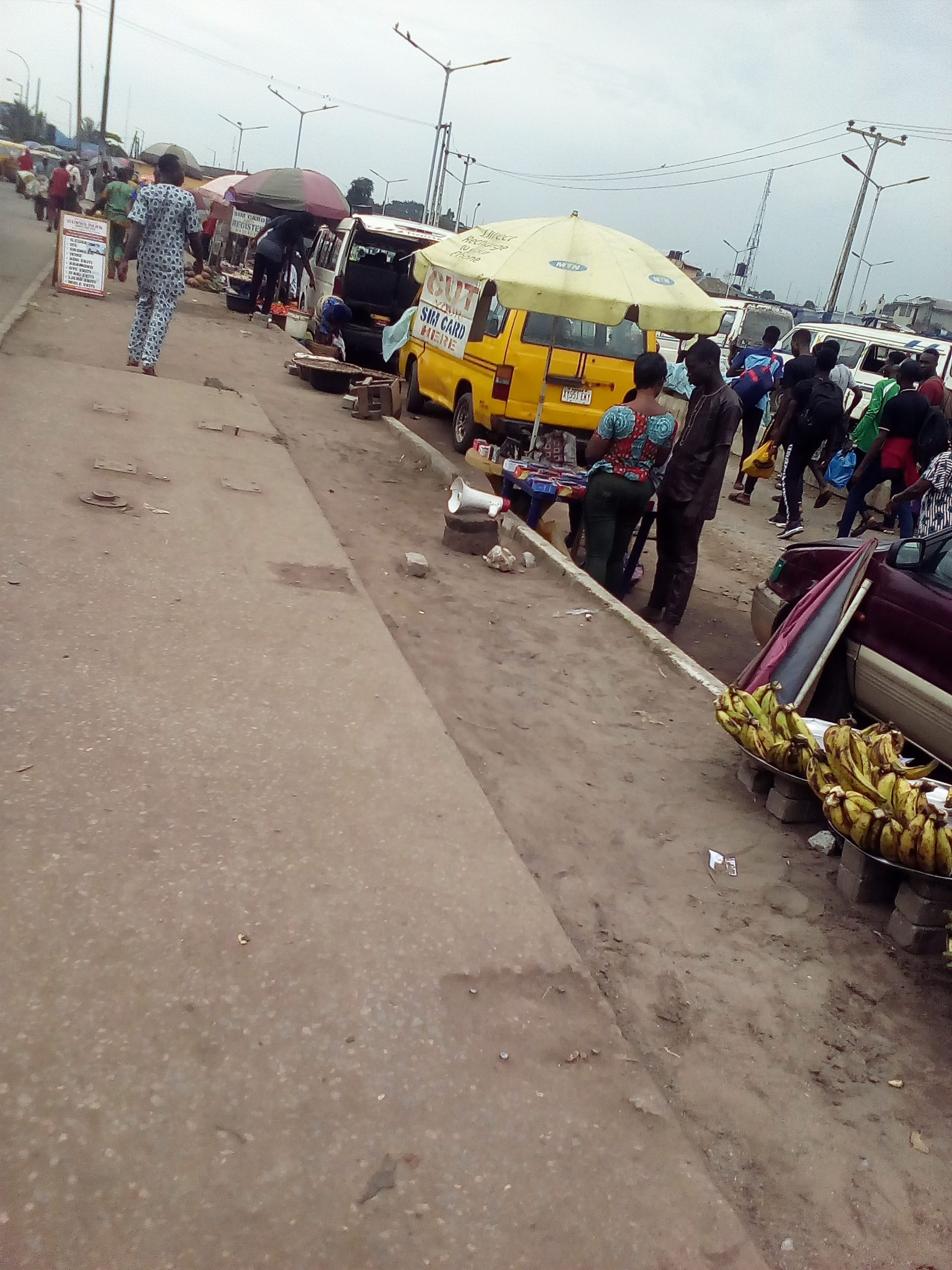
Ketu New bus park

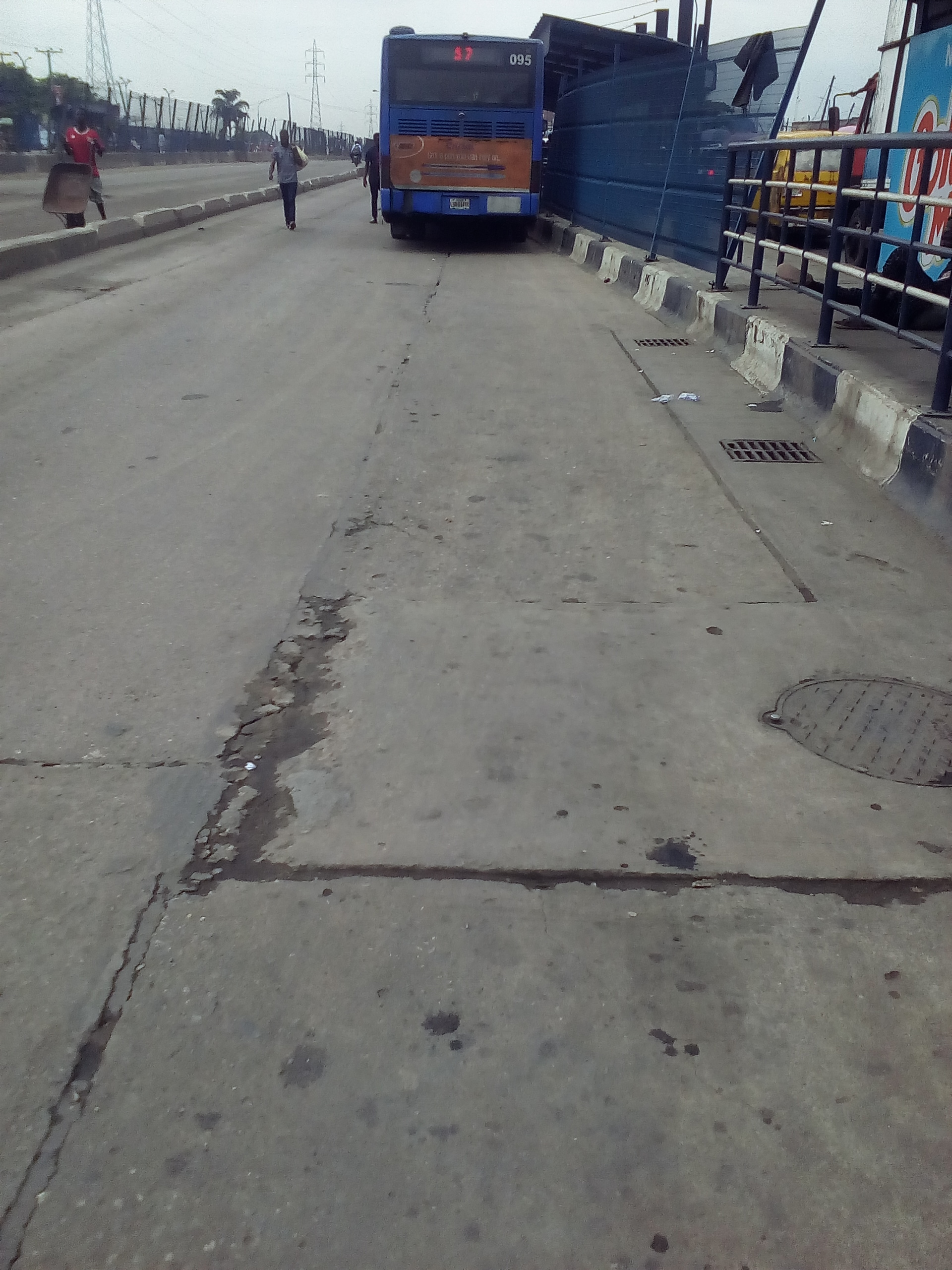
BRT Bus-stop
