= Mokwa =

Town in Niger state

- LGA and town
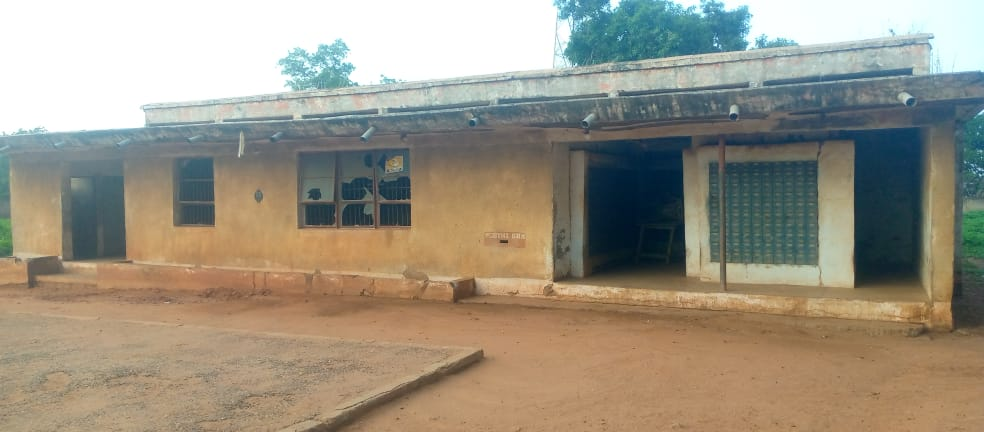
- The post office in Mokwa.
- Interactive map of Mokwa
- Location in Nigeria
- Coordinates: 9°17′37″N 5°3′24″E
- Country: Nigeria
- State: Niger State
- Council Chairman: February 11, 2016

Government
  - Local Government Chairman and the Head of the Local Government Council: Hon. Amb. Jibril Abdullahi Muregi

Area
  - Total: 4,338 km^{2} (1,675 sq mi)

Population (2006 census)
  - Total: 244,937
  - Density: 56.46/km^{2} (146.2/sq mi)
- Time zone: UTC+1 (WAT)
- 3-digit postal code prefix: 912
- ISO 3166 code: NG.NI.MO

Mokwa is a town and Local Government Area and market town in Niger State, Nigeria. The town had an estimated population of 416,600 in 2022.

The long southern border of the LGA is formed by the Niger River from Lake Jebba in the west beyond the confluence of the Kaduna River in the east. Kwara State and Kogi State are across the Niger from the LGA. Mokwa is a major meeting point where traders from the south buy food from growers in the north.

The postal code of the area is 912.

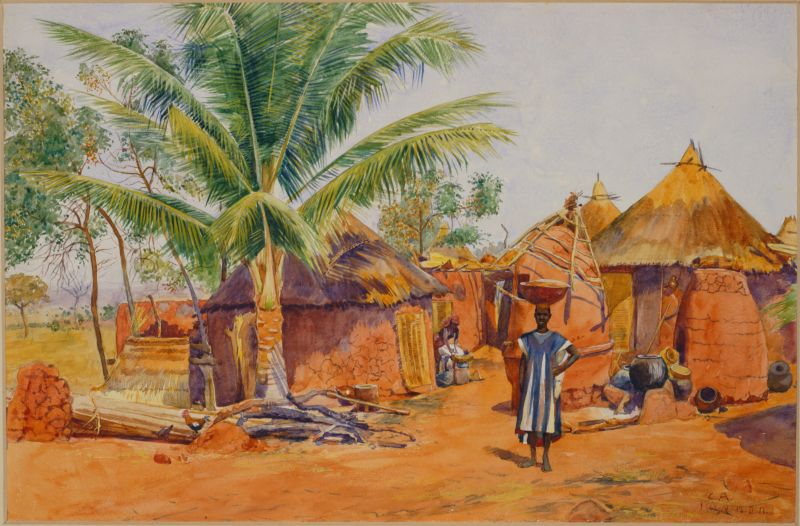
A watercolour of a compound in Mokwa, 1911

== Climate ==
The temperature in the region fluctuates year-round, ranging from 17 to 37 °C (63 to 98 °F), with occasional dips below 14 °C (57 °F) or above 39 °C (103 °F).

From February 3 to April 26, the hot season, with an average daily high temperature exceeding 35 °C (95 °F), lasts for 2.7 months. In Mokwa, April is the hottest month of the year, with an average high of 36 °C (96 °F) and low of 25 °C (77 °F).

The 3.3-month cool season, which runs from July 1 to October 11, has an average daily maximum temperature of less than 31 °C (87 °F). With an average low of 18 °C (64 °F) and high of 33 °C (92 °F), December is the coldest month of the year in Mokwa.

=== Flood ===
On May 28, 2025, the city experienced severe damage after significant flooding of the Niger River, resulting in upwards of 200 deaths, with an additional 500 people missing as of June 1.
