= Nigeria Hydrological Services Agency =

Agency overview
- Formed: 27 August 2010; 16 years ago
- Jurisdiction: Nigeria
- Headquarters: Abuja
- Agency executive: Engr, Clement Onyeaso Nze, Director General
- Key document: NIHSA Act 2010 published in the Official Gazette of the Federal Government of Nigeria No. 100, Vol.97 of 31 August 2010
- Website: https://nihsa.gov.ng/

The Nigeria Hydrological Services Agency (NIHSA) is an agency of the Federal Republic of Nigeria that was established in 2010 under the Federal Ministry of Water Resources. The agency was established through the NIHSA Act of 2010, published in the Official Gazette of the Federal Government of Nigeria No. 100, Vol.97 of 31 August 2010. The agency was established with the core mandate of maintaining hydrological stations nationwide including carrying groundwater exploration as well as assessing Nigeria's surface and groundwater resources in terms of quantity, quality, distribution and availability in time and space. The day-to-day activities of the agency is managed by the Director General of the agency, who is also a member of the Governing Board. Other members of the agency's Governing board include a part-time Chairman, a representative from the Ministry of Water Resources, and three other persons to represent public interest.

== Origins ==
The Nigeria Hydrological Services Agency (NIHSA) was formed in 2010 through the NIHSA Act of 2010 which was signed into law on 27 August 2010 by the then President of the Federal Republic of Nigeria, President Goodluck Ebele Jonathan. The agency was formed to address the changes in the erstwhile Department of Hydrology and Hydrogeology of the Federal Ministry of Water Resources. Among the duties performed by the agency is the issuance of flood alerts in Nigeria.

== Agency Structure ==
The agency is headed by a Director General who is supported by the directors of the six departments of the agency. The department include Hydrogeology, Hydro-Geophysics, Administration and Finance, Hydrogeo-informatics, operational hydrology, as well as Engineering Hydrology.
