= 2024 Lekki flood =

Natural disaster in Nigeria

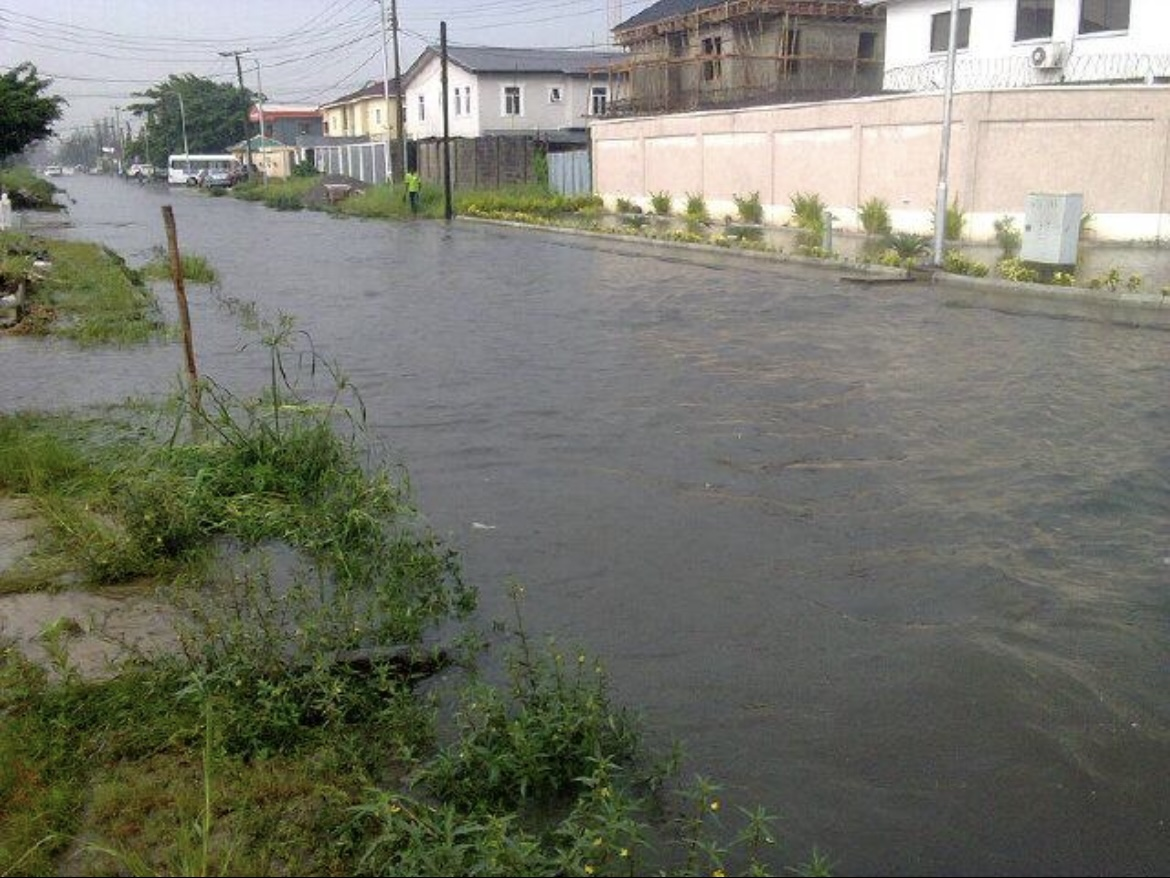
Flooding on 11 July 2024

On 4 July 2024, heavy rainfall caused flooding in Lekki, a city in Lagos State, Nigeria. The flooding caused significant damage to residential areas in Ibeju-Lekki and other affected locations. The streets were covered in water, buildings collapsed, and cars were swept away.

== Overview ==
Lekki is a city located in Lagos State, Nigeria. It is located to the south-east of Lagos city. A naturally formed peninsula, bordering its west are Victoria Island and Ikoyi districts of Lagos, with the Atlantic Ocean to its south, Lagos Lagoon to the north, and Lekki Lagoon to its east; with the city's southeast, which ends around the western edge of Refuge Island, borders the eastern part of Ibeju-Lekki LGA.

== Flood event ==
In the morning of 4 July, a heavy rainfall started which did not stop until after ten hours. The flash flood that resulted inflicted severe damage to the area. Flooding damaged many homes, businesses, roads, and landmarks.

== Aftermath ==
There was blockage of road for days as businesses and residents cleaned up from the floods and began repairing damaged buildings. Some residents had to move out of their homes to only come back after.

During the visit of the Commissioner for the Environment and Water Resources in Lagos state Tokunbo Wahab, attributed the recurring flooding to the residents' habit of building to block System 156, he emphasized that the state would not fold its hand and allow some people for profit making sake to destroy public infrastructure provided by the public and government.
