= St Anne's School, Ibadan =

Girls' school in Ibadan, Nigeria

St Anne's School, Ibadan is a secondary school for girls in Ibadan, Nigeria. The school took its current name in 1950, after a merger between Kudeti Girls School, founded in 1899, and CMS Girls School, Lagos, founded in 1869. It can therefore claim to be the oldest girls' secondary school in Nigeria.

== CMS Girls School, Lagos ==
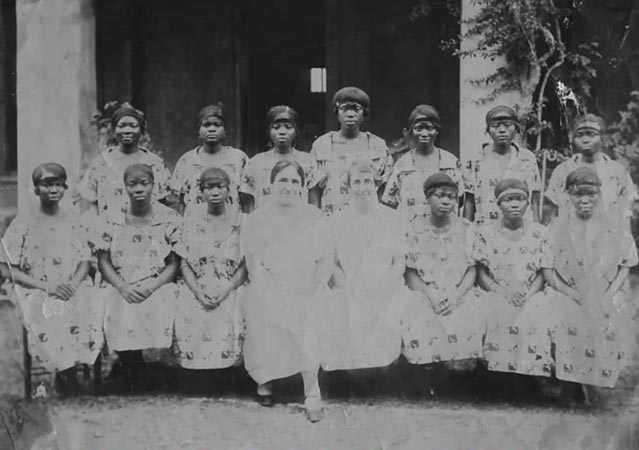
CMS girls seminary in the 1920s

The CMS Female Institution was founded on 1 May 1869, ten years after the Church Missionary Society had founded CMS Grammar School, Lagos as the first boys grammar school in Nigeria. Abigail Macaulay, wife of the boys' school headmaster, and daughter of Bishop Samuel Ajayi Crowther, had pressed for there to be a girls' institution, in order that rich people in Lagos no longer need send their girls abroad to study. The school, situated on what today is Broad Street in Lagos, initially had sixteen pupils. Mrs. Roper was its first principal. In 1891, the name was changed to CMS Girls Seminary, and in 1926 the name was again changed to CMS Girls School.

== St Anne's School, Ibadan ==
In 1950 the school was renamed, in honour of the missionary Anna Hinderer. Anna, and her husband's, tomb had been renovated by Kudeti Girls' School in 1933. The school celebrates its 'birthday' on July 26, the feast day of Saint Anne.

== Principals ==
- Mrs Annie Roper 1869
- Mrs Bonetta Forbes Davies 1870 (acting ). She was the adopted child of Queen Victoria.
- Rev Henry and Mrs Sarah Townsend were co-principals 1871–1872
- Rev and Mrs Mann 1872 - 1885
- Mrs Emma Harding née Kerr 1885 - 1886
- Mrs Vernall née Kruse 1886 - 1888
- Miss Marian Goodall 1888 - 1893
- Mrs Fanny Jones née Higgins (acting) 1894
- Miss Ballson (acting) 1894 - 1905
- Miss Boyton 1906
- Miss Hill 1906 - 1908
- Mrs Wakeman née Towe 1908
- Miss Wait 1910 - 1927
- Miss Mellor 1928 - 1931
- Miss Grimwood 1931 - 1944

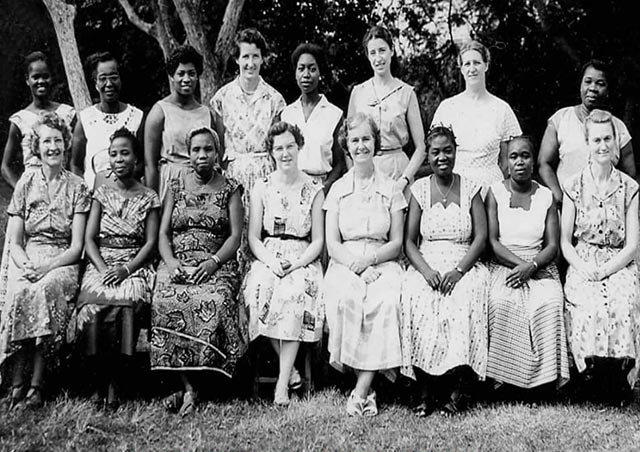
Miss Wedmore and staff in 1959

- Miss Wedmore 1944 - 1960
- Mrs Bullock née Groves 1960 - 1973
- Mrs F I Ilori (acting) 1973
- Mrs E O T Makinwane 1973 - 1984
- Mrs Nike Ladipo 1984 - 1991
- Mrs O F Osobamiro 1991 - 1994
- Mrs Dupe Babalola 1995 - 2005
- Mrs A A Kolapo 2005 - 2007
- Mrs F I Falomo 2007 - 2014
- Mrs K A Otesile 2014 - 2016
- Mrs T O Orowale 2016 - 2018
- Mrs Y O Awe 2018 - 2020

== Notable former teaching staff ==
- Rev Josiah Ransome Kuti, the grandfather of Fela Kuti, taught music 1879 - 1886
- Professor Margaret Adebisi Sowunmi, née Jadesimi, taught Biology

== Alumni ==
=== Public service ===
- Mrs Christie Ade-Ajayi née Martins (born 1930), educational specialist
- Mrs Dorothy Akanya, née Miller, first female commissioner in Nigeria.
- Omoba Tejumade Alakija, née Aderemi (1925–2013), civil servant.
- Professor Bolanle Awe, née Fajembola (born 1933), history professor.
- Mrs Ngozi Okonjo-Iweala (born 1954), director general of the World Trade Organization.
- Mrs Oladayo Oluwole née Adeleke Adedoyin, first female Nigerian Prisons Service Officer.
- Mrs Ibukunade Sijuwola, née Fagunwa, chair of the D.O. Fagunwa Foundation to protect indigenous languages.

=== Authors ===
- Flora Nwapa, née Nwakuche (1931–1993), writer.
- Mrs Mabel Segun, née Aig Imokhuede (born 1930), author.

=== Media ===
- Mrs Anike Agbaje-Williams, née Kuforiji (born 1934), newsreader.

=== Law ===
- Hon Justice Olufunlola Oyelola Adekeye, née Akinlade, Federal Supreme Court Justice
- Professor Jadesola Olayinka Akande, née Esan (1940–2008), law professor & Vice Chancellor of Lagos State University.
- Justice Dolapo Akinsanya, née Onabamiro (1941–2020), judge.
- Justice Monisola Agbeke Fafiade, née Jacobs (born 1936), jurist.
- Justice Atinuke Omobonike Ige OFR, née Oloko Judge Federal Court of Appeal (died 2003) .
- Hon Justice Roseline Ajoke Omotosho, née Sonola-Soyinka, (died 1999), Lagos State Chief Judge.
- Hon.Justice Mobolanle Abidemi Okikiolu Ighile, Lagos State High Court Judge.

=== Accountancy, insurance and economics ===
- Mrs Claire Ighodaro, CBE née Ukpoma. The First Female President of the Chartered Institute of Management Accountants
- Mrs Olutoyin Olakunri, née Adesigbin (1937–2018), accountant and businesswoman

=== Politics ===
- Abiola Babatope, née Odeyale, former Member of the House of Representatives
- Kofoworola Bucknor-Akerele, Deputy Governor of Lagos State
- Gwendoline Etonde Burnley, née Martin, Cameroonian politician
- Ebiti Ndok-Jegede, presidential candidate
- Remi Şonaiya, née Fawole, presidential candidate
- Ime Udom, barrister and politician

=== Science, medicine and dentistry ===
- Professor Ekanem Ikpi Braide (born 1946), parasitologist, President Nigeria Academy of Science.
- Lady Deborah Jibowu, MBE, OON née Fasan (1924–2019), Nigeria's first female science graduate.
- Dr Simisola Onibuwe Johnson (1929–2000), dentist
- Dr Olufunmilayo Olopade, née Falusi (born 1957), oncologist
- Professor Oyinade Olurin, née Odutola, first female professor of medicine in Nigeria.
- Mrs Modupe Olabisi Oluwole, née Ogundipe (1933–2020), pharmacist.
- Dr Marianne Abimbola Silva, née Phillips (1926–2015), medical doctor.
- Professor Emeritus Margaret Adebisi Sowunmi, née Jadesimi (born 1939), botanist and environmental archaeologist.
- Professor Kudirat Olanike Adeyemo, Veterinary Surgeon

=== Armed forces ===
- Major General Aderonkę Kale, army psychiatrist.

=== Educators ===
- Mrs Eva Adebayo Adelaja, née Adebonojo founder of Eva Adelaja Girls Grammar School Bariga.
- Mrs Leila Fowler, née Moore founder of Vivian Fowler Memorial School for Girls
- Mrs Tanimowo Ogunlesi, née Okusanya (1908–2002), women's rights activist and founder of Children's Home School, Ibadan
- Mrs Yetunde Omisade, née Esan, first principal of the Peoples Girls Grammar School.
- Chief Mrs Gladys Aduke Vaughan, née Akinloye (1920–2014), founder of Omolewa School.

=== Nursing ===
- Mrs Kofoworola Abeni Pratt, née Scott (1915–1992), nurse

=== The Arts ===
- Mrs Toyin Abraham, née Aimakhu (born 1990), actress and blogger
- Ms Ayo Adesanya, Nollywood Actress in Yoruba and English languages
- Mrs Teni Aofiyebi, née Gbogboade, actress and businessperson

=== Women's affairs ===
- Lady Oyinkansola Abayomi, née Ajasa (1897–1990), Nationalist, Feminist, President of the Nigeria Girl Guide Association
- Mrs Hilda Adefarasin, née Petgrave (born 1925), women's rights activist
- Lady Kofo Ademola, MBE. MFR. OFR.née Moore (1913–2002), First Black African Female University Graduate . Educationist, Founder of Primary & Secondary Schools for Girls, Writer.

=== Historians and scholars ===
- Clara Olanrewaju Osinulu, née Odugbesan (born 1934). Anthropologist and first female curator of National Museum of Nigeria.

=== Business ===
- Mrs Emily Aig-Imoukhuede, née Meffullhoude (born 1941), business executive.
- Mrs Kehinde Kamson, née Adelaja (born 1961), Entrepreneur
