= Listed buildings in Hempnall =

Non-Civil Parish in Norfolk, England

Hempnall is a village and civil parish in the South Norfolk district of Norfolk, England. It contains 51 listed buildings that are recorded in the National Heritage List for England. Of these one is grade I and 50 are grade II.

This list is based on the information retrieved online from Historic England.

== Key ==
Grade	Criteria
I	Buildings that are of exceptional interest
II*	Particularly important buildings of more than special interest
II	Buildings that are of special interest

== Listing ==
Name	Grade	Location	Type	Completed (Note: The date given is the date used by Historic England as significant for the initial building or that of an important part in the structure's description.)	Date designated	Grid ref. (Note: The grid reference is based on the British national grid reference system, sometimes known as OSGB36, used by the Ordnance Survey.) Geo-coordinates	Notes	Entry number (Note: The "List Entry Number" is a unique number assigned to each listed building and scheduled monument by Historic England.)	Image	Wikidata
Park Farmhouse	II	Barondole Lane			26 June 1981	TM2546591297; 52°28′23″N 1°19′06″E		1373236	Upload Photo	Q26654234
House Occupied by Miss Tye	II	Bungay Road			26 June 1981	TM2443094361; 52°30′03″N 1°18′19″E		1050327	Upload Photo	Q26302315
Thackery House	II	Bungay Road			26 June 1981	TM2412794318; 52°30′02″N 1°18′02″E		1304406	Upload Photo	Q26591389
The Willows	II	Bungay Road			26 June 1981	TM2420994247; 52°30′00″N 1°18′07″E		1153209	Upload Photo	Q26445964
Willow House	II	Bungay Road			26 June 1981	TM2428394301; 52°30′02″N 1°18′11″E		1373235	Upload Photo	Q26654233
Church of St Margaret	I	Church Plain	church building		7 December 1959	TM2412194454; 52°30′07″N 1°18′02″E		1050328	Church of St Margaret More images	Q17537464
Lord Nelson Public House	II	Church Plain			26 June 1981	TM2407494431; 52°30′06″N 1°18′00″E		1050329	Upload Photo	Q26302316
Fairstead Lane Farmhouse	II	Fairstead Lane			26 June 1981	TM2351795055; 52°30′27″N 1°17′32″E		1304377	Upload Photo	Q26591361
Grove Farmhouse	II	Fairstead Lane			26 June 1981	TM2257195546; 52°30′44″N 1°16′43″E		1050330	Upload Photo	Q26302317
Krons Manor	II	Fairstead Lane			11 September 1951	TM2357794777; 52°30′18″N 1°17′34″E		1373237	Upload Photo	Q26654235
Limetree Farmhouse	II	Fairstead Lane			26 June 1981	TM2138395194; 52°30′35″N 1°15′39″E		1304378	Upload Photo	Q26591362
The Thatched House	II	Fairstead Lane			7 December 1959	TM2363894757; 52°30′17″N 1°17′38″E		1153251	Upload Photo	Q26446004
Wood Farmhouse	II	Fairstead Lane			26 June 1981	TM2229495403; 52°30′40″N 1°16′28″E		1373238	Upload Photo	Q26654236
Bush Farmhouse	II	Field Lane			26 June 1981	TM2371993323; 52°29′31″N 1°17′38″E		1050331	Upload Photo	Q26302318
Poacher's Cottage	II	Furze Road			26 June 1981	TM2503893749; 52°29′43″N 1°18′49″E		1153291	Upload Photo	Q26446041
The Firs	II	Furze Road			26 June 1981	TM2510593639; 52°29′39″N 1°18′52″E		1373239	Upload Photo	Q26654237
The Haven	II	Furze Road			26 June 1981	TM2518593476; 52°29′34″N 1°18′56″E		1304384	Upload Photo	Q26591368
Home Farmhouse	II	Hempnall Green			26 June 1981	TM2479293165; 52°29′24″N 1°18′35″E		1050333	Upload Photo	Q26302320
Sycamore Farmhouse	II	Hempnall Green			26 June 1981	TM2490093126; 52°29′23″N 1°18′40″E		1153302	Upload Photo	Q26446053
The Grange	II	Hempnall Green			26 June 1981	TM2472493085; 52°29′22″N 1°18′31″E		1373240	Upload Photo	Q26654238
Villa Farmhouse	II	Hempnall Green			26 June 1981	TM2489193641; 52°29′39″N 1°18′41″E		1050332	Upload Photo	Q26302319
Barn and Stable Range Adjoining Three Feathers to the South-west	II	Lundy Green			26 June 1981	TM2452892460; 52°29′02″N 1°18′19″E		1050334	Upload Photo	Q26302321
Chestnuts Farmhouse	II	Lundy Green			26 June 1981	TM2445692484; 52°29′03″N 1°18′15″E		1373241	Upload Photo	Q26654239
Grange Farmhouse	II	Lundy Green			26 June 1981	TM2377792192; 52°28′54″N 1°17′39″E		1050335	Upload Photo	Q26302322
Hempnall House	II	Lundy Green			24 July 1992	TM2426392514; 52°29′04″N 1°18′05″E		1262145	Upload Photo	Q26553040
Rose Cottage	II	Lundy Green			26 June 1981	TM2451292460; 52°29′02″N 1°18′18″E		1304365	Upload Photo	Q26591350
Three Feathers	II	Lundy Green			26 June 1981	TM2453292471; 52°29′02″N 1°18′19″E		1153315	Upload Photo	Q26446066
Townhouse Farmhouse	II	Lundy Green			26 June 1981	TM2448292427; 52°29′01″N 1°18′17″E		1153325	Upload Photo	Q26446075
Cottleston	II	Mill Road			26 June 1981	TM2388194302; 52°30′02″N 1°17′49″E		1050337	Upload Photo	Q26302323
Disused Windmill (now Part of Hempnall Mill Centre)	II	Mill Road			26 June 1981	TM2375594239; 52°30′00″N 1°17′42″E		1050338	Upload Photo	Q26302324
The Chequers	II	Mill Road			26 June 1981	TM2403194336; 52°30′03″N 1°17′57″E		1153332	Upload Photo	Q26446082
The Poplars	II	Mill Road			26 June 1981	TM2408994324; 52°30′03″N 1°18′00″E		1153328	Upload Photo	Q26446078
Hempnall War Memorial	II	Norwich, NR15 2NF	war memorial		15 March 2017	TM2367794768; 52°30′18″N 1°17′40″E		1443914	Hempnall War Memorial More images	Q66478590
Moat Farmhouse	II	Road Green			26 June 1981	TM2593493994; 52°29′49″N 1°19′37″E		1050297	Upload Photo	Q26302287
Road Green Farmhouse	II	Road Green			26 June 1981	TM2600693930; 52°29′47″N 1°19′41″E		1050296	Upload Photo	Q26302286
Chestnut Farmhouse	II	Silver Green			26 June 1981	TM2555993231; 52°29′25″N 1°19′16″E		1050299	Upload Photo	Q26302289
Meadow Farmhouse	II	Silver Green			26 June 1981	TM2523992804; 52°29′12″N 1°18′58″E		1050298	Upload Photo	Q26302288
Silver Green Farmhouse	II	Silver Green			26 June 1981	TM2560093366; 52°29′29″N 1°19′18″E		1373260	Upload Photo	Q26654258
Yew Tree Farmhouse	II	Silver Green			26 June 1981	TM2551493114; 52°29′21″N 1°19′13″E		1373259	Upload Photo	Q26654257
Kirkstone, the Long House and Post Office	II	The Long House And Post Office, Church Plain			26 June 1981	TM2411294420; 52°30′06″N 1°18′02″E		1304369	Upload Photo	Q26591353
Manor Cottages	II	1, 2, 3 and 4, The Street			26 June 1981	TM2393194516; 52°30′09″N 1°17′52″E		1050302	Upload Photo	Q26302292
Connaught House	II	The Street			26 June 1981	TM2398594482; 52°30′08″N 1°17′55″E		1050301	Upload Photo	Q26302291
Forge Cottage	II	The Street			26 June 1981	TM2394794510; 52°30′09″N 1°17′53″E		1373261	Upload Photo	Q26654259
Lime Tree Cottage	II	The Street			26 June 1981	TM2387594553; 52°30′10″N 1°17′50″E		1153509	Upload Photo	Q26446245
Manor Farm Cottage	II	The Street			26 June 1981	TM2400694500; 52°30′08″N 1°17′56″E		1153517	Upload Photo	Q26446252
Manor Farmhouse	II	The Street			26 June 1981	TM2401494518; 52°30′09″N 1°17′57″E		1050304	Upload Photo	Q26302294
Parsonage	II	The Street			26 June 1981	TM2406294492; 52°30′08″N 1°17′59″E		1373263	Upload Photo	Q26654261
Pevensey House	II	The Street			26 June 1981	TM2384894578; 52°30′11″N 1°17′48″E		1373262	Upload Photo	Q26654260
Smithy Cottage and Priory Cottage	II	The Street			26 June 1981	TM2405394461; 52°30′07″N 1°17′59″E		1050300	Upload Photo	Q26302290
Stables North of Parsonage	II	The Street			26 June 1981	TM2405294534; 52°30′10″N 1°17′59″E		1304259	Upload Photo	Q26591258
The Hollies	II	The Street			26 June 1981	TM2378494635; 52°30′13″N 1°17′45″E		1050303	Upload Photo	Q26302293

== See also ==
- Grade I listed buildings in Norfolk
- Grade II* listed buildings in Norfolk

== Sources ==
- Wilson, Bill; Pevsner, Nikolaus (1999) [1962], Norfolk 2: North-West and South, The Buildings of England, New Haven and London: Yale University Press, ISBN 978-0-300-09657-6
