= Ajoke =

- Gender: Female
- Language: Yoruba

Origin
- Origin: Nigeria
- Region of origin: Southwestern Nigeria

pronunciation

Ajoke is a feminine given name. Which means (Jointly cherished).

== Notable people with the name include ==
- Dorcas Ajoke Adesokan (born 1998), Nigerian badminton player
- Ajoke Muhammed (born 1941), First Lady of Nigerian from 1975 to 1976
- Muizat Ajoke Odumosu (born 1987), Nigerian athlete
- Rosaline Ajoke Omotosho (died 1999), Nigerian judge
