= Sowunmi (name) =

Sowunmi is a surname. It may refer to:

- Margaret Adebisi Sowunmi (born 1939), Nigerian botanist and environmental archaeologist
- Omar Sowunmi (born 1995), English football player
- Thomas Sowunmi (born 1978), Nigerian-born retired Hungarian international football player
