= Omolola Irinoye =

Nigerian Academic

Vice-Chancellor of Achievers University
- Incumbent
- Assumed office 2023
- Preceded by: Samuel Aje

Personal details
- Born: Omolola Irinoye
- Education: University of Ibadan, Obafemi Awolowo University, University of York
- Profession: Academic

Omolola Irinoye is a professor and the first female Vice-Chancellor of Achievers University. She was appointed at a council meeting following the death of her predecessor, Samuel Aje.

== Career ==
Irinoye is a professor of Community Health Nursing before her appointment as the Vice-Chancellor in the acting capacity.
