= Samuel Aje =

Nigerian Academic

Vice-Chancellor of Achievers University
- In office 2020–2023
- Succeeded by: Omolola Irinoye

Personal details
- Born: Samuel Aje
- Profession: Academic

Samuel Aje was a Nigerian professor and the Vice-Chancellor of Achievers University. He died in 2023 at the age of 72 years.

== Career ==
Aje was a professor and was appointed Vice-Chancellor of Achievers University located in Owo, Ondo State, in June 2020.

== Death ==
He died in December 2023 with the cause of his death unknown to the public.
