= Ogunlesi =

Ogunlesi is a surname. Notable people with the surname include:

- Adebayo Ogunlesi (born 1953), Nigerian lawyer and investment banker
- Mowalola Ogunlesi (born 1955), Nigerian-born fashion designer
- Tanimowo Ogunlesi (1908–2002), Nigerian women's rights activist
- Tolu Ogunlesi (born 1982), Nigerian journalist, poet, photographer, and writer
