= Kamson =

Kamson is a surname. Notable people with the surname include:

- Kehinde Kamson (born 1961), Nigerian entrepreneur, business leader, and philanthropist
- Meijinlung Kamson (born 1939), Indian politician
- MJ Kamson-Kamara (born 2006), Sierra Leonean footballer
