= Abiola Babatope =

Nigerian politician

Member, House of Representatives from Lagos State
- Constituency: Mushin Central District II

Personal details
- Spouse: Ebenezer Babatope
- Education: University of Ibadan
- Occupation: Politician

Abiola Babatope, née Odeyale, is a Nigerian politician who represented Mushin Central District II, Lagos in the House of Representatives during the second republic.

Babatope attended St Anne's School Ibadan for her secondary school education and later studied geology at University of Ibadan. After graduating, she worked at the office of the Secretary to the Lagos State government. After leaving the services of Lagos State, she joined Mobil Producing Nigeria in 1971. In 1977, she was a Councillor in Mushin and in 1979, she was elected a House of Representative member under Unity Party of Nigeria (UPN).

She is married to Ebenezer Babatope, also a politician.
