= Leila Fowler =

Nigerian educationalist (1933–2025)

- Born: Leila Euphemia Apinke Moore; 23 March 1933; Lagos, Colony and Protectorate of Nigeria
- Died: September 2025 (aged 92)
- Occupations: Nurse, lawyer, educationist
- Children: 3

Chief Leila Euphemia Apinke Fowler, MFR (23 March 1933 – September 2025) was a Nigerian educationalist who founded a school. She was awarded the Nigerian chieftaincy of Yeye Mofin of Lagos by Adeyinka Oyekan, that kingdom's monarch.

== Life and career ==
Fowler was born in Lagos, Nigeria, on 23 March 1933. Her father was Peter Moore. She attended the CMS Girls School, Lagos, but qualified with a Cambridge Certificate at the Queen of Rosary College, Onitsha, in 1951. She initially worked as a teacher and started to train as a nurse in London. She left and met her future husband, who was a consultant in Lagos. They married in 1953 and had three children.

Fowler trained to be a lawyer at the Middle Temple and studied at the University of London. She was called to the UK Bar in 1962 and the Supreme Court of Nigeria in 1963. She worked for two groups of Lagos lawyers before launching her own company, where she specialised in insurance law.

Fowler founded the Vivian Fowler Memorial College for Girls in January 1991. The school was named after her daughter who had died.

Her husband, Vidal Fowler, died in 2015. On 8 September 2025, it was announced that Fowler had died at the age of 92.
