= Anna Hinderer =

British missionary to Ibadan in Nigeria

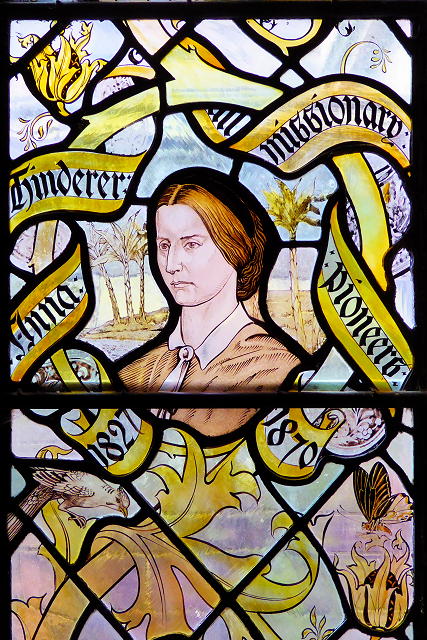
- Hinderer window in Liverpool Cathedral
- Born: Anna Martin; 19 March 1827; Hempnall, Norfolk, UKGBI
- Died: 6 June 1870 (aged 43); Martham, Norfolk, UKGBI
- Occupation: missionary
- Employer: Church Missionary Society
- Known for: establishing a mission in Ibadan
- Spouse: David Hinderer

Anna Hinderer (née Martin; 19 March 1827 – 6 June 1870) was a British missionary to Ibadan, Yoruba Country which is now part of Nigeria. She is celebrated by a stained-glass window in Liverpool Cathedral.

== Life ==
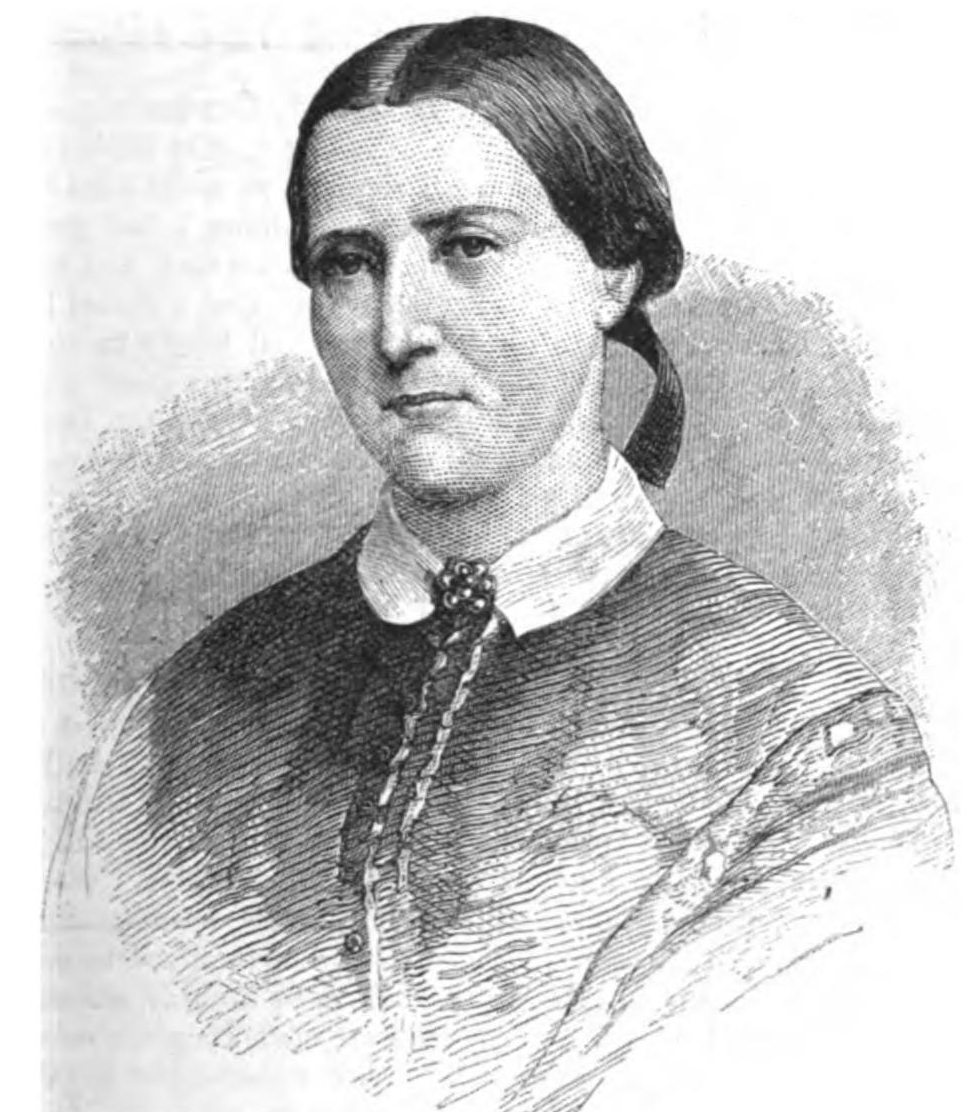

Hinderer was born Anna Martin on 19 March 1827 in the village of Hempnall, Norfolk to William Martin, a merchant, and Margaret Martin (née Woodroffe).

Following the death of her mother in 1832, Hinderer was brought up by her aunt and grandfather. At the age of twelve Hinderer went to live in Lowestoft, she worked there as secretary to the Reverend Francis and Richenda Cunningham at Lowestoft's vicarage. Whilst serving as a Sunday School teacher she reported her own conversion. She had an ambition to be a missionary and on 14 October 1852 she married David Hinderer. Her new husband came from Germany but he was employed as an African missionary by the British Church Missionary Society.

In 1852 they set out to establish a new mission in Yoruba Country in what is now known as part of Nigeria. Anna briefly stayed at Abeokuta. In 1853 she arrived in Ibadan and although they had intended to travel further they decided to set up their mission in that settlement. Ibadan's population was around 55,000 according to David. Anna would teach in the school that they built and she would run the mission when David was away preaching or trying to translate the New Testament. Her husband could speak Yoruba and he was on good terms with the local dignitaries. This advantage meant that the children of local chiefs attended and sometimes boarded at the school which Anna ran. The first two Christian converts were Yejide and Akielle who were the son and daughter of a local chief. Lady Hannah Buxton sent boxes of toys to Hinderer in 1855. By 1866 her grandchildren were parcelling up toys to send to Nigeria.

In 1860 war broke out and the hostilities prevented them from being able to travel to the coast for five years. Parcels from Lady Buxton could not be sent as they would be ambushed. Money and food ran out and Hinderer had to return children in her own care wherever possible. Sadly one of their converts died after being mistreated by their family for being Christian. This was the start of her poor health and she returned to England in 1869.

== Death and legacy ==
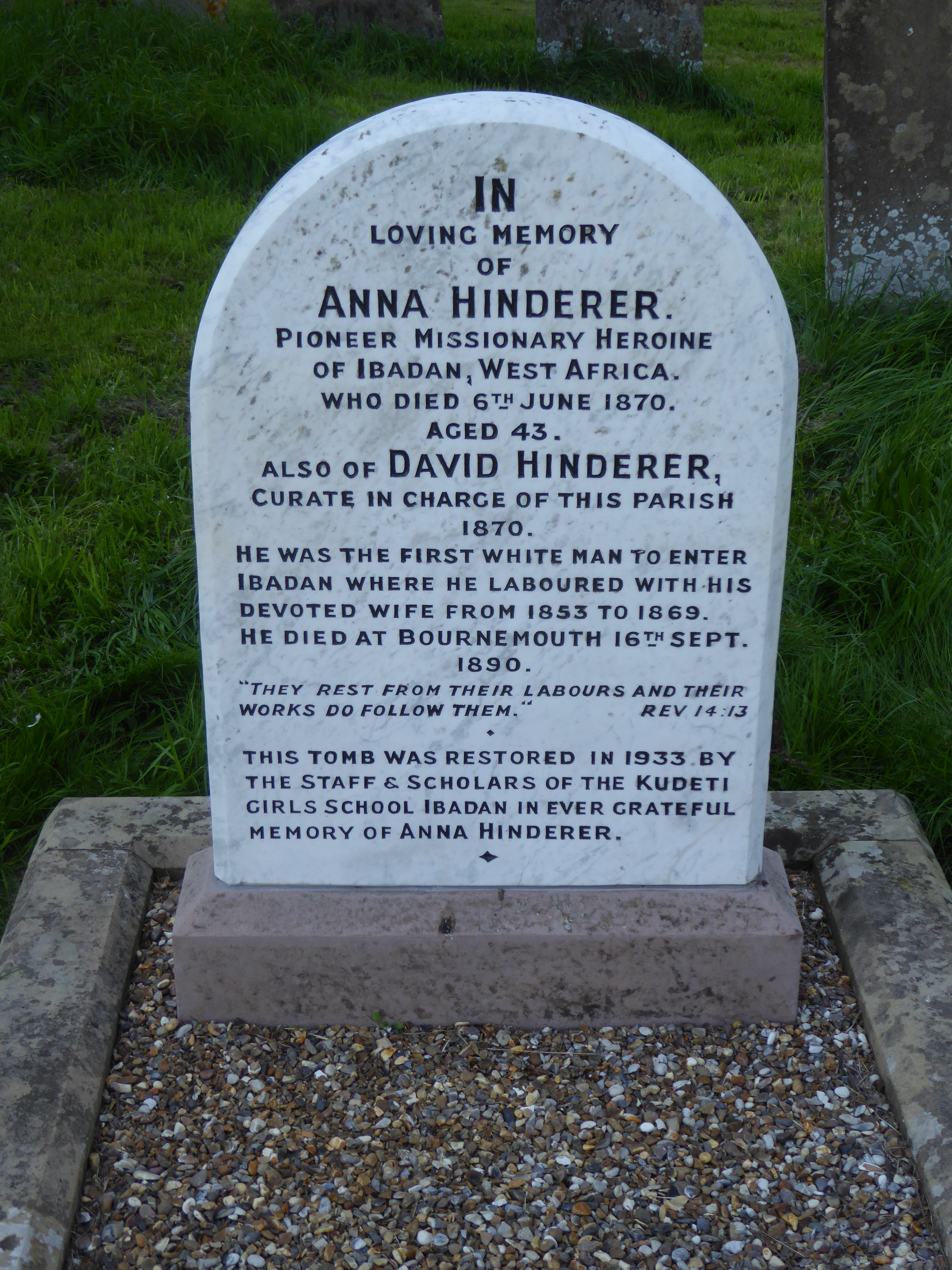
Two Victorian missionaries

Hinderer died in Martham in Norfolk in 1870 where her husband was acting as curate. Two years later her memoirs were published. Seventeen Years in the Yoruba Country and although her husband was shown as joint author the book had been compiled by two sisters, named Hone, who lived in Halesowen Rectory. The book raised £31 and this was sent to Daniel and Sussanah Olubi who had taken over the mission in Ibadan. Daniel and Sussanah had married whilst working and deputising for the Hinderers.

Hinderer has a small stained glass window devoted to her in the Lady Chapel of Liverpool Cathedral. In 1933, Kudeti Girls' School in Ibadan restored a memorial in thanks for the life of Anna (and David) Hinderer. That school would eventually become part of a school that changed its name to St Anne's School in honour of Hinderer in 1950. The school celebrates its 'birthday' on 26 July, the feast day of Saint Anne.
