= Olufunlola Adekeye =

Nigerian judge

Justice Olufunlola Oyelola Adekeye is a Nigerian judge. She was the second woman to be appointed an Associate Justice of the Supreme Court of Nigeria (JSC).

== Life ==
Adekeye attended St Anne's School Ibadan for her secondary school education. She served on the Court of Appeal before appointment to the Supreme Court. Her Supreme Court appointment, along with that of John Fabiyi, was confirmed by President Umaru Musa Yar'Adua on 6 March 2009.

In 2012 Justice Adekeye declared that "writing judgments is not for lazy jurists." She retired from the Supreme Court bench in November 2012. In a speech she made at her valedictory court session, she called for review of policies blocking married women from reaching the peak of their career in their husband's state of origin:

Complaints of this nature are now rampant. Most women transfer their services to the state of origin of their husbands immediately after their marriage. This is logical and in compliance with the tenets of marriage that the two spouses shall become one. In some native customs, particularly among the Yoruba, the wife no longer has a place in her ancestral home after marriage. Whenever there is vacancy at the top in the husband’s state of origin, she will be denied the post and there and then returned to her own state of origin, after climbing the ladder and putting so many years into the service.
