= Anike Agbaje-Williams =

Nigerian newsreader (1936–2025)

- Born: Anike Kuforiji; 23 October 1936; Abeokuta, Colony and Protectorate of Nigeria
- Died: 26 February 2025 (aged 88); Ibadan, Oyo State, Nigeria
- Occupation: Newsreader
- Years active: 1955–1986

Anike Agbaje-Williams (née Kuforiji; 23 October 1936 – 26 February 2025) was a Nigerian newsreader who was the first female television staff announcer and broadcaster in Nigeria.

== Life and career ==
Anike Kuforiji was born in Abeokuta on 23 October 1936. Her father was of Egba heritage. She spent her primary school and junior secondary school years in Lagos under the care of her guardian, Mrs Gbemisola Rosiji, wife of Ayo Rosiji, and Bishop and Mrs S. C. Philips. She attended CMS Girls School, Lagos. In 1950, when CMS Girls School was relocated to Ibadan and renamed St Anne's School, she moved with the school and finished her education in Ibadan.

After completing secondary school education, she was hired by the Nigerian Broadcasting Corporation at Ikoyi, Lagos, in 1955. One day, a colleague who usually did announcements or read small bits of information on the radio did not show up, and the current host then asked her to take his place. When the supervisor heard Agbaje-Williams's voice, he was impressed, and then asked her to join the programmes department as a staff announcer.

When a television station was established at Ibadan, she was asked to interview and was subsequently given a job at the station. Agbaje-Williams was a pioneer staff of WNTV, which was the first television station in Nigeria. She was the first person to appear on television broadcast in the country, and was the first female broadcaster of the station. She rose to become a producer and director of programmes at the television station before retiring in 1986.

== Death ==
Agbaje-Williams died in Ibadan on 26 February 2025, at the age of 88.

== Awards and recognition ==
- Lifetime Achievement Award, Nigerian Broadcasters Awards (2011)
- Rockcity Golden Voice Award (2014)
- 2017 Heroes Award, Ibadan Mesiogo Golf Open Awards
