= Gwendoline Etonde Burnley =

Cameroonian politician and development consultant (1932–2020)

Personal details
- Born: Gwendoline Etonde Martin; 1932-02-29 Buea, British Cameroon
- Died: 2020-03-07 Cameroon
- Spouse: R. E. G. Burnley
- Parents: Ernest Kofele Martin (father); Hannah Nene Enanga Martin (née Steane) (mother)
- Occupation: Politician, development consultant
- Known for: First woman from west of the Mungo to serve in Cameroon's National Assembly

Gwendoline Etonde Burnley

Gwendoline Etonde Burnley (née Martin; February 29, 1932 – March 7, 2020) was a Cameroonian politician and development consultant. She was the first woman from west of the Mungo River to become a Member of Parliament in the Cameroon National Assembly, serving from 1969 to 1988.

== Early life and education ==
Gwendoline Burnley was born in Buea, British Cameroon, on February 29, 1932, to Ernest Kofele Martin and Hannah Nene Enanga Martin (née Steane). She began her education at the Basel Mission School in Buea and later attended the CMS Girls' School, Lagos in Nigeria. After completing her university education, she earned a postgraduate diploma in Social Welfare from an institute in The Hague, Netherlands.

== Political career ==
Burnley began her career as a teacher in Kumba. In an unexpected turn, she was nominated to serve as the women's representative in the West Cameroon House of Assembly. She later recounted:

I was teaching, then, in Kumba, I think. And I was not even among the women in the party who were helping to see that people were fed and all the things which had to be done were done. I just heard my name that I had been selected to represent the women. I think that, after they had gone through the elections process and found out that there were no women among themselves, they decided to put in a woman. And that’s how I entered politics.

— Gwendoline Burnley, Mbom (2012)

After one term, the West Cameroon House of Assembly was dissolved. Burnley returned to her role in the Ministry where she had been working. In 1969, she was drafted into the newly formed Cameroon National Assembly as the only woman member. She served four consecutive terms until 1988. By the time she left office, the number of women parliamentarians had grown to 17.

In a 2012 interview, she criticized the stagnation in progress toward gender equality in Cameroonian politics, stating that more women should be encouraged and supported to take leadership roles in national governance.

== Personal life ==
In 1960, Gwendoline married R. E. G. Burnley. Outside of politics, she worked as a development consultant and advocate for women's advancement.

== Death ==
Gwendoline Etonde Burnley died on March 7, 2020.
