= Oyinade Olurin =

Nigerian Professor Of Medicine

Oyinade Odutola-Olurin
- Born: 2 February 1934 (age 92); Ijebu Ode, Ogun State
- Citizenship: Nigeria
- Occupation: Ophthalmologist
- Known for: First female black African Professor of Ophthalmology, First Nigerian female Professor of Medicine

Academic background
- Education: University of Bristol

Academic work
- Discipline: Medicine
- Sub-discipline: Ophthalmologist
- Institutions: University College Hospital (UCH), Ibadan, State Hospital in Akure

Oyinade Odutola Olurin (born 2 February 1934) is a Nigerian ophthalmologist and academic who is the first female professor of medicine in Nigeria and the first Black African professor of ophthalmology. She is a fellow of the Royal College of Ophthalmologists and the Royal College of Surgeons.

== Early life and education ==
Oyinade Olurin was born on 2 February 1934 in Ijebu Ode, Nigeria, as the sixth child of Mr and Mrs Timothy Adeola Odutola. She obtained her secondary school certificate from C.M.S. Girls' School, Lagos and her A levels from Westonbirt School in England. In 1959 and 1975, she obtained her first and second degrees in medicine from the University of Bristol.

== Career ==
Olurin began her career in 1959 at University College Hospital, Ibadan, until 1961, when she left for State Hospital, Akure, after her marriage and later travelled to Cardiff Royal Infirmary in 1962. She returned to Nigeria in 1965 as a registrar of ophthalmology at University College Hospital.

== Selected publications ==
- Olurin, E. O.; Olurin, O. (1969-11-29). "Pancreatic calcification: A report of 45 cases" (PDF). BMJ. 4 (5682). BMJ: 534–539. doi:10.1136/bmj.4.5682.534. ISSN 0959-8138.
