= Rosaline Omotosho =

Nigerian judge (died 1999)

- Died: 1 July 1999
- Education: CMS Girls School Lagos
- Occupation: Judge

Roseline or Rosaline Ajoke Omotoso, née Shonola - Shoyinka (February 27, 1931 — July 1, 1999) was a Nigerian judge. From 12 April 1995 to 27 February 1996, she was Chief Judge of Lagos State. She was the first female Chief Judge in Nigeria, and indeed in West Africa.

== Life ==
Rosaline Omotoso's maiden name was Sonola-Soyinka. She attended CMS Girls School Lagos, which later relocated to Ibadan and merged with Kudeti Girls School to be renamed St Anne's School Ibadan. She worked as a clerk in the Health Department, Lagos between 1949 and 1953. She studied for the Bar at Gray's Inn from 1957 to 1959. She was called to the English Bar on 7 February 1961 and enrolled at the Supreme Court of Nigeria on 15 June 1961.

Omotosho worked for a few months at Burke and Impey before starting in September 1961 as a Pupil Crown Counsel in the Federal Ministry of Justice. She became State Counsel in June 1963, Senior legal Assistant in May 1965, and State Counsel Grade 1 in September 1966. In July 1968 she was appointed acting Deputy Administrator-General, and in October 1968 was appointed acting Registrar of commercial Legislation. She was appointed Director of Commercial Law on 1 April 1976.

She joined the High Court of Lagos State on 6 March 1978. She succeeded Justice Ayorinde as Chief Judge of Lagos State, taking office on 12 April 1995. On 27 February 1997, she stepped down, and was succeeded by Justice Olusola Thomas.

She died on 1 July 1999. At a service held in her honor, Justice Christopher Olatunde Segun appealed for divine intervention to stop the rate of deaths affecting the state judiciary. In 2015 she was memorialized by a new courthouse in Ikeja named after her.
