= Hempnall =

Village in Norfolk, England

Coordinates: 52.500°N 1.293°E

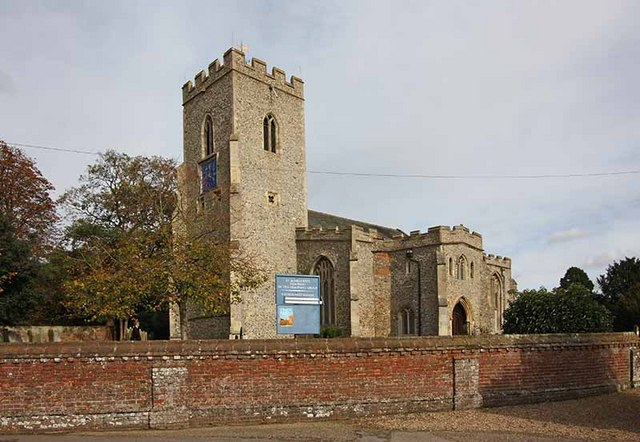
- St Margaret's Church

- Location within Norfolk
- Area: 5.72 sq mi (14.8 km^{2})
- Population: 1,238 (2021 census)
  - Density: 216/sq mi (83/km^{2})
- OS grid reference: TM236942
- Civil parish: Hempnall
- District: South Norfolk
- Shire county: Norfolk
- Region: East
- Country: England
- Sovereign state: United Kingdom
- Post town: NORWICH
- Postcode district: NR15
- Dialling code: 01508
- Police: Norfolk
- Fire: Norfolk
- Ambulance: East of England
- UK Parliament: South Norfolk

Hempnall is a village and civil parish in the English county of Norfolk.

Hempnall is located 6.8 miles (10.9 km) north of Harleston and 8.4 miles (13.5 km) south of Norwich.

== History ==
Hempnall's name is of Anglo-Saxon origin and derives from the Old English for Hemma's nook of land.

In the Domesday Book, Hempnall is listed as a settlement of 57 households in the hundred of Depwade. In 1086, the village was divided between the estates of Roger Bigod and Ralph Baynard.

According to John Wesley's journal, on 4 September 1759 he walked the nine miles from Norwich to preach in Hempnall market place. He described how he was followed by a mob from Norwich, who may have been financed by the city's brewers, and the mob's ringleader tried to disrupt the proceedings with a horn. This was quickly thrown away by one of the crowd, and the others were soon deeply attentive to John Wesley's message: "By grace ye are saved through faith".

During the Eighteenth Century, a workhouse was built in Hempnall but no longers stands.

During the Second World War, a decoy airfield was built in Hempnall to distract the attentions of the Luftwaffe away from RAF Hardwick.

There have been reported sightings of Black Shuck in Hempnall.

== Geography ==
According to the 2021 census, Hempnall has a total population of 1,238 people which demonstrates a decrease from the 1,292 people listed in the 2011 census.

== St. Margaret's Church ==
Hempnall's parish church is dedicated to Saint Margaret the Virgin and dates from the Thirteenth Century. St. Margaret's is located within the village on Church Plain and has been Grade I listed since 1959. The church holds Sunday service every Sunday.

St. Margaret's suffered two devastating fires, one in the Fourteenth Century and another in the Seventeenth Century though a medieval font and Georgian pulpit survive.

== Amenities ==
Facilities in Hempnall include a village hall, playing field, a primary school, and a doctor's surgery. The convenience store, formerly run by RS McColl, was rebranded Morrisons Local in 2023. 'The Hempnall Trust', a village charity, runs The Hempnall Mill Centre at the site of Hempnall Mill.

Hempnall is home to a popular Tennis Club. In the heart of South Norfolk, the club boasts 2 quality floodlit hard courts that can be hired all year round to the public and club members.

== Governance ==
Hempnall is an electoral ward for local elections and is part of the district of South Norfolk.

The village's national constituency is South Norfolk which has been represented by the Labour's Ben Goldsborough MP since 2024.

== Notable residents ==
- Anna Hinderer (1827-1870) Anglican missionary to modern-day Nigeria, born in Hempnall.

== War Memorial ==
Hempnall War Memorial is a wheel-headed cross with a plinth and a rustic base located at the junction of Broaden Street and The Street. The memorial was unveiled in December 1919 by W.H. Couzens-Hardy MP. A plaque was also added for casualties from the Second Boer War:

Rank	Name	Unit	Date of death	Burial/Commemoration
Dvr.	George J. Gowing	Royal Horse Artillery	Unknown	Royal Artillery Memorial
Pte.	George Moore	2nd Bn., Norfolk Regiment	Unknown	Norwich Boer War Memorial
Pte.	Harry Moore	2nd Bn., Norfolk Regt.	Unknown	Norwich Boer War Memorial

The following names are listed for the First World War:

Rank	Name	Unit	Date of death	Burial/Commemoration
Cpl.	Harry Townshend MM	1st Bn., Norfolk Regiment	27 Sep. 1918	Vis-en-Artois Memorial
LCpl.	Charles A. Elvin	9th Bn., Norfolk Regt.	21 Mar. 1918	Arras Memorial
Pte.	Bertie T. Ellis (Note: Private Ellis was discharged in March 1916 and died two years later of tuberculosis.)	Coldstream Guards	1918	Unknown
Pte.	Albert Crummett	6th Bn., Durham Light Infantry	20 Jul. 1917	Achiet-le-Grand Cemetery
Pte.	Richard H. Lansdell	4th Bn., East Yorkshire Regiment	31 Oct. 1917	Mendinghem Cemetery
Pte.	Robert S. Sporle	13th Bn., East Yorkshire Regt.	6 May 1917	Hamburg Cemetery
Pte.	William Ayton	7th Bn., Royal Fusiliers	13 Nov. 1916	Ancre British Cemetery
Pte.	Herbert Townshend	Royal Fusiliers	14 May 1918	St. Sever Cemetery
Pte.	Percy W. Ellis	6th Bn., Middlesex Regiment	30 Dec. 1917	Chatby Memorial
Pte.	Leonard Townshend	1st Bn., Norfolk Regiment	7 Mar. 1915	Menin Gate
Pte.	Sidney G. Varley	1st Bn., Norfolk Regt.	18 Sep. 1916	Guillemont Road Cemetery
Pte.	Thomas Downing	2/6th Bn., Norfolk Regt.	18 Jan. 1915	St. Margaret's Churchyard
Pte.	Walter S. Kirk	7th Bn., Norfolk Regt.	8 Aug. 1918	Morlancourt Cemetery
Pte.	Charles H. Spink (Note: Private Spink died of bronchopneumonia at No. 20 General Hospital near Camiers.)	7th Bn., Norfolk Regt.	3 Dec. 1918	Étaples Military Cemetery
Pte.	Charles Nash	9th Bn., Norfolk Regt.	15 Sep. 1915	Thiepval Memorial
Pte.	Frederick A. Nash	2/4th Bn., Queen's Royal Regiment	21 Dec. 1917	Jerusalem War Cemetery
Pte.	Clarence J. Pointer	10th Bn., Queen's Royal Regt.	27 Mar. 1918	Ontario Cemetery
Rfn.	Arthur Sheldrake	5th Bn., Royal Irish Rifles	23 Mar. 1918	Pozières Memorial
Spr.	John W. Elvin	416th Coy., Royal Engineers	4 Sep. 1918	Quéant Road Cemetery

The following names were added after the Second World War:

Rank	Name	Unit	Date of death	Burial/Commemoration
Sgt.	Jack N. Fraser (Note: Sergeant Fraser was serving as an Observer when his Fairey Battle flying from Villiersfaux was shot down.)	No. 142 Squadron RAF	11 Jun. 1940	St. Sever Cemetery
Cpl.	Charles R. Perkins	Royal Air Force	31 Dec. 1945	Naples War Cemetery
Pte.	Bob E. Roberts	2nd Bn., Lincolnshire Regiment	3 May 1945	Becklingen War Cemetery
Pte.	Reginald C. Gooch	5th Bn., Royal Norfolk Regiment	22 Jan. 1942	Kranji War Cemetery
Pte.	Raymond E. Madgett	6th Bn., Royal Norfolks	21 Jul. 1943	Kanchanaburi War Cemetery
