= Tanimowo Ogunlesi =

Nigerian activist

- Born: 1908
- Died: 2002 (aged 93–94)
- Education: London University
- Alma mater: Kudeti Girls School Ibadan; United Missionary College (UMC)
- Occupation: Founder Proprietress Children Home School Molete Ibadan Women's rights activist
- Known for: Leader of the Women's Improvement League
- Children: Bayo Ogunlesi

Tanimowo Ogunlesi who was born in 1908 and died in 2002 was a Nigerian women's rights activist and the leader of the Women's Improvement League. She was one of the leading women activists of her era and co-founded the National Council of Women's Societies, the country's leading women's rights organization. She was a founding member of the women wing of the Action Group

== Life ==
Tanimowo Ogunlesi was born on 1 December 1908. She attended Kudeti Girls School Ibadan, Oyo State, and attended United Missionary College (UMC) for her teacher's training qualifications. She started teaching in Lagos at CMS Girls’ Seminary School in 1934. She married J.S. Ogunlesi, who was also a teacher, in 1934. Her husband received a scholarship to study in London, which gave her opportunities to relocate to London too. She then continued her education at the nursery school in St. Andrew's University in Scotland, in 1946. Tanimowo and her husband returned to Nigeria in 1947, after her husband was appointed as the Adult Education Officer of the Western Region. She was the first person to establish an elementary boarding school in Ibadan (Children Home School) in 1948.

She became the first president of the National Council of Women's Societies in 1959. She dealt largely on the rights of women to vote and to have access to educational facilities but like most women nationalists of the era, she never really questioned the male dominance of the Nigerian household. She was part of a movement to increase domestic science training in Nigeria when she opened a home training school.

== Political Activism ==
Tanimowo was an active member of the Action Group and founded the women's wing of the party, where she held a prestigious position. In July 1953, she was the only woman in the delegation that traveled to the United Kingdom to discuss Nigeria's independence. She also represented her organization, the Women's Improvement League, at the International Alliance of Women (IAW) conference in Copenhagen.
