= Vivian Fowler Memorial College for Girls =

Location
- Plot 5, Balogun Street, Billingsway Oregun; Ikeja, Lagos, Lagos State; Nigeria
- Coordinates: 6.60878°N 3.36112°E

Information
- School type: High school
- Religious affiliations: Roman Catholic, Christian
- Denomination: Catholic
- Established: 1991 (35 years ago)
- Founder: Chief Mrs. Leila Fowler
- Gender: All-girls
- Website: www.vivianfowler.org

The Vivian Fowler Memorial College for Girls is an all-girls Independent college founded in 1991 by Chief Mrs. Leila Fowler in Nigeria. It is located in the Ikeja suburb of the city of Lagos.

== History ==
Originally located in Surulere, the school was established on January 8, 1991, by Chief Mrs. Leila Fowler. The school was named after her daughter who had died. The school opened at 17, Bola Shadipe St, Surulere Lagos, later moving to No 4, Adedamole Ojomo Close, off Bode Thomas street, Surulere Lagos. The school then relocated to its permanent site in January 2000, This site is located at Plot 5, Balogun Street, Billingsway Oregun, Ikeja Lagos.

== School ==
Academic education in the college takes six years and is made up of three years in Junior Secondary School followed by three years in Senior Secondary School. Classes are offered in English language, French language, Yoruba language, and Igbo language. Senior Secondary School focuses preparation on three main examinations: the West African Senior School Certificate Examination (WASSCE), and the International General Certificate of Secondary Education (IGCSE). Additionally students are prepared for the Test of English as a Foreign Language (TOEFL) and the SAT Reasoning Test (SAT).
