= Kehinde Kamson =

Nigerian businesswoman

- Born: August 14, 1961 (age 65); Lagos, Nigeria
- Education: Bachelor's Degree in Accounting
- Alma mater: Queens College Lagos; University of Lagos; Lagos Business School
- Father: Adeleke Beniah Adelaja

Kehinde Kamson (born 14 August 1961 in Lagos, Nigeria) is a Nigerian entrepreneur, business leader, and philanthropist. She works in the fast food and business sectors in Nigeria. She is best known as the Founder and CEO of Sweet Sensation Confectionery Limited – one of the strongest brands in the fast food industry in Nigeria. She is credited with changing the competitive outlook of the Quick Service Restaurant industry in Nigeria thereby leading to the astronomical growth seen in the industry in the 90s and first decade of the 2000s.

== Early life and education ==
Kamson's parents were educators. Her father, Adeleke Beniah Adelaja, was one of the principals of the Church Missionary Society Grammar School (CMS Grammar School), the oldest secondary grammar school in Nigeria. Kamson’s mother, Omoba Adebayo Evangelin Adelaja, was the proprietress of Eva Adelaja Secondary School, a secondary school in Lagos, Nigeria. Kamson was born a twin on 14 August 1961. The twins were the last of six children.

Kamson’s nursery school was at the International Women's Society Nursery School in Lagos while her primary school was University of Lagos Staff School.

Kamson played high jumping and table tennis in her secondary school, St Anne's School, Ibadan.

Kamson was nominated to represent her school and eventually West Africa in the bid to qualify for the All African Games. She has a gold medal for playing table tennis for West Africa but she didn't make it to the All African games.

She did her A-Levels at Queens College in Lagos and earned a bachelor's degree in Accounting from the University of Lagos, Nigeria. She is also a graduate of the Lagos Business School.

== Business career ==
Kamson founded the Quick Service Restaurant business Sweet Sensation in 1994, operating initially from a small guard house in Ilupeju, Lagos, after spending about a decade running the business on a smaller scale from her family’s garage. The business later expanded into one of Nigeria’s leading Quick Service Restaurant chain, with more than 25 outlets nationwide, over 2,000 employees, and more than 60 meals served daily.

Kehinde was influenced to become an entrepreneur largely by her mother, who travelled internationally to sell things.

After her graduation at the University of Lagos, she got a job as an accountant. Overwhelmed with holding both a 9-to-5 job and raising a family, she decided to start her food business which eventually became Sweet Sensation.
