= Vout's Mill, Hempnall =

Windmill in Hempnall, Norfolk, England

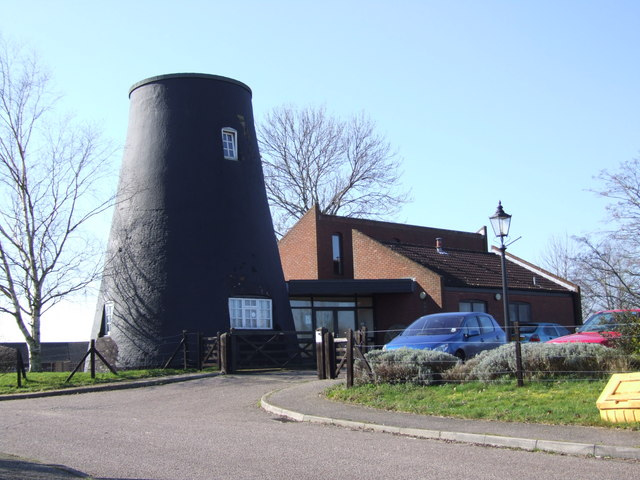
- Vout's Mill, 2007
- Interactive map of Vout's Mill, Hempnall

Origin
- Mill name: Vout's Mill
- Mill location: Hempnall, Norfolk, United Kingdom
- Grid reference: TM 2375 9423
- Coordinates: 52°30′00″N 1°17′42″E
- Operators: Hempnall Town Estate Poor Charity, and; Norfolk County Council
- Year built: 1814

Information
- Purpose: Corn mill
- Type: Tower mill
- Storeys: Four storey tower
- No. of sails: Four
- Type of sails: Patent sails
- Windshaft: Cast iron
- Winding: Fantail
- Fantail blades: Six
- Auxiliary power: Portable steam engine
- No. of pairs of millstones: Two pairs, plus one pair worked by the steam engine
- Size of millstones: 4 feet 0 inches (1.22 m) and 4 feet 3 inches (1.30 m) diameter
- Other information: Website

Vout's Mill is a Grade II listed tower mill at Hempnall, Norfolk, United Kingdom. It was built in 1814. The mill worked by wind until the 1930s, then by engine. It was converted to a daycare centre in 1978.

== History ==
A windmill stood in Hempnall in the late 12th Century. It was given to Bury St. Edmunds Abbey by Walter Fitz Robert between 1170 and 1188. There was a post mill in 1792. A new post mill was built in 1806. Millers were James Carver & Son (James Jr.), with James Sr. alone from 1807. A tower mill was built nearby in 1814. Both mills were offered for sale in 1819. On 31 December 1825, the mill's cap and sails were blown off. The post mill had gone by 1833. Edward Warmoll was the tenant miller in 1833. The mill was sold for £255 in February 1834 to John Thirkettle. Abraham Robinson was the miller from 1836-50. George Arthur Glasspoole was the miller in 1858, then James Buckenham in 1859. The mill was sold for £230 in November 1859 to Thomas Parker of Topcroft post mill. In 1863, he went into partnership with Walter Henry Hylton, who ran Hempnall Green smock mill. The mill was sold in October 1864 to John Hotson. He died in September 1888. The mill was offered for sale by auction in September 1889, but did not sell. Mrs Hotson sold the mill for £100 to Henry Hart, the tenant miller, in April 1898. He leased the mill for £230 to Arthur Salter in March 1900.

Salter was declared bankrupt in May 1901. The mill was offered for sale by auction that month. Auxiliary power at this time was an 8hp portable steam engine by Holmes & Sons of Norwich. The mill was not sold, but was subsequently sold to Walter William Vout of Hardwick post mill in July 1904. He ran both mills until 1915. Vout's mill was sold in June 1915 to Arthur Aldridge of Shotesham St. Mary watermill. It was sold for £300 in June 1919 to Helen Kate Vout. She married Robert Stanley Hanner, who was the miller in 1929. The mill was sold for £420 to George Wellesley Bristow in September 1930. The mill was being worked on two sails at this time, with only the stocks of the second pair in place. Mrs. Bristow was working the mill by engine between 1933 and 1937, the sails having been removed b circa.

The mill was later dismantled by Cecil Thompson, millwright, of Hardwick post mill. On October 1964, the lease on the land expired and the mill became the property of the Feoffees of Hempnall Town Lands. The derelict mill was more a liability than an asset. In 1972, it was recorded as a derelict tower covered in ivy. The cap base carried the windshaft and some machinery survived. In October 1977, the mill was stripped of machinery by Lennard & Lawn, millwrights of Caston. The machinery removed was placed in store for future reuse by the Norfolk Windmills Trust. The mill building was converted to a daycare centre in a joint venture between Norfolk County Council and the Hempnall Town Estate Poor Charity. It was officially opened by Queen Elizabeth the Queen Mother on 16 January 1979. The mill was listed as Grade II on 26 June 1981. In March 2010, the daycare centre was threatened with closure, but this was not carried out and it is thriving as of 2025.

== Description ==
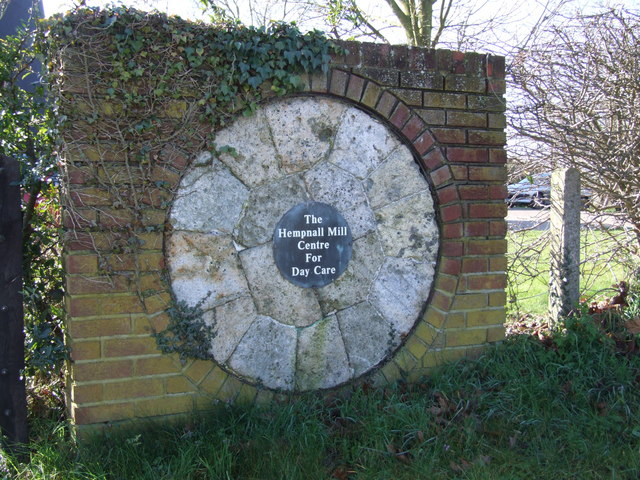
One of the millstones, now used as the centre's sign

. Vout's Mill is a four storey tower mill. It had a boat shaped cap with a petticoat, which was winded by a six-blade fantail. A cast iron windshaft carried four double Patent sails. The outer pair had eight bays of three shutters. The inner pair had seven bays of three shutters and one bay of two shutters. The windshaft was 14 feet 6 inches (4.42 m) long. A clasp arm brake wheel drove the wooden upright shaft via a wallower. The brake wheel had 105 cogs. The upright shaft was sixteen sided and 12 inches (30 cm) diameter. Two pairs of French burr millstones were driven underdrift. These were 4 feet 0 inches (1.22 m) and 4 feet 3 inches (1.30 m) diameter. The stone nuts were 22 inches (56 cm) diameter. A third pair of millstones was driven by the steam engine. The tower is 25 feet (7.6 m) tall, with walls 2 feet 3 inches (69 cm) thick.
