= Achievers University =

Private university in Owo, Nigeria

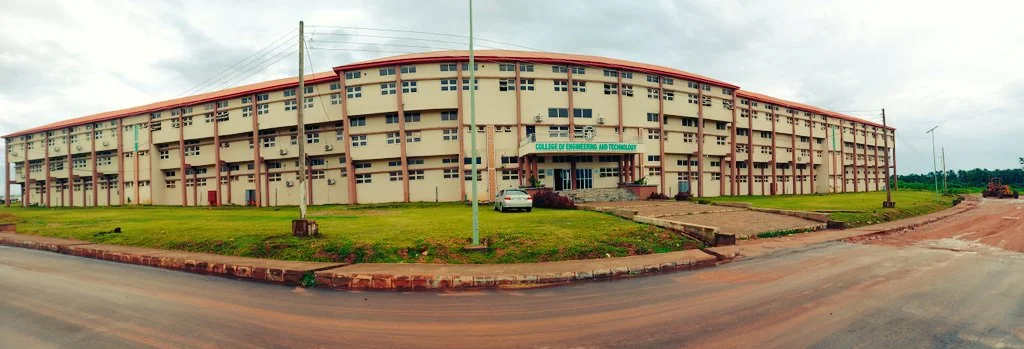
- Achievers crest
- Motto: "Knowledge, Integrity and Leadership".
- Established: 2007; 19 years ago
- Chairman: Bode Ayorinde
- Chancellor: Yakubu Dogara, 14th Speaker of the House of Representatives of Nigeria
- Vice-Chancellor: Prof. Omolola Irinoye; Prof. Oyesoji Aremu (Acting)
- Location: Owo, Ondo, Nigeria; 7.174188°N 5.583249°E
- Campus: Urban
- Website: www.achievers.edu.ng

Achievers University is in Owo, Ondo State, Nigeria.

The university is a private-sector initiative, established in 2007 and accredited by the National Universities Commission. It is located on land in the Idasen community of Owo, consisting of Ulale 1, Ulale 11, Ulema, Ijegunma, Isijogun and Amurin Elegba (formerly Amurin, Ogain).

The university sprang from the Achievers Group of Education and Training Organization, located in Ibadan Oyo State of Nigeria owned and run by Hon (Dr.) Bode Ayorinde. Currently, the university is owned by Hon (Dr.) Bode Ayorinde and other notable personalities: Chief (Mrs.) Toyin Olakunri, Senator T. O. Olupitan, Senator Kolawole (late) among 90 shareholders. The university commenced academic activities during the 2007–2008 academic session and has since then graduated 14 sets of students as at 2025. The University's mission is to provide a supportive physical and academic environment aimed at producing graduates who are self-reliant and productive.

== Ranking ==
In the Nigerian National Universities Commission annual university rankings for 2013, it was rated 53rd.

In 2019, Achievers University is ranked 98th out of 157 private university in Nigeria. The University evaluates applications using a selective admission policy, which is informed by students' previous academic history and marks, with an acceptance rate range of 40-49%.

The university offers pre-and bachelor's degree programs in courses spanning arts, business, and social sciences, as well as science and technology.

In July 2012, it was one of the seven private universities in Nigeria to have its operating license suspended as part of a clampdown on private institutions offering unapproved or low-quality courses and substandard facilities. The license was restored on July 17, 2012, following an inspection by the National Universities Commission.

== Library ==
The library is situated in the main building. It helps to promote reading culture, facilitate teaching and academic research.

=== Lending policy ===
For staff: Four books for the duration of four weeks.

For Students: Two books for the duration of two weeks

=== Library Hours ===
- Mondays: Fridays: 8:00am–7:00pm
- Saturdays: 12:00pm–4:00pm
- Sundays: 12:00pm–4:00pm
- Public Holidays: 12:00pm–4:00pm
- Vacations: 8:00am–5:00pm

== Courses offered ==
Courses approved by the National University Commission include: The National universities commission (NUC), Approved the running of new medical course in the university. The newly approved courses are; pharmacy, medicine and aviation program.

== College of Basic Health Science (COBHS) ==
1. B.Sc. Human Anatomy
2. B.Sc. Human Physiology
3. B.Sc. Public Health
4. B.MLS Medical Laboratory Science
5. B.NSc. Nursing Science
6. Pharm. D. Pharmacy
7. MBBS, Medicine
8. Dr.Physiotherapy.

== College of Engineering and Technology (COET) ==
1. B.Eng. Electrical & Electronics Engineering
2. B.Eng. Computer Engineering
3. B.Eng. Mechanical Engineering
4. B.Eng. Mechatronics Engineering
5. B.Eng. Biomedical Engineering
6. B.Eng. Civil Engineering

== College of Law (COL) ==
1. LL.B. – Bachelor of Laws

The College of Law is an academic division of Achievers University. Established to offer legal education in Nigeria, the college provides training aimed at preparing students for legal practice.

The College commenced academic activities in 2018 following approval from the National Universities Commission and subsequently secured accreditation from the Council of Legal Education, the body responsible for regulating legal education in Nigeria. These approvals positioned the College to admit students into its Bachelor of Laws (LL.B) programme and ensured that its curriculum met national standards for legal training.

The LL.B programme is a comprehensive five-year course designed to provide students with a strong foundation in core areas of law such as Constitutional Law, Criminal Law, Contract Law, Property Law, and Equity and Trusts. The academic structure balances theoretical instruction with practical exposure, enabling students to develop critical thinking, analytical reasoning, and advocacy skills. Through moot court sessions and legal simulations, students gain hands-on experience that prepares them for courtroom practice and professional legal engagements.

Graduates of the College proceeds to the Nigerian Law School as a mandatory step toward being called to the Bar. The academic performance of graduates at the Nigerian Law school has reflected the strength of the training provided, with notable achievements recorded in external professional examinations. This has reinforced the College’s growing reputation as a centre of excellence in private university legal education.

Beyond classroom teaching, the College encourages research and scholarly engagement. Through academic publications and intellectual discourse, it contributes meaningfully to legal scholarship and contemporary debates within the Nigerian legal system. Students are also exposed to leadership development opportunities, ethical formation, and community engagement initiatives that promote responsible legal practice.

The College of Law at Achievers University remains committed to producing graduates who are intellectually sound, professionally competent, and ethically responsible, contributing positively to the legal profession and national development.

== College of Natural and Applied Sciences (CONAS) ==
1. B.Sc. Microbiology
2. B.Sc. Industrial Chemistry
3. B.Sc. Biochemistry
4. B.Sc. Computer Science
5. B.Sc. Geology
6. B.Sc. Plant Science & Biotechnology

== College of Social and Management Science (COSMAS) ==
1. B.Sc. Accounting
2. B.Sc. Business Administration
3. B.Sc. Economics
4. B.Sc. Political Science
5. B.Sc. International Relations (including a three-month French language programme abroad)
6. B.Sc. Public Administration
7. B.Sc. Sociology
8. B.Sc. Criminology & Security Studies
9. History

== College of Medicine (COM) ==
The College of Medicine at Achievers University is a relatively new but rapidly growing centre for medical and health sciences education in Ondo State, Nigeria. It was established as part of the university’s strategic expansion into professional and health‑related programmes and began academic activities after receiving approval from the National Universities Commission (NUC), in October 2023, affirming that its curriculum, facilities, and staffing met national standards for medical education.

The College is currently headed by Prof. J.I. Fatukasi, who is the Provost of the College. The college offers a range of undergraduate programmes designed to train the next generation of healthcare professionals. These include:

- MBBS - Bachelor of Medicine, Bachelor of Surgery
- Doctor of Physiotherapy
- B.Sc. Biochemistry
- B.Sc. Physiology
- B.Sc. Anatomy
- B.Sc. Public Health
- B.Sc. Health and information Management

In line with its commitment to quality, the College has welcomed visits from regulatory and professional bodies such as the Medical and Dental Council of Nigeria (MDCN), which have provided guidance and support to ensure academic excellence in its programmes.

A significant milestone for the College has been the establishment of practical training collaborations. In 2025, Achievers University signed a Memorandum of Understanding (MoU) with the Federal Medical Centre Owo and the Federal Ministry of Health, designating FMC Owo as a teaching hospital. This partnership enhances clinical training opportunities for medical, nursing, pharmacy, and allied health students by providing access to real‑world healthcare facilities and patient care environments.

== Matriculation ==
Achievers University Owo matriculates 1133 newly admitted students on 31 January 2025. The vice chancellor of the university Prof. Omolola Orinoye addressed the newly admitted students in the 18th matriculation ceremony in the school, including about 145 students in the MBBS programme.

Sports and Athletics

The school has made sure its sporting facilities are not left behind in the development of the school. It has a main football field, as well as a mini football field, two main basketball courts, two tennis courts, and two volleyball courts. The hostels were built to have a sport facility in its compound which gives an extra basketball court, volleyball court, and a badminton court

== See also ==
- Rufus Giwa Polytechnic
- Federal Medical Centre
