= Margaret Adebisi Sowunmi =

Nigerian botanist and environmental archaeologist

- Born: September 24, 1939 (age 87); Kano, Nigeria
- Died: April 28, 2025 (aged 85); Ibadan Oyo state
- Citizenship: Nigerian She attended St Anne's School Ibadan for her secondary school education
- Occupation: Environmental archaeologist

Academic background
- Education: University College Ibadan

Academic work
- Discipline: Archaeology, botany
- Sub-discipline: Palynology, paleobotany, archaeobotany
- Institutions: Uppsala University; University College Ibadan; UCL Institute of Archaeology

Margaret Adebisi Sowunmi (née Jadesimi) (September 24, 1939 - April 28, 2025) was a Nigerian botanist and environmental archaeologist. She was Professor of Palynology and Environmental Archaeology at the University of Ibadan. She pioneered the study of environmental archaeology and palaeoethnobotany in Nigeria and was the founder and president of the Palynological Association of Nigeria.

== Early life ==
Sowunmi was born in Kano, Northern Nigeria on September 24, 1939. Her father was a pastor in the Church of Nigeria. She attended St Anne's School Ibadan for her secondary school education. She studied for a BSc in Special Botany in the Department of Botany, at University College Ibadan, graduating in 1962. She received a postgraduate scholarship in 1963 to undertake Phd research in palynology. In order to undertake research in palynology, Sowunmi travelled to Sweden to study with Gunnar Erdtman, who supervised her PhD: "On the Pollen Morphology of the Palmae and its bearing on Taxonomy". She earned her PhD in botany from the University of Ibadan in 1967.

== Career ==
In 1967 Sowunmi was appointed a post-doctoral research fellow in the Archaeology Unit at the Institute of African Studies, University of Ibadan. In 1971 she established the Nigerian University Palynology Laboratory. Sowunmi was appointed Professor of Palynology and Environmental Archaeology in 1982. Throughout her career Sowunmi held various visiting positions, in 1997 in the Department of African Archaeology, Uppsala University, and in 1998 at the Institute of Archaeology, University College London and the Departments of African Archaeology and African Archaeobotany, Johann Wolfgang Goethe-Universität. During the course of her career she supervised eight PhD students, and is noted for being an inspirational teacher. Sowunmi has worked on gender issues in archaeology in Nigeria, including modifying androcentric course titles.

Sowunmi was the founder and president of the Palynological Association of Nigeria, and president of the West African Archaeological Association.

Sowunmi retired in 2004. However, she continued teaching palynology courses and supervising BSc and MSc students until she turned 80 in 2019.

== Research ==
Sowunmi's research achievements include the first identifications of the age and paleoenvironment of the Gwandu Formation, the first descriptions of Eocene pollen of the Ogwashi-Asaba Formation, the first study of Late Quaternary vegetation and environmental history of Nigeria, and the first study of pollen from an archaeological site in Nigeria.

== Awards and honours ==
In 2003, Sowunmi received an honorary Doctor of Philosophy degree in the Humanities by Uppsala University to recognised her outstanding scholarship and research and teaching contributions in environmental archaeology and paleobotany.

== Selected publications ==
- M.A. Sowunmi. 1972. Pollen morphology of the Palmae and its bearing on taxonomy. Review of Palaeobotany and Palynology
- M.A. Sowunmi. 1973. Pollen grains of Nigerian plants: I. Woody species. Grana
- R.J. du Chêne, M.S. Onyike & M.A. Sowunmi 1978. Some new Eocene pollen of the Ogwashi-Asaba Formation, south-eastern Nigeria. Revista Española de Micropaleontología 10(2), p. 285-322.
- M.A Sowunmi. 1981. Aspects of Late Quaternary Vegetational Changes in West Africa. Journal of Biogeography 8: 457-474.
- M.A. Sowunmi. 1985. The beginnings of agriculture in West Africa: botanical evidence. Current Anthropology
- M.A. Sowunmi. 1995. Pollen grains of Nigerian plants: II. Woody Species. Grana 34: 120-141.
- M.A. Sowunmi. 1998. Ecological archaeology in west Africa : the state of the discipline in ANDAH (B.W.) et al., Africa: the challenge of archaeology. Ibadan, Heinemann Educational Books, pp. 65–100
- M.A. Sowunmi, 1998. Beyond academic archaeology in Africa: The human dimension. African Archaeological Review
