= Toyin Olakunri =

Nigerian accountant, philanthropist, and businesswoman (1937–2018)

Olutoyin Olakunri
- Born: November 4, 1937; Lagos, Nigeria
- Died: June 3, 2018 (aged 80)
- Other names: Olusola
- Occupations: Accountant, Stock broker and business woman
- Known for: Africa’s first female Chartered Accountant

Chief (Mrs) Olutoyin Olakunri (OFR) (November 4, 1937 - June 3, 2018) was a Nigerian accountant, philanthropist and businesswoman who was the first female chartered accountant in Africa. In 2000, President Obasanjo appointed her as head of the Education Trust Fund. She was president of the Institute of Chartered Accountants of Nigeria between 1994 and 1995.

Olakunri played a foundation role in the establishment of the Society of Woman Accountants of Nigeria.

== Early life and education ==
Olakunri was born in Lagos to Mr. Akinola and Mrs. Esther Adesigbin, her father was a lawyer from the Layeni-Adesigbin family, owners of Tika Tore Press while her mom was a daughter of Lagos merchant, J.H. Doherty, while growing up, she remained an only child for a long stretch of time.

She attended a primary school in Aba and continued primary education at CMS Girls School Lagos. In 1950, she moved with the school when it relocated to Ibadan and merged with Kudeti Girls School and renamed St Anne's School Ibadan, at thirteen years of age, she moved to United Kingdom to continue her secondary school education at Hawthorns School in Frinton-on-Sea, Essex. While in England she married her first husband, Arthur Ladipo Vigo, in 1957. Upon the counsel of her father and influence of a trader mother, Olakunri chose accountancy as a profession, hoping it will give her the flexibility to work as a mother and also practice.

Olakunri graduated from the University of Birmingham, and did her article-ship with the City of London and Dorset & Co before qualifying as an accountant in 1963. She married her second husband, Simeon Moronfolu Olakunri around 1965. She had seven children.

== Career ==
She then moved back to Nigeria and joined the office of Peat Marwick Cassleton Elliot and Co. In 1965, Olakunri joined the workforce of Nigerian Industrial Development Bank (NIDB) now Bank of Industry a year after it was created. She worked at NIDB for seven years and left as an executive director of ICON Stockbrokers an affiliate of NIDB. Following her exit from the bank, Olakunri managed a stockbroking firm, CTB Stockbrokers which she initially wanted to purchase. However, in 1972, she was able to purchase a plastic making factory in Apapa founded by an Italian expatriate. She also dabbled into the importation of pre-fabricated homes but the business found little success.

In 1977, Olakunri was nominated as a member of the 1977 Constituent Assembly, a gathering of Nigerians to deliberate on a new democratic constitution. A year later, she and fellow female members of ICAN, co-founded the Society of Women Accountants of Nigeria, a body to protect the interest of female accountants in Nigeria.

Olakunri was a founding director of Eko International Bank and Gateway Bank, the former was partly owned by the Lagos State government and the later by Ogun State government.
