= Nigerian National Assembly delegation from Taraba =

Taraba's delegation in Nigeria's National Assembly

The Nigerian National Assembly delegation from Taraba State comprises three Senators and six Representatives.

== Fourth Nigerian Republic ==
=== 6th Assembly (2007–2011) ===
| Senator | Constituency | Party |
|---|---|---|
| Anthony George Manzo | North | PDP |
| Dahiru Bako Gassol | Central | PDP |
| Joel Danlami Ikenya | South | PDP |
| Representative | Constituency | Party |
| Albert Taminu Sam-Tsokwa | Donga/Ussa/Takum/Special Area | PDP |
| Babangida S.M Nguroje | Gashaka/Kurmi/Sardauna | PDP |
| Henry M. Shawulu | Jalingo/Yorro/Zing | PDP |
| Ishaika Moh'd Bawa | Ibi/Wukari | PDP |
| Jerimon S. Manwe | Lau/K/Lamido/Ardo-Kola | PDP |
| Kabiru Jalo | Bali/Gassol | PDP |

=== 9th Assembly (2019–2023) ===
| Senator | Party | Constituency |
|---|---|---|
| Yusuf Abubakar Yusuf | APC | Taraba Central |
| Emmanuel Bwacha | PDP | Taraba South |
| Shuaibu Isa Lau | PDP | Taraba North |
| Representative | Party | Constituency |
| Rimamde Shawulu Kwewum | PDP | Donga/Ussa/Takum/Special Area |
| David Abel Fuoh | APC | Gashaka/Kurmi/Sardauna |
| Kasimu Bello Maigari | APC | Jalingo/Yorro/Zing |
| Usman Danjuma Shiddi | APC | Ibi/Wukari |
| Danladi Baidu Tijos | PDP | Lau/K/Lamido/Ardo-Kola |
| Abdulsalam Gambo Mubarak | APC | Bali/Gassol |

=== 10th Assembly (2023-Present) ===
| Senator | Party | Constituency |
|---|---|---|
| David Jimkuta | APC | Taraba South |
| Manu Haruna | PDP | Taraba Central |
| Shuaibu Isa Lau | PDP | Taraba North |
| Representative | Party | Constituency |
| Ayuba Dampar | APC | Ibi/Wukari |
| David Abel Fuoh | APC | Gashaka/Kurmi/Sarduana |
| Sadiq Abbas Tafida | PDP | Jalingo/Yorro/Zing |
| Jaafaru Chiroma Yakubu | PDP | Bali/Gassol |
| Audu Mohammed Lauya | PDP | Karim Lamido/Lau/Ardo Kola |
| Useni Mark Bako | PDP | Takum/Donga/Ussa |

== See also ==
- Senate of Nigeria
- Nigerian National Assembly
