= 2023 Nigerian Senate elections in Taraba State =

2023 Senate elections in Taraba

← 2019	25 February 2023	2027 →

All 3 Taraba State seats in the Senate of Nigeria
	Majority party	Minority party
Party	APC	PDP
Last election	1	2
Seats before	2	1
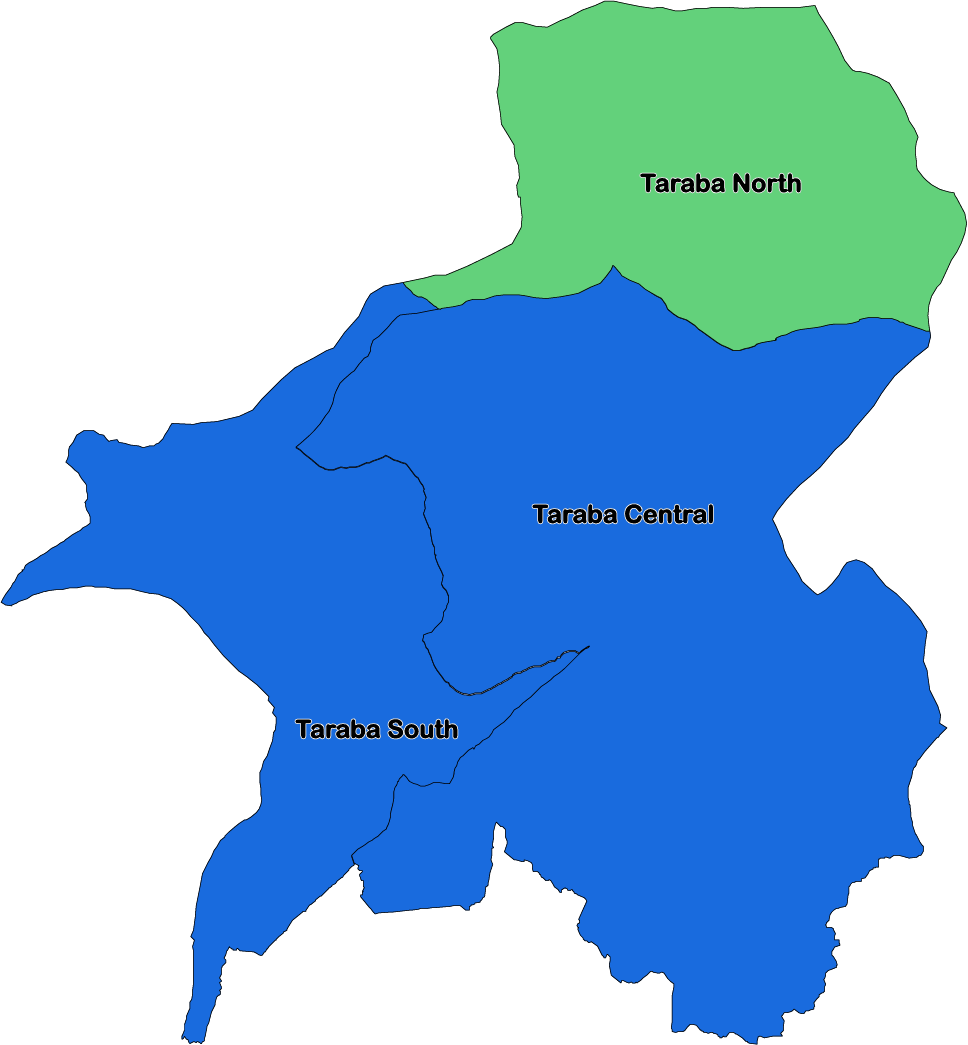
- APC incumbent retiring PDP incumbent running for re-election

The 2023 Nigerian Senate elections in Taraba State will be held on 25 February 2023, to elect the 3 federal Senators from Taraba State, one from each of the state's three senatorial districts. The elections will coincide with the 2023 presidential election, as well as other elections to the Senate and elections to the House of Representatives; with state elections being held two weeks later. Primaries were held between 4 April and 9 June 2022.

== Background ==
In the previous Senate elections, all three incumbent senators were returned with Yusuf Abubakar Yusuf (APC-Central) winning re-election with 45% of the vote while Shuaibu Isa Lau (PDP-North) won re-election with 43% and Emmanuel Bwacha (PDP-South) also was returned with 43%. The senatorial results were an example of the state's competitiveness as the House of Representatives seats were closely split and Abubakar only narrowly won the state in the presidential election. On the state level, the PDP continued its dominance by and winning a majority in the state House of Assembly and holding the governorship.

== Overview ==
Affiliation	Party		Total
Affiliation	APC	PDP	Total
Previous Election	1	2	3
Before Election	2	1	3
After Election	1	2	3

== Summary ==
District	Incumbent		Results	
District	Incumbent	Party	Status	Candidates
Taraba Central	Yusuf Abubakar Yusuf	APC	Incumbent retired New member elected PDP gain	▌Bashir Marafa (APC); ▌ ✓ Haruna Manu (PDP)
Taraba North	Shuaibu Isa Lau	PDP	Incumbent re-elected	▌Ali Sani Kona (APC); ▌ ✓ Shuaibu Isa Lau (PDP)
Taraba South	Emmanuel Bwacha	APC (Note: This senator was elected as a member of the PDP but switched to the APC during their term.)	Incumbent retired New member elected APC hold	▌ ✓ David Jimkuta (APC); ▌Darius Dickson Ishaku (PDP)

== Taraba Central ==
2023 Taraba Central Senatorial District election
← 2019	25 February 2023	2027 →
Nominee	Bashir Marafa	Haruna Manu
Party	APC	PDP
Senator before election
Yusuf Abubakar Yusuf
APC
Elected Senator
TBD

The Taraba Central Senatorial District covers the local government areas of Bali, Gashaka, Gassol, Kurmi, and Sardauna. Incumbent Yusuf Abubakar Yusuf (APC), who was elected with 44.9% of the vote in 2019, declined to seek re-election instead running for governor of Taraba State; Yusuf lost both the initial and rerun APC primaries.

=== General election ===
==== Results ====
2023 Taraba Central Senatorial District election
Party	Candidate	Votes	%
AAC	Adams Nuhu Audu		
ADC	Musa Umar		
APC	Bashir Marafa		
LP	Stephen Danladi Solomon		
NRM	Zaharaddeen Hussaini		
New Nigeria Peoples Party	Bobboi Kaigama		
PDP	Haruna Manu		
SDP	Gilbert Gills Nyanganji		
Total votes			100.00%
Invalid or blank votes			N/A
Turnout			

== Taraba North ==
2023 Taraba North Senatorial District election
← 2019	25 February 2023	2027 →
Nominee	Abubakar Danladi Sani	Shuaibu Isa Lau
Party	APC	PDP
Senator before election
Shuaibu Isa Lau
APC
Elected Senator
TBD

The Taraba North Senatorial District covers the local government areas of Ardo Kola, Jalingo, Karim Lamido, Lau, Yorro, and Zing. Incumbent Shuaibu Isa Lau (PDP), who was elected with 43.3% of the vote in 2019, is seeking re-election.

=== General election ===
==== Results ====
2023 Taraba North Senatorial District election
Party	Candidate	Votes	%
APP	Titus Elijah		
ADC	Muhammad Abdulrashid		
APC	Abubakar Danladi Sani		
APM	Mungo-Park Gajere		
LP	El-Nathan Bila Auta		
NRM	Idris Yola		
New Nigeria Peoples Party	Bako Haruna		
PDP	Shuaibu Isa Lau		
SDP	Innocent Patrick Umar		
ZLP	Nuhu Yakubu		
Total votes			100.00%
Invalid or blank votes			N/A
Turnout			

== Taraba South ==
2023 Taraba South Senatorial District election
← 2019	25 February 2023	2027 →
Nominee	David Jimkuta	Darius Dickson Ishaku
Party	APC	PDP
Senator before election
Emmanuel Bwacha
APC
Elected Senator
TBD

The Taraba South Senatorial District covers the local government areas of Donga, Ibi, Takum, Ussa, and Wukari. Incumbent Emmanuel Bwacha (APC) was elected with 42.6% of the vote in 2019 as a member of the PDP. He defected to the APC in February 2022 and opted to run for governor of Taraba State instead of seeking re-election.

=== General election ===
==== Results ====
2023 Taraba South Senatorial District election
Party	Candidate	Votes	%
ADC	A. Bello		
APC	David Jimkuta		
APGA	Joseph Sule Rishante		
APM	Agbu Bala Zhema		
BP	Pilinga Nubuya		
LP	Joshua Ikitausai Rimantari		
NRM	Ibrahim Idris Musa		
New Nigeria Peoples Party	Ikra Mohamed		
PDP	Darius Dickson Ishaku		
SDP	Michael Magaji		
Total votes			100.00%
Invalid or blank votes			N/A
Turnout			

== See also ==
- 2023 Nigerian Senate election
- 2023 Nigerian elections
- 2023 Taraba State elections
