= Taraba North Senatorial District =

Taraba North Senatorial District is one of the three senatorial districts in Taraba State, Nigeria. The district lies in the northern part of the state, sharing borders with Bauchi and Adamawa States. The district has its roots in the old Gongola State, from which Taraba was carved out in 1991. The region has long been home to various indigenous communities, including the Mumuye, Fulani, Jenjo people, Wurkun, and others. Taraba north senatorial district consists of 6 Local government areas which are: Jalingo, Yorro, Zing, Karim Lamido, Lau, Ardo-Kola.

== List of Senators Representing the District ==
Senators representing Taraba North Senatorial District
No.	Tenure	Senator	Party	Republic	Notes
1	1999–2003	Bala Abdullahi Adamu	PDP	4th	Former Nigerian Ambassador and elder statesman
2	2003–2007	Ambuno Zik Sunday	PDP	5th	Serve one term
3	2007–2011	Anthony George Manzo	PDP	6th	Former medical doctor and ambassador
4	2011–2015	Aisha Alhassan	PDP	7th	Former Deputy Governor of Taraba State
5	2015–2017	Abubakar Sani Danladi	PDP	8th	Sacked by supreme court in June, 2017
6	2017–present	Shuaibu Isa Lau	PDP	8th, 9th and 10th	He was declared the winner after a court ruling on 23 June 2017 He was subsequently reelected for two additional terms

== See also ==
- 2023 Nigerian Senate elections in Taraba State
- 2023 Nigerian Senate election
