= 2019 Nigerian Senate elections in Taraba State =

2019 Nigerian Senate election in Taraba State

The 2019 Nigerian Senate election in Taraba State was held on February 23, 2019, to elect members of the Nigerian Senate to represent Taraba State. Emmanuel Bwacha representing Taraba South and Shuaibu Isa Lau representing Taraba North won on the platform of Peoples Democratic Party, while Yusuf Abubakar Yusuf representing Taraba Central won on the platform of All Progressives Congress.

== Overview ==
Affiliation	Party		Total
Affiliation	APC	PDP	Total
Before Election	1	2	3
After Election	1	2	3

== Summary ==
District	Incumbent	Party	Elected Senator	Party
Taraba South	Emmanuel Bwacha	PDP	Emmanuel Bwacha	PDP
Taraba North	Shuaibu Isa Lau	PDP	Shuaibu Isa Lau	PDP
Taraba Central	Yusuf Abubakar Yusuf	APC	Yusuf Abubakar Yusuf	APC

== Results ==
=== Taraba South ===
A total of 16 candidates registered with the Independent National Electoral Commission to contest in the election. PDP candidate Emmanuel Bwacha won the election, defeating APC Bauka Ishaya Gamgum and 14 other party candidates.

2019 Nigerian Senate election in Taraba State
Party	Candidate	Votes	%
PDP	Emmanuel Bwacha	96,352	
APC	Bauka Ishaya Gamgum	51,921	
Others		77,777	
Total votes		226,050	
PDP hold			

=== Taraba North ===
A total of 19 candidates registered with the Independent National Electoral Commission to contest in the election. PDP candidate Shuaibu Isa Lau won the election, defeating APC Yusuf Ahmed Adamu and 17 other party candidate.

2019 Nigerian Senate election in Taraba State
Party	Candidate	Votes	%
PDP	Shuaibu Isa Lau	113,580	
APC	Yusuf Ahmed Adamu	111,412	
Others		37,509	
Total votes		262,501	
PDP hold			

=== Taraba Central ===
A total of 11 candidates registered with the Independent National Electoral Commission to contest in the election. APC candidate Yusuf Abubakar Yusuf won the election, defeating PDP Dahiru Bako Gassol and 9 other party candidate.

2019 Nigerian Senate election in Taraba State
Party	Candidate	Votes	%
APC	Yusuf Abubakar Yusuf	98,860	
PDP	Dahiru Bako Gassol	95,074	
Others		26,078	
Total votes		220,012	
APC hold			
