= Bridget Twar =

Commissioner for Women Affairs and Child Development, Taraba State
- Incumbent
- Assumed office 2019
- Governor: Darius Ishaku

Personal details
- Born: 16 September 1966 (age 59) Gassol, Taraba State, Nigeria
- Education: Diploma in Public Administration
- Occupation: Politician

Bridget Twar (born 16 September 1966) is a Nigerian politician and Commissioner for Women Affairs and Child Development in Taraba State, Nigeria.

== Education ==
Twar attended Ashitsa Primary School in Wukari in 1971 and completed in 1978. In 1979, she was admitted into Mbiya Government Secondary School Takum and graduated in 1983. She then proceeded to Adamawa State Polytechnic, Yola in 1991 where she obtained a Diploma in Public Administration in 1993. Later, she got admission to study Public Administration in the University of Abuja where she graduated in 2010.

== Personal life ==
Twar was born and raised in Gassol. She is married and has four children.
