= 2015 Nigerian Senate elections in Taraba State =

2015 Nigerian Senate election in Taraba State

The 2015 Nigerian Senate election in Taraba State was held on 28 March 2015, to elect members of the Nigerian Senate to represent Taraba State. Emmanuel Bwacha representing Taraba South and Abubakar Sani Danladi representing Taraba North won on the platform of Peoples Democratic Party, while Yusuf Abubakar Yusuf representing Taraba Central won on the platform of All Progressives Congress.

== Overview ==
Affiliation	Party		Total
Affiliation	PDP	APC	Total
Before Election			3
After Election	2	1	3

== Summary ==
District	Incumbent	Party	Elected Senator	Party
Taraba South			Emmanuel Bwacha	PDP
Taraba North			Abubakar Sani Danladi	PDP
Taraba Central			Yusuf Abubakar Yusuf	APC

== Results ==
=== Taraba South ===
Peoples Democratic Party candidate Emmanuel Bwacha won the election, defeating All Progressives Congress candidate Waziri Salihu and other party candidates.

2015 Nigerian Senate election in Taraba State
Party	Candidate	Votes	%
PDP	Emmanuel Bwacha		
APC	Waziri Salihu		
Total votes			
PDP hold			

=== Taraba North ===
Peoples Democratic Party candidate Abubakar Sani won the election, defeating All Progressives Congress candidate Ali Sani and other party candidates.

2015 Nigerian Senate election in Taraba State
Party	Candidate	Votes	%
PDP	Abubakar Sani Danladi		
APC	Ali Sani		
Total votes			
PDP hold			

=== Taraba Central ===
All Progressives Congress candidate Yusuf Abubakar Yusuf won the election, defeating Peoples Democratic Party candidate Marafa Bashir and other party candidates.

2015 Nigerian Senate election in Taraba State
Party	Candidate	Votes	%
APC	Yusuf Abubakar Yusuf		
PDP	Marafa Bashir		
Total votes			
APC hold			
