= Usman Danjuma Shiddi =

Nigerian politician

Representative for Ibi/Wukari Federal Constituency, Taraba State
- Incumbent
- Assumed office 13 June 2015
- Preceded by: Ishaika Moh'd Bawa

Personal details
- Born: 1967 (age 58–59) Wukari, Taraba State, Nigeria
- Party: All Progressives Grand Alliance (APGA); All Progressives Congress
- Occupation: Politician

Usman Danjuma Shiddi (born 1967, also known as Danji SS) is a Nigerian politician and legislator currently representing the Ibi/Wukari Federal Constituency of Taraba State at the Federal House of Representatives in the Nigerian National Assembly. He previously worked in the Department of State Services (DSS) before entering politics.

== Early life and education ==
Usman Danjuma Shiddi was born in 1967 to Usman Shiddi and Patu Adda. He attended Ebenezer Primary School in Wukari before moving on to Government Day Secondary School, Wukari, and later Government Science Secondary School, Bauchi, where he completed his secondary education in the late 1980s. In the early 1990s, he studied at Bauchi Polytechnic and later obtained a bachelor’s degree in political science from Bayero University, Kano.

== Career in security services ==
During his National Youth Service Corps (NYSC) year, Shiddi joined the Department of State Services (DSS). Over the years, he served in different capacities across Nigeria and rose to the rank of Assistant Director. He also worked as Chief Security Officer to Aliyu Doma, the former governor of Nasarawa State.

== Entry into politics ==
Shiddi first contested for a seat in the House of Representatives under the All Progressives Congress (APC), though unsuccessfully. He later joined the All Progressives Grand Alliance (APGA), under which he was elected to represent the Wukari/Ibi Federal Constituency. He secured re-election for a second term on the APGA platform.

== Political career and party affiliations ==
In the 2019 elections, Shiddi won re-election with 39,312 votes, defeating Yakubu Aliyara of the Action Alliance with 22,147 votes. He served as Chairman of the House Committee on Internal Security during the 9th Assembly and in 2020 defected to the All Progressives Congress (APC).

In 2021, he defected from APGA to the APC, citing divisions within his former party. In 2023, he sought the APC ticket for the Taraba South Senatorial District but lost after the Court of Appeal upheld David Jimkuta’s nomination.

In August 2025, Shiddi resigned from the APC, stating that he had lost confidence in the party’s internal processes and direction.

== See also ==
- List of Hausa people
