= Taraba (disambiguation) =

Taraba is a state in north-eastern Nigeria.

Taraba may also refer to:

- Taraba River, a tributary of the Benue River in Nigeria
- Taraba (bird), the genus of the great antshrike
- Tomáš Taraba, Slovak politician
