= Materum =

Materum may refer to:

- Materum (surname), a surname among people of Filipino descent.
- Materum, Nigeria, a city in the eastern half of Nigeria
- Materum Hill, a.k.a. Matarum Hill, a hill in Nigeria
