= Kasimu Bello Maigari =

Nigerian politician

Member of the House of Representatives
- In office 2019–2023
- Constituency: Jalingo/Yorro/Zing Federal Constituency

Personal details
- Born: March 6, 1980 (age 46) Taraba State, Nigeria
- Party: All Progressives Congress
- Occupation: Politician

Kasimu Bello Maigari(born on March 6, 1980), is a Nigerian politician who served as a member of the House of Representatives, representing the Jalingo/Yorro/Zing Federal Constituency in Taraba State from 2019 to 2023, under the umbrella of the All Progressives Congress (APC).Shamsudeen Bala Mohammad
