= Jenjo people =

Ethnic group in Nigeria

Total population
- 100,000 (2020)

Languages
- Nwai'dza

Related ethnic groups
- Mumuye; Bata; Jukun

The Jenjo, also known as Janjo, Jen, Dza, Gwomo, and Karenjo, are an ethnic group in Nigeria. They are mostly found in Karim Lamido, Jalingo and Ibi in Taraba State. The Jenjos speak the Jen language which is under the Bikwin–Jenan branch of the Adamawa languages. The population of the Jenjo people today is around 100,000 people.

== Origin ==
The Jenjo people are of Bata origin, they migrated into the area known as Taraba state today from either Lamurde or Numan in today's Adamawa state. This migration was likely a result of a conflict between them and the Bata rulers. They are known to have features similar to Nilotic people. The men tend to be relatively tall of about 6 feet, with several of them as tall as 6 ft. 4 or 5 inches. According to Jenjo oral tradition, they came from a region called Za.

The Jenjo people later played an instrumental role in the establishment of the Muri emirate resulting from their early alliance with the Fulbe jihadists. The Fulbe, who were the first settlers of Muri, migrated to Muri across the River Benue. They moved down south into Muri and the region around the lower basin of the River Gongola. They quickly befriended the Jenjo communities, particularly in Kiri, towards the end of the seventeenth century, two centuries before the jihad. This friendly relationship between these two groups have remained till date. This was further strengthened by frequent intermarriages between the two. These intermarriages were encouraged by Muhammad Nya, Emir of the Muri emirate, who reigned between 1874 and 1896.

== Traditional religion ==
The traditional religion of the Jenjo people is that of the Jukun. The name of their god is Fi and they associate it with the Sun which is similar to the Jukun who associate their god, Chi-dô, with the Sun (nyunu). There is a possibility that Fi is a variant of Shi or Chi, a word which is used all over Africa with the meaning of "The Lord". The Jenjo also have a second deity, Ma, who was at once the coadjutor and servant of Fi. The Jukun also have a second deity called Ama or Ma, who is 'the creator' and earth-deity. Both the Jenjo and Jukun believe that this second deity created and designed all living beings. He has deities under him like Umwa (the god of war and hunting), Nimbwi (the whirlwind) and Kue, 'the policemen' who hear everything and punish blasphemy.

The Jenjo believe in reincarnation. They believe that an enemy killed in war can be reborn through the wife of their slayer. It is said that during times of war, when a woman becomes restless and/or showed signs of hysteria, it is presumed that her unborn child is the slain enemy. It is said, however, that if the enemy saw the slayer as evil, he would not choose to be reborn through the slayer's wife, and that he would pursue his slayer and waste his strength away.

== Notable Jenjo people ==
- Mohammed Shata – former Minister of State for Internal Affairs (1999 - 2003)
