= John Dankaro =

Nigerian footballer

John Dankaro was a former Nigerian football player who was a member of the "UK Tourists", described as Nigeria's first national football team. He was one of the few players on the team who never played for a Lagos club and the only one from the Northern region of the country.

== Life ==
Dankaro hailed from Takum. He attended Kaduna College where he rose to become a high school football star. After school, he played mostly in the local Plateau league where he was the star of the Amalgamated Tin Mining Company's football squad. In 1949, he was selected as the left-half of the Nigeria touring team which played some matches with amateur clubs in the U.K. and the first international match for the country in Sierra Leone.

In 1953, he returned to London to study at the London School of Economics. While there he played for local teams Leyton and Romford. He then went on to work for Amalgamated Tin Mining Company and later became a businessman. His brother, Sunday Dankaro was also a Plateau league star and later became the chairman of Nigeria Football Association.

== Sources ==
- Boer, Wiebe Karl (2003). Nation building exercise: Sporting culture and the rise of football in colonial Nigeria (Thesis). Yale University.
