= David Abel Fuoh =

Nigerian politician

David Abel Fuoh (born 15 April 1968) is a Nigerian politician representing the Gashaka/Kurmi/Sardauna Federal Constituency of Taraba State in the House of Representatives. He is a member of the All Progressives Congress (APC).
