= Mumuye people =

African ethnic group in Nigeria

Mumuye
Total population
- 400,000 (1993)

Regions with significant populations
- Taraba State (Nigeria)

Languages
- Mumuye, English

Religion
- Traditional African religions, Christianity, and Islam

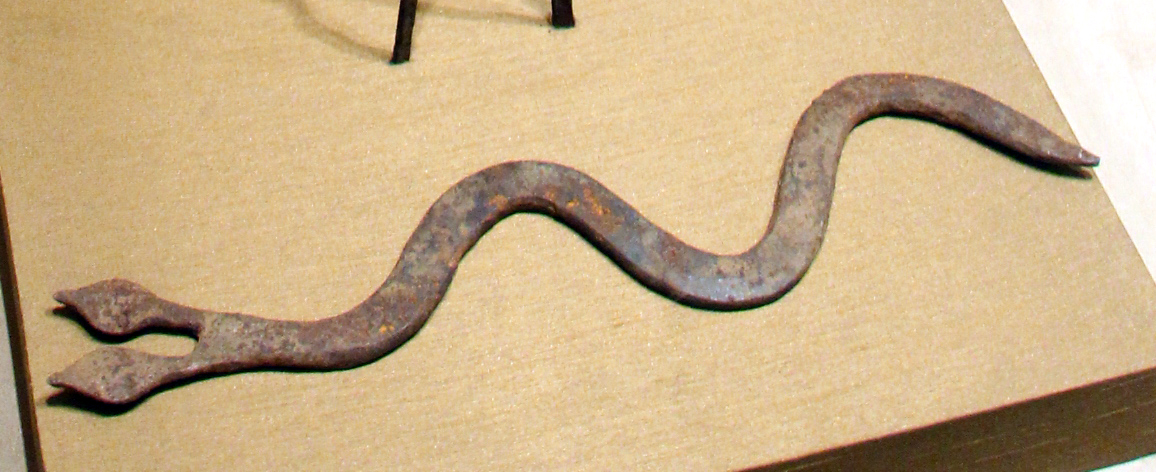
Rainmaking rod used by Mumuye.

The Mumuye are people of the Taraba State, Nigeria. They speak the Mumuye language. They constitute the largest tribal group in Taraba State of Nigeria and form the predominant tribes found in Zing, Yorro, Jalingo, Ardo-Kola, Lau, Gassol, Bali and Gashaka, all of which are local government areas of the state. The Mumuye people are also found in many parts of the neighboring Adamawa State.

The Mumuye people are isolated into smaller groups. These groups are independent of one another; however, they speak a variation of the same language and share cultural traditions. The Mumuye people are a part of the Benue River Valley. The Benue River Valley has been overlooked because of its complexities and innumerable cultures occupying the area.

== Social structure ==
Historically, the Mumuye did not have a central government. Currently, people live in small villages consisting of a number of extended families.These groups are called dola. The culture differs within Mumuye subgroups because of their isolation into these dola. These social groups are governed by a council of elders and an elected leader.

== Benue River Valley ==
The Benue River Valley is home to many different groups, including the Mumuye. One thing that seems to be shared within these groups is a spiritual attachment to the land.

Throughout the Benue the human figure is a common mode of expression. In fact, some Mumuye sculpture was wrongly attributed to the neighboring Chamba people, because of how prevalent the figure is. These figures typical of the Benue River Valley can represent chiefs, ancestors, or heroes. Smaller figures are used for personal protection; these are typically made of clay and thought to bring good luck and success.Although humans are represented greatly, this human involvement does not extend into the spirit world. The spirit world is thought of by much of the Benue River Valley as calm and rarely affected by the human world.Many of the figures made by the people of the Benue River Valley are androgynous. The Mumuye's figures are no exception.

== Culture ==
The Mumuye are considered the second largest indigenous group, after the Tiv, of the Middle Benue.

The Mumuye have masquerades to strengthen community ties. One of these is the Vabon masquerade, a funeral masquerade, that encompasses all of the community.

The culture differs within Mumuye subgroups because of their isolation.

The Mumuye have different ceremonies, one of which is the Ushavuko, which occurs twice a year.

the Mumuye people use scarification for initiation rites. The Mumuye women in particular go through scarification before they are wed, this is present in the sculpture as well. Other Mumuye scarification includes three horizontal rows of cuts that divide the face into thirds.

== Religion ==
The Mumuye's spirituality is governed by a secret society called the Vabong. within the Vabong there are seven levels. The initiation into the society is intense often involving beating. It also involves an explanation of the masks as well as other objects used for divination.

In Mumuye religion rainmakers protect the community. They are considered the most powerful to ensuring the community thrives.

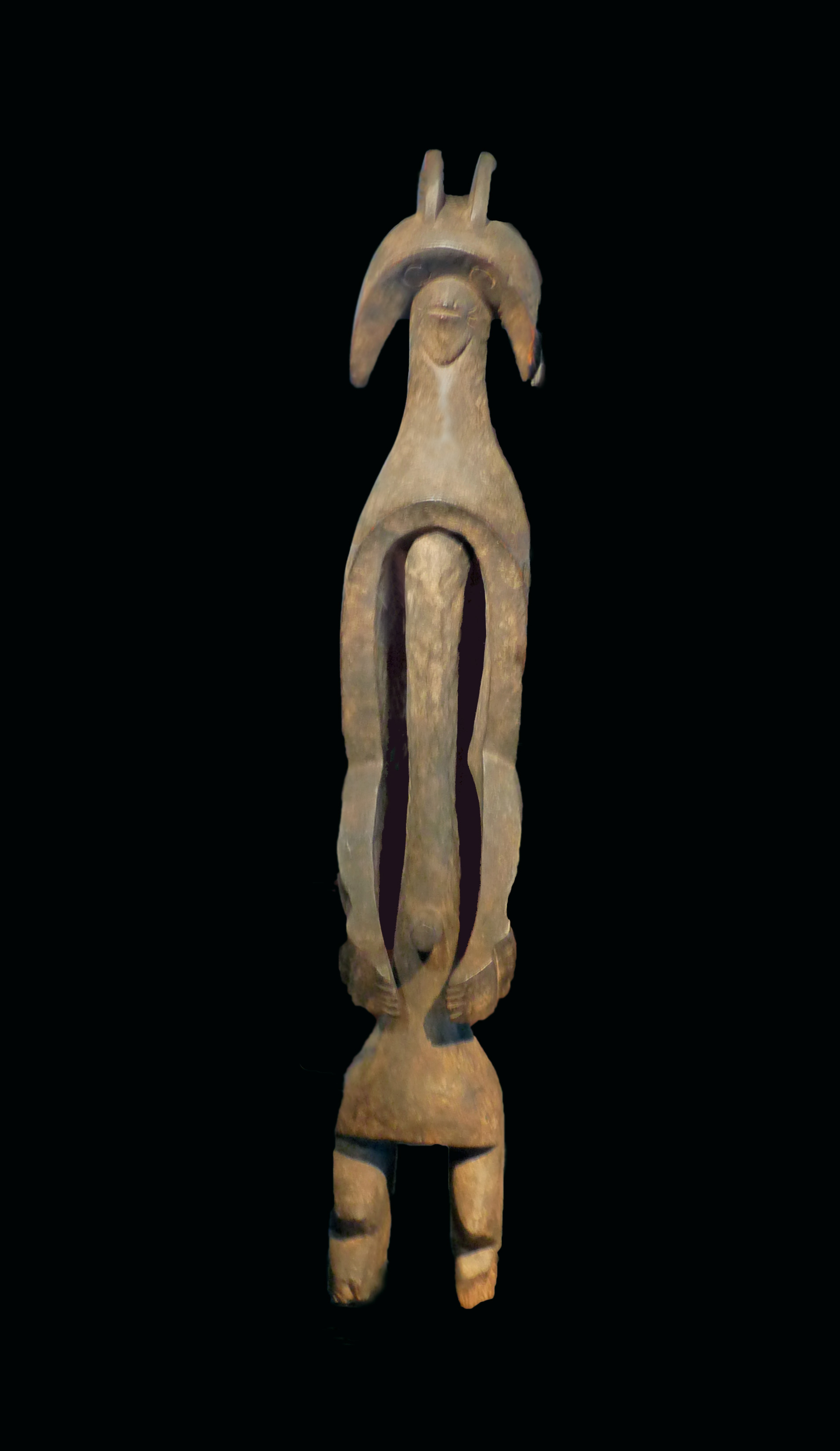
Iagalagana that showcases the undulating lines that are typical of Mumuye figurative carvings.

Mumuye people use rainmaking rods. These are much like lightning rods that protect homes against being struck by lightning. These rods are in a z shape, like lightning. This is also thought to represent the movement of snakes. Some even have a head on the end of them that is like the shape of a snake's head. These rods represent fertility of the land, and the people.

Sometimes Sukuru masks are worn for rainmaking rites. This mask depicts an old woman with pierced ears. The tradition of piercing ears is an ancient tradition of the Mumuye.

The Iagalagana is a figurative sculpture that is used for divination, powers for bestowing good luck and warding off evil, and for its ability to make rain. These are kept in a separate hut and kept by someone thought to have magical powers. These figures are carved by blacksmiths or weavers. Illustrating the prestige of blacksmithing and weaving within Mumuye culture.

== Artistic tradition ==
The Mumuye people have a rich artistic tradition, much of which is figurative and linked to their religious practices. The figural sculptures are used for divination and for healing.They have also been considered to greet people into the rainmaker's hut, guard homes, act as judges within trials, and as confidants. These sculptures are called Iagalagana. This is what the Mumuye are mainly known for.

The Iagalagana typically have elongated features and large ear lobes, due to the tradition of inserting discs into the ears. The sculptures with these large earlobes have been determined to be female according to the Mumuye.

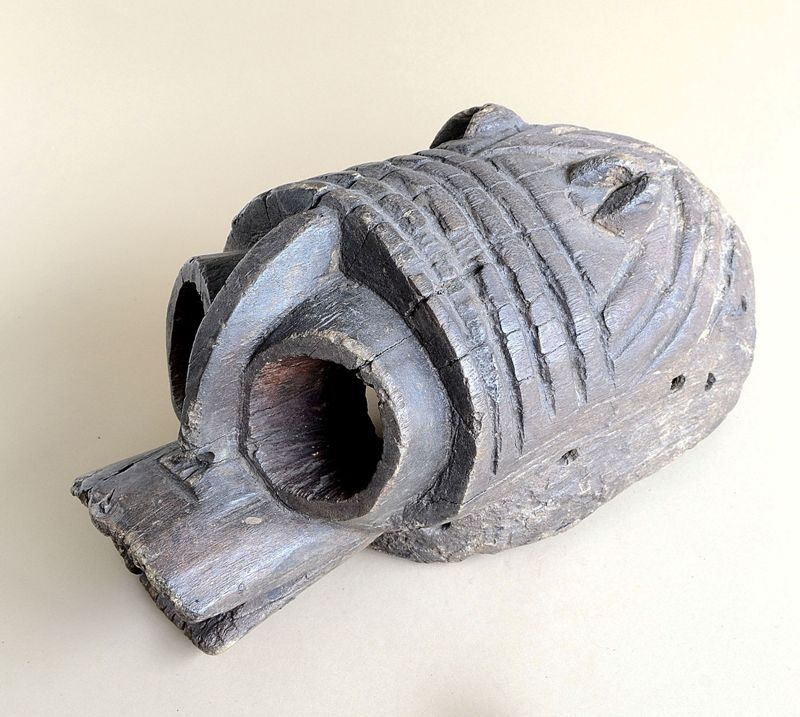
Mask used by the Mumuye during initiation rites.

Sculpture created by the Mumuye people is very diverse, varying in size and shape. Some of the figures are short and squat while others are elongated. While differing in size they are stylized in a similar fashion, making them identifiable as Mumuye. The variation shows the artistic tradition that illuminates the human form in interesting and innovative ways.

The figurative sculptures almost always have an exaggerated navel. Sometimes it is even protruding outward. Genitalia is typically absent or understated.

There are two types of masks found within Mumuye culture. There is the Sukwava mask. This shows a long neck and large ears. These were traditionally worn during ceremonies before war. Currently, they are used for healing, and rainmaking. The other mask worn by the Mumuye is a face mask used for initiation. This mask has hallowed out eyes. It has animalistic features, and a skeletal quality. This creation is consistent with the tradition of human-animal fusion within masks.

== "Flight" of Mumuye sculpture ==
Mumuye sculpture was acquired at the apex of the Biafran war, when the border control was at its weakest. There was an incredible number of sculptures removed.
