= Taraba South Senatorial District =

Taraba South Senatorial District encompasses five local government areas: Donga, Ibi, Takum, Ussa, and Wukari. David Jimkuta is the current senator representing the district after winning in the 2023 Nigerian general election.

== List of Senators Representing the District ==
Below are the list of senators representing the Taraba South senatorial district since 1999 to date:

Senator	Party	Year	Assembly
Dalhatu Umaru Sangari	PDP	1999–2003	4th
Danboyi Usman	PDP	2003–2007	5th
Emmanuel Bwacha	PDP	2011–2023	7th 8th 9th
David Jimkuta	APC	2023–present	10th

== See also ==
- 2023 Nigerian Senate election
- 2023 Nigerian elections
