= Materum, Nigeria =

City in Nigeria

Coordinates: 9°15′0″N 10°56′0″E

Materum, Nigeria is a city located in the Karim Lamido Local Government Area in Taraba State region of Nigeria, Africa. Materum has a river that runs straight through the city itself.
