= Federal Polytechnic, Bali =

University in Bali, Nigeria

Coordinates: 7.88393°N 10.97756°E

Federal Polytechnic Bali
- Type: Public
- Established: 2007
- Rector: Dr Mohammed Usman
- Location: Bali, Taraba State, Nigeria

Federal Polytechnic Bali is a fast growing federal government institution located in Bali, Taraba State, Nigeria. It was established vide the Federal Executive Council approval of Wednesday 14th March, 2007. Following the approval, the Federal Ministry of Education appointed a Ministerial Task Force under the Chairmanship of the immediate past Executive Secretary of the National Board for Technical Education Dr. Nuru Yakubu to ensure a speedy take-off. The current Rector is Dr Mohammed Usman.

== Courses ==
The institution offers the following courses:

- Office Technology And Management
- Statistics
- Computer Science
- Science Laboratory Technology
- Accountancy
- Agricultural Technology
- Agric and Bio-environmental Engineering Technology
- Animal Health and Production
- Civil Engineering
- Building Technology
- Electrical Electronic Engineering
- Public Administration
- Business Management and Technology
- Banking and Finance

=== Programmes ===
- Higher National Diploma
- National Diploma
- National Diploma Distance Learning
- Ordinary Diploma
- Certificate Courses
