= David Jimkuta =

Nigerian politician

Senator for Taraba South
- Incumbent
- Assumed office 13 June 2023 Serving with Shuaibu Isa Lau; Haruna Manu
- Preceded by: Emmanuel Bwacha

Personal details
- Party: All Progressives Congress
- Occupation: Politician

David Jimkuta is a Nigerian politician who is serving as the senator representing the Taraba south senatorial district since 2023. He was elected in the 2023 Nigerian Senate elections on the platform of the All Progressives Congress. He defeated the candidate of the Peoples Democratic Party, incumbent governor of Taraba State, Darius Ishaku.

== Political career ==
Jimkuta won the nomination of APC with 170 votes to beat his rival and the incumbent House of Representatives member for Wukari/Ibi Federal Constituency Danjuma Shiddi who polled 70 votes. However, instead of Jimkuta's name, his party submitted the name of Danjuma Shiddi to the Independent National Electoral Commission (INEC), as its nominee instead of his own name (Jimkuta). He challenged the decision of the party at the Federal High Court in Jalingo but lost the case as the court held that Danjuma Shiddi was the rightful candidate of the APC. Jimkuta then filed an appeal at the Federal Court of Appeal, Abuja which nullified the decision of the APC and set aside the judgment of Federal High Court in Jalingo which declared Shiddi as the candidate of the APC. The court of appeal held that Jimkuta was the candidate validly nominated by the National Working Committee (NWC) of the party and ordered INCE to publish the name of Jimkuta as the candidate of the party Taraba South Senatorial District. Danjuma Shiddi reject the judgement of the Court of Appeal and filed an appeal at the Supreme Court but his appeal failed as the Supreme Court up held the judgment of the court of appeal.

In the 2023 Senate election, Jimkuta polled 85,415 votes to defeat his opponent and the incumbent governor of Taraba State Darius Ishaku who scored 45,708 votes. Jimkuta win over Darius is recorded as one of the major political upsets in the 2023 general elections. On 8 April 2023, just weeks after his election to the senate, his party announced the expulsion of Jimkuta from APC citing anti-party activities of Jimkuta.
