= Taraba Central Senatorial District =

Taraba Central Senatorial District consists of 5 local government areas: Bali, Gashaka, Gassol, Kurmi, and Sardauna. Haruna Manu, the senator representing Taraba Central.

== List of Senators Representing the District ==
Below are the list of senators representing the Taraba South senatorial district since 1999 to date:

Senator	Party	Year	Assembly
Abdulazeez Ibrahim	PDP	1999–2007	4th, 5th
Dahiru Bako Gassol	PDP	2007-2011	6th
Abubakar Umar Tutare	PDP	2011–2015	5th
Yusuf Abubakar Yusuf	APC	2015–2023	8th 9th
Haruna Manu	PDP	2023–present	10th
