= Emmanuel Bwacha =

Nigerian politician (born 1962)

Emmanuel Bwacha CON

Senator for Taraba South
- In office 6 June 2011 – 11 June 2023 Serving with Shuaibu Isa Lau; Yusuf Abubakar Yusuf
- Preceded by: Joel Danlami Ikenya
- Succeeded by: David Jimkuta

Deputy Senate Minority Leader
- In office 2 July 2019 – 3 February 2022
- Preceded by: Abiodun Olujimi
- Succeeded by: Shuaibu Isa Lau

Vice-Chairman of the Senate Committee on Work
- In office 2 July 2019 – 11 June 2023
- Preceded by: Bukkar Abba Ibrahim

Member of the House of Representatives of Nigeria from Taraba
- In office 3 June 2003 – 5 June 2007
- Constituency: Donga/Ussa/Takum

Personal details
- Born: 15 December 1962 (age 63) Donga, Northern Region (now in Taraba State), Nigeria
- Party: All Progressives Congress (since 2022)
- Other political affiliations: Peoples Democratic Party (1998–2022)
- Occupation: Politician

Emmanuel Bwacha CON (born 15 December 1962) is a Nigerian politician who served as the senator representing the Taraba South senatorial district from 2011 to 2023. He was elected on the platform of the Peoples Democratic Party (PDP) in 2011, and was reelected under the same party in the 2015 and 2019 general elections.

== Early life, education, and career ==
Bwacha was born in the Donga Local Government Area of Taraba State.

He has an Education Diploma in Public Administration from the University of Calabar.

A public servant, he served as Commissioner of Agriculture for Taraba State between 1999 and 2003 in the Jolly Nyame administration.

Bwacha was elected to the Federal House of Representatives for the Donga / Ussa / Takum Constituency, serving from May 2003 to May 2007.

He was Chairman of the House Committee on Police Affairs.

In the April 2007 elections he lost his bid for the Senate seat.

== Nigerian Senate ==
The favorite of governor Danbaba Suntai, Bwacha won the Peoples Democratic Party (PDP) primaries for the Taraba South senate seat in January 2011 without opposition from the incumbent Senator Joel Danlami Ikenya, who was running for election as governor.

On 9 April 2011 elections Bwacha received 106,172 votes, ahead of Aliyu of the Action Congress of Nigeria (ACN) with 80,256 votes. Senator Bwacha is the Governorship candidate of the APC in Taraba State.
