= Haruna Manu =

Nigerian politician (born 1973)

Senator for Taraba Central
- Incumbent
- Assumed office 13 June 2023
- Preceded by: Yusuf Abubakar Yusuf

Deputy Governor of Taraba State
- In office 29 May 2015 – 29 May 2023
- Governor: Darius Ishaku
- Preceded by: Abubakar Sani Danladi
- Succeeded by: Aminu Abdullahi Alkali

Member of the House of Representatives of Nigeria from Taraba
- In office 6 June 2011 – 29 May 2015
- Constituency: Bali/Gassol

Personal details
- Born: 23 August 1973 (age 53) Mutum-Biyu, Gassol, North-Eastern State (now in Taraba State), Nigeria
- Party: Peoples Democratic Party
- Education: Ahmadu Bello University; Carnegie Mellon University
- Occupation: Politician; engineer

Haruna Manu (born 23 August 1973) is a Nigerian politician who is the current senator representing Taraba Central Senatorial District since 2023. He previously served as the deputy governor of Taraba State from 2015 to 2023, and as member of the House of Representatives for Bali/Gassol Federal Constituency from 2011 to 2015. He is a member of the Peoples Democratic Party.

== Early life and education ==
Haruna Manu was born on 23 August 1973, in Mutum-Biyu, Gassol Local Government Area of present-day Taraba State. He has a first degree in Business Administration with specialization in Finance from the prestigious Ahmadu Bello University in Zaria, Kaduna State. He also holds a master's degree in Electronic Commerce from Carnegie Mellon University in the United States of America, and he is a certified Microsoft System Engineer. He has working experience with the Nigeria Liquefied Natural Gas (NLNG) and later worked with MTN Nigeria communication Limited before finally settling down to pioneer many start-up firms.

== Political career ==
Manu joined the Peoples Democratic Party in late 2010 and won the primary ticket for the Bali/Gassol Federal Constituency seat of the National Assembly. He won the election and represented Bali/Gassol Federal Constituency at the National House of Representatives from 2011 to 2015. He was the deputy chairman, House Committee on Banking and Currency, and a member of various committees in the House of Representatives during his tenure at the National assembly. Having served his constituency well, his performance was responsible for the decision to choose him as the running mate to Darius Ishaku on the platform of the Peoples Democratic Party in the 2015 general elections.
