= Ibi, Taraba State =

Ibi
- LGA and town
- Interactive map of Ibi
- Location in Nigeria
- Coordinates: 8°19′N 9°51′E
- Country: Nigeria
- State: Taraba State

Government
  - Local Government Chairman and the Head of the Local Government Council: Iliya Muhammad Ajibu

Area
  - Total: 2,672 km^{2} (1,032 sq mi)

Population (2006 census)
  - Total: 84,054
  - Density: 31.46/km^{2} (81.47/sq mi)
- Time zone: UTC+1 (WAT)
- 3-digit postal code prefix: 620
- ISO 3166 code: NG.TA.IB

Ibi is a town and administrative district in Taraba State, Nigeria. The town is located on the south bank of the Benue River, opposite the influx of the much smaller Shemankar River. Both the Taraba River and the Donga River flow into the Benue within the LGA.

Ibi is one of the sixteen local government areas of Taraba State, and is governed by an elected chairman. There are 10 Wards in IBI local government area namely: Dampar I, Dampar II, Dampar III, Ibi Nwonyo I, Ibi Nwonyo II, Ibi Rimi Uku I, Ibi Rimi Uku II, Sarkin Kudu I, Sarkin Kudu II, Sarkin Kudu III

== History ==
Ibi is located where the traditional land trade route of eastern Igboland crossed the river trade route of the Benue River. it is home to the Jukun Wanu and Wurbo people who are predominantly fishermen (especially those along the river bank) (up river). By 1899 the Niger Company established a trading station at Ibi, and by 1901 telegraph service to Lokoja had been established. The British took control in 1900 and established Ibi as the administrative headquarters of western Muri. As cotton was one of the major crops of the area, steam powered cotton gins were established in Ibi in the early 1920s.

== Climate ==
Climate data for Ibi, Nigeria
Month	Jan	Feb	Mar	Apr	May	Jun	Jul	Aug	Sep	Oct	Nov	Dec	Year
Record high °C (°F)	38.5 (101.3)	40.5 (104.9)	41.0 (105.8)	39.5 (103.1)	38.5 (101.3)	34.5 (94.1)	33.0 (91.4)	33.5 (92.3)	33.5 (92.3)	35.0 (95.0)	36.0 (96.8)	36.5 (97.7)	41.0 (105.8)
Mean daily maximum °C (°F)	35.0 (95.0)	36.7 (98.1)	37.1 (98.8)	35.5 (95.9)	32.5 (90.5)	30.9 (87.6)	30.0 (86.0)	29.8 (85.6)	30.5 (86.9)	31.3 (88.3)	33.4 (92.1)	33.9 (93.0)	33.1 (91.6)
Daily mean °C (°F)	26.8 (80.2)	28.6 (83.5)	30.6 (87.1)	30.0 (86.0)	26.8 (80.2)	26.6 (79.9)	26.0 (78.8)	26.0 (78.8)	26.3 (79.3)	26.7 (80.1)	27.0 (80.6)	25.8 (78.4)	27.4 (81.3)
Mean daily minimum °C (°F)	18.5 (65.3)	20.5 (68.9)	24.2 (75.6)	24.4 (75.9)	23.1 (73.6)	22.2 (72.0)	22.1 (71.8)	22.3 (72.1)	22.1 (71.8)	22.1 (71.8)	20.7 (69.3)	17.8 (64.0)	21.7 (71.1)
Record low °C (°F)	13.0 (55.4)	13.5 (56.3)	16.5 (61.7)	19.5 (67.1)	20.0 (68.0)	19.5 (67.1)	19.5 (67.1)	19.5 (67.1)	19.5 (67.1)	18.5 (65.3)	14.0 (57.2)	11.0 (51.8)	11.0 (51.8)
Average precipitation mm (inches)	1 (0.0)	2 (0.1)	28 (1.1)	96 (3.8)	163 (6.4)	193 (7.6)	131 (5.2)	137 (5.4)	226 (8.9)	138 (5.4)	9 (0.4)	7 (0.3)	1,131 (44.5)
Average precipitation days (≥ 0.3 mm)	0	0	1	4	9	11	11	12	14	9	1	0	72
Average relative humidity (%) (at 07:00 LST)	62	64	76	85	92	95	94	95	95	95	93	77	85
Mean monthly sunshine hours	260.4	259.9	251.1	219.0	238.7	195.0	173.6	155.0	177.0	244.9	270.0	282.1	2,726.7
Mean daily sunshine hours	8.4	9.2	8.1	7.3	7.7	6.5	5.6	5.0	5.9	7.9	9.0	9.1	7.5
Source: Deutscher Wetterdienst
