= Taraba River =

River in Nigeria

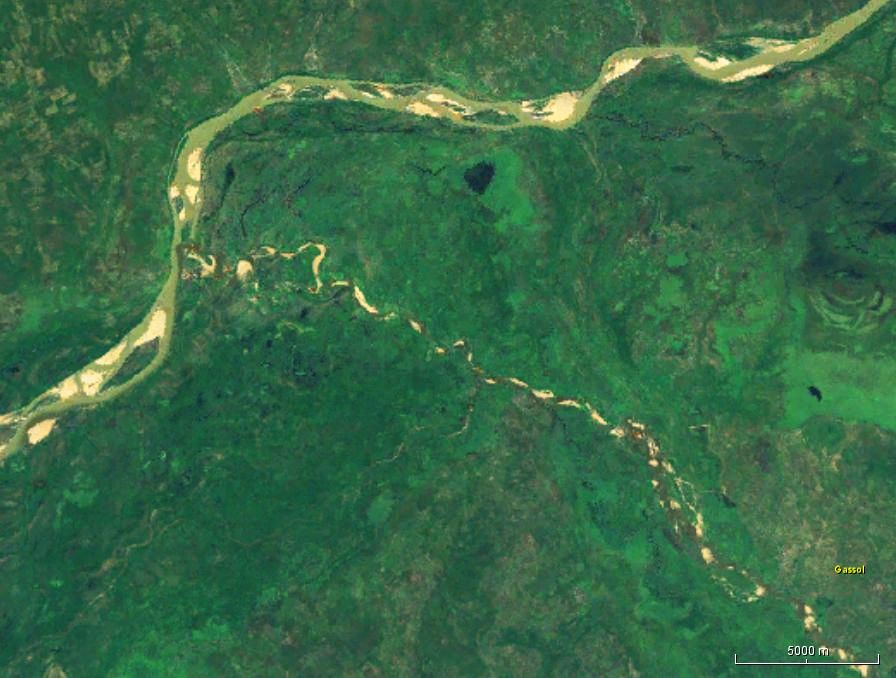
Satellite image of the Tabara river as it joins the Benue river

The Taraba River is a river in Taraba State, Nigeria, a tributary of the Benue River. It joins the Benue on a floodplain 10 km wide and 50 km across.

The major towns along the River Taraba are Sert-Baruwa, Sarki Ruwa, Karamti, Jamtari, Gangumi, Gayam and Bali LGA. The major economic activities on the river are fishing, farming of rice, yam and groundnut.

The major ethnic groups inhabiting the river are the Fulani and the Chamba.

== Pollution ==
The governor of Taraba State, Agbu Kefas ordered the suspension of all mining activities to protect the environment and promote sustainable growth because the increase in mining activity in the state resulted in deforestation, water pollution, and a loss of biodiversity.
