= Shuaibu Isa Lau =

Nigerian politician (born 1960)

Senator for Taraba North
- Incumbent
- Assumed office 5 July 2017 Serving with Haruna Manu; David Jimkuta
- Preceded by: Abubakar Sani Danladi

Personal details
- Born: 27 November 1960 (age 65) Lau, Northern Region (now in Taraba State), Nigeria
- Party: Peoples Democratic Party
- Spouse: Fati Ibrahim Hassan Lau
- Education: General Murtala Muhammed College, Yola (WAEC); Ahmadu Bello University (B.Eng)
- Occupation: Politician; businessman

Shuaibu Isa Lau (born 27 November 1960) is a Nigerian Politician who has served as the senator representing the Taraba North senatorial district since 2017. He is a member of the Peoples Democratic Party (PDP).

== Early life and education ==
Shuaibu Isa Lau was born in Lau in present-day Taraba State on 27 November 1960 into the family of Alhaji Isa Ali and Hajji Zainab Isa Ali. He started his educational journey at Local Education Authority Primary School Lau, from 1969 and 1975 and then General Murtala Muhammed College, Yola for his Ordinary Level School Certificate between 1975 and 1980. Thereafter, he proceeded to the School of Basic Studies, Ahmadu Bello University, Zaria in 1980, and later to the faculty of Engineering where he obtained a bachelor's degree in Engineering in 1984.

== Political career ==
In 2015, Lau joined politics by contesting for the Taraba North senatorial seat under the platform of the Peoples Democratic Party but Abubakar Sani Danladi maneuvered for the seat and was declared winner. He later sought redress in the court and won on 23 June 2017 to become a member of 8th assembly in the Senate until June 2019.

He was re-elected under the same political party, Peoples Democratic Party on 28 March 2019 where he polled 113, 580 votes to defeat his closest rival, Ahmed Yusuf (Gamaliya) of the All Progressives Congress who scored 111,412 votes to represent Taraba North for another four years. He was the Chairman of Senate Committee on Public Procurement at the 9th National Assembly of the Nigerian Senate. He was re-elected senator in 2023.

== Personal life ==
Lau is married to Hajia Fati Ibrahim Hassan Lau and blessed with children.
