= Karim Lamido =

- LGA and town
- Interactive map of Karim Lamido
- Location in Nigeria
- Coordinates: 9°12′N 10°53′E
- Country: Nigeria
- State: Taraba State

Government
  - Local Government Chairman and the Head of the Local Government Council: Hon. Bitrus Danjos

Area
  - Total: 6,620 km^{2} (2,560 sq mi)

Population (2006 census)
  - Total: 195,844
  - Density: 29.6/km^{2} (76.6/sq mi)
- Time zone: UTC+1 (WAT)
- 3-digit postal code prefix: 662
- ISO 3166 code: NG.TA.KL

Karim Lamido is a town and Local Government Area in Taraba State, Nigeria.

It has an area of 6,620 km^{2} and a population of 195,844 at the 2006 census.

The southern border of Karim Lamido is the Benue River, and it is traversed by several tributaries of that river.

The postal code of the area is 662.

Karim Lamido has various ethnic groups, including Karimjo, Jenjo, Bambuka, Munga Lelau, Munga Dosso, Kodei, Dadiya, Bandawa, Wurkun, and Fulani.

It contains about 11 political wards, some of which are Karim 'A', Karim 'B', Bikwin, Amar, Andamin, Jen Ardido, Jen Kaigama, Kwanchi, Didango, Darofai, Bachama, etc.

== Climate ==
Karim Lamido has 154.58 wet days (42.35% of the time) annually and averages 31.83 °C (89.29 °F), which is 2.37% warmer than the national average for Nigeria.

== Settlements ==
Karim Lamido Local Government Area (LGA) in Taraba State, Nigeria, consists of numerous towns, villages, and smaller rural settlements distributed across a predominantly agrarian landscape. Community listings and administrative directories identify a mix of larger population centres and dispersed villages connected mainly by local access routes rather than major highways.

=== Villages and rural settlements ===
Among the rural communities within Karim Lamido LGA are the following:

- Materum – A village listed among the populated places within Karim Lamido LGA, forming part of a cluster of nearby rural settlements.
- Mutuke – A small rural settlement located near Materum and Darfai. It is part of the dispersed settlement pattern characteristic of the area and is connected to neighbouring villages by local earth roads and footpaths.
- Darfai (also rendered as Darofo or Darofoi) – A nearby village within the same rural cluster as Mutuke and Materum.
- Balasa
- Banyam
- Didango

These settlements reflect the largely rural habitation pattern of Karim Lamido LGA, where communities are typically small and separated by farmland and open savanna. Livelihoods are predominantly based on subsistence agriculture and local trading activities.

=== Transportation and road network ===
Transportation within Karim Lamido LGA relies mainly on a network of rural access roads linking villages such as Mutuke, Materum, and Darfai to the LGA headquarters and nearby market centres. These roads are largely unpaved and may become difficult to navigate during the rainy season, affecting mobility and the transport of agricultural produce.

== See also ==
- Materum, Nigeria
- Muri, Nigeria
- Karimjo, Nigeria
