= Yusuf Abubakar Yusuf =

Nigerian politician (born 1956)

Senator for Taraba Central
- In office 26 November 2015 – 11 June 2023 Serving with Shuaibu Isa Lau; Emmanuel Bwacha
- Preceded by: Bashir Marafa Abba
- Succeeded by: Haruna Manu

Personal details
- Born: 5 November 1956 (age 69) Nguroje, Northern Region, British Nigeria (now in Taraba State, Nigeria)
- Party: All Progressives Congress
- Education: Ahmadu Bello University; University of East Anglia
- Occupation: Politician

Yusuf Abubakar Yusuf (born 5 November 1956) is a Nigerian politician who served as the senator representing the Taraba Central senatorial district from 2015 to 2023.

Yusuf contested for the Taraba Central senatorial district seat in the 2015 Nigerian Senate elections on the platform of the APC. He was defeated by the PDP candidate Bashir Marafa Abba. He filled a case in the election tribunal and was declared winner on 26 November 2015, after the election tribunal, and an Appeal Court sacked Marafa Abba.

== Early life and education ==
Born in Nguroje, he schooled at Ahmadu Bello University (BSc Economics, 1980) and the University of East Anglia (MA Economics, 1983). He was a faculty member at the University of Maiduguri.

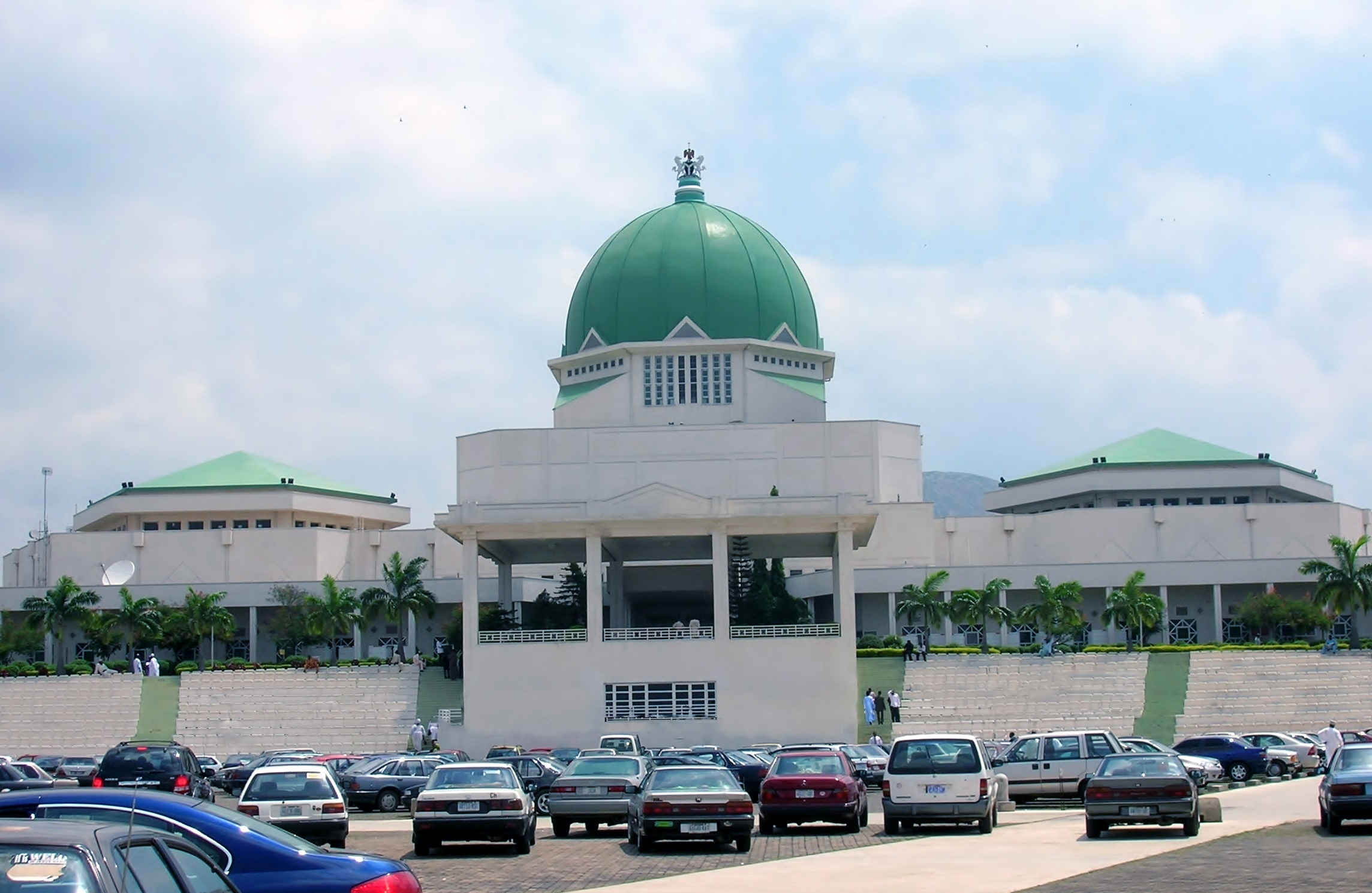
National Assembly in Abuja
