= Donga, Nigeria =

Donga Donzonga
- Town and LGA
- Interactive map of Donga
- Coordinates: 7°33′N 10°17′E
- Country: Nigeria
- State: Taraba State
- Headquarters: Donga

Area
  - Total: 3,121 km^{2} (1,205 sq mi)

Population (2006 census)
  - Total: 134,111
  - Density: 42.97/km^{2} (111.3/sq mi)
- Time zone: UTC+1 (WAT)
- 3-digit postal code prefix: 671
- ISO 3166 code: NG.TA.DO

Donga is a town and Local Government Area on the Donga River in Taraba State, Nigeria. It was officially created as a LGA in 1991.

== Geography ==
Donga has an area of 3,121 km^{2} and also serves as the home of the Donga river which flows through the LGA. The average temperature of Donga is around 32 °C (90 °F) while the humidity level of the LGA is an average of 17 percent.

=== Climate ===
The hottest and coldest months of Donga are March and December, respectively, with average high temperatures of under 29 °C (85 °F) and low temperatures of under 18 °C (65 °F). The hot season, which runs from February 5 to April 14, lasts for 2.3 months and with daily highs that average more than 33 °C (91 °F). March is the hottest month in Donga with an average high temperature of 34 °C (93 °F) and low temperature of 23 °C (74 °F). The average daily maximum temperature during the 3.5-month cool season, which runs from June 24 to October 9, is below 29 °C (85 °F). December is the coldest month of the year in Donga, with an average high temperature of 30 °C (86 °F) and low of 18 °C (65 °F).

== Population ==
Donga has approximately 177,900 population with the conglomeration of different tribes such as the Tiv, Chamba, the Ichen, the Hausa and the Fulani.

== Religion ==
The most widely practiced religions in Donga are Christianity and Islam with a minority of Traditional Indigenous beliefs.

== Occupation ==
The occupation of most of the inhabitants are farming, hunting, fishing, cattle rearing and trading.

== History ==
The history of Donga is a rich narrative of migration, warfare, and state-building, primarily centered on the Chamba Leko people and their establishment of a centralized kingdom in the Benue Valley.

=== Origins and migration ===
The Chamba people (the primary ethnic group of Donga) trace their distant origins to the East, with some oral traditions even pointing toward the Middle East (Sham/Syria). The Long Trek: Their ancestors migrated through Chad and Borno before settling in the Benue Valley. The Fulani Conflict: By the early 19th century, the Chamba were living in parts of present-day Cameroon. However, following attacks and the killing of their chiefs by Fulani jihadists, they were forced to migrate further into what is now Nigeria.

=== The founding of Donga (c. 1830) ===
The modern settlement of Donga was established around 1830. It was founded by Nubunga Dozinga, a prominent Chamba leader who led his people to the fertile plains near the Donga River. The site was chosen for its agricultural potential and the natural defense provided by the river and surrounding mountains, at the time the kwararrafa Kingdom was fragmented.

=== The "Gara" Monarchy ===
Donga is unique for its centralized political system. Unlike some neighboring decentralized groups, the Chamba established a powerful monarchy. The paramount ruler holds the title Gara Donga. One of the most famous rulers was Malam Muhamman Bitemya Sambo (Garbosa II), who reigned from 1931 to 1982. He was a scholar-king who spent 30 years documenting the history of the Chamba people in his book, Labarun Chambawa da Al'Amurransu (1956), which remains a primary source for the region's history.

=== Defense and Infrastructure ===
To protect the growing kingdom from the frequent slave raids and inter-tribal wars of the 19th century, the leaders built significant fortifications. During the reign of Garkiye I, massive city walls and gates were constructed. While most are in ruins today, their remains are still recognized as significant historical landmarks and potential tourism sites.

=== Colonial and Modern Era ===
During the british colonial period, Donga was part of the Muri Division. The British largely maintained the traditional Gara system but integrated it into their "Indirect Rule" administrative structure. Donga became a Local Government Area (LGA) in September 1991 following the creation of Taraba State from the former Gongola State. Today, Donga stands as a testament to Chamba resilience, maintaining its traditional customs and monarchical system while serving as a hub for the cocoa trade and agriculture in Taraba.

== Ethnicity ==
There are distinct ethnic groups with different languages and origins, though they have lived as neighbors for centuries and have a complex, shared history in the Benue Valley. The presence of the Tiv, Ichen, and Jukun in Donga and the surrounding areas is a result of different migration waves spanning hundreds of years.

=== The Jukun (the ancient power) ===
The Jukun are far older residents of the region than the Chamba. The Jukun are the descendants of the Kwararafa Empire, a powerful confederation that dominated central Nigeria from the 14th to the 18th century. They moved from the Lake Chad Basin into the Benue Valley long ago. After their capital at Kororofa was sacked by Fulani Jihadists in the 18th century, they shifted their center to Wukari (near Donga) around 1840. While the Chamba later established the Donga monarchy, the Jukun remained the spiritual and political powerhouse of the wider region under their paramount ruler, the Aku Uka of Wukari.

=== The Ichen (the aboriginal inhabitants) ===
The Ichen are often considered the indigenous or "aboriginal" people of Donga before the Chamba arrived. They are part of the larger Jukunoid language family and trace their roots to the Kwararafa Empire. The Ichen were already settled in the Donga area (which they called Etkyé) when the Chamba arrived in the 1830s. In 1845, the Chamba, who were better organized militarily at the time, moved into Donga and imposed their own ruler (the Gara) over the Ichen. Today, the Ichen remain a major population in Donga, maintaining their distinct clans and cultural identity.

=== The Tiv (the agricultural migrants) ===
The Tiv arrived in the Taraba region through a different path, primarily from the south and west. The Tiv migrated from the Congo basin through the Cameroon mountains, eventually settling in the fertile Benue Valley between 1750 and 1800. Because the Tiv are traditionally highly skilled farmers, they moved into the Donga and Wukari plains in search of fertile land for yams and grains. Unlike the Chamba and Jukun, who built centralized kingdoms, the Tiv historically lived in decentralized, egalitarian kinship groups.

=== Why are the Chamba in charge of Donga? ===
The Chamba are "latecomers" compared to the Jukun and Ichen, but they were a "warrior" group. When the Chamba were pushed out of their original homes in Cameroon by Fulani expansion, they migrated as a highly disciplined military force. When they arrived in the Donga area, they were able to provide protection against Fulani raids. In exchange for this protection (or through direct conquest), they established the Donga Emirate/Kingdom, placing a Chamba King (Gara) at the head of a multi-ethnic society that included the Ichen and Jukun who were already there.

=== Ancient walls ===
During the reign of Garkiye I, massive city walls and gates were constructed. While most are in ruins today, their remains are still recognized as significant historical landmarks and potential tourism sites.

== Postal Code ==
The postal code of the area is 671.

== Notable people ==
- Bitrus Gani-Ikilama
