= Zing, Taraba State =

Zing
- LGA and town
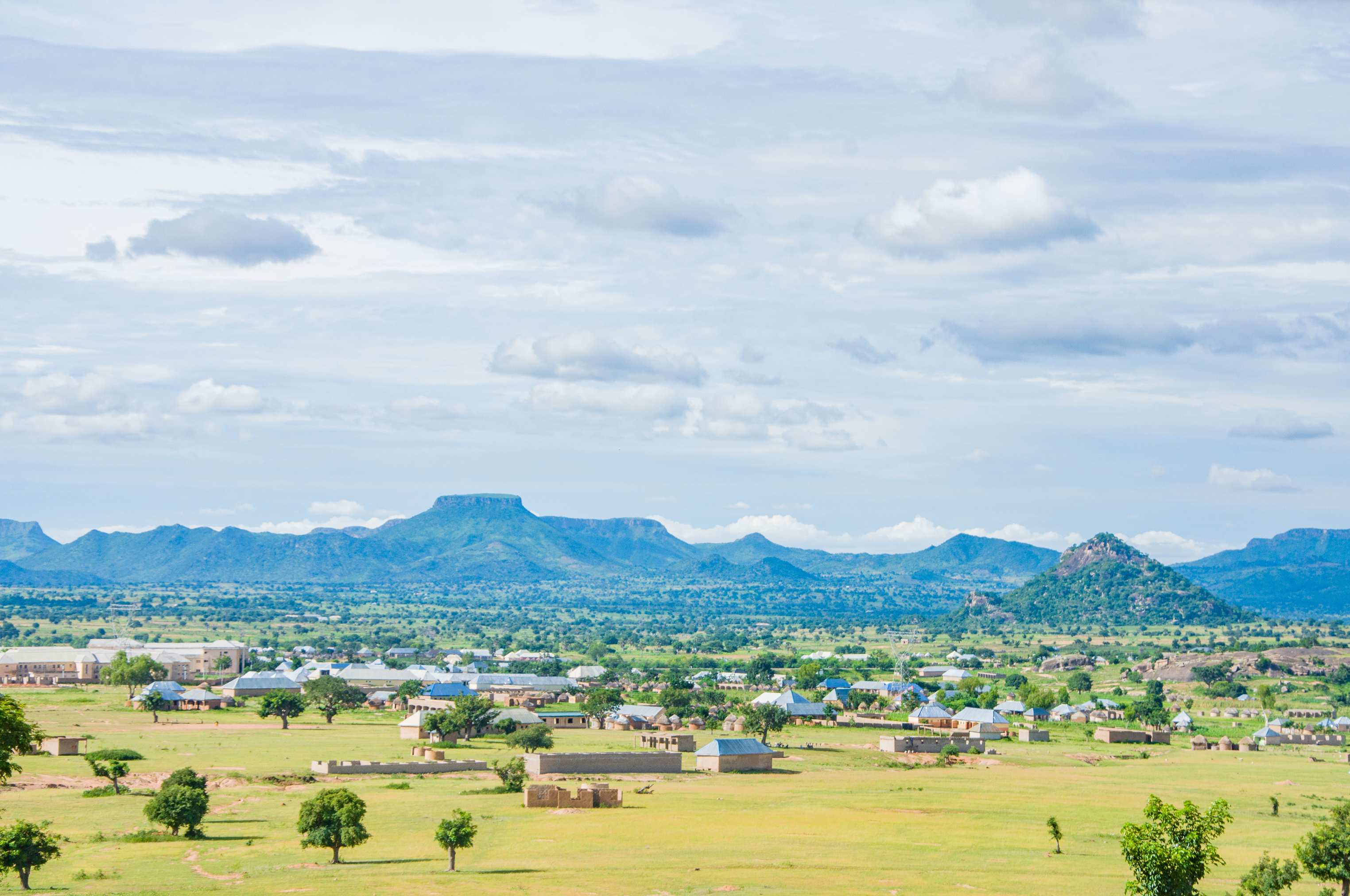
- Interactive map of Zing
- Location within Nigeria
- Coordinates: 9°N 11.7°E
- Country: Nigeria
- State: Taraba State

Government
  - Local Government Chairman and the Head of the Local Government Council: Hon. Davoro K

Area
  - Total: 1,030 km^{2} (400 sq mi)

Population (2006)
  - Total: 127,363
  - Density: 124/km^{2} (320/sq mi)
- Time zone: UTC+1 (WAT)

Zing is a town and Local Government Area in Taraba State, Nigeria. Zing is predominantly Mumuye, constituted by 12 clans.

There are 10 Wards in zing local government area namely: Bitako, Bubong, Dinding, Lamma, Monkin A, Monkin B, Yakoko, Zing A I, Zin A II, Zing B.

== Climate ==
The rainy season in Zing is warm, muggy, and humid, whereas the dry season is hot and partially cloudy. The average annual temperature typically fluctuates around 14–35 °C (58–95 °F); rarely it might stretch to 11 °C (51 °F) or 38 °C (101 °F). The hot season, which runs from February 8 to April 15, lasts for 2.2 months and with daily highs that average more than 33 °C (92 °F). March is the warmest month of the year, with temperatures ranging 21–35 °C (70–95 °F). The average daily high temperature during the 3.2-month cool season, which runs from June 28 to October 2, is below 28 °C (83 °F). December is the coldest month, with a temperature range of 15–30 °C (59–86 °F). The district has an annual temperature of 31.14 °C (88.05 °F), which is 1.68% higher than the Nigerian average. Rainy days average 151.25 (41.44% of the total) dropping 103.37 millimetres (4.07 inches) of precipitation. The average wind speed in the LGA is 10 km/h (6.2 mph).

=== Cloud cover ===
Skies clear around on October 26 and remain for 4.4 months, concluding approximately on March 7. January is the clearest month, with the sky being clear, mostly clear, or partly cloudy 52% of the time on average. Beginning about March 7 and lasting for 7.6 months, the cloudier season ends around October 26. May is the cloudiest month of the year, with the skyovercast or mostly cloudy 80% of the time.
