= Gassol =

- Town and LGA
- Interactive map of Gassol
- Location in Nigeria
- Coordinates: 8°24′N 10°32′E
- Country: Nigeria
- State: Taraba State
- Local Government Headquarters: Mutum Biyu (Mutumbiyu)

Government
  - Local Government Chairman and the Head of the Local Government Council: Hon. Abubakar Sadiq

Area
  - Total: 5,548 km^{2} (2,142 sq mi)

Population (2006 census)
  - Total: 244,749
  - Density: 44.11/km^{2} (114.3/sq mi)
- Time zone: UTC+1 (WAT)
- 3-digit postal code prefix: 620
- ISO 3166 code: NG.TA.GS

Gassol is a small town and a Local Government Area in Taraba State, Nigeria. Its headquarters are in the town of Mutum Biyu (or Mutumbiyu or Mutum Mbiyu) on the A4 highway at8°38′00″N 10°46′00″E.

It has an area of 5,543.9 km^{2} and a population of 310,003 in 2015 according to the European Commission's Joint Research Centre (JRC).

The postal code of the area is 672.

The northern border of Gassol is the Benue River and the Taraba River flows north through the area to its confluence with the Benue.

Gassol is one of the sixteen LGAs of Taraba State whose majority population is the Fulani, Wurkun, Tiv and Jukun people, it is regarded as the hub of agriculture in Taraba with fulani rearing great herds of cattle while the Tiv and Jukun cultivate much yam making Dan-Anacha to have the biggest yam market in Taraba State, Dan-Anacha yam market. Fishing activities are greatly carried out by the Jukun Wanu people in Tella, one of the major towns in the LGA. Due to ethnic conflicts, there have been attempts to rename Dan-Anacha to Kwararafa though rejected by some people who believe it could be intended to favour a specific ethnic group.

There are 12 Wards in GASSOL local government area namely: GASSOL, GUNDUMA, MUTUM BIYU I, MUTUM BIYU II, NAM NAI, SABON GIDA, SARKIN SHIRA, SENDIRDE, TUTARE, WUROJAM, WURYO, YARIMA

== Climate ==
The temperature in the wet season is overcast and partly cloudy, while the dry season is humid and mostly sunny, resulting in a hot year-round climate.

The climate of Gassol is classified as tropical wet and dry, or savanna (Aw). The district experiences an annual temperature of 32.72 °C (90.9 °F), which is 3.26% higher than the average for Nigeria. Gassol has 158.91 rainy days (43.54% of the time) and 108.6 millimetres (4.28 inches) of precipitation on average every year.
