= Bali, Nigeria =

Bali Bakundi Bakundi
- LGA and town
- Interactive map of Bali
- Location within Nigeria
- Country: Nigeria
- State: Taraba State
- Bakundi: 1860

Government
  - Local Government Chairman and the Head of the Local Government Council: HON.MICAH DANBABA DAKKA

Area
  - Total: 9,146 km^{2} (3,531 sq mi)
- Time zone: UTC+1 (WAT)
- Postal code: 672
- Climate: Aw

Bali is a town and Local Government Area in Taraba State, Nigeria.

The postal code of the area is 672.

== Climate/Geography ==
Bali LGA has a total area of 9,146 square kilometres or 3,531 square miles and has a tropical Savannah climate. It is estimated that the area has a 16 percent humidity level and an average temperature of 33 degrees Celsius (91.4 degrees Fahrenheit). The two distinct seasons in Bali Local Government Area are the rainy and dry seasons. The rainy season is the shorter of the two and is distinguished by light to moderate rainfall.

== Education ==
- Federal Polytechnic
