= Takum =

- LGA and town
- Nickname: TTM
- Motto: Together We are One
- Interactive map of Takum
- Coordinates: 7°15′N 9°59′E
- Country: Nigeria
- State: Taraba State

Government
  - Chairman: Hon. Bako Benjamin

Area
  - Total: 2,503 km^{2} (966 sq mi)

Population (2006 census)
  - Total: 135,349
  - Density: 54.07/km^{2} (140.1/sq mi)
- Time zone: UTC+1 (WAT)
- 3-digit postal code prefix: 671
- ISO 3166 code: NG.TA.TA

Takum is a town and Local Government Area of Taraba State, Nigeria. It was created out of Wukari local government in June 1976. Takum borders the Republic of Cameroon in the south, Ussa Local Government to the west, Donga Local Government to the north, District within Takum are Angwan Dutse, Angwa Abuja, Tikari, Fadama, Gahwetun, Akenten, Acha Nyim, Chanchanji (Peva), Sufa, Shimta, Kufi, Muji, Akenten, Lufu, Kashimbilla, Kpaasan, Likam, Bete, Malumshe, Jidu, Tampwa, Dumse, Nyayirim, Liji, Shibong Igbang, Barki Lissa, Acha Sarka, Sabon Gida Yukuben etc. Takum LGA is divided into eleven electoral wards namely: Bete, Chanchanji, Dutse, Fete, Gahweton, Kashimbila, Manya, Rogo, Shibong, Tikari, Yukuben

Major tribes are the Kuteb, Ichen, Kpanzon, Tiv, Chamba, Uhumkhigi and Hausa. Takum is under the Traditional leadership of The Ukwe of Takum Rimamnyang Habu Ahmadu II.

The postal code of the area is 671.

== Geography ==
Located adjacent to the montane borderland between Nigeria and Cameroon, Takum spans an area of 2,503 km^{2} with a population of 135,349 at the 2006 census. Its coordinates are: 7°16′00″N 9°59′00″E.

The Kuteb tribe is one of the fastest growing tribes in Nigeria with population of about 500,000 spread across Taraba State and other parts of Nigeria especially Southwest and South South. Other tribes found in Takum are Jukun (Kpanzo), Chamba, Ichen, Yukuben, Tiv, Hausa, Yoruba, Igbo, etc.

== Takum Culture and Leadership ==
=== The Ukwe of Takum ===
The Ukwe is the Supreme Head of the ruling families. This position is exclusively reserved for the Likam and Akenten ruling families. The Kutebs as the aborigines of Takum are governed by Ukwe (King) which history dates back to the Sixteenth Century. Some of the others tribes that later migrated to Takum e.g, Kpanzo, Chamba, Tiv, Yukuben, Hausa Had their own kings that oversaw their affairs, till 1914 when the then Colonial Government amalgamated the tribal rulerships in Takum into one Paramount Traditional Institution and upgraded it to a Third Class Stool. After a careful study of the history of the tribes in Takum, and upon realization that the Kutebs are the aborigines of Takum, the Colonial Government appointed Ukwe Ahmadu Gankwe (Kuteb) who then was a District Head as the first Ukwe Takum from 1914 below:

==== Rulers ====	Reign
Ukwe Likam Kuteb I	1510-1550
Ukwe Rucwu Acha I	1550-1600
Ukwe Kuteb Riyang II	1600-1645
Ukwe Ajunkwe Acebuy	1645-1695
Ukwe Andeburga Ricwu Acha	1695-1730
Ukwe Kingham Gankwe I	1730-1775
Ukwe Ganza Kwetsa	1775-1815
Ukwe Atirikwe	1815-1855
Ukwe Ayipte Gayara	1855-1890
Ukwe Ribon Ipop Gamina	1890-1912
Ukwe Ahmadu Gankwe	1912-1926
Ukwe Hassan A Gankwe	1926-1929
Ukwe Ibrahim Kufang	1929-1938
Ukwe Audu Gyaa Ahmadu Kufang II	1938-1963
Ukwe Ali Ibrahim	1963-1996
Ukwe Rimamnyang Habu Ahmadu II	2024- to Date

It is worth stating here that all these previous Ukwe Takum were selected and appointed in accordance with Kuteb Native Law and Custom which provides for only two ruling Kuteb Families of Likam and Akenten.

== Climate ==
Takum, a tropical wet and dry climate, has a yearly temperature of 31.41°C (88.54°F), which is 1.95% higher than Nigeria's norms.

== Languages ==
Takum is highly linguistically diverse, with more than a dozen distinct local languages (mostly Jukunoid languages and Southern Bantoid languages).

- Kuteb language
- Hausa
- Uhumkhigi Language
- Kpan language
- Acha Language
- Tiv language
