= Taraba State =

State of Nigeria

Taraba
- State
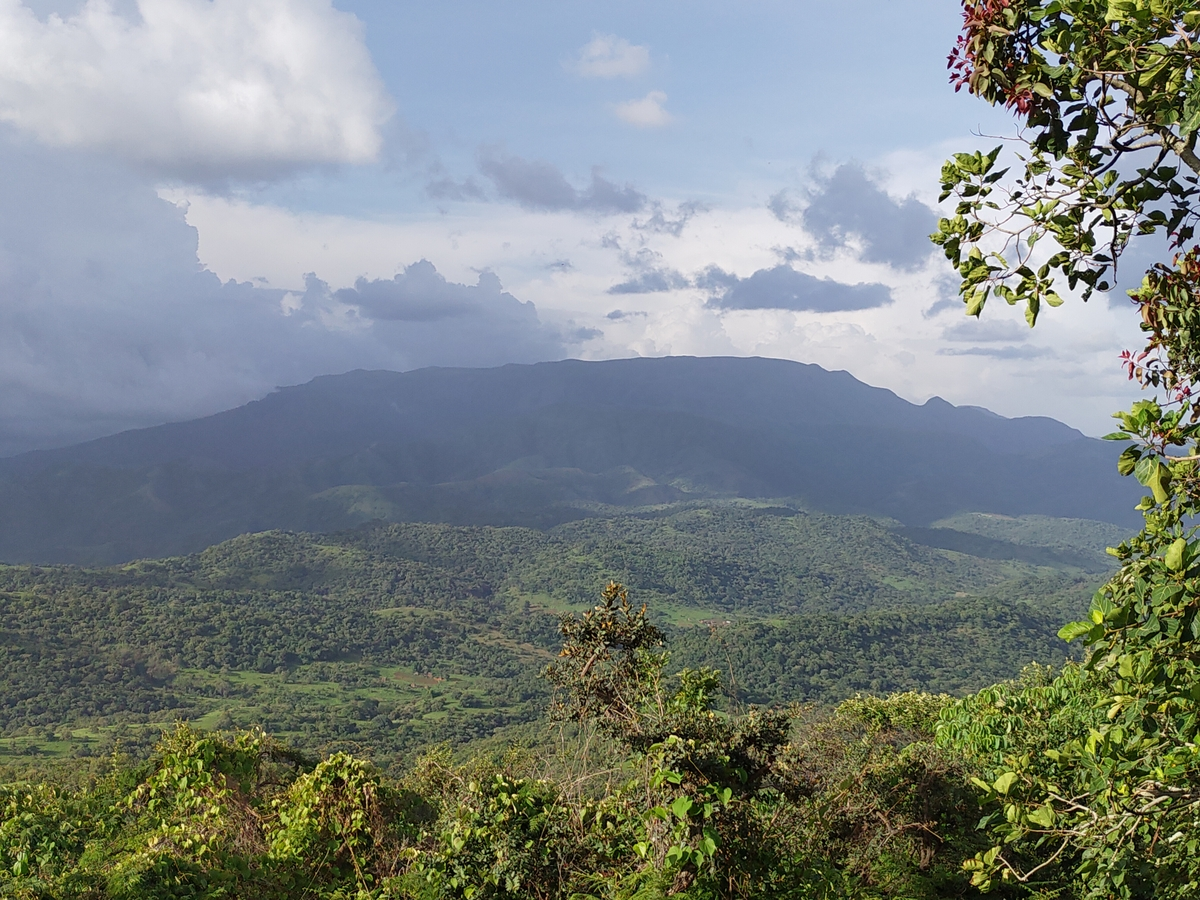
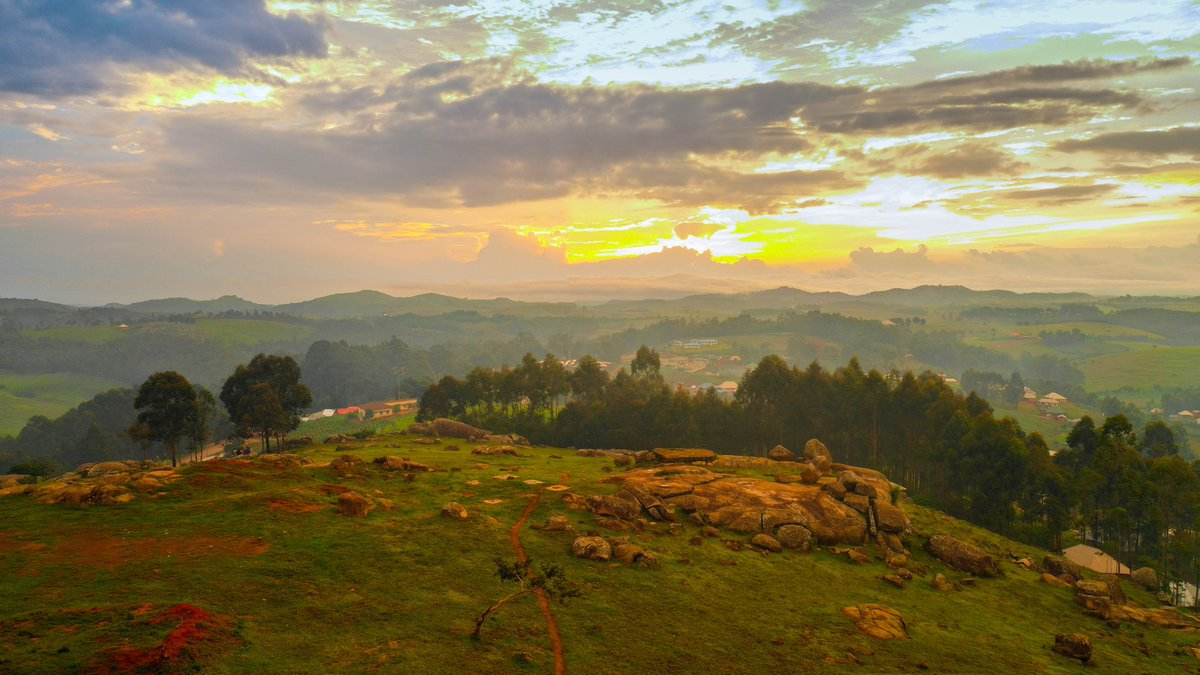
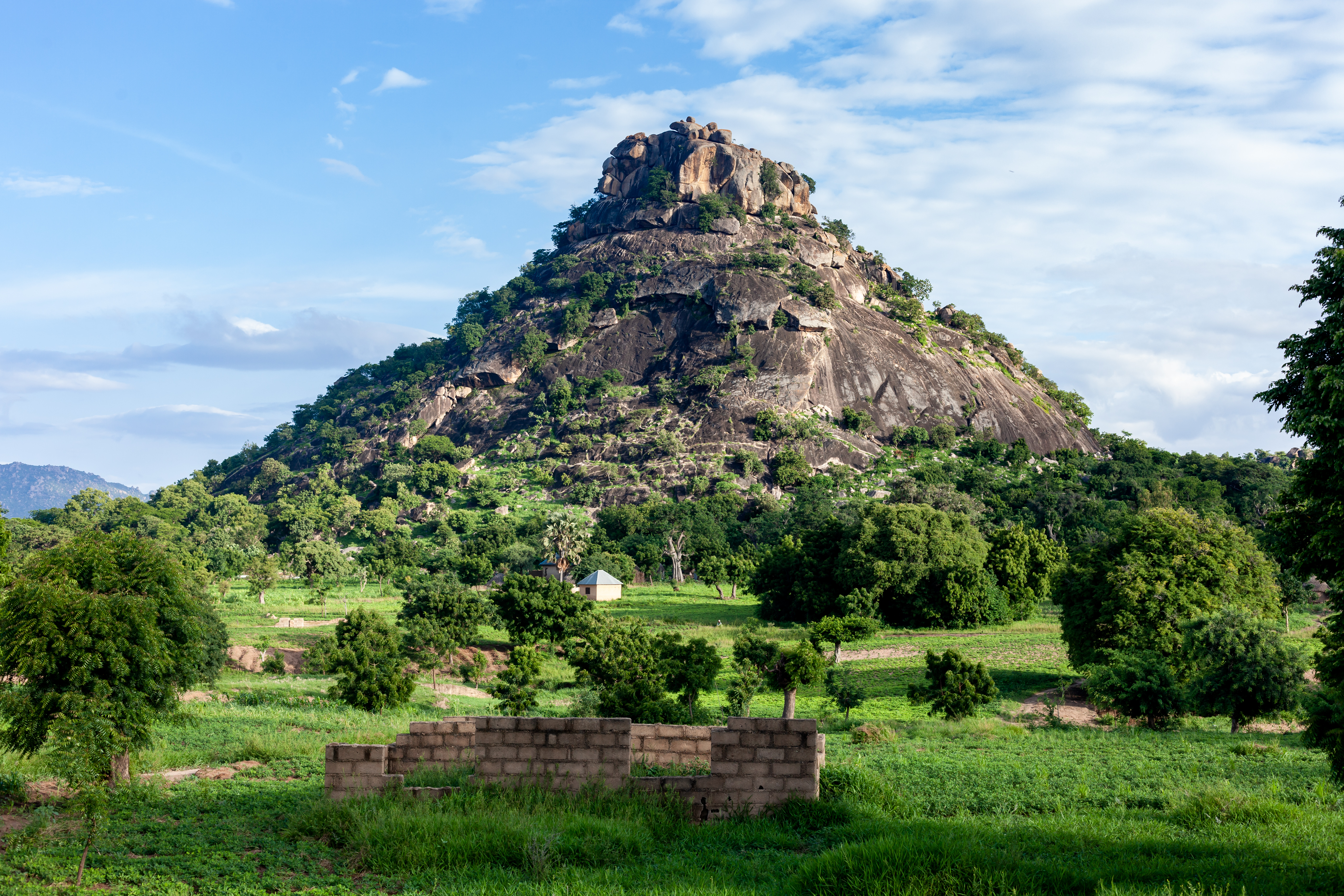
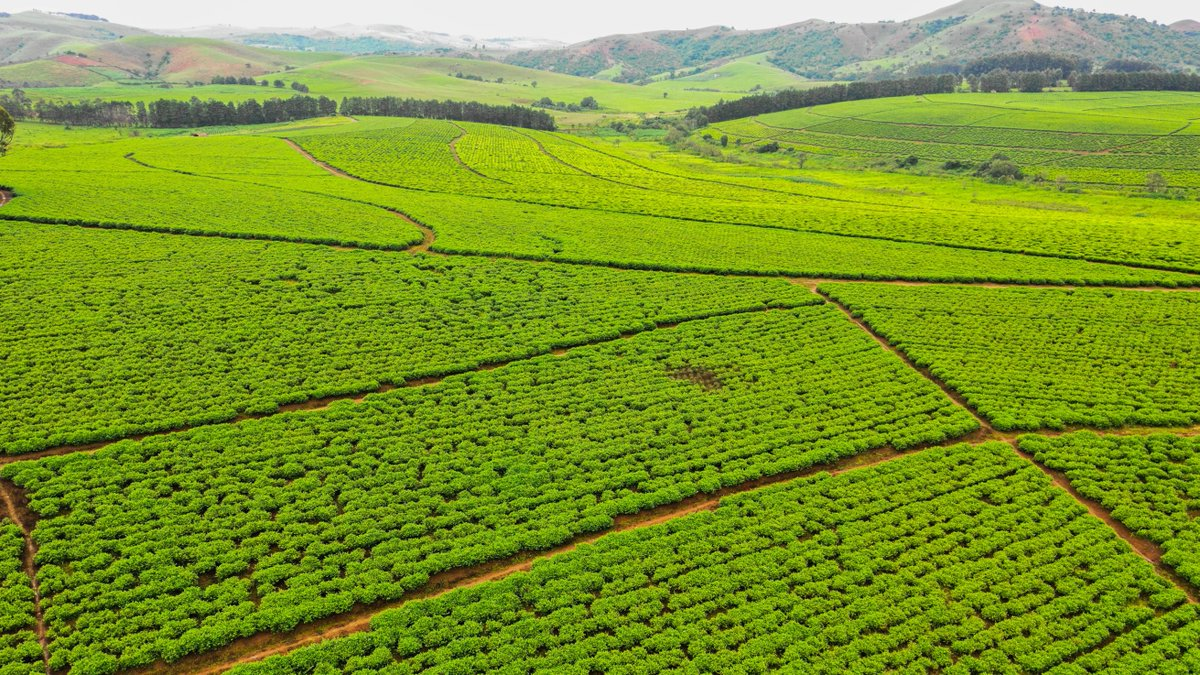
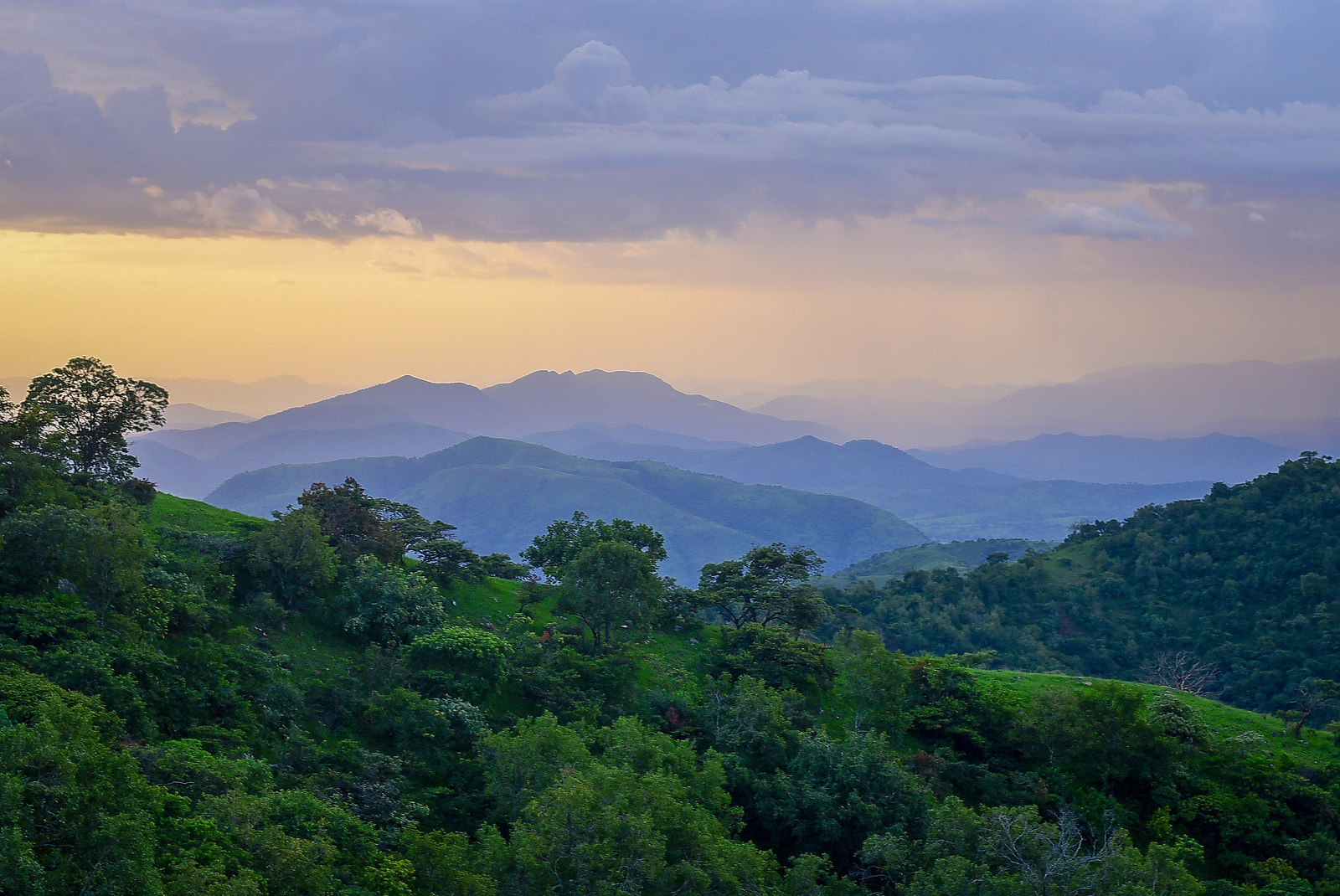
- Chappal Waddi Landscape of Gembu Zandi Hill Highland Tea Estate Gashaka Gumti National Park
- Nicknames: Nature's Gift to the Nation
- Location of Taraba State in Nigeria
- Coordinates: 8°00′N 10°30′E
- Country: Nigeria
- LGAs: 16
- Date created: 27 August 1991
- Capital: Jalingo

Government
  - Body: Government of Taraba State
  - Governor (List): Agbu Kefas (PDP)
  - Deputy Governor: Aminu Abdullahi Alkali (PDP)
  - Legislature: Taraba State House of Assembly
  - Senators: C: Haruna Manu (PDP); N: Shuaibu Isa Lau (PDP); S: David Jimkuta (APC)
  - Representatives: List

Area
  - Total: 54,473 km^{2} (21,032 sq mi)
  - Rank: 3rd of 36

Population (2006 census)
  - Total: 2,294,800
  - Estimate (2022): 3,609,800
  - Rank: 30th of 36
  - Density: 42.127/km^{2} (109.11/sq mi)

GDP (PPP)
  - Year: 2021
  - Total: $13.27 billion 28th of 36
  - Per capita: $3,720; 19th of 36
- Time zone: UTC+01 (WAT)
- postal code: 660001
- ISO 3166 code: NG-TA
- HDI (2022): 0.527 low · 26th of 37
- Website: tarabastate.gov.ng

Taraba is a state in north-eastern Nigeria, named after the Taraba River, which traverses the southern part of the state. It is nicknamed "Nature's Gift to the Nation". The state capital is Jalingo. It is home to a diverse population including about 80 distinct ethnicities and their languages.

== History ==
Taraba state was created out of the former Gongola state on 27 August 1991 by the military government of General Ibrahim Badamasi Babangida. The state is an amalgamation of three former divisions: Wukari, Mambilla, and Muri.

== Geography ==
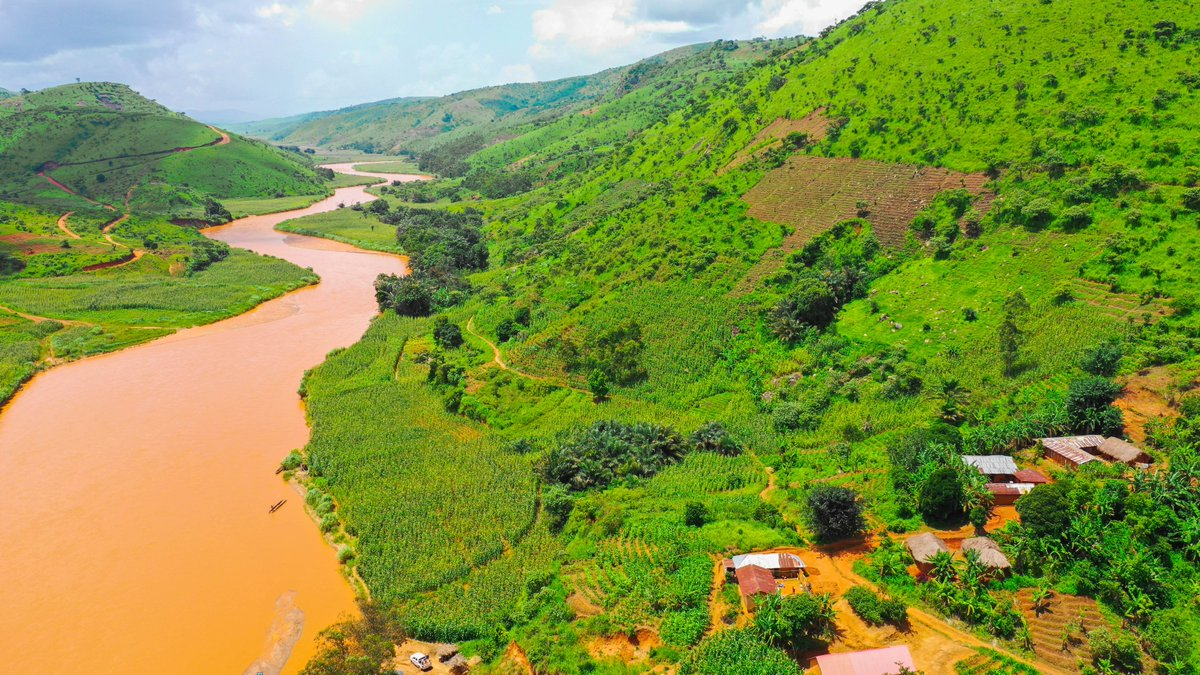
Donga River, Taraba state

Taraba state is bordered on the west by Nasarawa state and Benue state for 109 km, northwest by Plateau state for 202 km, north by the Bauchi state for 54 km and Gombe state for 58 km, northeast by Adamawa state for about 366 km and south by Northwest Region in Cameroon for about 525 km.

=== Rivers ===
The Benue, Donga, and Taraba are the main rivers in the state. They begin in the Cameroonian mountains, draining almost the entire length of the state on their way North, before heading west to link up with the Niger River.

== Climate ==
Taraba state has an annual average temperature of 33°C. It receives 100.64 millimetres (3.96 inches) of rainfall a year, with increased rainfall around August, and has an average relative humidity of 54.98%. The state is hottest in March and April with an average high of 40.44°C.

=== Flood ===
The State has been for years battling with recurrent floodings in some parts, costing a lot of lives, properties and economies. In April 2023, many homes and commercial buildings in Taraba State were affected by flooding. Another incident in April 2026 within the state capital Jalingo saw a widespread destruction, leaving homes and businesses stranded.

== Government ==
=== Local government areas ===
Taraba State consists of sixteen (16) Local Government Areas (LGAs), which are governed by elected chairmen. The local government areas are listed as follows: Ardo Kola, Bali, Donga, Gashaka, Gassol, Ibi, Jalingo, Karim Lamido, Kurmi, Lau, Sardauna, Takum, Ussa, Wukari, Yorro, and Zing

=== Politics ===
The state government is led by a democratically elected governor and the state's House of Assembly. The capital city of the state is Jalingo.

=== Electoral system ===
The governor of the state is selected using a modified two-round system. To be elected in the first round, a candidate must receive a plurality of votes and over 25% of votes in at least two-thirds of state and local government areas. If no candidate passes the threshold, a second round is held between the two candidates that received a plurality of votes in the most local government areas.

== Healthcare ==
Taraba State has several hospitals and health care centres, including:

- Courage Hospital
- Federal Medical Centre (FMC)
- Gateway Hospital
- General Hospital, Bali
- Sauki Hospital and Maternity
- Totus Hospital and Maternity
- Albert Healthcare Company
- Federal University Teaching Hospital wukari
- Taraba Specialist Hospital
- Kwararafa Hospital and Maternity
- Federal Polytechnic Bali Medical Centre
- First Referral Hospital
- Biyama Hospital

== Languages ==
Languages of Taraba state, listed by LGA, include:

LGA	Languages
Ardo Kola	Fulfulde; Mumuye, Jibu (Jukun Kona), and Hausa
Bali	Fulfulde; Ichen Language Fam; Gbaya, Northwest; Jibu; Jukun Takum; Kam; Mumuye; Ndoola; Chamba Dakka; chamba leko; Tiv; Hausa.
Donga	Ichen Language, Ekpan, Chamba Leko, Tiv.
Gashaka	Fulfulde, Jibu, Ndola, Chamba Daka; Yamba, Tiv and Hausa.
Gassol	Fulfulde, Wapan, Tiv
Ibi	Fulfulde Duguri; Dza, Tiv, Wanu
Jalingo	Fulfulde; Mumuye; Jibu (Jukun Kona), and Hausa
Karim Lamido	Fulfulde; Dadiya; Dza; Jiba;Sho (bandawa); Jiru; kodei; Kulung; Kyak; Laka; Munga Lelau; Loo; Mághdì; Mak; Munga Doso; Mumuye; Nyam; Pangseng; Wurkun-Anphandi; Shoo-Minda-Nye; Yandang; Hõne; Kwa; Pero. Hausa, Bambuka, Jenjo, Karimjo, Gomu, Panya.
Kurmi	Ndoro; Ichen language; Tigun language; Abon; Bitare; Tiv.
Lau	Kunini; Fufulde; Dza; Loo; Yandang, Laka and Hausa.
Sardauna	Mambila; Kaka; Banso; Kambu; Fulfulde; Tiv.
Takum	Mashi; Bete; Ichen Language, Chamba Daka; Jukun Takum; Kapya; Kpan; Kpati; Kuteb; Lufu; Acha language Acha; Tiv; Yukuben
Ussa	Kuteb
Wukari	Wapan, Ichen Language; Ekpan; Kpati; Kulung; Tarok; Tiv;
Yorro	Fulfulde; Mumuye, Hausa
Zing	Mumuye, Nyong; Rang; Yandang

Other languages spoken in Taraba State are Akum, Bukwen, Esimbi, Fali of Baissa, Jiba, Njerep, Tha, Yandang, Yotti, Ywom.

== Demographics ==
The state's primary ethnic groups are the Jukun, Jenjo, Fulani, Mumuye, Mambilla, Kuteb, Karimjo Wurkun, Tiv, Yandang, Ndola, Ichen, Tigon, and Jibu. The northern part of the state is mostly Fulani, Mumuye, and Sho. The southern part of the state is primarily Jukun, Wurkum, Tiv, Chamba, Kuteb, and Ichen. The central region is mainly occupied by the Fulani, Mambilla, Ndola, Tigon, Jibu, Wurbo, and Daka people.

== Education ==
Taraba State has many schools and education centres. Universities, Polytechnics and Colleges include:

- Federal Polytechnic, Bali
- Federal University, Wukari
- Kwararafa University, Wukari
- Taraba State University
- College of Education Zing
- Taraba State College of Health Technology, Takum
- Taraba State Polytechnic, Suntai
- Greeland University, Jalingo

== Transportation ==
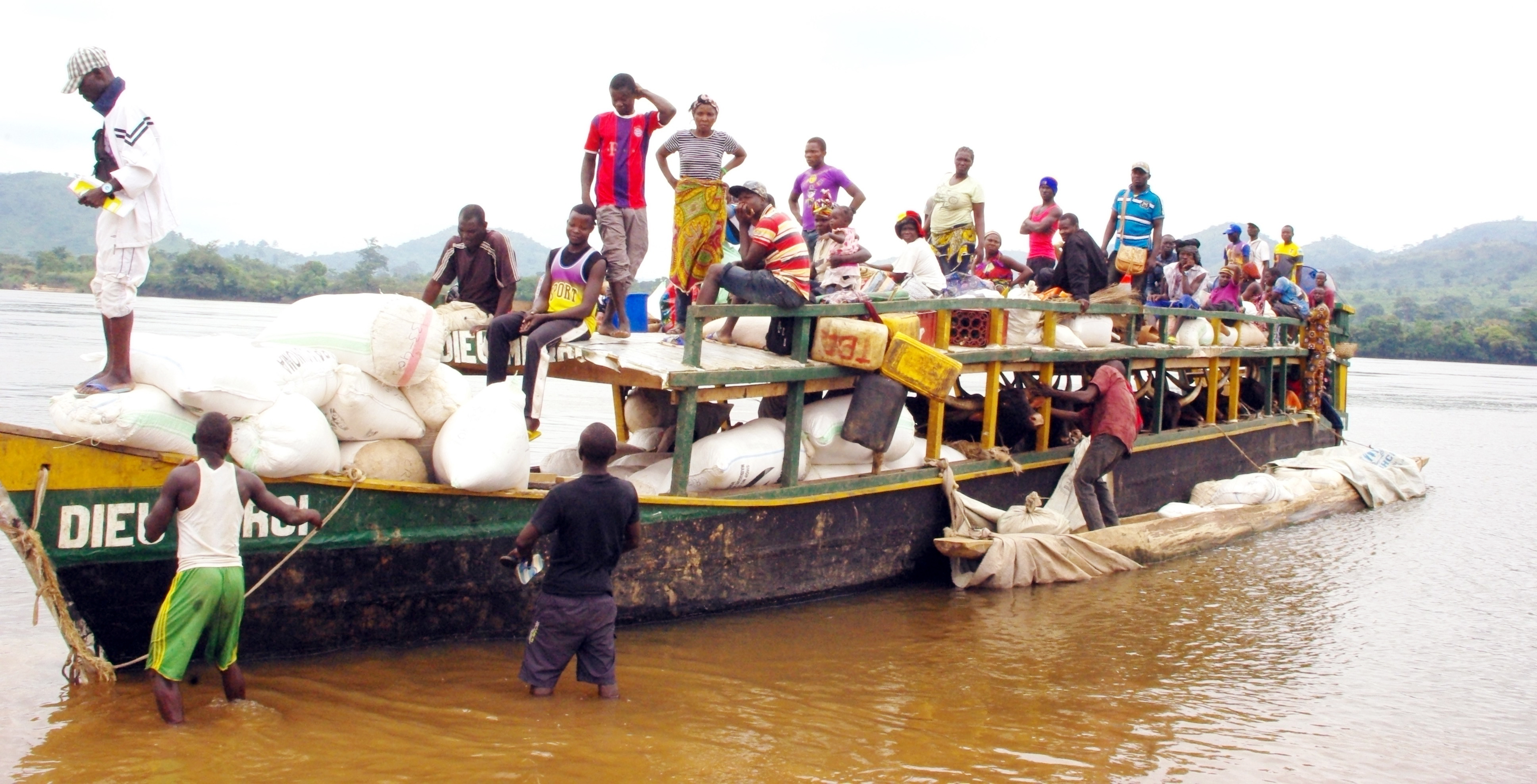
Transportation on the Lamido river

=== Federal highways ===
- A4, north from Benue State for 292 km, near Kado as the Wukari-Murtum Biyu Rd, across the Taraba River at Tella and Jalingo, to Adamawa State at Mayo Lane.
- A8, south from Burtol for 166 km to Gembu, unconnected to the A8 Highway in Adamawa State. Notably, there is a road to Cameroon east from A8 at Gembu to N6 at Banyo.

=== Major roadways ===
- The Bachumbi Rd, east from Plateau State at Zurak via Muri, Banyam and Bambuka to Adamawa State
- The Wukari-Ampei Rd, north to Ibi on the Benue River
- The Garin Kunini-Zing Rd, southeast from Dzhu'a-Khore via Pupule, to Adamawa State at Bisa as the Zaridi-Mayo Belwa Rd
- The Wukari-Takum Rd, south from Jalingo via Sunkani, Garbe Shede, Bajabure, Pangri and Mai Fula to Dogari Tiv
- The Katsina Ala-Takum road, west to Benue State at Dogon Gawa
- The Garin Jatau Bali Rd, east from Takum across the River Donga at Manya and northeast to Mararaba
- The Rafin Kada-Gembu Rd, southeast from Donga via Mararaba
- The Mambila-Plateau Rd

=== Airports ===
- Jalingo Airport

== Economy ==
=== Agriculture ===
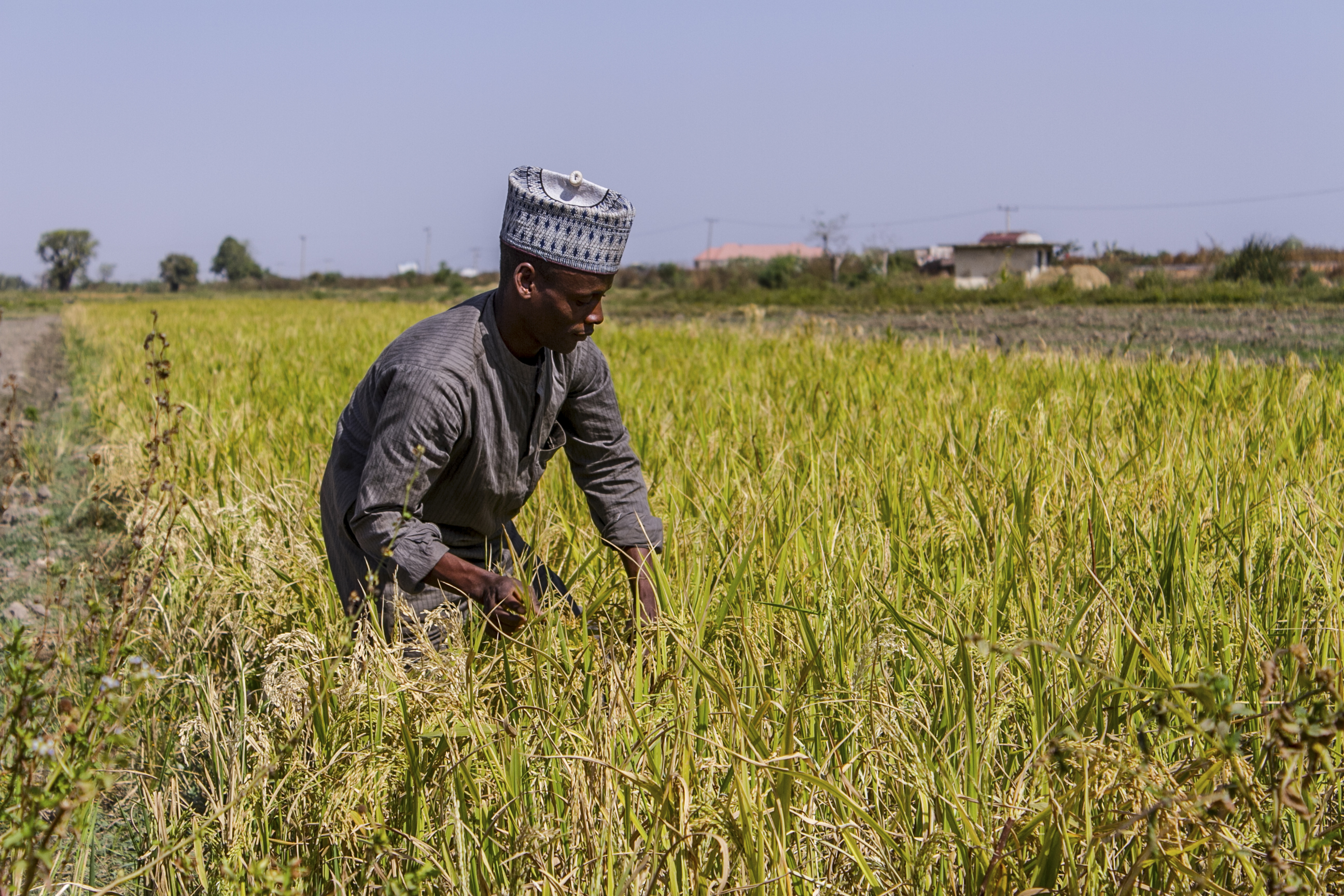
A man weeding rice crops in Taraba State

The major occupation of the people of Taraba state is agriculture. Cash crops produced in the state include coffee, tea, groundnuts and cotton. Crops such as maize, rice, sorghum, millet, cassava, and yam are also produced in commercial quantity. In addition, cattle, sheep and goats are reared in large numbers, especially on the Mambilla Plateau and along the Benue and Taraba valleys. Similarly, the people of Taraba state undertake other livestock production, such as poultry production, rabbit breeding and pig farming in fairly large scale. In February 2024, the World Bank in Nigeria announced plans to empower 5,200 female livestock farmers in the state. Communities living on the banks of the Benue River, Taraba River, and Donga River engage in fishing all year round. Other occupational activities such as pottery, cloth-weaving, dyeing, mat-making, carving, embroidery, and blacksmithing are carried out in various parts of the state.

=== Natural resources ===
Taraba state has abundant natural resources for industrial and commercial use, including:

==== Mineral raw materials ====
- Barytes
- Bauxites
- Graphite
- Limestone
- Gypsum
- Kaoline
- Feldspar
- Mica
- Pyrite
- Uranium
- Gemstone

==== Agro-raw materials ====
- Maize
- Millet
- Sorghum
- Rice
- Groundnut
- Cassava
- Fish
- Gum Arabic
- Cotton
- Timber
- Palm oil
- Cocoa
- Citrus
- Sugarcane
- Soy Beans
- Yam
- Egusi

== Culture ==
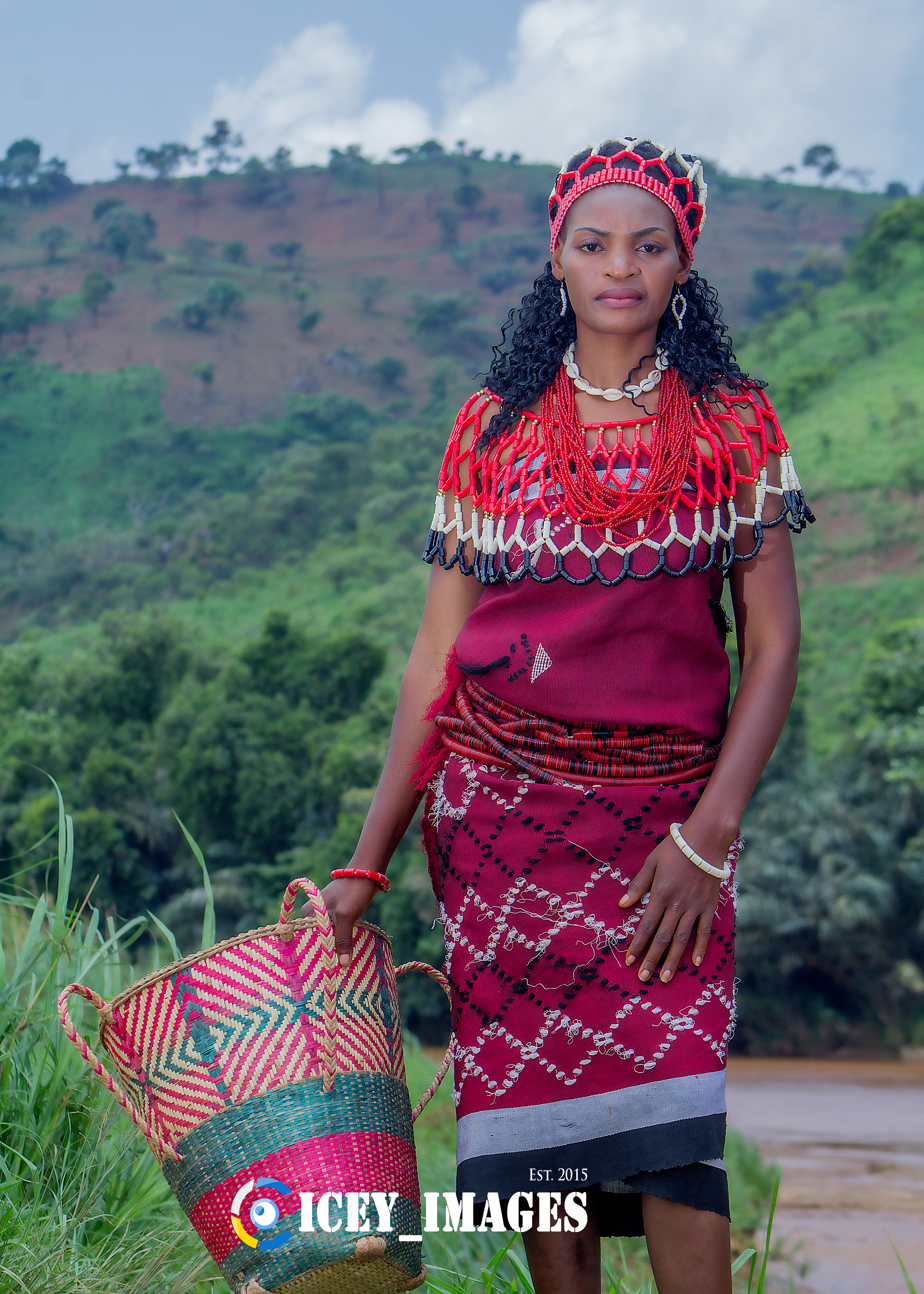
Mambilla woman in Taraba State

The state government has made improvements to tourist attractions, such as the Mambilla Tourist Center, and Gumpti Park and game reserve in Gashaka. The Karimjo Abedahh festival and Nwunyu fishing festival in Ibi are usually held in April each year, with activities such as canoe racing, a swimming competition, and cultural dances. Other festivals are the Purma of the Chamba in Donga, Takum and Jibu culture dance in Bali, Tagba of Acha People in Takum, Kuchecheb of Kutebs in Takum and Ussa, Kati and Bol of the Mambilla, and a host of others.

The State encompasses part of the Mambilla Region, which is the Bantu cradle, and area occupied for approximately five millennia to date.

== Gallery ==
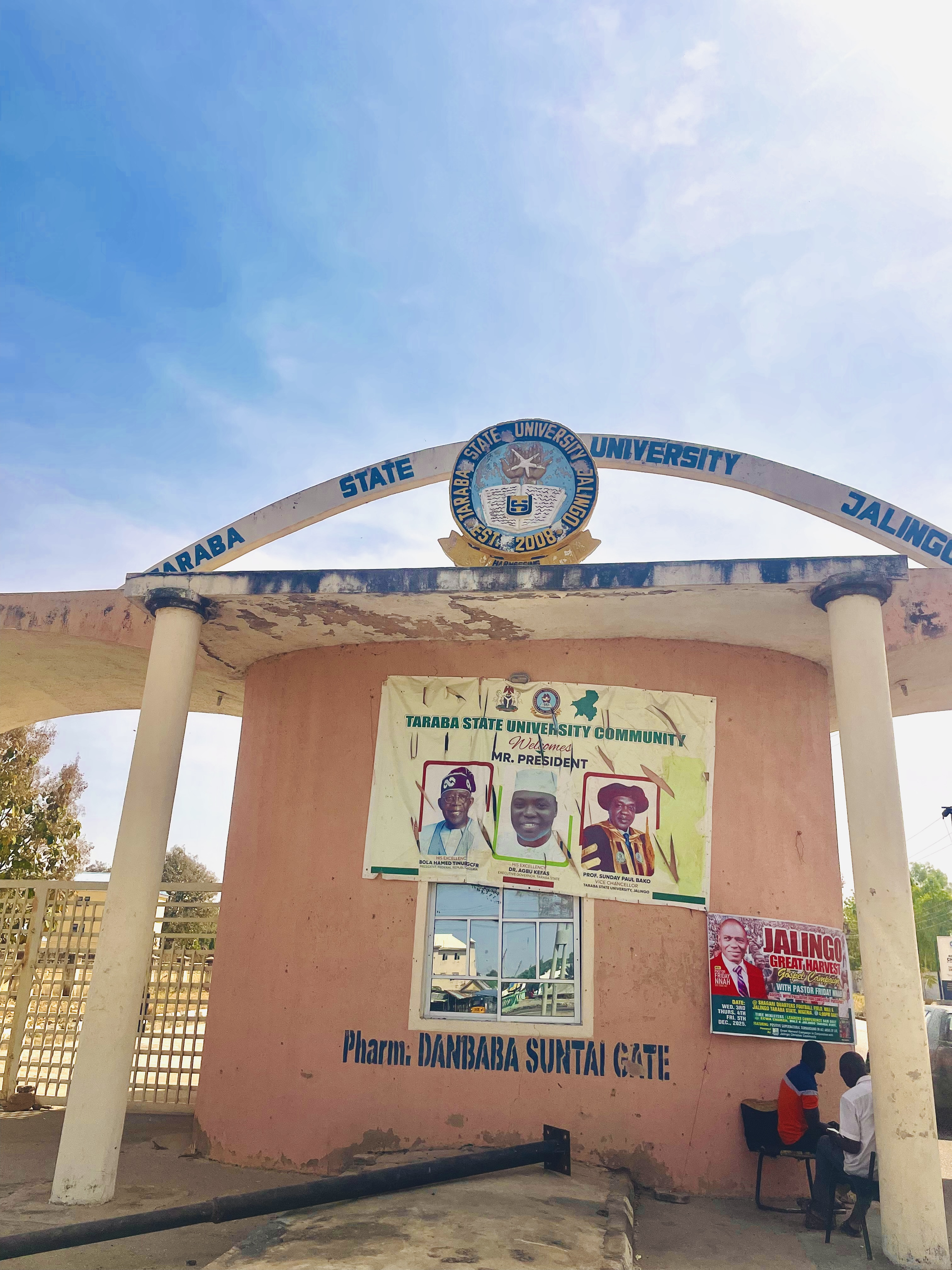
Entrance of Taraba State University

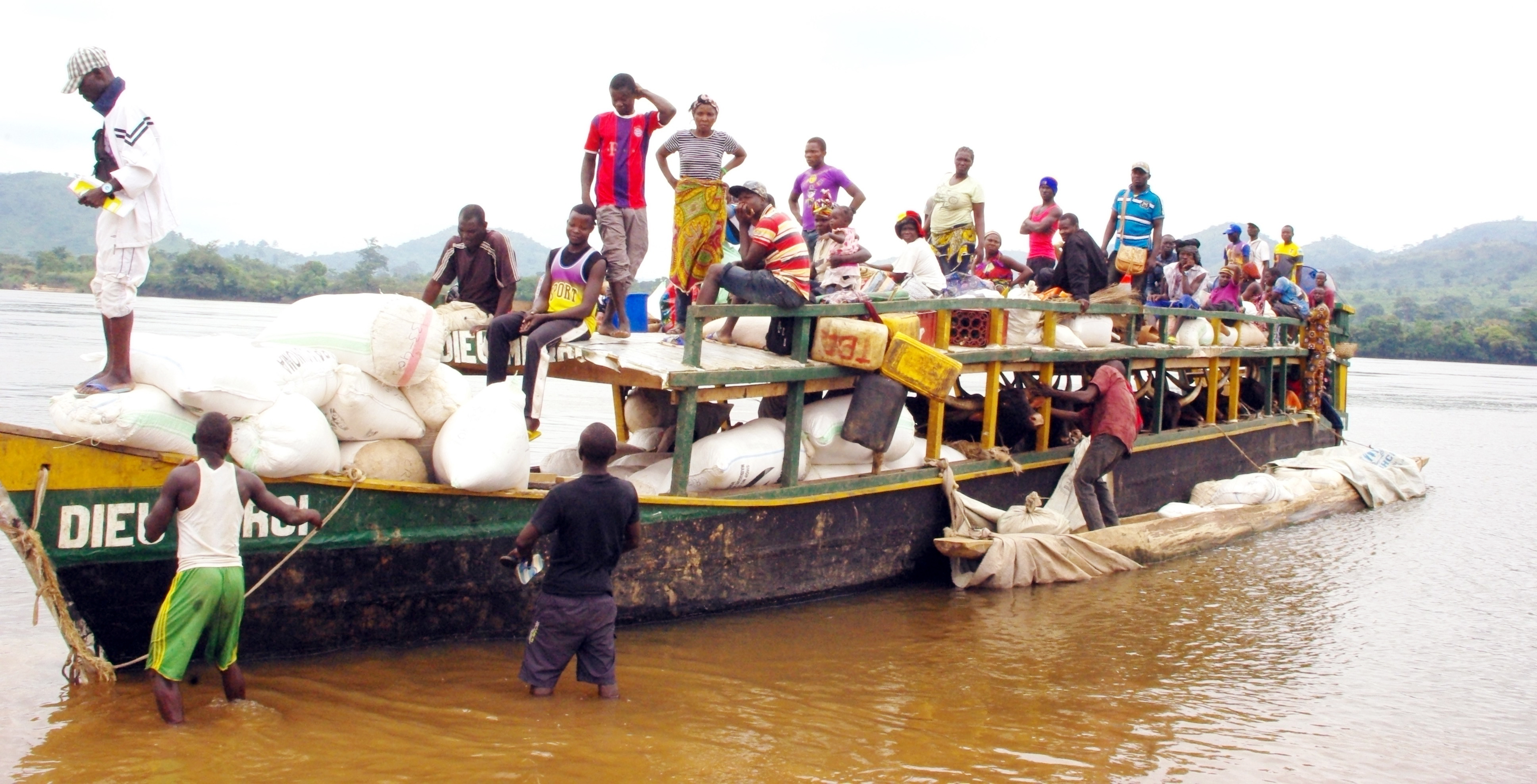
Transportation In river Lamido, Taraba State

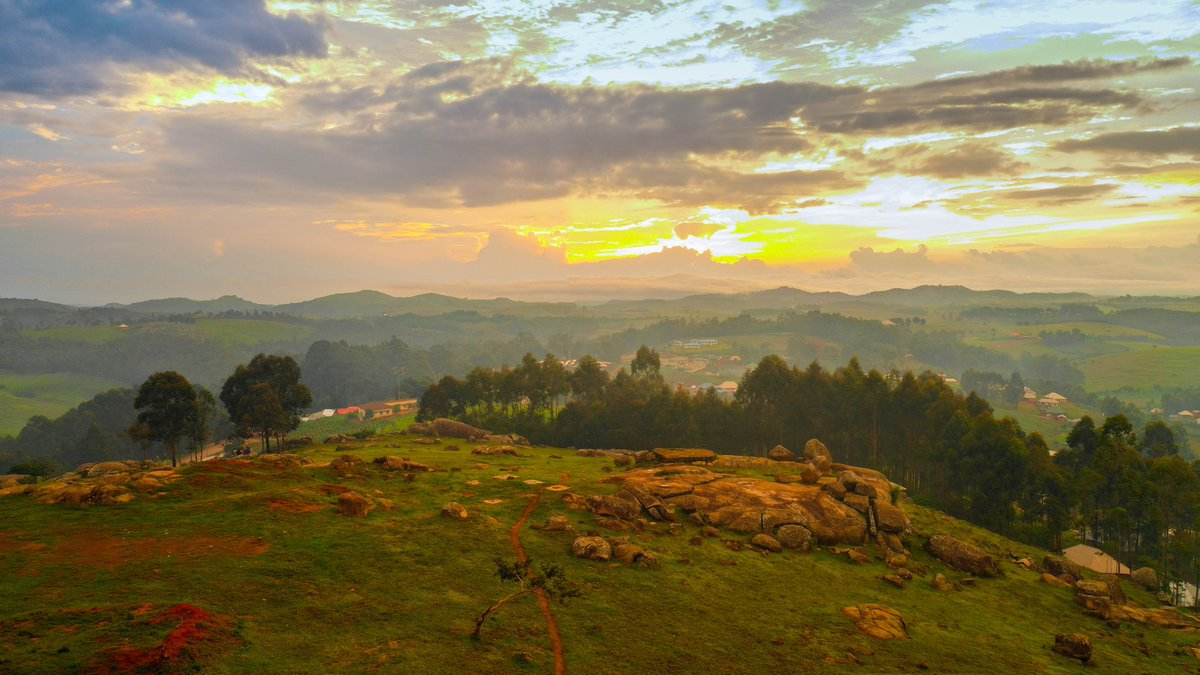
A Mountain in Mambilla

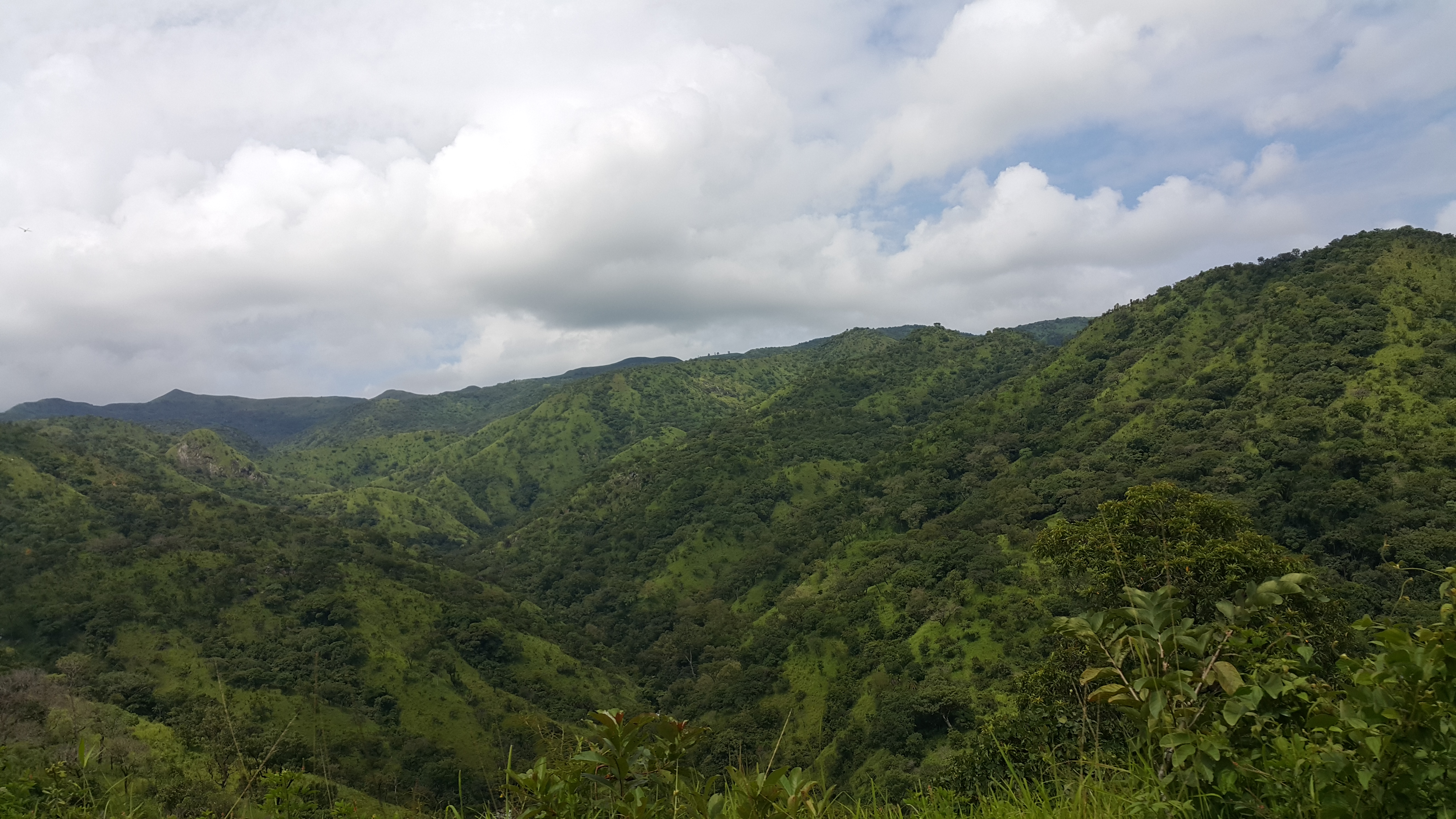
The Mambilla Plateau

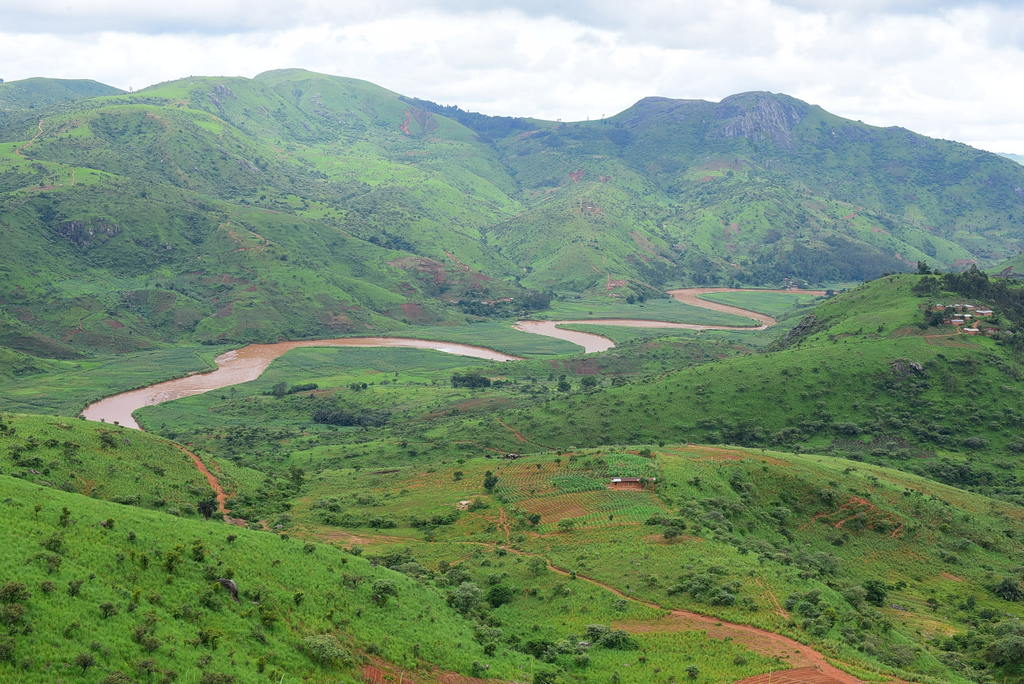
Donga River, Mambilla Plateau, Taraba State

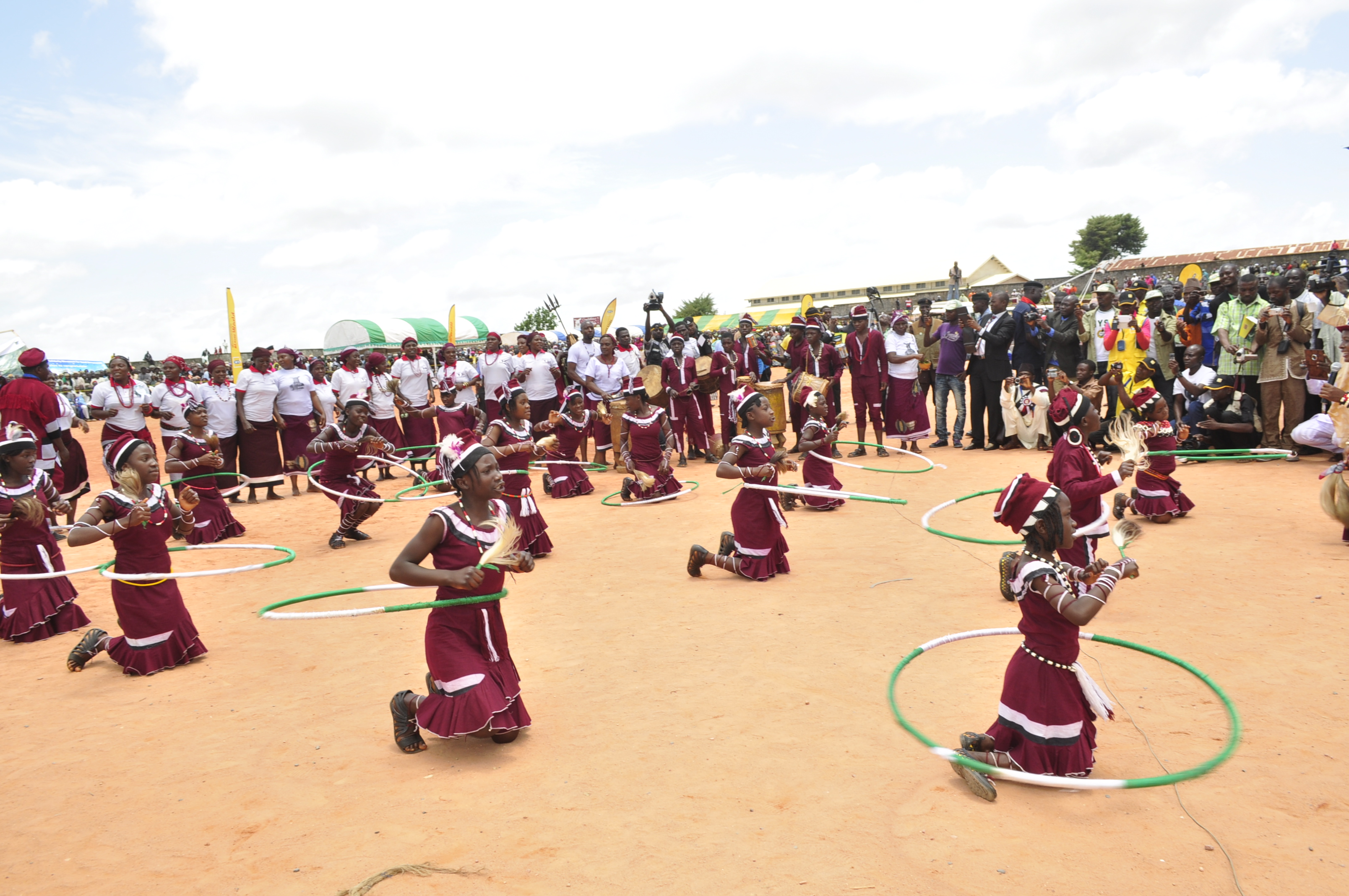
Loop traditional dancers from Taraba State

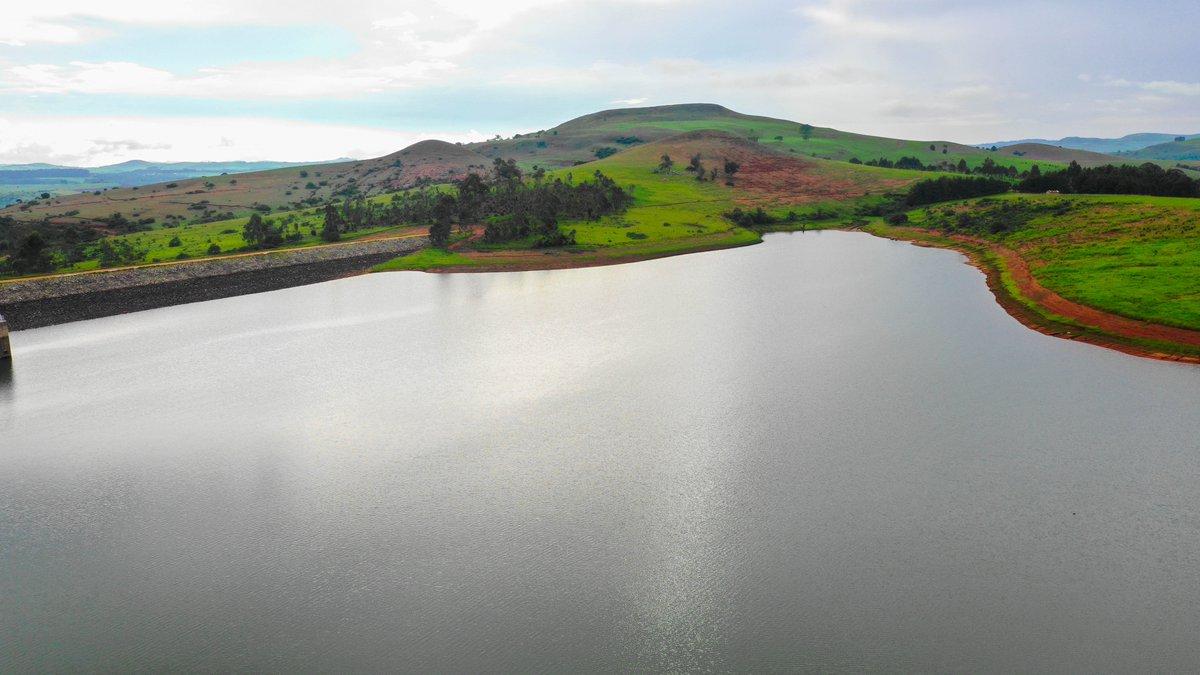
Gwagir Lake (SGEN or Tunga) in Mambilla, Taraba State

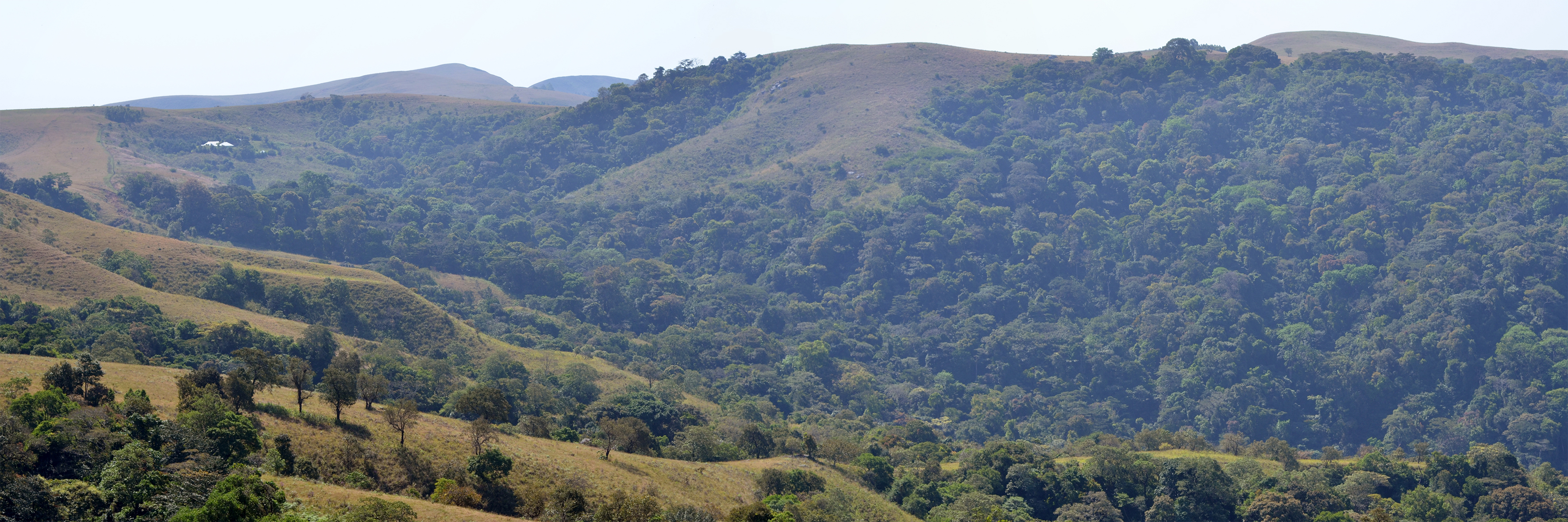
Ngel Nyaki Forest Reserve, Mambilla Plateau, 2012

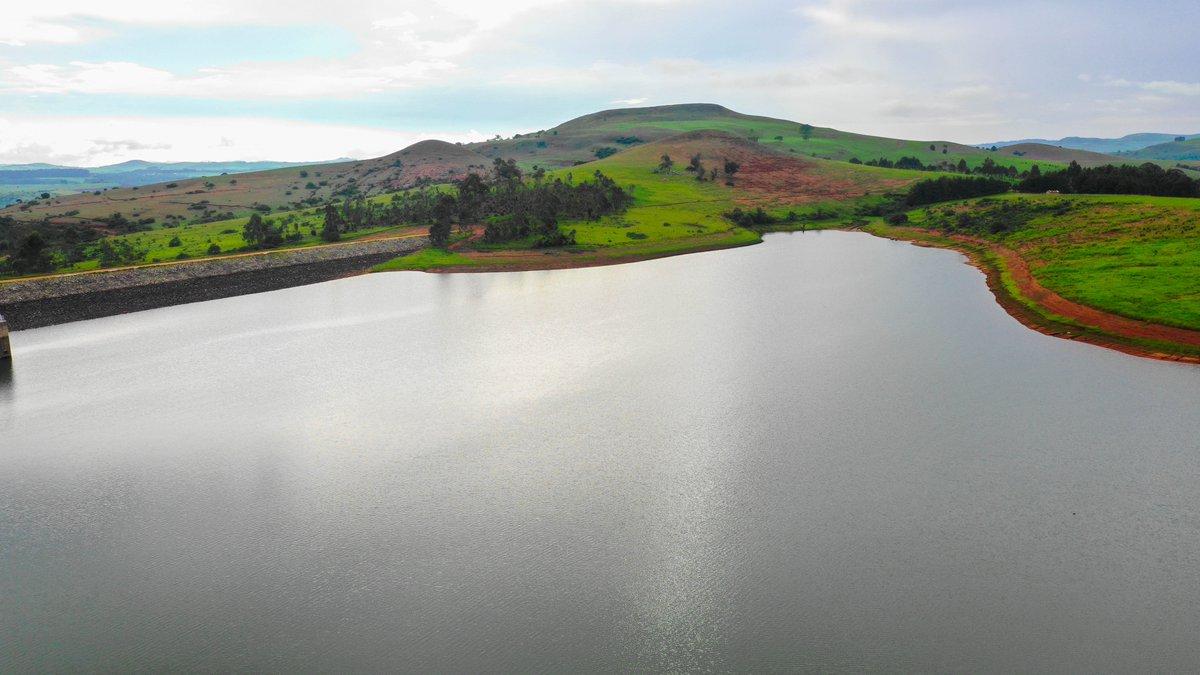
Cijin Lake in Gembu

== Notable people ==
- Late Aisha Alhassan - Former Nigerian Minister of Women Affairs, Former Senator of the Northern Zone of Taraba
- Emmanuel Bwacha - Former Senator Representing Southern Taraba.
- Shaakaa Chira - Auditor-General of the Federation
- Theophilus Danjuma - Retired General, Politician, Businessman, Nigerian Chief of Army Staff (1975–1979), Minister of Defense (1999–2003)
- Anna Darius Ishaku - Barrister, Wife of former governor Darius Ishaku
- Darius Ishaku - Former Governor of Taraba state
- David Jimkuta -Current Senator Representing Southern Taraba.
- Archbishop Ignatius Ayau Kaigama - The current Archbishop of the Catholic Archdiocese of Abuja
- Agbu Kefas - Current Governor of Taraba State
- Abdullahi Bala Lau - Islamic scholar, cleric, mufassir, and preacher, popularly known as Sheikh Balalau
- Shuaibu Isa Lau - Senator representing North Taraba
- Saleh Mamman - Nigerian minister of power
- Haruna Manu - Senator Representing Central Taraba, Former Deputy Governor, Former Member House of Representative of the Bali Gassol Federal Constituency
- Mahmud Mohammed - Nigerian Jurist and former Chief Justice of Nigeria
- Jolly Nyame - Former Governor of Taraba state
- Danbaba Suntai - Nigerian pharmacist, Politician, Former Governor of Taraba state
- Abbas Njidda Tafida - Current Emir of Muri
- Yusuf Abubakar Yusuf - Former Senator Representing Central Taraba, Member of the All Progressive Congress(APC), Caretaker/Extraordinary Convention Planning Committee (CECPC)
