= 2024 Nigerian general strike =

Labour strike in Nigeria

- Date: 31 May 2024 – 18 July 2024
- Location: Nigeria
- Caused by: Cost-of-living crisis
- Goals: Increase of the minimum wage (initially to ₦494,000; later reduced to ₦250,000)
- Methods: Strike actions
- Status: Concluded: Unions and federal government agree on a ₦70,000 minimum wage; Minimum wage to be reviewed every 3 years; Federal government pledges increased investment in infrastructure.

Parties
Nigeria Labour Congress; Trade Union Congress	Government of Nigeria

Lead figures
Joe Ajaero; Festus Osifo	Bola Tinubu; Lateef Fagbemi

On 31 May 2024, the Nigeria Labour Congress (NLC) and Trade Union Congress (TUC) called for an indefinite general strike, demanding the country's monthly minimum wage be raised from ₦30,000 to ₦494,000. This came as a response to a national cost-of-living crisis, as the price of food and electricity overtook the minimum wage, which is relatively low for the large African economy.

The country's national grid and its airports were shut down on 3 June 2024, as were banks, hospitals and schools. The government responded by denouncing the unions' demands as "unreasonable" and declaring the strike to be illegal. The following day, the NLC and TUC suspended the strike, pending talks with the government over raising the minimum wage. Weeks of discussions and negotiations subsequently took place, during which the unions reduced their demanded minimum wage increase to ₦250,000.

Following a series of meetings with the government, on 18 July 2024, the NLC and TUC agreed to an increased minimum wage of ₦70,000, subject to a minimum wage review every three years, with the federal government also pledging to increase investment in transportation infrastructure and renewable energy. NLC leader Joe Ajaero expressed mixed feelings about the settlement, but remained optimistic about the new triennial review period.

== Background ==
Since the election of Bola Tinubu as President of Nigeria in 2023, his government has carried out a number of economic reforms that have resulted in inflation rising to its highest rate in almost three decades, exacerbating Nigeria's cost-of-living crisis. In response to the rising cost-of-living, the Nigeria Labour Congress (NLC) and Trade Union Congress (TUC) has led a series of major strikes in the country, in an attempt to pressure the government to provide relief for households affected by rising costs and raise the minimum wage.

Although Nigeria has one of the largest economies in Africa, its minimum wage is relatively low compared with other African countries. The government proposed a 100% increase of the minimum wage from ₦30,000 to ₦60,000, but the unions rejected this as "unsustainable" and demanded a larger increase. According to BBC News, the monthly cost of the average Nigerian family's rice consumption is greater even than the government's proposed raised minimum wage.

== Strike action ==
=== General strike and economic shutdown ===
After talks between unions and the government to raise the minimum wage collapsed, on Friday 31 May 2024, the NLC and TUC declared that an indefinite general strike would be held until their demands were met. The unions demanded an increase in the monthly minimum wage from ₦30,000 to ₦494,000. The NLC stated that its aims were to establish a "living wage" and described the current minimum wage as a "starvation wage". They also demanded the reversal of the government's electricity tariff hike, which had caused a rising price of electricity.

On Monday 3 June, union workers in the electricity and airline industries stopped work, resulting in the complete shut down of the national grid and air travel throughout the country. According to the Transmission Company of Nigeria (TCN), operators of the power grid were forcibly removed from their stations and beaten. Striking workers were also photographed ordering officials of the Nigerian tax agency out of their offices.

Striking workers also cut the electricity and water supplies to the National Assembly, while protests blocked the gates to the assembly building. Banks and hospitals were also reportedly shut down by the strike. Speaking to CNN, one doctor expressed worry that the Nigerian healthcare system was "on the verge of collapse", as hospitals were unable to function without electricity from the national grid. Schools were also shut down by the strike. Unions in the oil industry have likewise threatened to stop work, although Gbenga Komolafe responded that systems had been established to prevent disruption to oil production.

=== Negotiations ===
On Tuesday 4 June 2024, the NLC and TUC announced that they were suspending the general strike for a week, after the government signalled its willingness to raise the minimum wage higher than their previous proposal of ₦60,000. As union leaders and the federal government met for talks on the proposed wage rise, NLC secretary Tayo Aboyeji said that the strike would resume the following week, if the government failed to come to an agreement with the unions. The Nigeria Union of Petroleum and Natural Gas Workers (NUPNGW), which represents workers in the country's large petroleum industry, said it would hold off from recalling its workers while it waited to see the results of the negotiations.

During the negotiations, the NLC significantly lowered their demanded minimum wage from ₦494,000 to ₦250,000. Following a week of negotiations, on 10 June 2024, the NLC announced that it would reject any proposal for raising the minimum wage to ₦62,000 and even to ₦100,000, which it described as a "starvation wage". Assistant general secretary Chris Onyeka reiterated the union's demands for a higher wage, stating that the union would not settle for any less than ₦250,000, which they "considered enough concession to the government". The following day, when the union's deadline passed, NLC president Joe Ajaero said that they would not resume the strike until they heard President Tinubu's decision. Ajaero said he was hopeful that "this President will do the right thing". The NLC outlined that the two union centres would consider any proposal made by Tinubu to the National Assembly, ruling out an immediate return to strike action, which it considered to be a last resort.

On 25 June 2024, minimum wage proposals were delayed while the federal government continued its consultation with state governors and employers' associations. The TUC appealed for the government to expedite the process of introducing the new minimum wage law. In response to the delay, the TUC and NLC called an emergency meeting to discuss further action. The NLC criticised the government's delay, which is said "creates room for injurious speculation". On 29 June, the NLC and TUC rejected a bid by state governors to take over negotiations and independently set minimum wages at the state level, which the NLC described as an "unfriendly and anti-worker" proposal; the unions continued to insist on a national minimum wage increase.

=== Other strike actions ===
On 19 June 2024, the Academic Staff Union of Universities (ASUU) announced that it would be beginning a nationwide strike in July, citing non-payment of salaries by the government, which had implemented a "no work, no pay policy" during a previous strike. An ultimatum to the federal government was also signed by the Non-Academic Staff Union of Educational and Associated Institutions (NASU), which called for four months of withheld salaries to be paid within two weeks. The ASUU accused president Tinubu of ignoring the issues affecting them, reporting that the government hadn't met with the union since Tinubu first took power. The Nigeria Union of Journalists (NUJ) urged Tinubu to address the dispute with the ASUU.

On 25 June 2024, 1,800 petrol stations were shut down in northeastern Nigeria, after the Independent Petroleum Marketers Association of Nigeria (IPMAN) began a strike in protest against an anti-smuggling operation by the Nigeria Customs Service (NCS). IPMAN chairman Alhaji Dahiru Buba blamed harassment of petrol workers by the NCS for the strike, which he said would continue until the NCS ceased its operations against them. The News Agency of Nigeria reported a reduction in vehicle traffic during the strike.

=== Settlement ===
In July 2024, the federal government began pushing for a final settlement to the minimum wage talks, with President Bola Tinubu inviting representatives of the NLC and TUC to meet him in Aso Villa on Thursday 11 July. Before meeting with the unions, the government agreed with representatives of the private sector on a ₦62,000 minimum wage, well below the unions' demands. In his address to Joe Ajaero and Festus Osifo, Tinubu emphasised that his government's priority was the welfare of Nigerian workers, saying that "A happy worker is a productive worker. And society depends on the productivity of the happy worker." After Ajaero and Osifo both praised the government for upholding financial autonomy for local governments, Ajaero insisted on the need for a national minimum wage increase due to rising levels of inflation. The meeting ultimately adjourned without a settlement, with a subsequent meeting being set for the following week. Ajaero described the meeting not as a negotiation, but a "discussion on current economic realities". While continuing to maintain their demand for ₦250,000 minimum wage, the NLC and TUC expressed optimism that the Tinubu government would offer a substantial increase to the proposed offer of ₦62,000. Minister of Information Mohammed Idris Malagi clarified that the meeting had also included discussions of regular minimum wage reviews, to take place every 2 or 3 years.

Following the second meeting between the unions and the federal government on 18 July 2024, the NLC and TUC agreed to a settlement with the federal government on a new minimum wage reform: the national minimum wage was to be set at ₦70,000, further minimum wage reviews will take place every 3 years and the federal government would invest further in transportation infrastructure and renewable energy. A bill to raise the minimum wage was sent to the National Assembly, with Bayo Onanuga reporting that it would be ready by Tuesday 23 July 2024. Ajaero expressed mixed feelings about the settlement, but stated that he had agreed to it due to the state of the Nigerian economy, incentivised by the offer of a triennial minimum wage review.

== Responses ==
=== Government response ===
The Nigerian government has claimed that the unions' demands would "cripple economy" and cause job losses. Presidential spokesperson Bayo Onanuga himself accused the unions of "blackmail" and "sabotage", saying that "Labour is harming the Nigerian people they claim to be fighting for." Lateef Fagbemi, the Minister of Justice, declared the strike to be illegal. Mohammed Idris Malagi, the Minister of Information, said that the unions' demands would "destabilise the economy".

=== Public response ===
The strike has been met with mixed reactions from the Nigerian public, with some expressing support for its aims of raising the minimum wage, while others worried that its targeting of public infrastructure would harm average Nigerians. According to the National Bureau of Statistics, 92% of Nigerian workers are in the informal economy and have no union representation. Speaking to the BBC, one information worker in Kano said that he would not settle for less than ₦100,000, although he worried that even that would not be enough as inflation continued.

=== Press response ===
Social media influencer Reno Omokri rejected the strikers' demands for higher wages, denounced NLC leader Joe Ajaero as an "economic saboteur" and accused him of trying "to please his master, Peter Obi." Writing for This Day, columnist Onikepo Braithwaite denounced the sabotage actions taken during the strike as a form of "domestic terrorism", although she also wrote sympathetically about the need for a living wage and called for "both sides to be reasonable". In contrast, the Daily Trust commended the unions for suspending the strike ahead of negotiations and, holding the federal government responsible for a lack of action on the minimum wage, called on it to seek a consensus with the unions over a wage rise. Writing for Vanguard, PDP politician Chris Ekpenyong criticised the strike actions as "ineffective", arguing that a minimum wage rise only represented a temporary solution and that a lasting solution to the country's economic issues required structural reforms such as diversification.

== See also ==
- 1945 Nigerian general strike
- 2021 Nigerian doctors' strike
