= Trades Union Congress (disambiguation) =

Trades Union Congress or Trade Union Congress can refer to:

- Aden Trade Union Congress
- Guyana Trades Union Congress
- Irish Trades Union Congress
- Malaysian Trades Union Congress
- National Trades Union Congress in Singapore
- Scottish Trades Union Congress
- Trade Union Congress of Nigeria (1942), TUCN, a trade union federation established in 1942
- Nigeria Trade Union Congress, NTUC, a breakaway of TUCN in 1960 that later merged to form the Nigeria Labour Congress
- Trade Union Congress of Nigeria, TUC, a trade union federation established in 2005
- Trades Union Congress in the United Kingdom
- Trade Union Congress of Eswatini
- Trades Union Congress of Ghana
- Trade Union Congress of Namibia
- Trade Union Congress of Tanzania
- Trade Union Congress of the Philippines
