= Samuel Bassey =

Nigerian trade unionist

- Born: Samuel Udo Bassey
- Citizenship: Nigerian
- Occupation: Trade unionist

Samuel Udo Bassey was a Nigerian trade unionist, he was a member of the radical but now defunct Nigerian Trade Union Congress. Along with, Michael Imoudu, Gogo Chu Nzeribe and Wahab Goodluck, they constituted the activist wing of trade unionism in Nigeria during the Nigerian First Republic. He was a former secretary of Nigeria Produce Marketing Company and the Amalgamated Associated Company.

In 1950s, as the secretary of the Municipal and Local Authority Workers Union (National Union of Local Government Employees), he was member of the central labor union body, the All-Nigeria Trade Union Federation headed by Imoudu. A split within the body led to the exit of some moderates, and Bassey subsequently became the secretary of the federation. In 1959, the radical wing merged with the National Council of Trade Unions in Nigeria to form the Nigerian Trade Union Congress, also headed by Imoudu, the congress was later affiliated with the Pan Africanist All-African Trade Union Federation, formed by Kwame Nkrumah. A split within the radical led to the emergence of Goodluck as NTUC president and Bassey as the general secretary. The new group formed an alliance with Tunji Otegbeye to form the Socialist Workers and Farmers Party in 1963. The new party was socialist oriented and did not trust the First Republic political parties to protect the interest of the working class. He believed in the inevitability of strikes, saying that employers are too greedy to channel some of their profits to workers’ welfare while government was no less myopic. On February 19, 1971, he was detained by the regime of Yakubu Gowon for 15 months. In 1974, Bassey and a few labour leaders, who were attending the burial of a colleague decided to move towards a united front, they signed resolution to fight on a common front and established a working committee that will convene a conference of all labour unions. This resolution also known as the Apena Declaration of Trade Union Unity laid the foundation for the present Nigeria Labour Congress.,
