= Wahab Goodluck =

Nigerian labour leader

- Born: 11 July 1923
- Died: 10 September 1991 (aged 68)
- Notable work: The founding President of the Nigeria Labour Congress (NLC)

Wahab Omorilewa Goodluck (11 July 1923 – 10 September 1991) was the founding President of the Nigeria Labour Congress (NLC). During the Olusegun Obasanjo administration in the 1970s, he was barred from trade unionism along with Michael Imoudu, Samuel Bassey and a few others.

In 1974, the four central labour organisations of Nigeria were the Nigeria Trade Union Congress (NTUC) led by Goodluck, the Labour Unity Front (LUF) led by Michael Imoudu, the Nigeria Workers' Council (NWC) led by Ramon and the United Labour Congress of Nigeria led by Kaltungo and Odeyemi (ULCN). Only the ULCN was officially recognised by the Nigerian government. In that year, the four groups merged to form one central labor organisation, the Nigeria Labour Congress and fixed its inaugural conference for 18 December 1975.

In 2008, the NLC hosted a 30th anniversary lecture in which it recognized the leadership of Wahab Goodluck and 30 years of struggle.
