= Peace Obiajulu =

Nigerian former trade union leader

President of Trade Union Congress of Nigeria (TUC)
- In office 2005–2007

Personal details
- Born: Nkiruka Peace Abuchukwu; 1954 (age 71–72) Anambra State, Nigeria
- Education: University of Ibadan

Nkiruka Peace Obiajulu // (born c. 1954) is a Nigerian former trade union leader.

Born in Amichi, in Anambra State, as Nkiruka Peace Abuchukwu, she attended school in Onitsha. She hoped to become a pharmacist, but could not afford the tuition fees, so instead qualified as a nurse at University College Hospital, Ibadan, where tuition was free. In 1984, she received a degree in nursing from the University of Ibadan, then worked for the health department of NITEL. She joined the NITEL Senior Staff Association, and was elected to its executive committee in 1988, then in 1991 became its treasurer. She served as treasurer until 1997, when she became president of the union section.

In 1998, Obiajulu was elected as deputy president-general of the Senior Staff Association of Utilities, Statutory Corporations and Government Companies (SSASCGOC), the first woman to serve on its national body. In 2001, she became the union's president, the first woman to lead a trade union in Nigeria.

In 2005, various senior staff associations formed the Trade Union Congress of Nigeria (TUC), and Obiajulu was elected as its president, the first woman to lead a trade union confederation in Africa. As leader, she defended union's right to strike, in defiance of government legislation against it. She was also active in Union Network International, and worked closely with leaders of the Nigeria Labour Congress.

In 2007, Obiajulu stood for re-election to the TUC presidency, but when it became apparent she would not be elected, she instead endorsed Peter Esele, who succeeded her. She remained active in SSASCGOC, and presented a paper entitled "Employment Conditions and Workers’ Productivity: Lessons of 40-year of Unionism in Nigerian Ports Authority" to the union in 2019.

In her spare time, Obiajulu has been a Sunday school teacher at the Foursquare Gospel Church in Nigeria and a newspaper columnist. She has four children.

Trade union offices
Preceded by New position	President of the Trade Union Congress of Nigeria; 2005–2007	Succeeded by Peter Esele
