= Bobboi Kaigama =

Nigerian trade unionist (born 1962)

Comrade Bobboi Bala Kaigama
- Born: 17 September 1962 (age 63); Sardauna, Taraba State
- Organization: Trade Union Congress
- Title: former President of Trade Union Congress
- Term: 21 June 2013 – 1 July 2019
- Predecessor: Peter Esele
- Successor: Quadri Olaleye
- Political party: NNPP
- Movement: Trade Unionist
- Honours: Tafidan Mambilla

Comrade Bobboi Kaigama (born 17 September 1962) is a Nigerian trade unionist and former president of the Trade Union Congress of Nigeria.

== Early life ==
Bobboi Kaigama was born on 17 September 1962 in a village called Kakara in Sardauna in Taraba State. He obtained a Bachelor of Science degree in Urban and Regional Planning and Master of Business Administration in Project Management Technology from Obafemi Awolowo University and Federal University of Technology, Owerri.

== Career ==
Kaigama was the chairman of the Taraba State branch of the Association of Senior Civil Servants of Nigeria (ASCSN), a trade union for staff working in the civil service in Nigeria. Since 2005, he has been a member of the National Executive Council of Trade Union Congress of Nigeria (TUC). Kaigama was the National Vice President of ASCSN till 2013 where he was appointed National President of both ASCSN and TUC. These two trade unions represent all senior staff unions and associations in both public and private sectors in Nigeria. He went on to serve two terms as President of TUC from 2013 to 2019.

In 2025, he was nominated by Bola Ahmed Tinubu as a Federal Commissioner representing Taraba State at the Federal Character Commission (FCC). State House Abuja. On 27 November 2025 his appointment was confirmed by the Senate of Nigeria alongside other nominees following a screening report submitted by the Senate Committee on Federal Character and Inter-Governmental Affairs.

As a commissioner of the Federal Character Commission, Kaigama will be part of the body mandated to implement and enforce the “federal character principle” ensuring fairness and equity in the distribution of public posts and socio-economic infrastructures across Nigeria’s federating units.

=== Political career ===
Kaigama applied for the senatorial ticket of Taraba Central under All Progressives Congress but lost to Marafa Bashir Abba in the primaries. He left the party shortly after later joining New Nigeria People's Party and was chosen to run for Senator of Taraba Central. Kaigama lost the election to the PDP candidate, Haruna Manu, who was the state's outgoing Deputy Governor.
