= Trade Union Congress of Nigeria =

Trade Union Congress of Nigeria may refer to:

- Trade Union Congress of Nigeria (1942)
- Trade Union Congress of Nigeria (2005)
