= Emeka Enejere =

Nigerian academic and political scientist (1944–2016)

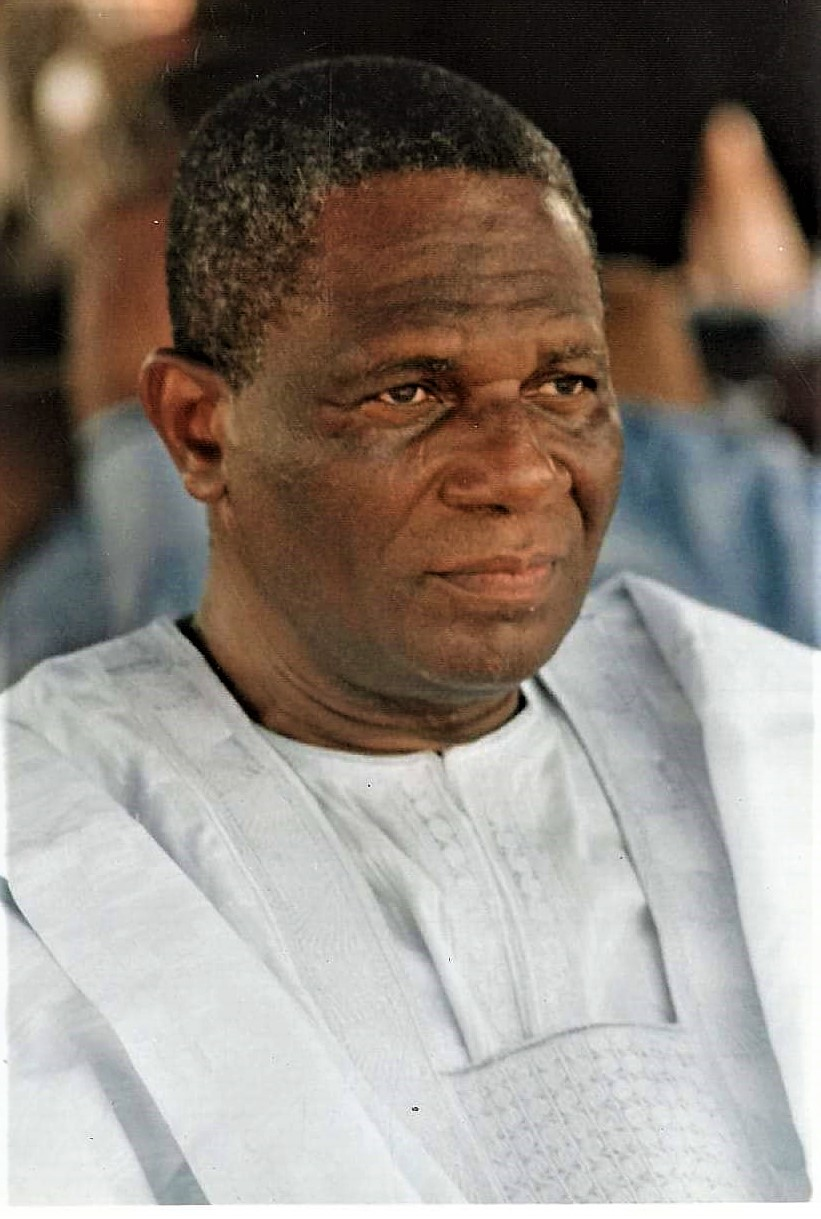
- Born: Emmanuel Nnaemeka Enejere; August 8, 1944; Nsukka
- Died: May 20, 2016 (aged 71)
- Citizenship: Nigeria
- Occupations: Academic, Activist, Political Scientist
- Years active: 1966–2016
- Title: 14th Pro-Chancellor of University of Nigeria, Nsukka
- Spouse: Pearl Enejere (née Amobi)
- Children: 4

Academic background
- Education: University of Nigeria, Nsukka; New School for Social Research

Emmanuel Nnaemeka Enejere ((1944–2016) was a Nigerian academic and a political scientist. He was the 14th Pro-chancellor and Chairman of the Governing Council of the University of Nigeria, Nsukka and a former president of the National Union of Biafran Students in the midst of the Nigerian Civil War.

== Early life and education ==
Enejere was born in Nsukka into the family of Israel Aneke Idah and Obochi Enejere on August 8, 1944. He obtained his first school leaving certificate from St. Paul's Practicing School, Awka in 1957. In 1962, he obtained his West African Senior School Certificate from Okongwu Memorial Grammar School, Nnewi. In 1971, he graduated with a BSc (Political Science) from the University of Nigeria, Nsukka. He proceeded to New School for Social Research, New York City US where he obtained his M.A. (Pol. Sc.) in 1975 and passed his PhD examination with Distinction in 1977.

== Student leadership during the Nigerian Civil War ==
In 1966, he was elected the President of the Students Union Government, University of Nigeria, Nsukka and at the same time the Vice President of National Union of Nigerian Students. In 1967, he was elected the President of Eastern Nigerian Students Union (ENSU). On May 30, 1967, Lt. Colonel Odumegwu Ojukwu declared the Eastern Region independent of Nigeria and known as the Democratic Republic of Biafra. As soon as Ojukwu declared Biafra, the Students’ Union of the UNN, led by its president, Emeka Enejere, formed the National Union of Biafran Students (NUBS), breaking away from the National Union of Nigerian Students (NUNS). The Nigerian Civil War began on July 6, 1967. Enejere became the President of the National Union of Biafran Students (NUBS) and led NUBS delegation to the United States, Canada and Western Germany. Enejere's tenure as President of the National Union of Biafran Students involved many campaigns to different Agencies and Foundations and his team succeeded in obtaining relief materials for Biafra, especially from religious organizations like the World Council of Churches. The delegation addressed a catalogue of issues principally concerned with the state of Biafra, the issue of economic blockade, the power of student opinion, the refugee situation, the suffering in refugee camps, and the attendant health problem. To align themselves with members of the then Biafran Republic at home, Enejere and his group wore what The New York Times described as "shabby and ill-fitting clothes". Furthermore, they spoke in quiet voices to demonstrate the mood of the situation but, as The New York Times reported, "their passionate devotion to Biafra was undiminished." The gains made by this delegation were unprecedented. Biafran students studying abroad formed chapters of the NUBS. The NUBS branches in Boston, New York, United Kingdom and Belgium were especially successful in communicating the Biafran point of view to the host nationals. NUBS branches throughout the world engaged in fund raising for Biafra. The typical effort in this wise was the Biafran student standing under the snow, cup in hand and shouting, ‘drop something for the children of Biafra’. The European branches of the NUBS paid for a delegation of the home students to visit North America and Europe. The delegation covered Canada and America and visited forty-five cities in Germany spreading the hope of Biafra. The Americans, and members of other countries resident in America, had the opportunity of hearing the Biafran case first hand, and even seeing the people involved in the civil war. Enejere's delegation was given prominence in the paper. One of the publications, "Five Biafrans seek Aid of U.S. Students" was published in The New York Times of December 18, 1968. The Biafran students criticized the way relief materials were being handled and even tried to organize their own special relief efforts. Furthermore, the NUBS delegation to Europe and America submitted a report that gave a sharp picture suggesting that the Biafran Government were not doing very well in its diplomatic mission. The report specifically fingered the diplomatic effort in North America as not yielding dividends. It recommended the diversification of diplomatic missions to include east European countries. This report irked some Biafran civil servants who were involved in the North American mission. They faced the students and the passport of the President of NUBS and head of the student delegation abroad, Mr. Enejere, was seized. In a latter development, the Biafran Security Organization detained Mr. Enejere and his Vice President. They were later released. In 1970, at the end of the war, Enejere mobilized National Union of Nigerian students to support and catalyze the re-opening of Institutions of Higher Learning in the former Eastern Region.

== Career ==
Enejere worked as a clerk of High Court Registry Enugu between 1963 and 1964. After his BSc in 1972 he worked as Senior Manager, Hardware Division of Union Trading Company (UTC) in Lagos. At the same time, he was a part-time Lecturer of Daily Times of Nigeria Training School for Journalists. During his stay in the United States, he lectured at Westbury College between 1973 and 1974, York College between 1975 and 1979 and Adelphi University Garden City. Upon his return to Nigeria, he secured an appointment with the University of Nigeria, Nsukka on February 5, 1980, as a lecturer in the Department of Political Science where he taught for twelve years and earned himself the name 'Hobbes’. He was a Visiting Lecturer to the Command & Staff College, (JSC, Nigeria Air Force), Kaduna in 1981. He served as a member of the Joint Governing Council of Institute of Management and Technology, IMT, and Anambra State University of Technology, ASUTECH, Enugu (1986). He also served as chairman, Governing Council of Girls Secondary School, Ibagwa-Aka (1987–1988); Chairman, Governing Board of Vanguard Industries, (Anambra State Furniture Company) Enugu (1987–1988); Chairman, Governing Board of LOTTO (Anambra State Lottery Company) Enugu (1988–1989); Member, MAMSER Brain Trust, Abuja, and a host of other bodies. While on Sabbatical from UNN from 1989 to 1990, Enejere served with the Nigerian Presidency in various capacities. These include Deputy Director, Political Education, MAMSER Headquarters, Abuja; Member, MAMSER Study Team of 3 on comparative Analysis of Mobilization Strategies in Africa covering Ethiopia, Tanzania, Ghana, Togo and Nigeria; he developed with others and edited MAMSER Political Education Manual and he served as Editor, MAMSER Publications. He led MAMSER National Headquarters Political Education Campaigns in South-East and South-South Zones of the country, and he made contributions to several Transition-to-Civil-Rule Committees of the Babangida administration Transition Programme through MAMSER. In 1993, he voluntarily retired from the University of Nigeria, Nsukka. Two decades later, on April 9, 2013, he was appointed the 14th Pro-Chancellor/Chairman, Governing Council of the University of Nigeria. However, in December 2013, he was suddenly relieved of his duty, leading to a protest by members of staff and students of the institution against the action.

== Political career ==
In 1982, he aspired for the governorship of the old Anambra State. In 1983, he was a member of the presidential campaign organization of NPN and in 1989, he was a deputy director of Directorate for Social Mobilization where he was inaugurated with Professor Jerry Gana, Claude Ake, Adeoye Akinsanya, Moyibi Amoda, Bode Onimode, and Omafume Onoge. In 1991, he was a political adviser to National Republican Convention (NRC) at their National Headquarters in Abuja. One year later, he was among the political parties delegates from Nigeria to Durban, South Africa to observe the first ANC (South Africa) party convention after Nelson Mandela's release from prison. Between 1993 and 1995, he was a special adviser to Minister of Industry, Alhaji Bamanga Tukur. In 1997, he maintained the same position (SA) with Democratic Party of Nigeria. From January to March 1999, he was the National Director, Planning, Research & Strategy, Alex Ekwueme Presidential Campaign Organization (ALEPCO), and he was also a three-time Igbo-Eze South LGA of Enugu State National delegate of PDP; 1999, 2007 and 2012. From 1999 until 2016, he was consultant to the Government of Rivers State of Nigeria. In 2004, he participated in the NIGERIA-DEBATES STUDY MISSION in Washington DC – sponsored by National Democratic Institute for International Affairs.

== Business career ==
Emeka Enejere was the chairman, LIAISON GROUP, comprising: Venus Communications Limited; Rave Properties Limited; Hi-Tek International (Nigeria) Limited; Crowngate Oil and Gas; Liaison Consultants (Political, Public Relations & Management Services); and ONS Triumph Ltd. (Investment Promotion Company).

== Personal life ==
In the early 1970's, Emeka Enejere married Honourable Justice Pearl Enejere (née Amobi) who hails from Obosi in Anambra State and they have two sons, two daughters, and six grandchildren.

Dr. Emeka Enejere died on Friday, May 20, 2016, at a medical facility in Abuja.
