= Festus Osifo =

Nigerian trade unionist and engineer

President of the Trade Union Congress of Nigeria
- Incumbent
- Assumed office 20 July 2022
- Preceded by: Quadri Olaleye

President of the Petroleum and Natural Gas Senior Staff Association of Nigeria
- Incumbent
- Assumed office 28 August 2020
- Preceded by: Ndukaku Michael Ohaeri

Personal details
- Born: Benin City, Edo State, Nigeria
- Education: Yaba College of Technology; Petroleum Training Institute; University of Portsmouth; Heriot-Watt University
- Occupation: Trade unionist; Mechanical engineer

Festus Osifo is a Nigerian trade unionist and mechanical engineer. He has been president of the Petroleum and Natural Gas Senior Staff Association of Nigeria (PENGASSAN) since August 2020, and president of the Trade Union Congress of Nigeria (TUC) since July 2022, holding both offices concurrently.

Before entering full-time union leadership he worked as an engineer for Schlumberger and TotalEnergies in Nigeria. As TUC president he was one of the two labour leaders who led the 2024 Nigerian general strike over the national minimum wage, and as PENGASSAN president he led the September 2025 nationwide strike against the Dangote Refinery over the dismissal of workers who had joined the union.

== Early life and education ==
Osifo was born in Benin City, Edo State. He attended Iyobosa Primary School and Immaculate Conception College, both in Benin City, before taking an Ordinary National Diploma in mechanical engineering at Yaba College of Technology.

He obtained a Higher National Diploma in mechanical engineering from the Petroleum Training Institute in Effurun, where he was the best graduating student of the 2003/2004 session. He subsequently earned a first-class Bachelor of Engineering degree in mechanical and manufacturing engineering from the University of Portsmouth in England, and a Master of Science degree in petroleum engineering from Heriot-Watt University in Edinburgh.

== Engineering career ==
Osifo began his career in the oil and gas industry with Schlumberger Nigeria before joining TotalEnergies Exploration and Production Nigeria, where he worked as an engineer. He is a member of the Nigerian Society of Engineers, the Council for the Regulation of Engineering in Nigeria and the Society of Petroleum Engineers.

== Trade union career ==
=== PENGASSAN ===
Osifo served as chairman of the PENGASSAN Producers Forum between 2016 and 2018. On 28 August 2020, at the union's sixth triennial national delegates' conference in Abuja, he was elected the 16th president of PENGASSAN, defeating Roland Frederick of the Shell branch by 200 votes to 183. He was returned unopposed at the seventh triennial conference in May 2023.

In September 2022 he led union protests over crude oil theft, telling reporters that the scale of organised theft threatened both national revenue and the safety of union members, and warning that PENGASSAN might withdraw its members from operating companies if the authorities did not act. In March 2025 the union threatened a nationwide strike against Sterling Oil Exploration and Energy Production Company over alleged breaches of Nigeria's expatriate quota rules and the dismissal of workers who had raised welfare concerns.

==== Dangote Refinery dispute ====
In September 2025 PENGASSAN accused the Dangote Refinery of dismissing more than 800 Nigerian employees who had applied to join the union. Osifo said the union had written to the refinery asking that union dues be deducted, and that dismissal letters followed shortly afterwards. The union began a nationwide strike on 28 September that disrupted crude and gas supply to the 650,000-barrel-per-day facility and parts of the wider oil sector, though the refinery said its operations continued.

The strike was suspended on 1 October after mediation by the federal government. Osifo said PENGASSAN was not satisfied with the terms of the communiqué, which the union declined to sign, but had suspended the action out of respect for the state institutions that brokered it; he warned that the strike could resume if the agreement were not honoured. The refinery's management publicly criticised the union in strongly worded terms during the dispute.

=== Trade Union Congress ===
Osifo was elected president-general of the Trade Union Congress of Nigeria on 20 July 2022 at the congress's 12th triennial national delegates' conference in Abuja. He polled 688 of the 728 delegate votes, defeating Oyikan Olasanoye, who received 18; 22 votes were invalid. Because of internal disputes within the congress, the conference held an election only for the office of president. He succeeded Quadri Olaleye.

In April 2025 he was returned unopposed, together with 18 other members of the national administrative council, for a four-year term at the congress's first quadrennial delegates' conference, held alongside the TUC's 20th anniversary in Abuja.

==== Minimum wage campaign ====
As TUC president, Osifo represented organised labour alongside Joe Ajaero of the Nigeria Labour Congress in the tripartite negotiations over a new national minimum wage. Labour rejected successive government offers, including one of ₦60,000, with Osifo arguing that the government had not shown how a worker could meet transport and food costs on the proposed figure. On 31 May 2024 he announced an indefinite nationwide strike, citing the breakdown of the wage negotiations and an increase in electricity tariffs. The dispute concluded in July 2024 with agreement on a minimum wage of ₦70,000, subject to review every three years.

Osifo has continued to argue that wage increases alone are insufficient without macroeconomic stabilisation, saying in 2026 that even a much larger minimum wage would have limited effect if the value of the naira were not addressed.

== Board memberships ==
Osifo was appointed to the fifth National Stakeholders Working Group of the Nigeria Extractive Industries Transparency Initiative in July 2021, as the representative of extractive industry professional unions. He also sits on the board of the National Pension Commission as the representative of the Trade Union Congress.

== Criticism ==
In October 2025, members of PENGASSAN's Nigerian Midstream and Downstream Petroleum Regulatory Authority branch petitioned the registrar of trade unions accusing Osifo and the union's general secretary, Lumumba Okugbawa, of undemocratic conduct and breaches of the union's constitution, principally over the national leadership's appointment of a caretaker committee for the branch.

== Succession arrangements ==
In 2026 Osifo said PENGASSAN had amended its constitution so that the elected deputy president would automatically succeed to the presidency, a model he said was adapted from the Institute of Chartered Accountants of Nigeria and intended to reduce the disputes that had accompanied earlier leadership transitions. The change was to take effect at the union's delegates' conference scheduled for 22 August 2026.
