= Ali Chiroma =

Nigerian trade unionist (1933–2024)

Comrade Ali Chiroma OON mni
- Born: 27 February 1933; Maiduguri, Colony and Protectorate of Nigeria
- Died: 2 April 2024 (aged 91); Maiduguri, Nigeria
- Occupation: Health worker
- Known for: Trade unionism

Member of the Governing Body of the International Labour Organization
- In office 1984–1990

President of the Nigeria Labour Congress
- In office 1984–1988
- Preceded by: Hassan Sunmonu
- Succeeded by: Pascal Bafyau

Deputy National President of the Nigeria Labour Congress
- In office 1981–1984

Deputy President of the Medical and Health Workers' Union of Nigeria
- In office 1978–1981

Ali Chiroma OON mni (27 February 1933 – 2 April 2024) was a Nigerian trade unionist who was president of Nigerian Labour Congress (NLC) from 1984 to 1988. He was forced out of the position by the military government when it dissolved the union in 1988. During Abacha's regime, he was brought back into labour matters as the sole administrator of NUPENG.

== Life and career ==
Chiroma spent his early years in Maiduguri, Borno State. He attended Yerwa Elementary School and Borno Middle School (1945–1949). He trained as a medical field assistant and worked in Jalingo and Mubi. In 1977, he was principal School of Health Technology, Maiduguri. Chiroma joined trade unionism at the age of seventeen and was president of the Rural Health Workers Union in 1960. In 1978, after many smaller trade unions were coalesced into forty two industrial unions, Chiroma became deputy president of the Medical and Health Workers' Union of Nigeria. At the NLC congress in 1981, he was voted as the union's deputy president. He was voted president in 1984, succeeding Hassan Sunmonu.

As president, one major responsibility of Chiroma was to keep the union united as NLC like many of its predecessors was split into ideological groups pulling it in different directions and a military president was beginning to influence some union leaders. Chiroma's tenure began at the onset of a change in government from a democratic administration that was ended by a military coup in December 1983. He had the difficult task of managing the union while austerity measures provided reason for workers to be sacked without adherence to disengagement rules and wages were frozen by the new military administration. As head of the central working committee of NLC, he was also involved in protest concerning changes in minimum wage regulations and acceptance of IMF loan terms. In 1986, a new military president proposed changes to the minimum wage act that will increase the employee threshold for businesses to be bound by the act, the proposed change was from employers with 50 employees to a new threshold of 500 employees. NLC developed a consistent campaign against the amendment with threats of a national strike which led the proposal to be shelved. However, his tenure was more known for the protest against the removal of fuel subsidy. The adoption of a structural adjustment programme (SAP) by President Babangida which favored market forces meant subsidies for fuel consumption was likely to be removed. Chiroma's NLC coordinated rallies with state chapters in protest against the removal of subsidies while Chiroma criticized and opposed many of the elements of SAP. In December 1987, leadership of NLC were detained and the government increased pressure on NLC to withdraw its opposition to the elements of SAP. In 1988, division within the NLC provided the opportunity for the government to disband the leadership and elect a sole administrator.

Chiroma died on 2 April 2024, at the age of 91.
