= Petroleum Product Pricing Regulatory Agency =

The Petroleum Products Pricing Regulatory Agency (PPPRA) was an agency of the government of Nigeria established in 2003 to, among other responsibilities, monitor and regulate the supply and distribution, and determine the prices of petroleum products in Nigeria. Its headquarters was located in Abuja, Nigeria. However, since the passage of the Petroleum Industry Act (2021), the agency is now defunct as it has merged with two other defunct agencies (Department of Petroleum Resources (DPR) and the Petroleum Equalisation Fund (PEF) to form the Nigerian Midstream and Downstream Petroleum Regulatory Agency (NMDPRA).

Before the PIA enactment, the Chairman of the Agency was Atuonwo A. Obinna (2021), and the Executive Secretary was Abdulkadir Saidu Umar (2018-2021). Previous Chief Executives are Dr. Oluwole Oluleye (2003 - 2009), Mr. Abiodun Ibikunle (2009 - 2011), Engr. Goody Chike Egbuji (2011 - 2011), Dr. Reginald Stanley (2011 - 2014), Mr. Farouk Ahmed (2014 - 2016) and Mrs. Sotonye E. Iyoyo (2016 - 2018)

The PPPRA had a 26-member Board which inter alia includes the Central Bank of Nigeria (CBN), Federal Ministry of Finance (FMF), Nigeria Employers Consultative Association (NECA), Nigeria Labour Congress (NLC), Trade Union Congress (TUC), Petroleum and Natural Gas Senior Staff Association of Nigeria (PENGASSAN), National Union of Petroleum and National Gas Workers (NUPENG), National Association of Road Transport Owners (NARTO), National Union of Road Transport Workers (NURTW), Nigerian Guild of Editors, National Association of Chambers of Commerce, Industry, Mines and Agriculture (NACCIMA), MOMAN, DAPPMA, Independent Petroleum Marketers Association of Nigeria (IPMAN), amongst others.
