= Fagbenro Beyioku =

Nigerian trade unionist and politician

- Fagbenro
- Citizenship: Nigeria
- Occupations: Politician; Trade Unionist
- Notable work: Leader of the Calabar branch of Nigeria Civil Service Union

Oluyimi Ayodele Fagbenro Beyioku was a Nigerian trade unionist and politician. He was also known as a follower of Ifá, having been a prominent follower of a syncretic society called Ijo Orunmila.

== Early life ==
Born in Aworo village to the family of Akintunde Beyioku-Fagbenro, he worked for the Marine Department, the predecessor of the Nigerian Ports Authority(NPA).

== Career ==
He was originally a trade unionist before entering politics. In 1945, he was leader of the Calabar branch of Nigeria Civil Service Union. Beyioku served as a ports trade union leader between the 1940s to 1960s. He was General-Secretary of a Marine Workers Union. In the 1963, he was Vice President of the United Labour Congress.

In the 1950s, Beyioku worked as a trade union leader and politician. In 1951, he unsuccessfully contested a regional House of Assembly seat in Lagos under the banner of H.O. Davies Nigerian Peoples Congress. He was a nominated member of Senate in 1966, prior to the takeover of government by the military. Having lost a leg in 1967, he devoted his effort to Ifa and Orunmila religion.
