= Abiodun Tobun =

Nigerian politician

Hon. Abiodun Mustainu Tobun

Member, Lagos State House of Assembly
- Incumbent
- Assumed office 2011
- Constituency: Epe Constituency I

Personal details
- Born: May 29, 1963 (age 63)
- Party: All Progressives Congress (APC)
- Spouse: Alhaja Adenike Tobun
- Education: Lagos State Polytechnic (HND) Lagos State University (MBA, MLS)
- Occupation: Politician, Administrator
- Website: Lagos Assembly Profile

Abiodun Mustainu Tobun (born 1963) is a Nigerian politician and administrator who currently serves as a member of the Lagos State House of Assembly, representing Epe Constituency I under the platform of the All Progressives Congress (APC).

== Early life and education ==
Abiodun Tobun was born in 1963 the Epe Division of Lagos State. He began his primary education at St. Theresa Primary School, Epe (1970–1976), and proceeded to Epe Grammar School for his secondary education (1977–1982).

He pursued higher education at Lagos State Polytechnic, Ikorodu, where he studied Agricultural Economics and Extension Management, obtaining a Higher National Diploma (HND) with Upper Credit in 1990. He later furthered his education at Lagos State University (LASU), earning a Master of Business Administration (MBA) with a specialization in Human Resources Management in 1999, and subsequently a Master in Legal Studies (MLS) in 2003.

== Career ==
=== Civil Service ===
Before joining active politics, Tobun had a distinguished career in the Lagos State Civil Service. He started as a storekeeper at Epe General Hospital and rose through the ranks in the Local Government Service Commission. He eventually retired voluntarily in 2010 as a Head of Department (HOD) for Agriculture, Rural and Social Development to pursue a career in politics.

During his civil service years, he was an active unionist, serving as the Branch Chairman of the Nigeria Union of Local Government Employees (NULGE) for Alimosho Local Government and later as the first management staff to become a NULGE Chairman in Lagos State.

=== Political Career ===
Tobun was first elected into the Lagos State House of Assembly in 2011 to represent Epe Constituency I. He has been re-elected in three subsequent elections (2015, 2019, and 2023), making him a fourth-term serving member of the Assembly.

Over his legislative tenure, he has held several key leadership positions:

- 2011–2015: Chairman, House Committee on Environment.
- 2015–2023: Chairman, House Committee on Works and Infrastructure.
- 2023–Present: Chairman, House Committee on Commerce, Trade, Investment, and Cooperative.

In 2023, prior to the inauguration of the 10th Assembly, Tobun declared his intention to run for the Speakership of the House, emphasizing the need for a change in leadership, though the incumbent Speaker, Mudashiru Obasa, was eventually re-elected.

== Awards and Recognition ==
Hon. Tobun holds several traditional titles, including the Balogun of Epe Land, a title conferred upon him by the traditional rulers of Epe Kingdom in recognition of his contributions to the development of the division.
