= Abdulwaheed =

Abdulwaheed is both a given name and a surname. Notable people with the name include:

- Abdulwaheed Afolabi (born 1991), Nigerian footballer
- Abdulwaheed Omar, Nigerian trade union leader
- Hafsat Abdulwaheed (born 1952), Nigerian writer
