= National Union of Hotels and Personal Services Workers =

The National Union of Hotels and Personal Services Workers (NUHPSW) is a trade union representing hospitality workers and those in related fields in Nigeria.

The union was founded in 1978, when the Government of Nigeria merged the following unions:

- Cafe de Chinese Catering and Restaurant Workers' Union
- Federal Place Hotel African Workers' Union
- Food and Drinks Workers' Union of Nigeria
- Hotels Presidential Workers' Union
- Lagos Airport Hotel Workers' Union
- Niger Gondola Hotels Workers' Union
- Nigerian Catering Co. Ltd. Workers' Union
- Nigerian Hotels African Workers' Union
- Nigerian Union of Catering Hotels and Allied Workers' Union
- Nigerian Union of Hotels, Restaurant and Night Club Workers
- Nigerian Union of Housekeepers, Cooks, Maids, Stewards and Related Workers
- South-Eastern State Catering Hotels and Allied Workers' Union
- Taj Mahal Hotel and Allied Workers' Union
- Western State Canteen Workers' Union

In 1978, the union was a founding an affiliate of the Nigeria Labour Congress. It had 30,000 members in both 1988 and 1995. From 1992 until 1997, it had a dispute with the Nigeria Union of Petroleum and Natural Gas Workers (NUPENG) over which union should organise catering staff who worked for oil companies. Although courts rules in the NUHPSW's favour, workers in the sector preferred to remain part of NUPENG, and the NUHPSW did not ultimately expand into the area.
