= Nzeribe =

Nzeribe is a surname. Notable people with the surname include:

- Arthur Nzeribe (1938–2022), Nigerian politician
- Gogo Chu Nzeribe (died 1967), Nigerian trade unionist
- Sambasa Nzeribe, Nigerian actor, model, and entertainer
