= Pascal Bafyau =

- Born: 1947
- Died: 2012 (aged 64–65)
- Occupation: Union Leader
- Notable work: The third president of the Nigerian Labour Congress

Pascal Bafyau (1947–2012) was a Nigerian trade unionist and the third president of the Nigerian Labour Congress, he led the union from 1988 to 1994, succeeding Ali Chiroma. Bafyau passed through the National Institute of Policy and Strategic Studies, Kuru and was also a nominated member of the 1986 Political Bureau.

== Life of bafyau ==
Bafyau attended the School of Agriculture at kabba but his studies was cut before completion when as leader of a student group, he was involved in a riot at the school. A year later in 1967, he was employed by the Nigerian Railway Corporation (NRC). It was at NRC that he became active in the labour union movement, he joined Railway Permanent Ways Workers Union and then the Nigeria Union of Railwaymen. Bafyau rose to become the latter's secretary-general, representing the union in the national labour congress, and then becoming the congress' vice-president and then president. In 1988, factionalism split NLC into two divisions resulting in acrimony, the federal military government then suspended the leadership paving the way for new elections. Bafyau was elected president and inaugurated in December 1988. One of the noteworthy decisions taken during his tenure was a plan to build a twelve-storey labour house in Abuja.

Bafyau was not only involved in trade unionism but was an active participant in the democratic process during the Third Republic, he was a member of the Constituent Assembly of 1987 and went on to organize a labour party which was proscribed by military president, Babangida. Members of the party then realigned with the Social Democratic Party. In 1993, Bafyau tried to convince Abiola, who was the party's choice for the presidency to select him as a vice presidential candidate. Abiola chose Kingibe instead but the election result was suspended prior to announcement. A political crisis then sprang up with NLC condemning the annulment and plans to conduct a new presidential election. Between August 1993 and December 1993, Bafyau's NLC was involved in two major national strikes, the first was in protest against increase in fuel prices and also dissatisfaction with the choice of an interim government. The strike lasted three days before it was suspended after the government called for dialogue. Two months later the government further increased fuel prices leading NLC to forgo dialogue and return to protest with the declaration of a second national strike. This strike later collapsed after a change in government.

In 1994, during the political crisis that spilled over from the annulment of the June 12 presidential elections, Bafyau was involved in negotiations with the military regime of Sani Abacha. He met and negotiated a deal with Abacha to release the jailed politician, MKO Abiola, the presumed winner of the election. Bafyau secured a conditional bail release predicated on Abiola not traveling abroad, holding political rallies and keeping peace but the conditions of the bail was rejected by Abiola. His negotiations with the government also earned him criticism from some activist who inferred he was working with the military government. In addition, his leadership of the labour congress was perceived as non-committal to the actualization of Abiola's presidency and many of his projects such as a labour transportation project, labour headquarters and endowment fund benefited largely from government funding.
