= Nigerian general strike =

Nigerian general strike may refer to:

- 1945 Nigerian general strike
- 2024 Nigerian general strike
