= Professional E-Hailing Drivers and Private Owners Association =

Trade union federation in Nigeria

PEDPA
- Founded: 25 August 2020
- Headquarters: Flat A4 Kay's Court Apartment; Addo Road; Ajah, Lekki Eti-Osa; Lagos State
- Location: Nigeria
- Members: 5,000
- Key people: Idris Shonuga, President
- Affiliations: TUC
- Website: pedpa.org

The Professional E-Hailing Drivers and Private Owners Association (PEPDA) is a trade union federation of ridesharing and other gig transport workers. In Nigeria, these workers primarily work for Uber and Bolt. The federation is affiliated with the Trade Union Congress of Nigeria.

== History ==
PEPDA was founded in August 2020. The immediate reasons for the creation of the federation were confiscations of drivers' vehicles by police in order to gain a negotiating advantage over the transport companies, as well as a sharp rise in inflation. The union criticised the business practices of transport companies and urged them to register with state authorities.

In October 2020, PEPDA announced a strike against drivers shouldering the competition between transport companies. The strike was suspended in reaction to the security chaos caused by the End SARS protests, citing fears of police retribution. The union also called for constructive dialogue to solve the problems at the root of the protests.

In April 2021, PEPDA conducted a strike against Uber's and Bolt's competitive pricing. The union began a one-week strike on April 19, demanding a reduction of the companies' commission from 25 to 10 percent and consultation in future pricing decisions. On April 20, police arrested five PEPDA-affiliated drivers, including union president Idris Shonuga, in Surulere. Police stated that the drivers were not arrested due to taking part in the strike, but due to blocking a road. PEPDA alleged that transport companies had been involved in the arrest. In May, Uber raised its prices in Nigeria.
