= National Union of Chemical, Footwear, Rubber, Leather and Non-Metallic Employees =

The National Union of Chemical, Footwear, Rubber, Leather and Non-Metallic Employees (NUCFRLANMPE) is a trade union representing workers in various industries in Nigeria.

The union was founded in 1996, when the Government of Nigeria merged the weak Footwear, Leather and Rubber Products Workers' Union of Nigeria with the strong National Union of Chemical and Non-Metallic Products Workers. Like both its predecessors, it affiliated to the Nigeria Labour Congress. The union had about 40,000 members in 2013, but following job losses in the industry, by 2018 it had only 20,000 members.

== Presidents ==
1996: Lucas Damulak
2000: Gbadebo Moses Ajibade
2005: Boniface A. Isok
2016: Babatunde Olatunji
2024: Bolarinwa Sunday
