= Steel and Engineering Workers' Union of Nigeria =

The Steel and Engineering Workers' Union of Nigeria (SEWUN) is a trade union representing factory workers involved in making metal and electrical goods in Nigeria.

The union was founded in 1996, when the Government of Nigeria merged the Metal Products Workers' Union of Nigeria with the Iron and Steel Workers' Union of Nigeria, the Automobile, Boatyards, Transport and Equipment and Allied Workers' Union of Nigeria, and the Precision Electrical and Related Equipment Workers' Union. It affiliated to the Nigeria Labour Congress (NLC).

From the late 1990s, the union's leadership was divided into two factions, something which the International Metalworkers' Federation attempted to resolve in 2009. At that time, the union had 28,000 members, but had only 45 employees.

In 2016, the union left the NLC to become a founding constituent of the United Labour Congress (ULC). However, in 2020, the whole ULC rejoined the NLC.
