= National Union of Banks, Insurance and Financial Institution Employees =

The National Union of Banks, Insurance and Financial Institution Employees (NUBIFIE) is a trade union representing workers in the finance industry in Nigeria.

The union was founded in 1978, when the Government of Nigeria merged nine unions:

- Bank of the North Staff Union
- British American Insurance Workers' Union of Nigeria
- Co-operative Union of Western Nigeria Ltd. Staff Association
- Ekiti-Joint Co-operative Movement Staff Union
- National Insurance Corporation of Nigeria Workers' Union
- Nigerian Union of Banks, Insurance and Allied Workers
- Royal Exchange Assurance Staff Union
- United Dominions Corporation and Allied Workers' Union of Nigeria
- Western Nigeria Finance and Agricultural Credit Corporation Workers' Union

The union affiliated to the Nigeria Labour Congress. It had 69,613 members in 1988, and 80,000 by 1995. In 2016, the union left the NLC to become a founding constituent of the United Labour Congress (ULC). However, in 2020, the whole ULC rejoined the NLC.
