= Gbenga Komolafe =

Nigerian lawyer and engineer (born 1963)

1st Commission Chief Executive of the Nigerian Upstream Petroleum Regulatory Commission (NUPRC)
- In office September 2021 – 15 December 2025
- Succeeded by: Oritsemeyiwa Eyesan

Personal details
- Born: Gbenga Komolafe; 26 September 1963 (age 63) Igbara-Oke, Nigeria
- Education: University of Ilorin; University of Ibadan; University of Benin
- Profession: Engineer

Gbenga Olu Komolafe (born 1963) is a Nigerian engineer, lawyer and petroleum and gas industry expert who served as the inaugural commission chief executive (CE) of the Nigerian Upstream Petroleum Regulatory Commission (NUPRC) from September 2021 to December 2025.

== Background and education ==
Gbenga Komolafe was born in 1963 in Igbara-Oke, Ifedore Local Government Area of Ondo State, Nigeria. He had his primary and secondary education in Ondo State before proceeding to University of Ilorin, where he earned a bachelor's degree in engineering in 1987.

He earned a master's degrees in industrial and labour relations (M.I.L.R.) in 1995 and industrial and production engineering in 1998 from the University of Ibadan before enrolling at the University of Benin where he earned a law degree in 2006.

Komolafe attended Nigerian Law School, Bwari, Abuja, and was called to the Nigerian Bar in 2008. He attended International Petroleum Management Certificate Programme, Boston, and International Gas Business Management Certificate Programme, Offshore Training Conference (OTC), Houston, Texas. Komolafe is a member of the Nigerian Bar Association and a Fellow of Nigerian Society of Engineers and Council of Registered Engineers of Nigeria (COREN).

== Career ==
Komolafe was an executive director at the Pipelines and Petroleum Marketing Company (PPMC) between 2012 and 2014. He was also a general manager at the Petroleum Equalization Fund and the Petroleum Products Pricing Regulatory Agency (PPPRA) respectively.

=== NUPRC ===
After the Petroleum Industry Act (PIA) came into force in 2021, President Muhammadu Buhari nominated Komolafe as the inaugural chief executive officer of the Nigerian Upstream Petroleum Regulatory Commission and was confirmed by the Senate in September same year.

He introduced several policies focused on advancing the use of technology in the operation of Nigeria's upstream oil and gas sector. He also established Nigerian Upstream Petroleum Measurement Regulations and the Advanced Cargo Declaration Regulation which improved monitoring and accountability.

In December 2025, Nigeria's anti-corruption agency – the Independent Corrupt Practices and Other Related Offences Commission – in its annual Ethics and Integrity Compliance Scorecard (EICS) report for 2025 ranked NUPRC 1st out of 357 ministries, departments and agencies with a score of 91.83.

On 17 December 2025, Komolafe resigned as NUPRC CE and was succeeded by Oritsemeyiwa Eyesan.
