= Marafa Bashir Abba =

Nigerian politician

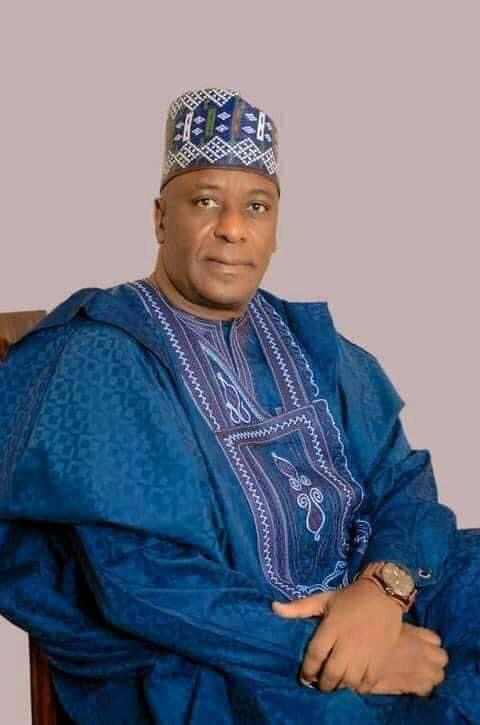

Senator for Taraba Central
- Incumbent
- Assumed office May to November 2015

Deputy Speaker, Taraba State House of Assembly
- In office 2005–2011
- Constituency: Nguroje

Personal details
- Party: All Progressives Congress
- Occupation: Politician, Public Administrator

Marafa Bashir Abba is a Nigerian politician and public administrator from Nguroje, Sardauna Local Government Area of Taraba State, Nigeria. He served in the Taraba State House of Assembly from 2003 to 2011 and was Deputy Speaker from 2005 to 2011. In 2015, he was elected as Senator for Taraba Central in the 8th National Assembly.

Marafa served only for six months, from May to November 2015. He was unseated by the Court of Appeal.

Abba is currently a Federal Commissioner at the Revenue Mobilisation Allocation and Fiscal Commission (RMAFC), following his nomination by President Bola Tinubu and confirmation by the Nigerian Senate.

== Early life and education ==
Abba was born in Nguroje, Sardauna Local Government Area of Taraba State. He attended Central Primary School, Nguroje, and Government Day Secondary School, Jada. He later obtained a Bachelor of Science (B.Sc.) degree in Accountancy from Modibbo Adama University of Technology, Yola (formerly Federal University of Technology, Yola).

== Career ==
Before entering politics, Abba worked with the United Bank for Africa (UBA), where he gained experience in banking and administration.

== Political career ==
Abba was elected to the Taraba State House of Assembly in 2003, representing the Nguroje Constituency. He served as Deputy Speaker from 2005 to 2011.

In 2015, he was elected as Senator representing Taraba Central during Nigeria’s general elections, as listed by the Independent National Electoral Commission.

He also served as Special Adviser on Local Government and Chieftaincy Affairs to the Taraba State Government, and was later appointed Chairman of the Taraba State Tourism Board.

== Appointment to RMAFC ==
In 2025, President Bola Tinubu nominated Abba as a Federal Commissioner in the Revenue Mobilisation Allocation and Fiscal Commission. His nomination and confirmation by the Nigerian Senate were reported by national media including DailyPost Nigeria and Legit.ng.

== Personal life ==
Abba is from Nguroje in Sardauna Local Government Area of Taraba State.
