= National Union of Food, Beverage and Tobacco Employees =

Nigerian trade union

The National Union of Food, Beverage and Tobacco Employees (NUFBTE) is a trade union representing workers in food processing and related industries in Nigeria.

== History ==
The union was founded in 1978, when the government of Nigeria merged the country's many unions into industrial unions.

The unions which merged into the NUFBTE were:

- A. C. Christlieb Associated Companies Workers' Union
- Bacita Allied Sugar Factory Industrial Workers' Union of Nigeria
- Bisco Biscuit Workers' Union
- Cadbury Nigeria Limited African Workers' Union
- Dumex Workers' Union
- Flour Mills of Nigeria Workers' Union
- Food Specialities (Nigeria) Ltd. Workers' Union
- Golden Guinea and Allied Workers' Union
- Guinness Industries Workers' Union of Nigeria
- Karouni Workers' Union
- Lagos and District Bakery Workers' Union
- Lipton Workers' Union of Nigeria
- Narakat Biscuit African Workers' Union
- Niger Biscuit Company Limited and Associated Workers' Union
- Nigeria Canning Company Ltd. Workers' Union
- Nigeria Cocoa Processing and Allied Workers' Union
- Nigerian Breweries African Workers' Union
- Nigerian Sugar Industry Supervisors', Foremen and Allied Workers' Union
- Nigerian Tobacco General Workers' Union
- North Brewery Workers' Union
- Philip Morris (Nigeria) Ltd. Workers' Union
- Tate and Lyle Nigeria Limited Ilorin Factory Workers' Union
- Trebor (Nigeria) Ltd. Workers' Union
- West African Breweries and Associated Companies Workers' Union of Nigeria
- West African Distillers Ltd. African Workers' Union

It affiliated to the Nigeria Labour Congress. By 1988, it had 44,405 members, and this grew to 160,000 by 2005.

== Leadership ==
=== Presidents ===
1979: K. O. Lawrence
1980: Stephen Olubayo Osidipe
1991: Nansel Haruna Mamdam
1995: John Onyenemere
2008: Lateef Idowu Oyelekan
2023: Garba Ibrahim

=== General Secretaries ===
1978: Valentine Awah
1979: Solomon Kunle Oyebanjo
1996: Adebayo Kazeem
2006: Isiaka Gbolagade Yussuf
2009: Bamidele Stephen Busari
2012: Lamidi Ayinla Danjuma
2016: Thomas Terhemba Tyoban
