= Biafran Trade Union Confederation =

Biafran trade union federation

The Biafran Trade Union Confederation (BTUC) was a short-lived national trade union federation in Biafra.

A variety of trade unions operated in eastern Nigeria in the mid-1960s, but the most important was the Eastern Nigerian Trade Union, an affiliate of the United Labour Congress (ULC). In 1967, Biafra declared independence from Nigeria, triggering the Biafran War. The Eastern Nigerian Trade Union re-constituted itself as the Biafran Trade Union Confederation. It was led by Ben Udokporo, formerly the eastern district secretary of the ULC, and he brought into it branches of various other ULC affiliates in the newly declared nation.

The federation was supportive of the Biafran Armed Forces, and its leaders were given positions on President C. Odumegwu Ojukwu's advisory council. After the surrender of Biafra, in 1970, the BTUC was dissolved, and its affiliates sought to affiliate with one of Nigeria's other national trade union federations.
