= Peter Esele =

Nigerian unionist

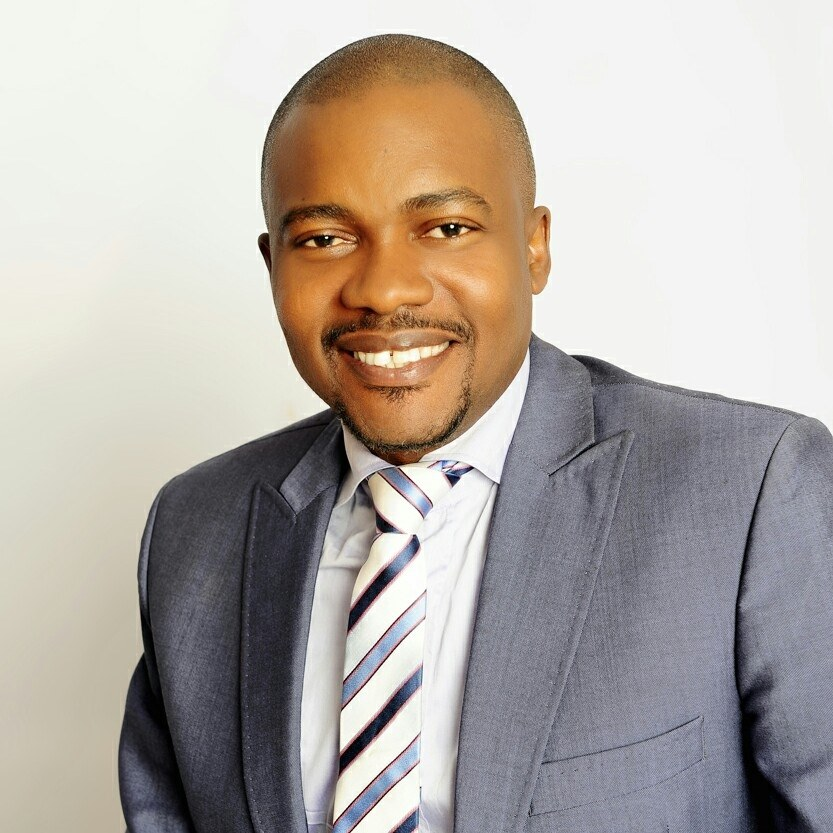
- Born: July 24, 1972 (age 54); Edo State
- Notable work: President of the Petroleum and Natural Gas Senior Staff Association of Nigeria (PENGASSAN)

Peter Esele (born on July 24, 1972, in Edo State, Nigeria) is a unionist. Esele was the president of the Trade Union Congress (TUC) for two terms, from March 2007 to June 2013. He also served as president of the Petroleum and Natural Gas Senior Staff Association of Nigeria (PENGASSAN) from April 2006 to 2008. He was president of the PENGASSAN from December 2005 to April 2006 and was its deputy president from April–December 2005.

Esele was a 2016 Edo gubernatorial aspirant on the All Progressives Congress (APC), who succeed Adams Oshiomhole, the then Governor of the state.

== Education and positions ==
Peter Esele attended Salvation Army Primary School, Agadaga Mixed Secondary School, and Edokpolor Grammar School for his Senior Secondary School Certificate in Benin City. He later obtained a B.A. in Mass Communications from Abia State University, Uturu, Abia State. Peter Esele is an advocate of technical education.

Esele was once a member of the Subsidy Reinvestment Program Committee (SURE-P), the Constitutional Review Committee, the Post Presidential Election Violence Committee, the Nigerian Extractive Industries Transparency Initiative (NEITI), the National Stakeholder Working Group, and a board member of PPPRA. Esele went on to work for an American oil company in Nigeria. He was the Chairman of Profund Properties Nig. Ltd. and director at Trustfund Pensions Plc.

== Political appointments ==
Esele was appointed by former president Goodluck Ebele Jonathan as a member of the SURE-P. He was also on the Constitutional Review Committee that was inaugurated on November 17, 2011, by President G. E. Jonathan. Esele was a member of the 2011 Post Presidential Election Violence Committee and a member of NEITI. He was also appointed by President Jonathan to the National Stakeholder Working Group (NSWG) and as a board member of PPPRA. Diezani Allison-Madueke, former Minister of Petroleum Resources, appointed Peter Esele as a member of Petroleum Industry Bill (PIB) Task Force to further facilitate the quick passage of the bill.

Esele was a delegate at the 2014 National Conference.
