= Dapo Sarumi =

Nigerian politician

Federal Minister for Communication
- In office June 1999 – January 2001
- Succeeded by: Jerry Gana

Personal details
- Born: Epe, Lagos State
- Party: Social Democratic Party

Dapo Sarumi is a Nigerian politician from Lagos State. He was the former minister for Information. In 1991, he contested the Social Democratic Party (Nigeria) gubernatorial primary under the People's Front faction of the SDP led by Shehu Musa Yar'adua, members of the PF included Yomi Edu, Bola Tinubu, Abdullahi Aliyu Sumaila, Abubakar Koko, Babalola Borishade, Umaru Musa Yar'adua, Sabo Bakin Zuwo, and Rabiu Musa Kwankwaso but he was later dis-qualified.

In late 2000, he was involved in a traffic accident and lost two of his ministerial aides."Minister Loses Aides In Road Crash," Panafrican News Agency, December 27, 2000.
