= Radio, Television, Theatre and Arts Workers' Union of Nigeria =

Trade union in Nigeria

The Radio, Television, Theatre and Arts Workers' Union of Nigeria (RATTAWU) is a trade union representing workers in the arts and media industries in Nigeria.

The union was founded in 1977, as the Radio, Television and Theatre Workers' Union, when the Nigerian government merged twelve unions:

- Association of Radio TV Journalists of Nigeria
- East-Central State Broadcasting Service Programme Staff Union
- ECS Broadcasting Service Clerical and Allied Workers' Union
- ECS Broadcasting Service Engineering Staff Union
- NBC Accounts and Audit Staff Association
- NBC Clerical and Allied Workers' Union
- NBC Engineering Workers' Association
- NBC Studio Managers' Association
- Nigerian Actors' and Allied Professional Union
- Rediffusion (Africa) Ltd African Workers
- Secretariat Staff Association of Nigeria
- Western Staff Radiovision Workers' Union

In 1978, the union was a founding affiliate of the Nigeria Labour Congress. By 1988, the union had 80,000 members, but by 2005, it had shrunk to only 7,000 members.
