= Oritsemeyiwa Eyesan =

Nigerian oil and gas executive

Commission Chief Executive, Nigeria Upstream Regulatory Council (NUPRC)
- Incumbent
- Assumed office 19 December 2025
- President: Bola Tinubu
- Preceded by: Gbenga Komolafe

Executive Vice President Upstream, NNPC
- In office September 2023 – November 2024
- Succeeded by: Udobong Ntia

Personal details
- Born: 15 September Edo State, Nigeria
- Education: University of Benin, Nigeria
- Profession: Administrator, Oil and Gas Executive

Oritsemeyiwa Amanorisewo Eyesan (born 15 September) is a Nigerian oil and gas executive and administrator. She is the current Commission Chief Executive of the Nigerian Upstream Regulatory Council (NUPRC). In June 2024, she was appointed as the first female Executive Vice President of the Nigerian National Petroleum Company (NNPC) upstream division.

== Early life and education ==
Eyesan was born in Benin City, Edo State, Nigeria. She studied at the University of Benin where she obtained her first degree in Economics Education in 1986.

== Career ==
Oritsemeyiwa Eyesan began her career in the banking industry in 1989, serving as a branch manager at the defunct People's Bank of Nigeria until 1991. She later joined the defunct Gulf Bank of Nigeria in September 1991 as a treasury officer.

=== Nigerian National Petroleum Company (NNPC) ===
In 1993, she joined NNPC as a material traffic officer. Between July 2019 and November 2022, she worked as the Group General Manager, Corporate Planning & Strategy. In November 2022, she was appointed Chief Strategy Officer following the transformation of NNPC from a state-owned oil and gas business to a commercialised limited liability company operating under Nigeria's Companies and Allied Matters Act (CAMA). In her role as Chief Strategy Officer, Eyesan created the company's sustainability framework, ensuring process and cost efficiency at a time the organisation was experiencing structural changes.

=== Executive Vice President Upstream (2023–2024) ===
Eyesan was appointed executive vice president on 17 September 2023. She oversaw NNPC's oil and gas development, exploration and production activities. During her term, she reduced the contracting cycle from 300 days to 180 days, enabling an optimal operational environment for International Oil Companies (IOC) and joint venture partnerships, a move that contributed to the increase in oil production to 1.7 million barrels per day.

She held the role until November 2024 when she was replaced by Udobong Ntia, following her retirement from NNPC.

=== Nigerian Upstream Regulatory Council (NUPRC) ===
After Gbenga Komolafe stepped down as Commission Chief Executive of the NUPRC on 17 December 2025, Eyesan was nominated by Nigeria's president, Bola Ahmed Tinubu, to replace him. Her nomination received attention from professional and interest groups nationwide, including the Women in Energy Network (WIEN) and the Itsekiri Liberation Frontiers (ILF).

On 18 December 2025, Eyesan appeared before a Nigerian Senate committee led by Senator Kawu Sumaila for screening. Oritsemeyiwa Eyesan's appointment was confirmed by the senate on 19 December 2025.

== Personal life ==
Eyesan is a member of the Society of Petroleum Engineers. She is an Itsekiri woman from Delta State.
