= Nigerian Political Bureau of 1986 =

The Nigerian Political Bureau of 1986 was established by General Ibrahim Babangida shortly after coming to power in the 1985 Nigerian coup d'état. The bureau was inaugurated to conduct a national debate on the political future of Nigeria, and was charged amongst other things to "Review Nigeria’s political history and identify the basic problems which have led to our failure in the past and suggest ways of resolving and coping with these problems." The exercise was the broadest political consultation conducted in Nigerian history.

Before the establishment of the bureau, Nigeria had undergone two major democratic constitutions: the First Nigerian Republic and the Second Nigerian Republic, both replete with institutional failures and overthrown by the military. During the bureau's tenure, it received over 27,000 submissions from Nigerians all over the country, on issues ranging from religion, to ethnicity and ideology. In March 1987, the bureau submitted its final report to the military government of General Babangida with recommendations.

However, the political bureau was seen by some critics as an endeavour to legitimize the military's incursion into politics by basing some of its existence to a return to democratic rule such as open debates and finalizing a return to democracy. In 1987, Newswatch magazine released an unofficial report of the bureau, for its reward, it was proscribed for a few months lending credence to some of the criticisms of the regime, as taking Nigerian on a farcical democratic experiment.

== Members ==
General Babangida announced the names of the seventeen (17) members of the Political Bureau at the inauguration of the bureau in Abuja on January 13, 1986.

- Dr Samuel Joseph Cookey — Chairman
- Abdullahi Augie - Executive Secretary
- Bala Takaya
- Edwin Madunagu (Dr.; Marxist, "self-avowed communist", regular contributor to The Guardian newspapers. Madunagu had first been suspended as university lecturer during the Obasanjo 1979 regime [?], and would later leave the bureau under controversial circumstances. He remains - as at 2011 - a contributor to national issues)
- Oye Oyediran
- Mrs. Hilda Adefarasin
- E.O. Awa
- Tunde Adeniran
- Mrs. R. Abdullahi
- A. D. Yahaya
- Sam E. Oyovbaire (Professor of Political Science & 1984-86 president of the Nigerian Political Science Association - NPSA. Oyovbaire remained a Political Adviser to Babangida, and later, Minister for Information and Culture under the IBB regime. Oyovbaire)
- Ola Balogun (Dr.; Balogun left the bureau in controversial circumstances.
- Haroun Adamu
- Ibrahim Halilu
- O. E. Uya
- Pascal Bafyau - Then leader of the Railways Union. Later became president of the Nigerian Labour Congress, seizing leadership from Ciroma who was leader when Babangida became head of state. He is reported to have had extensive informal networks in Babangida's military regime. Bafyau would later aspire to be Abiola's running-mate in the 1993 elections and would preside over vacillations of the union during the struggle against the annulment of the June 12 elections.
- Sani Zahradeen

== Bureau's recommendations ==
- A unicameral legislature
- Adoption of a two-party state based on certain conditions
- Adoption of a single five-year term for the presidency
- Rejection of the zoning principle
- Leaving traditional rulers out of the political equation: also rejected were diarchy and triarchy (respectively: civilian-military joint, and civilian-military-traditional rulership models). The report stated: "... as regards traditional rulers, we cannot see in which way their inclusion can provide a unifying force... they compete against the nation for allegiance, represent a force against the principle of popular democracy and are dysfunctional reminders of national differences."
- Democratization of socio-economic power through political and economic participation in all structures and organisations of power, leading to a socialist state
- Economic recovery should be predicated on self-reliance, social justice
- Setting aside 10% of elected seats for women and labor leaders
- Mass mobilization as the cornerstone of a newfound political orientation
- The Creation of six more states.

=== Some approved recommendations ===
- Adoption of the Mass Mobilization for Self Reliance, Social Justice, and Economic Recovery
- Adoption of a two-party state with the center-left Social Democratic Party and center-right National Republican Convention
- The political bureau recommended the creation of only two states - Katsina (North) and Akwa Ibom (Niger Delta). General Babangida created Katsina and Akwa-Ibom states in 1987.

=== Some rejected recommendations ===
- A unicameral legislature
- Rejection of the zoning principle
- Five-year single term for the presidency
- Democratization of socio-economic power through political and economic participation in all structures and organisations of power, leading to a socialist state

== Babangida and Nigerian intellectuals ==
The formation of the political bureau was a significant event for many reasons. The composition of the bureau could hardly be faulted as it included men and women of character and learning; it also served as an early move for Babangida to co-opt, cultivate and involve intellectuals in the elaborate Transition to civil rule Programme. In preparation, Babangida released political detainees, repealed the Decree 4 of 1984 and promised to respect fundamental human rights. Within two years of seizing power, Babangida had the support of a large swathe of the country; there were few dissensions. Eventually, when General Babangida's intentions started to become obvious to discerning members of the bureau, only a few of the members took decisive action after what was perceived as a relapse to the military authoritarian tendencies experienced under General Muhammadu Buhari. Edwin Madunagu, a prominent journalist of the liberal newspaper The Guardian, was dropped from the bureau for "extremist" and "uncooperative" views and attitudes. He would later release an unofficial bureau report via Newswatch, Madunagu was then threatened and intimidated by the secret police.

Professor Sam E. Oyovbaire served as special adviser to Admiral Augustus Aikhomu (Aikhomu became Babangida's deputy in October 1986, after fall out with Commodore Ebitu Ukiwe) engaged in rationalising the regime's political programme. Oyovbaire extolled the virtues of the Transition Programme, the National Electoral Commission (NEC), MAMSER (Mass Mobilisation for Self-Reliance Social Justice, and Economic Recovery), SAP (Structural Adjustment Programme - the "home-grown" version implemented by the Babangida regime without the standby facility of the International Monetary Fund). In February 2002, Oyovbaire, along with Chidi Amuta, wrote in defence of Babangida's programmes. By 2002, Oyovbaire could be read defending Babangida's regime: "The socio-economic reforms of the IBB regime created the enabling environment for a generation of Nigerian professionals who were self-reliant, confident and challenged to break new grounds in the Nigerian political economy." and presented Babangida's regime as the "... architect and founder of the process of modernization of the Nigerian political economy..." Regarding the "missing" $12.2 Billion Gulf War oil windfall, Oyovbaaire wrote: "The IBB regime did what it had to do with the dedicated funds. Therefore, the divergence of opinions between the Okigbo committee and the IBB regime on this matter was essentially conceptual and not substantive."

These above appear to confirm the reading of public commentators, including intellectuals and academics, of the success of Babangida's patronage politics. The creation of several programmes maintained a steady income for many academics, even as the programs were rife with the corruption that marked Babangida's regime as exceptional. Members of the political bureau were promised active roles in the implementation of their recommendations; personal loyalty developed as a matter of course. In reference to the Transition Program of General Babangida, Prof. Adebayo Willians in "Intellectuals and the crisis of democratization in Nigeria: Towards a theory of postcolonial anomie" wrote: "A substantial faction of the intellectual class is implicated in this democratic debacle, and its behaviour provides rich insights into the dynamics of intellectual affiliations in a neopatrimonial military state."

By 2010, Oyovbaire had become coordinator for the activities of PDP presidential aspirant, Abubakar Atiku. Oyovbaire has also co-authored a book "Portrait of a New Nigeria Leader: Selected Speeches of IBB" (Tunji Olagunju and Sam Oyovabaire). In the preface, Adele Jinadu wrote: "President Babangida's enunciation of human rights as a cardinal aspect of his regime is not merely accidental or an opportunistic rationalisation to take advantage of the opprobrium in which the Buhari regime was held and thereby win popular acclaim. Rather it runs deep in his liberal and populist convictions and is based on a reasoned and well-thought out conceptualisation of the military role in African politics". Jinadu, another Nigerian intellectual, appears blind to - as Williams would write - the "unprecedented and well-documented assault on human rights by the Babangida government".

In 2010, when Babangida had again nursed the ambition of contesting for the presidency, Professor Oyovbaire had been named as his "Director of Policy and Strategy". In December 2010, when Badangida had been ruled out of the 2011 elections, Oyovbaire had been reported as the head of the Abubakar Atiku campaign for the presidency in the South-South; this followed the "harmonization process of the Babangida, Gusau, Atiku and Saraki Campaign Teams in the South-South following the adoption of Atiku Abubakar as the consensus Candidate by the Ciroma led wise men from the North ...". Oyovbaire's high opinion of Babangida could be contrasted with the assessment of two other scholars. In the assessment of Rotimi and Julius Ihonvbere: "Babangida’s Character... left much to be desired. He was corrupt, manipulative, unpredictable, ambitious, unreliable and uninterested in leaving office."
