= Labour Unity Front =

Trade union federation

The Labour Unity Front (LUF) was a national trade union federation in Nigeria.

The federation was established in 1963 by Michael Imoudu and Gogo Chu Nzeribe, who had recently been removed from the leadership of the Nigeria Trade Union Congress (NTUC). It brought together 22 non-affiliated trade unions, and had the stated purpose of bringing about a unification of the three existing trade union federations: the NTUC, United Labour Congress (ULC) and Nigeria Workers' Council (NWC). This proved impossible, but the LUF continued as an additional federation, unaligned with any political party or international bodies.

In 1968, the LUF absorbed the small Northern States Federation of Labour. In 1978, it was finally able to merge with its three larger rivals, to form the Nigeria Labour Congress.
