= Amalgamated Union of Public Corporation, Civil Service Technical and Recreational Services Employees =

The Amalgamated Union of Public Corporation, Civil Service Technical and Recreational Services Employees (AUPCTRE) is a trade union representing public sector workers in Nigeria.

The union was founded in 1996, when the government of Nigeria merged the Civil Service Technical Workers' Union with the National Union of Public Corporations and the Recreational Services Employees' Union. Like all its predecessors, it affiliated to the Nigeria Labour Congress, and by 2005 it had 85,000 members.

== Presidents ==
1996: D. A. Adekola
2000: Mike Amaike
2004: Iliasu Boyi
2006: Emmanuel Ajoku
2013: Benjamin Anthony
