= Ayuba Wabba =

Nigerian Trade Union Leader

National President of the Nigeria Labour Congress
- In office February 2015 – February 2023
- Preceded by: Abdulwaheed Omar
- Succeeded by: Joe Ajaero

President International Trade Union Confederation
- In office 2018–2022
- Preceded by: João Antonio Felicio
- Succeeded by: Akiko Gono

Personal details
- Born: 22 October 1968 (age 57) Borno State, Nigeria
- Education: Masters Degree
- Alma mater: Imo State University
- Occupation: Activism; Union Leader

Ayuba Philibus Wabba (born 22 October 1968) is a Nigerian trade union leader who served as the President of the Nigeria Labour Congress from 2015 to 2023. In 2018, he was elected president of International Trade Union Confederation, a position he held till 2022.

== Early life and education ==
Born in Borno State, Wabba attended school in Kawo, and then various institutions including the Imo State University. During this period, he served as president of the National Union of Health Technology Students.

== Career ==
After completing his education, Wabba served in the Medical and Health Workers' Union of Nigeria, first as its secretary in Borno State and later as the union's national president. In 2007, he was elected national treasurer of the Nigeria Labour Congress, and in 2015, he became its president. In 2018, he was elected president of the International Trade Union Confederation. Wabba opposes Nigeria's participation in the African Continental Free Trade Area.

Wabba is also the Fiwagboye of Orile-Ifo and the Zanna Ma'alama of Borno Emirate. In one of his struggles with the government, the governor of Kaduna State declared him wanted, along with other NLC officials, for alleged economic sabotage and attack on public infrastructure in the state. In response, Wabba stated that he was waiting to be arrested by the government and that the five-day strike was not about him but about the welfare of the workers in Kaduna State. Workers from different ministries and cadres of the civil service joined in the protest, withdrawing their services for five days due to a shortage of civil servants in the public service in the state after some of them were sacked by the state government.

Trade union offices
Preceded by Abdulwaheed Omar	President of the Nigeria Labour Congress; 2015–2023	Succeeded by Joe Ajaero
Preceded by João Antonio Felicio	President of the International Trade Union Confederation; 2018–2022	Succeeded by Akiko Gono
