= National Union of Civil Engineering, Construction, Furniture and Wood Workers =

The National Union of Civil Engineering, Construction, Furniture and Wood Workers (NUCECFWW) is a trade union representing workers in various related industries in Nigeria.

The union was formed in 1996, when the Nigerian government merged the Nigeria Union of Construction and Civil Engineering Workers with the National Union of Furniture, Fixtures and Woodworkers. Like both its predecessors, it affiliated to the Nigeria Labour Congress, and by 2005 it had 62,000 members.
