= United Labour Congress (2016) =

The United Labour Congress (ULC) was a national trade union federation bringing together unions in Nigeria.

The federation was founded on 18 December 2016, by about 25 unions which had formerly been affiliated to the Nigeria Labour Congress (NLC). They argued that the leaders of the NLC had become detached from the concerns of their members and, in some cases, were using anti-democratic measures to remain in position. The NLC adopted a conciliatory approach, stating that it would still offer protection to the unions which had formed the ULC. In July 2020, the ULC rejoined the NLC. ULC president Joe Ajaero became vice-president of the NLC.

== Affiliates ==
The federation's affiliates included:

Union	Abbreviation
Academic Staff Union of Research Institutions	ASURI
Association of Nigeria Aviation Professionals	ANAP
Chemical and Non-Metallic Products Senior Staff Association of Nigeria	CANMPSSAN
Fitters Senior Staff Association of Nigeria	FISSAN
Iron and Steel Senior Staff Association of Nigeria	ISSSAN
Metal Products Senior Staff Association of Nigeria	MEPROSSAN
National Association of Aircraft Pilots and Engineers	NAAPE
National Union of Banks, Insurance and Financial Institutions Employees	NUBIFIE
National Union of Electricity Employees	NUEE
Nigeria Union of Mine Workers	NUMW
Nigeria Union of Petroleum and Natural Gas Workers	NUPENG
Nigeria Union of Railwaymen	NUR
National Union of Shop and Distributive Employees	NUSDE
Precision, Electrical and Related Equipment Senior Staff Association	PRESESSA
Steel and Engineering Workers' Union of Nigeria	SEWUN
