= National Association of Nigeria Nurses and Midwives =

The National Association of Nigeria Nurses and Midwives (NANNM) is a trade union representing nurses and midwives in Nigeria. The current serving president of the association is Haruna Mamman

== History ==
The union was founded on 8 December 1977, when the Government of Nigeria merged the Nigerian Nurses' Association with the Nigerian Association of Nurse Anaesthetists. The Professional Association of Trained Nurses of Nigeria, Professional Association of Midwives of Nigeria, Professional Association of Public Health Nurses, Psychiatric Nurses Association and Industrial Nurses Association also joined the new union.

The union affiliated to the Nigeria Labour Congress, and by 1988 it had 50,000 members. It grew to 100,000 members by 1995, and 125,000 by 2005.

== Leadership ==
=== Presidents ===
1977: Hanatu Omole
1982: Josephine A. U. Anyamene
1986: Job Micah
1992: Abdulsalami A. Shiru
1993: Lawrence O. Awowoyin
2000: Pat Emembolu Eze
2004: Linus Abdukadir Sabulu
2006: Lawal Hussaini Dutsinma
2012: Abdrafiu Alani Adeniji
2019: Deborah Yusuf

=== General Secretaries ===
1978: Moses A. Olabode
1992: Moses Ahura Matu
Samson Bolawale
George M. Ayua
W. G. Yusuf-Badmus
2015: Thomas Shettima
