= Akiko Gono =

Trade unionist

President of the International Trade Union Confederation
- Incumbent
- Assumed office 2022
- Preceded by: Ayuba Wabba

Personal details
- Born: 1954/1955 Yokohama, Japan
- Education: Tokyo University of Science

Akiko Gono (Japanese: 郷野晶子; born 1954 or 1955) is a Japanese trade unionist.

Born in Yokohama, Gono studied at the Tokyo University of Science before becoming a computer programmer. In her spare time, she studied English, and on the suggestion of a teacher at the language school, she found work with the Zensendomei trade union. She rose to become director of the union's international affairs bureau, and from 1998 was secretary of the Textile Workers' Asian Regional Organization.

In 2016, Gono was elected as the vice-president of the Japanese Federation of Textile, Chemical, Commerce, Food and General Services Workers' Unions, successor of Zensendomei. She also became general secretary of the IndustriAll Japan Liaison Council. In 2017, she became a member of the workers' group of the governing body of the International Labour Organization, while in 2022 she became an international representative of the Japanese Trade Union Confederation.

In 2022, Gono was elected as president of the International Trade Union Confederation, the first Japanese person to hold the post.

Trade union offices
Preceded by Ayuba Wabba	President of the International Trade Union Confederation; 2022–present	Succeeded by Incumbent
