= Agricultural and Allied Employees' Union of Nigeria =

The Agricultural and Allied Employees' Union of Nigeria (AAEUN) is a trade union representing agricultural workers in Nigeria.

The union was founded in 2008, when the Agricultural and Allied Workers' Union of Nigeria (AAWUN) merged with the Agricultural and Allied Senior Staff Association. Like both its predecessors, it affiliated to the Nigeria Labour Congress. Some AAWUN members disagreed with the merger and continued operating a separate union. In 2018, the two unions attempted to merge under the name "Agricultural and Allied Union of Nigeria", but this was not approved by the Registrar of Trade Unions. In 2019, the AAWUN finally merged into the AAEUN.
