= Hassan Sunmonu =

Nigerian trade unionist

- Born: Akim-Eshiem, Ghana
- Occupation: Union Leader
- Notable work: President of the Nigerian Labour Congress from 1978 to 1984; He is a former General-Secretary of the Organisation of African Trade Union Unity

Hassan Adebayo Sunmonu is a Nigerian trade unionist who was president of the Nigerian Labour Congress from 1978 to 1984. He is a former General-Secretary of the Organisation of African Trade Union Unity.

== Life ==
Sunmonu was born in the village of Akim-Eshiem, Ghana to Nigerian parents. He has an identical twin brother named Hussein, and they both worked with the Federal Ministry of Works in the 1960s. Sunmonu briefly attended a primary education in Ghana before following his paternal grandmother and mother back to Nigeria where they settled at Osogbo. In Osogbo, he attended Ansar Ud Deen, Osogbo (1948-1950), All Saints School, Osogbo and then Osogbo Grammar School (1955). As a young student, he and his twin met Alake Ladapo Ademola who was then in exile in Osogbo. Ademola later sponsored his trip to Ghana after he quit school due to lack of support in paying the school fees. Sunmonu stayed in Ghana in 1956 before moving back to Nigeria a year later. In 1957 he gained admission into a technical school in Yaba later earning a certificate in 1961. Sunmonu completed his education with a diploma in civil engineering from Yaba College of Technology. During his final year at Yaba College, he was president of the college's student union, an executive member of the National Union of Nigerian Students and member of the Muslim Students Society of Nigeria.

Sunmonu joined the civil service in 1961 working for the Federal Ministry of Works and Surveys as a technical officer. His first assignment was working on the Zaria-Kano road. Sunmonu later became the General Secretary of the Association of Technical Officers within the Ministry.

=== Union activities ===
In 1969, he became the Second Assistant Secretary of the Wahab Goodluck led Public Works Aerodrome Technical and General Works' Union. In 1974, he became the union's president.

Sunmonu was elected president of the newly formed Nigerian Labour Congress in 1978. Before the union's formation, the Obasanjo government had disbanded four national labour centers, including the moderate United Labour Congress led by Haroun Adebola and the more radical Nigeria Trade Union Congress. As labour leader, Sunmonu's NLC presented a Charter of Demands that among other things sought the institutionalization of a national minimum wage and minimum pension scheme. To press the government to approve its demand, NLC embarked on a national strike in May 1981. Shagari's administration subsequently reached a compromise with the union.

== Sources ==
- Sunmonu, Hussein (2016). Carry On My Boys: The Story of Identical African Twins. BookBaby. ISBN 9781495189319.
