= National Union of Postal and Telecommunication Employees =

The National Union of Postal and Telecommunication Employees (NUPTE) is a trade union representing workers in the communication industry in Nigeria.

The union was founded in 1978, when the Government of Nigeria merged seven unions:

- Association of Posts and Telegraph Draughtsmen
- P. and T. Clerical and Allied Workers' Union
- P. and T. Telephonists' Union of Nigeria
- Postal Staff Workers' Union of Nigeria
- Posts and Telegraphs Engineering Workers' Union
- Posts and Telegraphs Typists' Stenographers' Union of Nigeria
- Union of Posts and Telecommunication Workers of Nigeria

The union was a founding affiliate of the Nigeria Labour Congress, and by 1988 it had 29,000 members. Its membership rose slightly to 30,000 in 1995, but fell to only 8,000 by 2005.The fall in membership was due to the introduction of Neo-liberal policy of privatization by the government. The sale of NITEL which was a major player and a government owned Telecom Company led to a major decline in membership as the private operators made it difficult for the workers within the sector to be organized into the union.
