= National Union of Shop and Distributive Employees =

The National Union of Shop and Distributive Employees (NUSDE) is a trade union representing workers in the retail and distributive industries in Nigeria.

The union was founded in 1978, when the Government of Nigeria merged the following unions:

- P. Z. African Workers' Union of Nigeria
- U. A. C. and Associated Companies African Workers' Union of Nigeria
- Nigerian Union of Industrial and Mercantile Workers
- C.F.A.O. and Associated Companies African Workers' Union of Nigeria
- National Cash Register Company Workers' Union
- Nigerian Mercantile Technical, Clerical and General Workers' Union
- Konsumas General Workers' Union Atlas
- Nigeria Workers' Union
- Lennards (Lagos) Ltd. African Workers' Union of Nigeria
- J. T. Chanrai and Company (Nigeria) Limited Workers' Union
- Nigerian Mercantile Companies and Allied Union
- Holts African Workers' Union of Nigeria
- G. B. Ollivant and Associated Company African Workers' Union
- K. Chellarams African Workers' Union of Nigeria
- Nigerian Stores Workers' Union
- National Union of Textile, Garment and Tailoring Workers
- Western Nigeria Co-operative Exporters Workers' Union
- Singer Industries and Associated Co. Workers' Union
- Nassar and Sons (Nigeria) Limited Workers' Union
- Nigergas Limited Workers' Union
- J. L. Morrison Sons and Jones (Nigeria) Limited Employees' Union
- Holman Brothers (Nigeria) Limited Workers' Union
- Cneico (Nigeria) Limited Workers' Union
- Wayne (West Africa) Limited Workers' Union
- Nigerian Commercial and Industrial Enterprises Limited African Workers' Union of Nigeria
- Chanrai African Workers' Union
- Dizengof (West Africa) Nigeria Workers' Union
- Union of Pharmaceutical Salesman and Allied Workers of Nigeria
- Stormline D. C. Payne and Associates Workers' Union
- W. F, Clarke and Associated Companies Workers' Union of Nigeria
- Blackwood, Hodge (Nigeria) Ltd. African Workers' Association
- Brian Munro Ltd. and Allied Industries Workers' Union
- Bhojsons Industries Workers' Union
- Kaycee (Nigeria) Limited Workers' Union
- Hamzer and Allied Company Workers' Union of Nigeria
- Witt and Bush Group of Companies Workers' Union of Nigeria
- NAAFCO Workers' Union
- Tradev Workers' Union of Nigeria
- G. B. Holding Ltd. and Associated Cos. African Workers' Union
- 158 Baresel Ltd. African Workers' Union of Nigeria
- U. T. C. African Workers' Union of Nigeria
- S. C. O. A. Workers' Union of Nigeria
- V. Y. B. and Associated Companies African Employees' Union
- Kaycee Nigeria Ltd. African Workers' Union
- Ibru Group of Companies Workers' Union
- Bulkoil Plant of Nigeria Workers' Union
- Major and Company and Associated Companies Workers' Union
- Datrade Polfa and Associated Company Workers' Union

The union was a founding affiliate of the Nigeria Labour Congress (NLC). By 1995, it had about 20,000 members. In 2016, the union left the NLC to become a founding constituent of the United Labour Congress (ULC). However, in 2020, the whole ULC rejoined the NLC.
