= Agricultural and Allied Workers' Union of Nigeria =

Nigerian trade union

The Agricultural and Allied Workers' Union of Nigeria (AAWUN) was a trade union representing workers in the agricultural sector in Nigeria.

The union was established in 1978, when the Nigeria government merged various existing unions:

- Aba Livestock Workers' Union
- Finch and Company (West Africa Limited) Workers' Union
- Ibru Group of Companies Workers' Union of Nigeria
- Ijebu Remo Rubber Plantation Workers' Union
- Ilushin Rubber Estate Workers' Union
- Ilutitun Osoro Oil Palm Estate Workers' Union
- Mid-West Timber Industries Workers' Union
- Mitchell Farms African Workers' Union of Nigeria
- Nigeria Timber Industries Workers' Union
- Nigerian Union of Farm, Plantation, Agricultural and Allied Workers
- Nigerian Union of Sea Fishermen
- Obelawo Farcha Fishing Industry Workers' Union
- Oke-Afa Farms Limited and E. O. Ashamu Group of Companies Workers' Union
- Pest Control Staff Union
- Union of Agricultural Workers of Nigeria
- Western State Agricultural Engineering and Allied Workers' Union
- Western State Association of Professional Agriculturists

The union was a founding affiliate of the Nigeria Labour Congress (NLC), and by 1988, it had 50,000 members. In 2008, it merged with the Agricultural and Allied Senior Staff Association to form the Agricultural and Allied Employees' Union of Nigeria (AAEUN), but a group of union members disagreed with the merger and continued operating under the AAWUN name. In 2018, the two unions attempted to merge under the name "Agricultural and Allied Union of Nigeria", but this was not approved by the Registrar of Trade Unions. In 2019, the AAWUN finally merged into the AAEUN.
