= United Labour Congress =

Trade union federation in Nigeria

The United Labour Congress (ULC) was a national trade union federation in Nigeria.

== History ==
The federation was established in 1962, when the Trade Union Congress of Nigeria merged with the Nigeria Trade Union Congress (NTUC). The federation decided not to align with any particular political party, but to affiliate to the International Confederation of Free Trade Unions. This led the NTUC to withdraw.

The federation was led by president Alhaji Haroun Popoola Adebola and general secretary L. L. Borha. It led the formation of the Joint Action Committee, which campaigned for wage increases for labourers. The selection of delegates to the International Labour Organization in 1962 proved a point of conflict, with N. Anunobi and his supporters splitting away to form the Nigeria Workers' Council (NWC). In 1967, affiliated unions based in Biafra split to form the Biafran Trade Union Confederation.

In 1978, the federation merged with the NTUC, the NWC and the Labour Unity Front, to form the Nigeria Labour Congress.

== Leadership ==
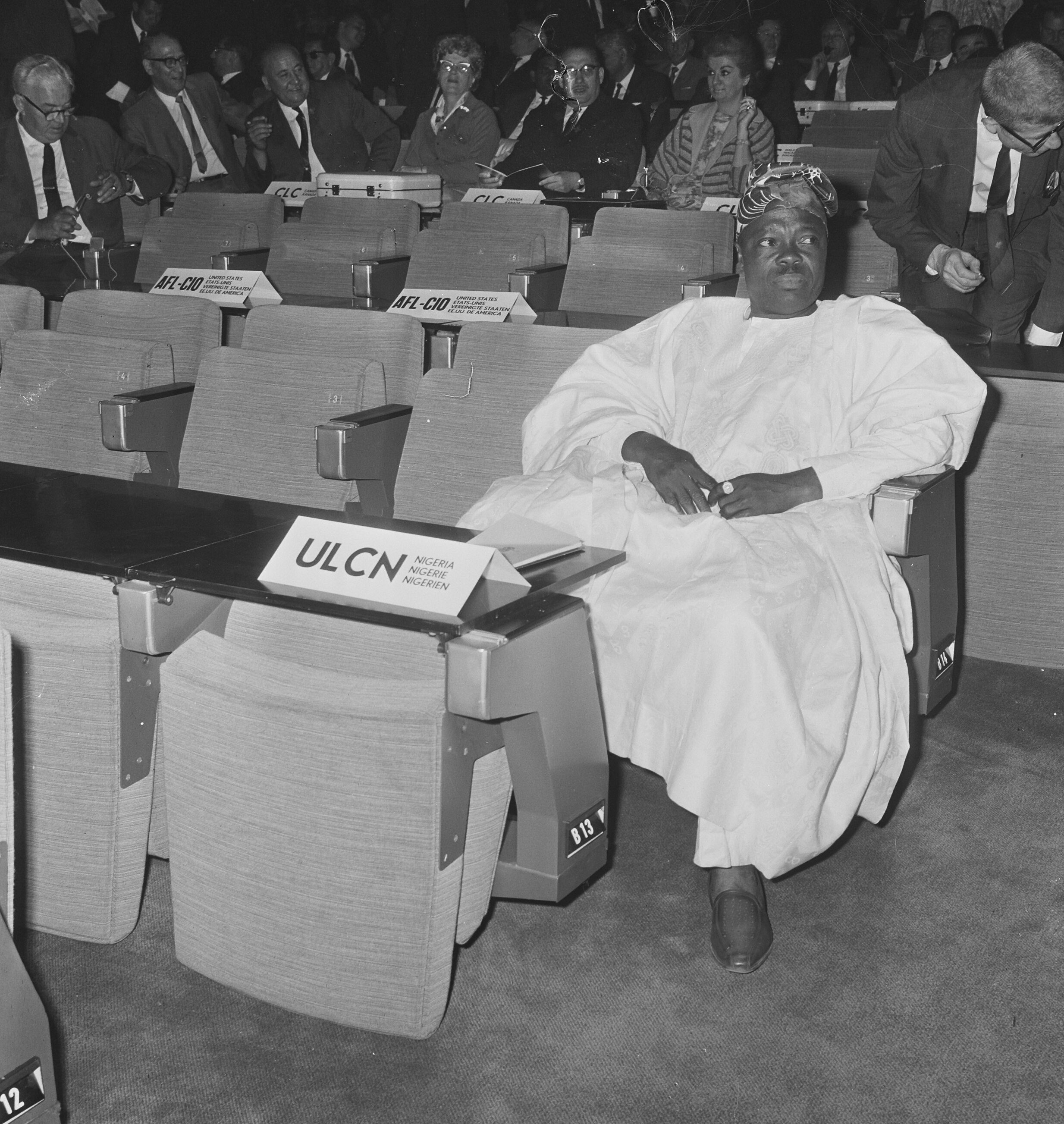
H. P. Adebola in 1965

=== Presidents ===
1962: H. P. Adebola
1971: Yunusa Kaltungo

=== General Secretaries ===
1962: L. L. Borha
1971: E. O. A. Odeyemi
