= Joe Ajaero =

Nigerian journalist and unionist (born 1964)

National President of the Nigeria Labour Congress
- Incumbent
- Assumed office 8 February 2023
- Preceded by: Ayuba Wabba

Personal details
- Born: 17 December 1964 (age 61) Emekuku, Owerri North, Imo State
- Occupation: Journalist

Joe Ajaero (born 17 December 1964) is a Nigerian journalist and trade unionist who is the national president of the Nigerian Labour Congress. He succeeded Ayuba Wabba, who served two terms from 2015 to 2023.

== Early life and education ==
Ajaero was born on 17 December 1964, in Emekuku, Owerri North, Imo State. He obtained a bachelor's degree in education from the University of Nigeria, Nsukka in 1990 and a post graduate diploma in journalism from Times Journalism Institute in 1994. In 1998, he obtained a master's degree in industrial and labour relations from the University of Lagos. He also obtained a law degree from Baze University, Abuja in 2023. In 2003, He obtained a Certificate in Advance Tariff Structuring and Subsidy Design Option from the International Professional Practice Partnership, Cape Town, South Africa. He obtained other certifications from St George's Business School, Cambridge University, Harvard Business School, East and South African Management Institute (2011), and the International Training Centre of the International Labour Organization in Turin, Italy (2009).

== Career ==
Ajaero was a research officer at the One Mechanised Infantry Division Nigerian Army, Kaduna, between 1990 and 1991 for his NYSC. He worked as a reporter/correspondent and assistant news editor at Vanguard from 1992 to 2001 before joining the National Union of Electricity Employees (NUEE) as the Head of Training/Information between 2001 and 2005. In September 2024, the Nigerian State Security Service (SSS) arrested Ajaero, after he criticized the Nigerian government for increasing gasoline prices.
