= Nigeria Civil Service Union =

Trade union representing Nigerian Civil Service workers

The Nigeria Civil Service Union is a trade union representing workers in the Nigerian Civil Service.

The union was founded in 1978, when the government of Nigeria merged the following trade unions:

- Nigerian Civil Service Union
- Ministry of Defence Civil Employees' Union
- East-Central State Messengers' and Allied Workers' Union
- Government Coastal Agency Workers' Union
- Eastern Nigeria Internal Revenue Staff Association
- Eastern Government Stores Workers' Union
- Co-operative Inspectors' Union of Eastern Nigeria
- Eastern Nigeria Bailiffs' Union
- Association of Federal Produce Officers of Nigeria
- Union of Telephone Operators' Attendants ECS
- Civil Service Technical Workers' Union
- Civil Service Technical Workers' Union of Nigeria
- Treasury Workers' Union of Eastern Nigeria
- South-Eastern State Treasury Staff Association
- North-Central State Civil Service Union
- Northern States Civil Service Union
- North-Eastern State Treasury Staff Union
- Federal Statistics Northern States Workers' Union
- Kano State Junior Civil Servants' Association
- Nigerian Federal Office of Statistics Workers' Union
- South-Eastern State Ministry of Education, Non-Teaching Staff and Allied Workers' Union
- Union of Western Nigeria Co-operative Inspectors

The union was a founding affiliate of the Nigeria Labour Congress. By 1988, it had 205,397 members, but by 2005, this had fallen to 100,000. It has had a long-running demarcation dispute with the Association of Senior Civil Servants of Nigeria.
