= Abdulwaheed Omar =

Nigerian former trade union leader

- Born: Zaria
- Occupation: Union Leader
- Notable work: He was also elected as deputy president of the Nigeria Labour Congress (NLC); He joined the Nigeria Union of Teachers, rising to become its president.

Abdulwaheed Ibrahim Omar is a Nigerian former trade union leader.

Born in Zaria, Omar joined the Nigeria Union of Teachers, rising to become its president. He was also elected as deputy president of the Nigeria Labour Congress (NLC). He was re-elected unopposed in 2011. He stood down in 2015.

Trade union offices
Preceded by Adams Oshiomole	President of the Nigeria Labour Congress; 2007–2015	Succeeded by Ayuba Wabba
