= Association of Senior Civil Servants of Nigeria =

Nigerian trade union

The Association of Senior Civil Servants of Nigeria (ASCSN) is a trade union representing staff in the Nigerian Civil Service.

The union was founded in 1978, when the Government of Nigeria merged the Association of Senior Civil Servants with the Eastern Regional Land Surveyors' Union. It has had a long-running demarcation dispute with the Nigeria Civil Service Union.

In 1986, the union affiliated to the loose Senior Staff Consultative Association of Nigeria, and by 1995, it had 60,000 members. In 2005, it was a founding affiliate of the Trade Union Congress of Nigeria. In 2020, Innocent Bola-Audu was elected as the union' president. He was replaced by Tommy Etim Okon in 2021.
