= Nigeria Union of Local Government Employees =

Nigerian trade union

The Nigeria Union of Local Government Employees (NULGE) is a trade union representing municipal workers in Nigeria.

The union was founded in 1978, when the Government of Nigeria merged the following unions:

- Amalgamated Union of County and District Council Labourers of Nigeria
- L. C. C. Mechanical, Clerical and Allied Workers' Union
- Municipal and Local Authorities Workers' Union of Nigeria
- Mushin Town Council Workers' Union
- Nigeria Motor Drivers' Union
- Nigerian Union of Local Authority Staff
- Rivers State Municipal and Local Council Workers' Union
- Sanitary Workers' Union of Nigeria
- Town Planning Authorities Staff Union of Western State of Nigeria
- Western State Conservancy Workers' Union
- Western State Wastes Disposal Employees' Union

The union affiliated to the Nigeria Labour Congress. It had 245,000 members by 1995.
