= Jerry Gana =

Nigerian scholar and statesman

Minister of Co-operation and Integration in Africa
- In office June 1999 – January 2001

Minister of Information and National Orientation
- In office 29 May 2001 – July 2003
- Preceded by: Dapo Sarumi
- Succeeded by: Chukwuemeka Chikelu

Senator
- In office 1983–1983

Personal details
- Born: 30 November 1945 (age 80) Busu Lavun, Niger State, Nigeria
- Party: Social Democratic Party (SDP)
- Spouse: Lucy Tani Gana (m. 1974)
- Children: Grace Lami Gana; Joshua Audu Gana; Elizabeth Sako Yisa (nee Gana); James Boye Gana
- Education: Ahmadu Bello University Zaria, - (B.A (Hon) Upper Division) University of Aberdeen, Aberdeen - (M.Sc., Ph.D) University of London (Postgraduate)
- Website: www.jerrygana.org.ng

Jerry Gana is a Nigerian scholar, politician, and former senator of the Federal Republic of Nigeria, serving briefly in 1983 before becoming Director for the Directorate of Food, Roads and Infrastructure (DFRRI). He was later appointed Director of the Mass Mobilization for Social Justice and Economic Recovery (MAMSER) under Ibrahim Babangida, then Minister of Agriculture and Natural Resources in the Interim National Government under Ernest Shonekan. He later became Minister of Information and Culture under General Sani Abacha, then Minister of Co-operation and Integration in Africa under Olusegun Obasanjo, as well as being Minister of Information and National Orientation. He also served as Political Adviser to Olusegun Obasanjo before announcing plans to run for president in June 2006.

== Background ==
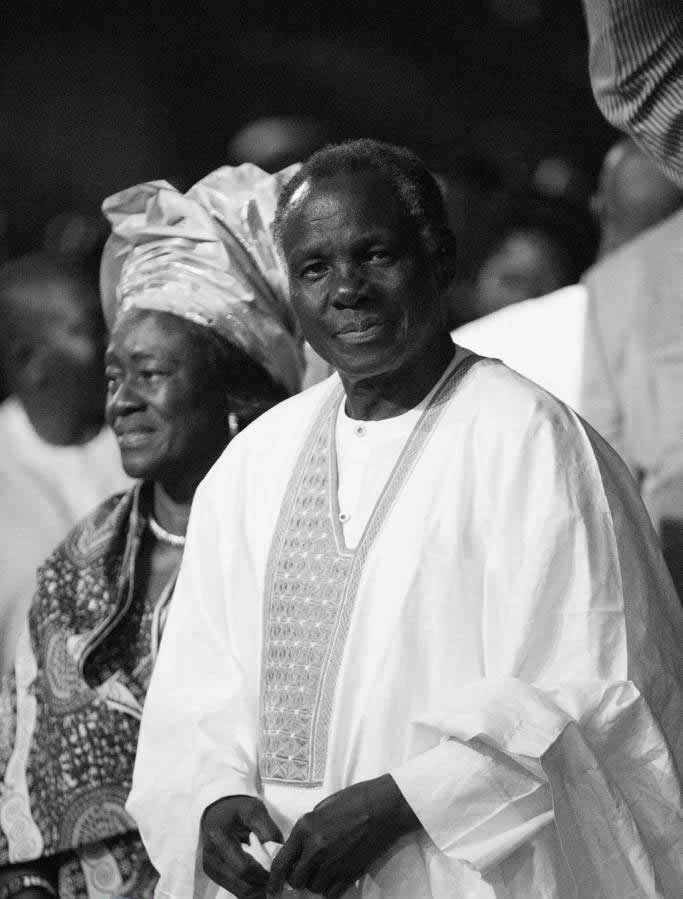
Jerry Gana and wife

Gana was born on 30 November 1945 at Busu near Bida in Niger State. He obtained the West African School Certificate from Government College, Bida in 1964, and proceeded to Okene Secondary School for the Higher School Certificate (H.S.C.) from 1965 to 1966, passing out with distinctions and achieving the best results in 1967. Gana proceeded to Ahmadu Bello University (ABU), Zaria and graduated in 1970 with a B.A. (Hons) degree (Upper Division) in Geography. He then attended King's College of the University of Aberdeen in Scotland for an M.Sc. in Rural Resources Planning, leading to a PhD in Market Place Systems and Rural Development in 1974. He obtained a Certificate of Education from the University of London and taught at Ahmadu Bello University, Zaria from 1974 to 1986, rising to the post of a professor in 1985.

He served as Pro-Chancellor of the University of Lagos until 2017.

== Political career ==
He was elected Senator in 1983, serving briefly until the military coup that brought General Muhammadu Buhari to power. He was appointed chairman of Mass Mobilisation for Social and Economic Recovery under General Ibrahim Babangida's government. He subsequently became a cabinet minister for Agriculture and Natural Resources, Information and Culture, Cooperation and Integration in Africa and again for Information and National Orientation.

Gana ran unsuccessfully for president in 1992 on the Social Democratic Party platform.

== Fourth Republic ==
Gana was the founding national secretary of the Peoples Democratic Party (PDP) in 1998. In June 2001, President Olusegun Obasanjo appointed Gana Minister of Co-operation and Integration in Africa. In January 2001, Obasanjo reassigned his cabinet. In the new cabinet announced in February 2001, Gana was Minister of Information. Gana was also secretary of the PDP Board of Trustees. Gana resigned in July 2006 as special advisor to President Olusegun Obasanjo, and in August 2006 announced he would contend for the PDP candidature for the 2007 presidential elections.

In 2018, Gana announced he would be running as a Social Democratic Party (SDP) candidate for president in the 2019 Elections.
