= Nigeria Union of Railwaymen =

Nigerian rail industry union

The Nigeria Union of Railwaymen (NUR) is a trade union representing workers in the rail industry in Nigeria.

The union was founded in 1978, when the Government of Nigeria merged five unions:

- Association of Locomotive Drivers, Firemen, Yard Staff and Allied Workers' Union
- National Union of Railway Workers of Nigeria
- Nigerian Railway Permanent Way Workers' Union
- Railway and Ports Transport and Clerical Staff Union of Nigeria
- Railway Technical Staff Association of Nigeria

The union was a founding affiliate of the Nigeria Labour Congress, and by 1988, it had 20,634 members. In 2016, the union left the NLC to become a founding constituent of the United Labour Congress (ULC). However, in 2020, the whole ULC rejoined the NLC.
