= Nguroje =

- Town
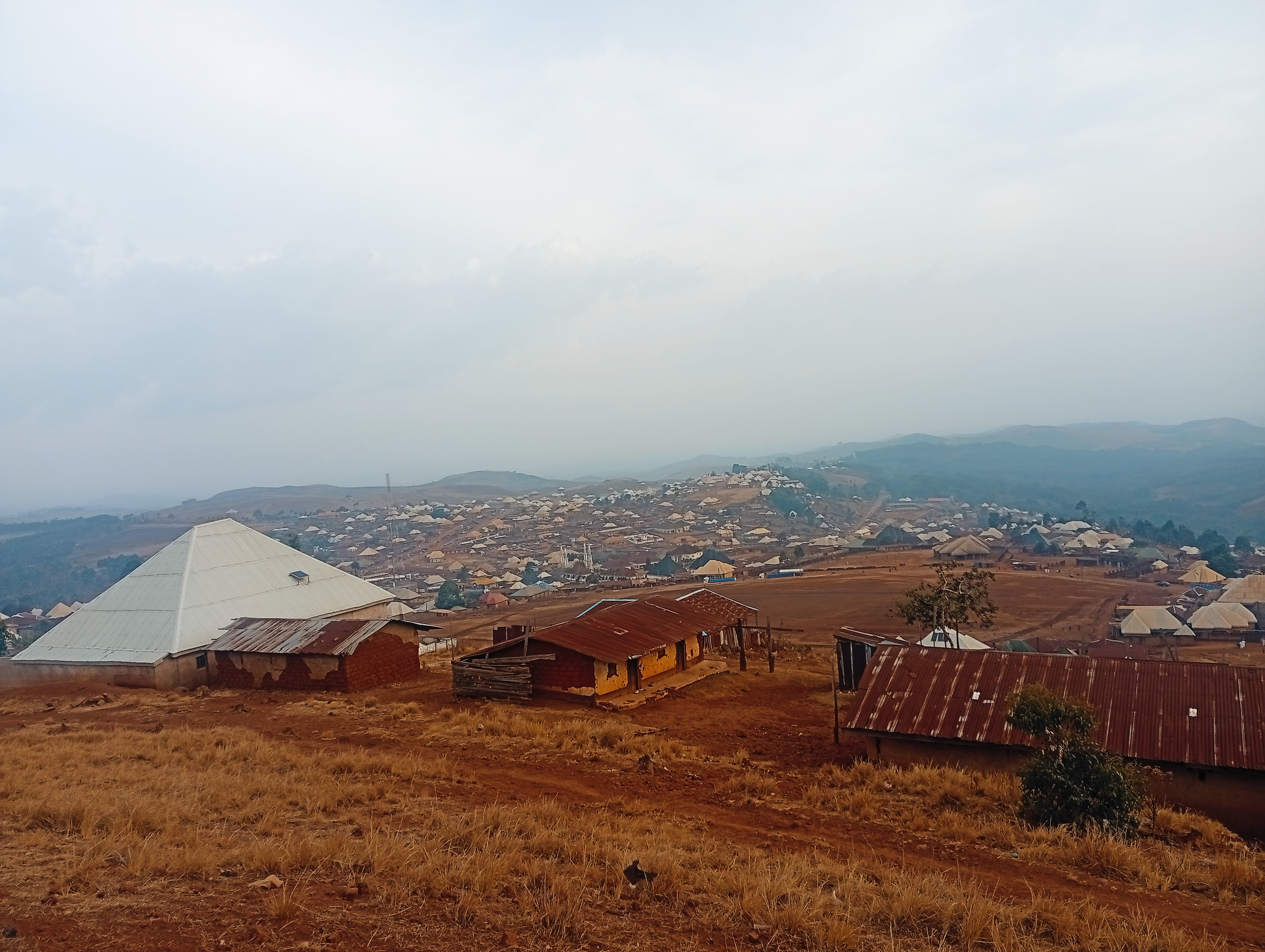
- Nickname: Garin Baban Nana
- Motto: Tudu mai hayakin Shanu
- Location within Nigeria
- Coordinates: 6°57′N 11°7′E
- Country: Nigeria
- State: Taraba State
- LGA: Sardauna

Government
  - Lamdo Nguroje: Lamido Adamu Bairo Nguroje
- Elevation: 1,828 m (5,997 ft)

Population (2006)
  - Total: 200,000
- Time zone: UTC+1 (WAT)

Nguroje is a town found on the Mambilla Plateau, in Sardauna Local Government Area of Taraba State in eastern Nigeria.

== External link ==
https://www.openstreetmap.org/#map=15/6.9575/11.1173
