= MAMSER =

MAMSER was an acronym for Mass Mobilization for Self Reliance, Social Justice, and Economic Recovery. It was an exercise in political orientation in Nigeria undertaken by President Babangida as one of the recommendations of the Political Bureau headed by Dr. Samuel Joseph Cookey. The bureau's task was to consult with thousands of Nigerians and recommend to the Armed Forces Ruling Council, a respectable and methodical transition program. The ruling council also wanted a national orientation to enunciate the abstract ideas in its economic policy and promote value orientation. MAMSER was inaugurated on July 25, 1987.

== Mission ==
A central goal of MAMSER was to cultivate support for the transitional program of the Government. It was also an avenue to educate the citizens about the political process, mobilize them to participate in up-coming elections and political debates, and also inculcate a dependence towards locally made goods and Nigerian products. Some of Mamser's official policies were as follows:

1. Re-orient Nigerians to shun waste and vanity.
2. Shed all pretenses of affluence in their lifestyle,
3. Propagate the need to eschew all vices in public life, including corruption, dishonesty, electoral and census malpractices, ethnic and religious bigotry.

The responsibilities of MAMSER were placed under a directorate, with Jerry Gana as chairman and Ken Saro Wiwa as one of its directors. However, after a few months as a director, Ken Saro Wiwa left the directorate. The directorate however has produced a few notable Nigerians, including Tunde Adeniran, who became the head of the National Orientation Agency, Molara Ogundipe-Leslie, and Jonathan Zwingina, a senator of the Federal Republic of Nigeria.

MAMSER was eventually renamed National Orientation Agency and with a huge presence spanning across all 774 local governments in Nigeria, her current Director General is Alhaji Idi Faruk (MFR) and her headquarters is at Old Secretariat, Area 1 Garki, Abuja.
