= Nigeria Workers' Council =

Nigerian national trade union

The Nigeria Workers' Council (NWC) was a national trade union federation in Nigeria.

The federation was founded in 1962 as a split from the United Labour Congress (ULC), over a dispute about delegate selection for the International Labour Organization congress. It was led by N. Anunobi, with Nnaemeka Chukwura also a leading figure. It affiliated to the International Federation of Christian Trade Unions.

In 1978, the federation merged with the ULC, the Nigeria Trade Union Congress and the smaller Labour Unity Front, to form the Nigeria Labour Congress.
