= Medical and Health Workers' Union of Nigeria =

The Medical and Health Workers' Union of Nigeria (MHWUN) is a trade union representing medical workers in Nigeria.

== History ==
The union was founded in 1978, when the Government of Nigeria merged the following unions:

- Animal Health Workers' Union of Nigeria
- Association of Public Health Inspectors of Nigeria
- Catholic Hospital Workers' Union
- Dispensary Overseers Workers' Union
- Eastern Region Nigeria Union of Rural Health Workers' Union
- Government Health Department D/P Workers' Union of Northern Nigeria
- Medical and Health Department Workers' Union of Nigeria
- Medical Technical Workers' Union
- Nigerian Baptist Mission Medical and General Workers' Union
- Nigerian Medical Records Workers' Union
- Nigerian Union of Dispensing Attendants
- Nursing and Health Auxiliary Staff Association
- Orthopaedic Limb Workers' Union of Western Nigeria
- Sacred Heart Hospital General Workers' Union of Nigeria
- Tuberculosis Preventive Staff Association
- Tse-Tse and Trypanosomiasis Staff Association, Federation of Nigeria
- Uromi Catholic Hospital Workers' Union

In 1978, the union was a founding affiliate of the Nigeria Labour Congress. It had 41,000 members by 1988, growing to 100,000 by 1995, but falling back to 45,000 in 2005.

== Leadership ==
=== Presidents ===
1978: Pa A. A. Akinbola
1980: Y. O. Ozigi
1990: Emeka Okwonkwo
1996: Godwin Wokeh
2000: Mohammed Erena
2004: Ayuba Wabba
2016: Biobelemoye Josiah

=== General Secretaries ===
1978: J. A. Alajo
1984: J. A. Mbah
1998: S. O. Joshua
2000: J. A. Ogunseyin
2003: Marcus Omokhuale
2016: Kabiru Ado Sani
