= National Union of Electricity Employees =

The National Union of Electricity Employees (NUEE) is a trade union representing utilities workers in Nigeria.

The union was founded in 1977 as the National Union of Electricity and Gas Workers, when the Government of Nigeria merged six unions:

- E. S. Company African Workers' Union
- E. C. N. Northern States Electrical Workers' Union
- NEPA and Allied Workers' Union
- Nigerian Electricity Workers' Union
- Nigerian Transmission Company Workers' Union
- Technologists Association of National Electric Power Authority

The union was a founding affiliate of the Nigeria Labour Congress (NLC). By 1988, it had 25,893 members, the total falling slightly to 24,000 in 2005. In 2016, the union left the NLC to become a founding constituent of the United Labour Congress (ULC). However, in 2020, the whole ULC rejoined the NLC.
