= Non-Academic Staff Union of Educational and Associated Institutions =

The Non-Academic Staff Union of Educational and Associated Institutions (NASU) is a trade union representing academic workers, other than teachers and lecturers, in Nigeria.

The union was founded in 1978, when the Government of Nigeria merged the following unions:

- University of Ibadan and Allied Institutions Workers' Union
- University College Hospital Workers' Union
- West African Examinations Council Workers' Union
- Cocoa Research Institute of Nigeria General Workers' Union
- Eastern Nigeria Library Staff Union
- University of Nigeria Workers' Union
- University of Ife Workers' Union
- Agricultural Research Workers' Union of Nigeria
- University of Lagos Workers' Union
- Nigerian Institute for Oil Palm Research Workers' Union
- University Teaching Hospital School of Medicine Workers' Union
- Yaba College of Technblogy Workers' Union of Nigeria
- School of Careers (Nigeria) Workers' Union
- Nigerian Union of Non-Teaching Staff
- Ahmadu Bello University Workers' Union
- Clerks and Bursars Union of Secondary and Training Colleges Western Nigeria
- Nigerian Institute for Rubber Research Workers' Union, Mid-West
- East-Central State Union of Education Non-Tutorial Employees
- Nigerian Institute for Trypasonomiasis Research Workers' Union
- Western State Schools and Colleges General Workers' Union
- Non-Tutorial Staff Association of Educational Institutions of East-Central State
- Kainji Lake Research Project and Allied Workers' Union
- Secondary Schools Non-Teaching Staff Workers' Union
- National Library and Allied Institutions Workers Union of Nigeria
- University of Benin Workers' Union
- Ibadan Polytechnic Workers' Union
- University of Benin Teaching Hospital Workers' Union
- Union of Administrative Staff of Mid-West Colleges
- Institute of Management and Technology Workers Union East-Central State of Nigeria
- British Council Staff Union
- College of Science and Technology Workers' Union
- Auchi Polytechnic Workers' Union
- University of Nigeria Teaching Hospital Workers' Union

The union affiliated to the Nigeria Labour Congress. It had 260,000 members in both 1988 and 1995.
