= Nigeria Union of Petroleum and Natural Gas Workers =

Nigerian trade union

The Nigeria Union of Petroleum and Natural Gas Workers (NUPENG) is a trade union representing workers in the extractive industries in Nigeria.

== History ==
The union was established in November 1977, when the Nigerian government restructured trade unions on an industrial basis. Seven unions merged into NUPENG:

- BP Workers' Union
- Consolidated Petroleum Workers of Nigeria
- Esso Workers' Union
- Petroleum Tanker Drivers' Union
- Shell D'Arcy Workers' Union
- Texaco African Workers' Union
- Union of Shell Operations

The union affiliated to the Nigeria Labour Congress (NLC) on its formation, in 1978. By 1988, it had 13,750 members. In 1994, it and the Petroleum and Natural Gas Senior Staff Association of Nigeria held a joint strike against military rule. This led to the arrest of its president, W. K. Agamene, but the military government fell soon after.

By 2005, the union's membership had fallen to 8,000. In 2016, the union left the NLC to become a founding constituent of the United Labour Congress (ULC), and it was recognised as one of the key unions involved. However, in 2020, the whole ULC rejoined the NLC.

== Leadership ==
=== Presidents ===
1977–1983: John Dubre
1984–1986: S. A. Dada
1989–1991: U. M. Okoro
1992–1998: Wariebe Kojo Agamene
1998–2001: Brisibe B. Awe
2001–2009: Peter Akpatason
2009–2018: Igwe Achese
2018–present: Williams Akporeha

=== General Secretaries ===
1977–1981: S. A. Otu
1982–1999: Ovie Kokori
2000–2004: J. I. Akinlaja
2004–2012: Elijah Okougbo
2012–2015: Isaac Aberare
2015–2018: Joseph Ogbebor
2018–2019: Adamu Song
2019–present: Afolabi Olawale
