= Nigeria Trade Union Congress =

The Nigeria Trade Union Congress (NTUC) was a national trade union federation in Nigeria.

== History ==
The union was founded in 1960, as a split from the Trade Union Congress of Nigeria (TUCN) by members who wished to align with the World Federation of Trade Unions (WFTU). It was led by former TUCN president Michael Imoudu.

In 1962, the federation merged with the TUCN, to form the United Labour Congress (ULC), but after the new organisation voted to affiliate to the International Confederation of Free Trade Unions, the NTUC withdrew. It formed Independent United Labour Congress (IULC), with Imoudu as president and Amaefulo Ikoro as general secretary.

The government chose to only recognise the ULC, and the IULC found itself in disputes over the use of funds. Ibrahim Nock and his supporters split away at the end of 1962 to form the Northern Federation of Labour, while early in 1963, Wahab Goodluck and S. U. Bassey took over the leadership of the IULC, which they renamed as the NTUC. In 1968, a small group led by E. Bussey Etienam broke away to form the Nigerian Federation of Labour.

In 1978, the union merged with the ULC and the smaller Labour Unity Front and Nigeria Workers' Council, to form the Nigeria Labour Congress.

== Leadership ==
=== Presidents ===
1960: Michael Imoudu
1962: Wahab Goodluck

=== General Secretaries ===
1960: Amaefulo Ikoro
1962: S. U. Bassey
