= Trade Union Congress of Nigeria (1942) =

Nigerian trade union federation

The Trade Union Congress of Nigeria (TUCN) was a national trade union federation in Nigeria.

== History ==
The federation was established in 1942, as the Federated Trade Union, becoming the TUCN the following year. It was the first federation to receive government approval or to operate on a national basis. T.A. Bankole and M.A. Tukonboh attended the World Trade Union Conference in London on behalf of Nigeria in 1945.

In 1949, a group led by Michael Imoudu split away to form the Nigerian National Federation of Labour, but the two reunited in 1950 as the Nigeria Labour Congress (NLC).

The NLC soon ceased to operate, but was re-established in 1953 by Imoudu, as the All Nigeria Trade Union Federation. The National Council of Trade Unions split away in 1957, but rejoined in 1959, with the merged union re-adopting the TUCN name.

In 1960, Imoudu travelled to the Soviet Union and to China without the approval of the federation, and was suspended. The federation split over the question of whether to affiliate to the International Confederation of Free Trade Unions (ICFTU) or to the World Federation of Trade Unions (WFTU), with the WFTU-supporting minority forming the Nigeria Trade Union Congress (NTUC).

In 1962, the federation merged with the NTUC to form the United Labour Congress.

== Leadership ==
=== Presidents ===
1943: T. A. Bankole
1950: Michael Imoudu
1960: H. P. Adebola

=== General Secretaries ===
1943: M. A. Tukonboh
1950: Nduka Eze
1953: Gogo Chu Nzeribe
1959: L. L. Borah
