= Michael Imoudu =

Nigerian trade unionist

- Born: 7 September 1902; Owan West, Edo State, Nigeria
- Died: 22 June 2005 (aged 102)
- Citizenship: Nigeria
- Occupation: Labour Leader

Michael Athokhamien Omnibus Imoudu was a Nigerian labour union leader.

== Early life and education ==
Imoudu was born in 1902, in Afemai division of Edo State. His father was a soldier in the West African Frontier Force and had served in East Africa and in The Gambia. After the death of his parents in 1922, Imoudu lived and worked for a relative who was a linesman on the railways. Due to the job of the relative, he traveled to various cities in the Mid-West and in the East, during his sojourn, he learned the Igbo language. He attended several schools and finished his elementary education at Agbor Government School in 1927. He traveled to Lagos in 1928 and secured work a year later as a daily labourer, he also worked as a linesman in the Post and Telegraph Department before joining the railways as an apprentice turner.

== Career as labour leader ==
Imoudu started labour union activities as a member of the Railway Workers Union (RWU), the union was to become one of the most militant unions in the country during the colonial period. The union was formed in 1931 at a time when many trade organizations were a lot similar to social undertakings than an industrial movement. In 1939, Imoudu became the president of the union, during the same year, the union was registered under the Trade Union Ordinance which allowed trade unions legal authority to seek collective bargaining with their employers. RWU was the first union registered under the act. Under Imoudu's leadership, the union renewed their demand for higher wages, de-casuaulisation and improved working conditions. He came into limelight in 1941 when he sought the government's and railway management's consent to improve the conditions of technical employees. Though, the colonial government ratified some of their demands, the railway management was slow to implement the changes. After a while, the management released its concessions to the workers who were displeased and several negotiations further took place between July and September 1941. On 30 September 1941, the mechanical workers found their gates locked on the order of the Works Manager. Imoudu then led a march to the seat of government in Lagos Island shouting for the ouster of the works manager. The protest got the attention of the government which took immediate measures to resolve the workers grievances. Though the demonstration was successful, Imoudu later had constant clashes with European managers, it has been said that a reason of the clashes was his disagreement with the preferential treatment meted out to European officials. Between 1941 and 1943, he was queried many times and was dismissed in January 1943.

In July 1941, a representative meeting of some select trade unions in Nigeria was held in Lagos. The meeting led to the founding of the African Civil Servants Technical Workers Union to protect the interest of the African technical workers. Imoudu, representing the railway union was selected as the Vice President. The new union began to agitate for a grant of cost of living allowance or war bonus. In 1942, Imoudu was a labour negotiator in talks with government to grant a Cost of Living Allowance (COLA) to workers to soften the effects of inflation as a result of World War II. The government made some COLA concession in 1942 under the leadership of Bernard Bourdillon, however, some of those concessions were revoked by Arthur Richards.

In 1943, after his dismissal Imoudu was detained but his detention was later changed to restriction of movement under the Nigerian General Defence Regulations, 1941 which was closely related to the British World War II Defence Regulations acts. He was released on 20 May 1945 after the end of the War. However, on 2 June 1945, a large rally was held to welcome him back to Lagos. In the same year, the organized labour movement was negotiating for improved COLA terms. It is assumed his release was to soften the effect of a labour crisis. However, on 21 and 22 June 1945, Imoudu led a radical wing of the organized union to organize a general strike.

In 1946, Imoudu had identified with NCNC and was nominated to the executive council of the party. Along with Nnamdi Azikiwe and Herbert Macaulay, he was a member of NCNC's delegation to London protesting the 1946, Richards Constitution.

From 1947 to 1958, Imoudu was leader of various trade unions. He was president and gogo Chu Nzeribe, his vice president of the Trade Union Congress of Nigeria; an effort at unification of various labour unions in the country. The federation enjoyed initial success, incorporating 45 out of the 57 registered unions at the time. However, conflict arose between radicals and neutral activists, the latter group preferred keeping labour out of radical and socialist related political activity and joining the International Confederation of Free Trade Unions. Imoudu was suspended as president in 1960 after visiting the Soviet Union and China, and led a split which formed the Nigeria Trade Union Congress, then moved on to the Labour Unity Front.

In 1986, Imoudu was honoured with a labour institute, Michael Imodu National Institute for Labour Studies (MINILS), established after him. The institute, being the one of its kind in the whole West Africa, builds the capacity of workers, employees and government officials.

== Second Republic ==
Imodu joined Aminu Kanos People's Redemption Party as its deputy national president. In 1981, political crisis within the party led to a fracturing of the Party and the formation of an Imodu led PRP with Muhammadu Abubakar Rimi as his secretary and Abdullahi Aliyu Sumaila as the Kano state secretary.
