= PENGASSAN =

Nigerian trade union

Petroleum and Natural Gas Senior Staff Association of Nigeria, popularly known as PENGASSAN is a Nigerian trade union formally established in November 1979. The union's jurisdiction is upper and middle level employees in the petroleum and gas industry as opposed to the Nigeria Union of Petroleum and Natural Gas Workers, whose jurisdiction include junior staff members of the oil and gas industry. The impetus behind its establishment was to safeguard and promote the welfare of workers and national interest in the industry and regulate terms and conditions of employment. The union was affiliated with International Federation of Chemical, Energy, Mine and General Workers' Unions.

When the union was founded, functional operations within oil and gas companies were performed by permanent staff while the senior employees in the industry were automatically union members. Strikes by the organization, such as one organized in the aftermath of the June 12 election, got the attention of the government but led to the imprisonment of its general secretary and the imposition of a sole administrator until the death of General Sani Abacha. Since the 2000s, a gradual system of employing independent contractors and service contract staff within the oil industry has contributed to the reduction of PENGASSAN workers engaged in performing major functions in the industry. In addition, automatic union membership was also discontinued in 2005.

The union is affiliated with the Trade Union Congress of Nigeria.
