= Gogo Chu Nzeribe =

Nigerian trade unionist

- Died: 1967
- Education: Primary - Kings College, Lagos state
- Notable work: The secretary general of the Trade Union Congress of Nigeria; Leader of the nation's communist movement during the drive towards independence in the 1950s.

Gogo Chu Nzeribe was a Nigerian trade unionist and a leader of the nation's communist movement during the drive towards independence in the 1950s. He was the secretary general of the Trade Union Congress of Nigeria, which at the time was led by president Michael Imoudu. Nzeribe was murdered in 1967 by troops loyal to the federal side during the crisis of the 1960s. Prior to his death, he was arrested and detained at Dodan Barracks by the Yakubu Gowon regime.

He had a daughter [Ejine] with Nigerian novelist, Flora Nwapa and a son [Lanre] by Sidi Oladotun, a successful Yoruba businesswoman.

== Early life ==
Nzeribe was born into a well-to-do family and attended King's College, Lagos. He turned to trade unionism as a result his interest in Nigeria's struggle for independence. He started out organizing student and workers rallies against the colonial regime.
