= Trade Union Congress of Nigeria (2005) =

National trade union federation

The Trade Union Congress of Nigeria (TUC) is a national trade union federation in Nigeria, focusing on unions representing senior staff.

== History ==
In 1978, trade unions in Nigeria were restructured into 42 industrial unions, and 19 unions representing senior staff. The Nigeria Labour Congress was established to represent the industrial unions. The senior staff unions attempted to found the Federation of Senior Staff Associations of Nigeria, but the government refused to recognise the body. In 1986, the government permitted the formation of a loose, consultative body, the Senior Staff Consultative Association of Nigeria (SESCAN).

In 2005, the law was changed, permitting the formation of multiple national trade union federations, and for senior staff unions to join any federation of their choosing. SESCAN was dissolved, with most of its affiliates forming a new Trade Union Congress of Nigeria. Soon after, it was a founding affiliate of the International Trade Union Confederation.

Together with the Nigeria Labour Congress, the federation supported Peter Obi and the Labour Party in the 2023 Nigerian general election, the first time both organisations had explicitly supported a political party.

== Affiliates ==
As of 2020, the federation has 29 affiliates:

Union	Abbreviation
Anacowa Motorcycle Owners' and Riders' Association	
Academic Staff Union of Secondary Schools	ASUSS
Association of Freight and Heavy Goods Carriers of Nigeria	AFHGCN
Association of Senior Civil Servants of Nigeria	ASCSN
Association of Senior Staff of Banks, Insurance and Financial Institutions	ASSBIFI
Automobile, Boatyard, Transport, Equipment and Allied Senior Staff Association of Nigeria	AUTOBATE
Bus Conductors' Association of Nigeria	BCAN
Chemical and Non-Metallic Products Senior Staff Association	CANMPSSA
Construction and Civil Engineering Senior Staff Association	CCESSA
Food, Beverage and Tobacco Senior Staff Association	FOBTOB
Footwear, Leather and Rubber Products Senior Staff Association of Nigeria	FWLRPSSA
Hotel and Personal Services Senior Staff Association of Nigeria	HAPSSSA
National Association of Community Health Practitioners	NACHPN
National Association of Nigerian Professional Footballers	NANPF
National Towing Vehicle Owners' Association	NTVOA
Nigeria Merchant Navy Officer and Water Transport Senior Staff Association	NMNOWTSSA
Nigeria Union of Allied Health Professions	NUAHP
Petroleum and Natural Gas Senior Staff Association of Nigeria	PENGASSAN
Precision Electrical and Related Equipment Senior Staff Association	PERESSA
Pulp, Paper and Paper Products, Printing and Publishing Senior Staff Association of Nigeria	PPAPPPPSSA
Shop and Distributive Trade Senior Staff Association	SHOPDIS
Senior Staff Association of Electricity and Allied Companies	SSEA&AC
Senior Staff Association of Statutory Corporations Government Owned Companies	SSASSCGOC
Senior Staff Association of Shipping, Clearing and Forwarding Agencies	SSASCFA
Senior Staff Association of Universities, Teaching Hospitals, Research, and Associated Institutions	SSAUTHRIAI
Textiles, Garments and Tailoring Senior Staff Association of Nigeria	TGTSSAN
Tricycle Owners' Association of Nigeria	TOAN
Union of Tipper and Quarry Employers of Nigeria	UTQEN

== Leadership ==
=== Presidents ===
2005: Peace Obiajulu
2007: Peter Esele
2013: Bobboi Bala Kaigama
2019: Quadri A. Olaleye
2022: Festus Osifo

=== General Secretaries ===
2005: John Kolawole
2012: Musa-Lawal Ozigi
2022: Nuhu Toro
