= Nigeria Labour Congress =

Umbrella organization for trade unions in Nigeria

NLC
- Nigeria Labour Congress
- Founded: 1978
- Headquarters: Abuja, Nigeria
- Location: Nigeria
- Members: 4 million
- Comrade: Joe Ajaero
- Key people: Joe Ajaero, President; Emmanuel Ugboaja, General Secretary
- Affiliations: ITUC
- Website: www.nlcng.org

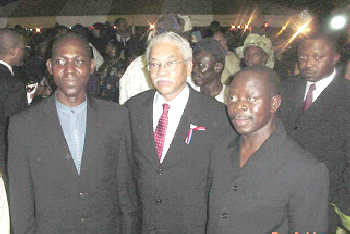
Adams Oshiomhole, former President of the Nigeria Labour Congress (right) with U.S. Ambassador to Nigeria Howard Franklin Jeter (center), July 5, 2002, Lagos.

The Nigeria Labour Congress (NLC) is an umbrella organization for trade unions in Nigeria.

== History ==
The Nigerian Labour Congress was founded in December 1978, as a merger of four different organisations: the Nigeria Trade Union Congress (NTUC), Labour Unity Front (LUF), United Labour Congress (ULC) and Nigeria Workers' Council (NWC). However, the recently established Federal Military Government, led by Murtala Mohammed, refused to recognise the new organisation, and instead set up the Adebiyi Tribunal to investigate the activities of trade unions and their leaders. The Tribunal reported in 1976 and claimed that all the existing trade union centres propagated Cold War ideologies, depended on funding from international union federations, and mismanaged funds. This was used as a justification to ban all four centres, with M. O. Abiodun appointed as the administrator of trade unions. He accepted the establishment of a new Nigeria Labour Congress, on the condition that the approximately 1,500 affiliated unions were restructured into 42 industrial unions, plus 19 unions representing senior staff.

In 1978, the Nigeria Labour Congress was established, with the 42 industrial unions affiliated. It was to be the only legal trade union federation. Its leadership included many of the leading figures from its four predecessors, with Wahab Goodluck becoming its founding president.

During its history, conflicts with the military regime twice led to the dissolution of the NLC's national organs, the first in 1988 under the military regime of General Ibrahim Babangida and the second in 1994, under the regime of General Sani Abacha. In 1996, the 42 affiliates of the NLC were merged into 29, by Act of Parliament. Under Nigeria's military governments, labour leaders were frequently arrested and union meetings disrupted. Following democratic reforms in the country, some of the anti-union regulations were abolished in January 1999. The same month Adams Oshiomhole was elected President of the reformed organisation.

In the early 2000s, conflict between the government and the NLC escalated due to the organisation's opposition to higher fuel prices. The price increases are the result of decisions by the Olusegun Obasanjo government to dramatically reduce subsidies and to deregulate the purchase and sale of fuel. The NLC has led several general strikes protesting the government's fuel price policy.

In September 2004, the NLC gave the federal government an ultimatum to reverse the decision to reintroduce the controversial fuel tax or face a nationwide protest strike. The strike threat was made despite the fact that a Federal High Court judgement in an earlier dispute had declared the organisation lacking legal power to call a general strike over government policies.

Following the announcement of the strike plans, the NLC claimed President Adams Oshiomhole was arrested October 9, 2004 at a protest at Nnamdi Azikiwe Airport. According to the organisation, Oshiomhole was "abducted by a team of operatives of the State Security Services (SSS) numbering over fifteen, who overpowered him, wrestled him to the ground and bundled him into a standby Peugeot 504 station wagon, which bore no licence plates." The State Security Services called the claim "sensational and inaccurate reporting", saying that the NLC president had a "misunderstanding" with field operatives, but that the matter was soon resolved. A presidential spokesperson claimed that Oshiomhole was only invited for a "chat" at the airport, no arrest having taken place.

In 2005, the law was changed to permit other trade union federation to receive government recognition, and also to permit senior staff unions to join the NLC. In 2016, about 25 affiliates left to form the United Labour Congress, but they rejoined the NLC in 2020. By the end of the year, it had 43 affiliates, which as of 2016 represented more than 4,000,000 members.

One of the strongest protest of the NLC can be traced to January 2012 during the President Goodluck Jonathan administration. The president and his economic team had argued that fuel subsidy payments was making the country lose billions of naira and it will save around "£4.2bn annually to invest in underperforming refineries that have forced Nigeria to import its own oil once it has been refined". The president said his government was no more interested in the payment of fuel subsidy to petroleum markerters. This will move fuel prices which was sold for N65 a litre with subsidy inclusive to around N141 which implies more than a hundred per cent increase.

The campaign for fuel subsidy removal was supported by the ministers in his cabinet and mostly chaired by the then finance minister/coordinating minister for economy Dr. Ngozi Okonjo Iweala. The government announced that the fuel subsidy was going to be removed by January 2012 and this announcement was not welcomed by the Nigeria Labour Congress. Abdulwahed Omar, the then NLC president challenged the government that there will be wide spread mass protest in Nigeria if it continued with its plans to remove the fuel subsidy. The NLC was able to rally other trade unions and civic societies to support its planned protest. This challenge was marked by actions when the government moved on with the removal of payments for fuel subsidy. By 9 January 2012, massive protest erupted around Nigeria and in major cities including Lagos, Abuja, Port Harcourt and Kano. These protest crippled the economy as there was a total shutdown of the Nations different workforce and it lasted more than five working days. This led the then president Jonathan to announce on live TV that government will now subsidize fuel prices and reduce it to about $2.75 (£1.80) a gallon. The protest was eventually suspended after this broadcast by the federal government.

Together with the Trade Union Congress of Nigeria, the NLC supported Peter Obi and the Labour Party in the 2023 Nigerian general election, a party the NLC started in 2002. This was the first time the union expressed explicit support for a political party.

== Women's wing ==
The National Women Commission is the national women's wing of NLC. It was created in 2003 to increase the participation of women in the affairs of the union. Beginning in 1983, demand for more recognition of working women led to the establishment of women's wing in state capitals. Currently state branches of NLC have a women's committee and the chairperson of the committee is an automatic member of the administrative council of the state's NLC. On the national level, the head of the National Women Commission is automatically a vice-president of NLC.The president of the National Women Commission is Comrade Rita Goyit. The women's wing also engages in massive rallies and protest in support for women's rights and against gender based violence against women.

== Affiliates ==
=== Current affiliates ===
The following unions are affiliated to the NLC:

Union	Abbreviation	Founded	Membership (1988)	Membership (1995)	Membership (2005)
Academic Staff Union of Polytechnics	ASUP				
Academic Staff Union of Research Institutions	ASURI				
Academic Staff Union of Universities	ASUU	1978			
Agricultural and Allied Employees' Union of Nigeria	AAEUN	2008	N/A	N/A	N/A
Amalgamated Union of Public Corporation, Civil Service Technical and Recreational Services Employees	AUPCTRE	1996	N/A	N/A	85,000
Colleges of Education Academic Staff Union	COEASU				
Iron and Steel Senior Staff Association of Nigeria	ISSSAN	1981			
Judicial Staff Union of Nigeria	JUSUN				
Maritime Workers' Union of Nigeria	MWUN	1996	N/A	N/A	83,479
Medical and Health Workers' Union of Nigeria	MHWUN	1978	41,000	100,000	45,000
Metal Products Senior Staff Association of Nigeria	MEPROSSAN				
National Association of Academic Technologists	NAAT				
National Association of Nigeria Nurses and Midwives	NANNM	1978	50,000	100,000	125,000
National Union of Air Transport Employees	NUATE	1978		16,000	8,820
National Union of Banks, Insurance and Financial Institution Employees	NUBIFIE	1978	69,613	80,000	15,060
National Union of Chemical, Footwear, Rubber, Leather and Non-Metallic Employees	NUCFRLANMPE	1996	N/A	N/A	32,121
National Union of Civil Engineering, Construction, Furniture and Wood Workers	NUCECFWW	1996	N/A	N/A	62,000
National Union of Electricity Employees	NUEE	1978	25,893	25,500	24,000
National Union of Food, Beverage and Tobacco Employees	NUFBTE	1978	44,405	40,000	160,000
National Union of Hotels and Personal Services Workers	NUHPSW	1978	30,000	30,000	3,613
National Union of Lottery Agents and Employees	NULAE				
National Union of Postal and Telecommunication Employees	NUPTE	1978	29,000	30,000	8,000
National Union of Printing, Publishing and Paper Products Workers	NUPPPPROW	1996	N/A	N/A	6,623
National Union of Road Transport Workers	NURTW	1978	30,000	70,000	96,000
National Union of Shop and Distributive Employees	NUSDE	1978		20,000	4,628
National Union of Textile, Garment and Tailoring Workers of Nigeria	NUTGTWN	1978	41,312	47,000	30,000
Nigeria Civil Service Union	NCSU	1978	205,397	205,000	100,000
Nigeria Union of Journalists	NUJ	1978	3,950	5,000	35,000
Nigeria Union of Local Government Employees	NULGE	1978		245,000	24,434
Nigeria Union of Mine Workers	NUMW	1996	N/A	N/A	2,739
Nigeria Union of Pensioners	NUP	1978	286,000	700,000	1,000,000
Nigeria Union of Petroleum and Natural Gas Workers	NUPENG	1978	13,750	35,000	8,000
Nigeria Union of Public Service Reportorial, Secretarial, Data Processors and Allied Workers	NUPSRSDAW	1978			10,949
Nigeria Union of Railwaymen	NUR	1978	20,634	33,000	
Nigeria Union of Teachers	NUT	1978	250,000	250,000	35,000
Nigeria Welders' and Filters' Association	NIWELFU				
Non-Academic Staff Union of Educational and Associated Institutions	NASU	1978	260,000	260,000	67,462
Parliamentary Staff Association of Nigeria	PASAN				
Radio, Television, Theatre and Arts Workers' Union	RATTAWU	1978	80,000	5,000	7,000
Senior Staff Association of Nigerian Polytechnics	SSANIP				
Senior Staff Association of Nigerian Universities	SSANU	1993	N/A		
Senior Staff Union of Colleges of Education in Nigeria	SSUCOEN				
Steel and Engineering Workers' Union of Nigeria	SEWUN	1996	N/A	N/A	28,000

=== Former affiliates ===
Union	Abbreviation	Founded	Left	Reason not affiliated	Membership (1995)
Agricultural and Allied Workers' Union of Nigeria	AAWUN	1978	2008	Merged into AAEUN	6,000
Automobile, Boatyard, Transport Equipment and Allied Workers' Union of Nigeria	ABTEAWUON	1978	1996	Merged into SEWUN	17,000
Civil Service Technical Workers' Union of Nigeria	CSTWU	1978	1996	Merged into AUPCTRE	100,000
Dockworkers' Union of Nigeria	DUN	1978	1996	Merged into MWUN	20,000
Footwear, Leather and Rubber Products Workers' Union of Nigeria	FLRPWUN	1978	1996	Merged into NUCFRLANMPE	11,500
Iron and Steel Workers' Union of Nigeria	ISWUN	1978	1996	Merged into SEWUN	
Metal Products Workers' Union of Nigeria	MPWUN	1978	1996	Merged into SEWUN	7,000
Metallic and Non-Metallic Mine Workers' Union	MNMWU	1978	1996	Merged into NUMW	20,000
National Union of Chemical and Non-Metallic Products Workers	NUCANMP	1978	1996	Merged into NUCFRLANMPE	40,000
National Union of Furniture, Fixtures and Wood Workers	NUFFWW	1978	1996	Merged into NUCECFWW	13,000
National Union of Paper and Paper Products Workers	NUPPPW	1978	1996	Merged into NUPPPROW	
National Union of Public Corporations Employees	NUPCE	1978	1996	Merged into AUPCTRE	
Nigeria Coal Miners' Union	NCMU	1978	1996	Merged into NUMW	1,500
Nigeria Ports Authority Workers' Union	NPAWU	1978	1996	Merged into MWUN	22,500
Nigeria Union of Construction and Civil Engineering Workers	NUCCEW	1978	1996	Merged into NUCECFWW	73,000
Nigeria Union of Seamen and Water Transport Workers	NUSWTW	1978	1996	Merged into MWUN	
Precision, Electrical and Related Equipments Workers' Union	PEREWU	1978	1996	Merged into SEWUN	10,000
Printing and Publishing Workers' Union	PAPWU	1978	1996	Merged into NUPPPROW	
Recreational Services Employees' Union	RSEU	1978	1996	Merged into AUPCTRE	17,000
Union of Shipping, Clearing and Forwarding Agencies Workers' of Nigeria	USCFAWN	1978	1996	Merged into MWUN	4,000

== Leadership ==
=== Presidents ===
1978: Wahab Goodluck
1979: Hassan Sunmonu
1984: Ali Chiroma
1988: Pascal Bafyau
1994: Post vacant
1999: Adams Oshiomhole
2007: Abdulwaheed Omar
2015: Ayuba Wabba
2023: Joe Ajaero

=== General Secretaries ===
1978: Aliyu Dangiwa
1986: Lasisi Osunde
1992: Post vacant
2001: John Odah
2014: Peter Ozo-Eson
2019: Emmanuel Ugboaja

== See also ==
- History of Nigeria
- Economy of Nigeria
