= 2023 Taraba State gubernatorial election =

2023 gubernatorial election in Taraba State, Nigeria

- 18 March 2023
- Registered: 2,022,374
Nominee	Kefas Agbu	Muhammad Sani Yahaya	Emmanuel Bwacha
Party	PDP	NNPP	APC
Running mate	Aminu Abdullahi Alkali	Danladi Yakubu Balutu	Iliyasu Kirim
Popular vote	302,614	202,277	142,502
Governor before election
Darius Ishaku
PDP
Elected Governor
Kefas Agbu
PDP

The 2023 Taraba State gubernatorial election was held on 18 March 2023, to elect the governor of Taraba State, concurrent with elections to the Taraba State House of Assembly as well as twenty-seven other gubernatorial elections and elections to all other state houses of assembly. The election, which was postponed from its original 11 March date, was held three weeks after the presidential election and National Assembly elections. Incumbent PDP Governor Darius Ishaku was term-limited and could not seek re-election to a third term. Kefas Agbu held the office for the PDP by defeating NNPP nominee Muhammad Sani Yahaya.

Party primaries were scheduled for between 4 April and 9 June 2022 with the Peoples Democratic Party nominating Agbu on 25 May while the All Progressives Congress nominated Senator for Taraba South Emmanuel Bwacha on 26 May. Two prolonged court battles challenged the APC primary with one case successfully nullifying the primary through a High Court ruling on 14 November 2022; however, the other case reached higher courts faster and culminated in the Supreme Court also nullifying the primary on 1 February 2023 before ordering a rerun to be conducted. The APC conducted a new primary on 10 February that resulted in Bwacha winning again.

On 21 March, INEC declared Agbu as the victor with official totals showing him winning about 276,000 votes to defeat Yahaya with about 202,000 votes and Bwacha with roughly 143,000 votes. While Bwacha conceded the election, Yahaya rejected the results due to alleged irregularities and filed a challenge at the electoral tribunal. The legal case eventually reached the Supreme Court, which upheld the election of Agbu in a January 2024 judgment.

== Electoral system ==
The governor of Taraba State is elected using a modified two-round system. To be elected in the first round, a candidate must receive the plurality of the vote and over 25% of the vote in at least two-thirds of state local government areas. If no candidate passes this threshold, a second round will be held between the top candidate and the next candidate to have received a plurality of votes in the highest number of local government areas.

== Background ==
Taraba State is a diverse, agriculture-based state in the Middle Belt that has faced challenges in security as inter-ethnic violence and conflict between herders and farmers heavily affect the state. The overproliferation of weaponry and increased pressure for land along with failures in governance led to the worsening of these clashes in the years ahead of the election.

Politically, the 2019 elections were a mixed bag for both major parties. On the federal level, PDP nominee Atiku Abubakar narrowly won the state but it swung slightly towards Buhari; legislatively, the parties fairly evenly split the Senate seats and won House of Representatives seats. Statewise, Ishaku won re-election by a wide margin and the PDP won a majority in the House of Assembly. At the beginning of Ishaku's second term, he vowed to improve state revenue, revitalise agriculture, and develop security. In terms of his performance, Ishaku was criticized for the initial failure of a 2019 peace meeting between Tiv and Jukun groups and his prolonged absence from the state in 2020.

== Primary elections ==
The primaries, along with any potential challenges to primary results, were to take place between 4 April and 3 June 2022 but the deadline was extended to 9 June. According to some candidates and community groups, an informal zoning gentlemen's agreement sets the Taraba North Senatorial District to have the next governor as no governor has come from the North since 2007. However, no major party officially closed zoned their nominations to non-northerners and both ended up nominating southerners.

=== All Progressives Congress ===
On 20 April 2022, the APC National Executive Committee announced the party's schedule for gubernatorial primaries, setting its expression of interest form price at ₦10 million and nomination form price at ₦40 million with a 50% nomination form discount for candidates younger than 40 while women and candidates with disabilities get free nomination forms. Forms were to be sold from 26 April to 6 May until the deadline was later extended to 10 May then 12 May. After the submission of nomination forms by 13 May, candidates were screened by a party committee on 14 and 15 May while 16 May was the date for the screening appeal process. Ward congresses and LGA congresses were set for between 7 and 9 May to elect delegates for the primary. Candidates approved by the screening process advanced to a primary set for 26 May, in concurrence with other APC gubernatorial primaries; challenges to the result could be made the next day.

On the primary date, disputes over the direct primary method and the shooting of a primary committee member forced the committee to suspend the primary. After the primary continued and completed on 27 May, Senator Emmanuel Bwacha was declared victor with over 97,000 votes, about 61%; Bwacha called for party unity in his acceptance speech. In July, Bwacha selected Iliyasu Kirim—from Karim Lamido in the northern district—as his running mate. Kirim also called for party unity after the nomination. However, David Sabo Kente—a losing aspirant—rejected the results and approached the judiciary for an annulment; on 20 September, a Federal High Court sitting in Jalingo sided with Kente and ordered a new primary to be conducted based on electoral irregularities. The lawsuit of another aspirant—Senator Yusuf Abubakar Yusuf—ended with a High Court sitting in Abuja also voiding the primary on 14 November. Bwacha initiated an appeal against the Jalingo High Court ruling and vowed to also appeal the Abuja High Court ruling. Although the Abuja High Court case remained in litigation, Jalingo High Court case also continued with a Court of Appeal judgment on 24 November relegitimizing the primary. However, Kente appealed that ruling to the Supreme Court which sided with him in a 1 February judgment that definitively ordered a new primary to be held within fourteen days. Kante lauded the court ruling and asked his supporters to await the response of the national party while Bwacha's camp expressed confidence that he would win the rerun. However, the national party did not publicly order a new primary until 9 February, when it communicated to the aspirants that the primary would be held on the next day in Jalingo. The process was disputed by candidates other than Bwacha, who boycotted the exercise and vowed to return to court. In the rerun direct primary, Bwacha won again by a similarly wide margin.

==== Nominated ====
- Emmanuel Bwacha: Senator for Taraba South (2011–present) and former Commissioner for Agriculture
  - Running mate—Iliyasu Kirim

==== Eliminated in primary ====
- David Sabo Kente: member of the Northeast Development Commission (2019–present), 2019 APC gubernatorial aspirant, and 2015 SDP gubernatorial nominee
- Danladi Kifasi: former civil servant
- Saleh Mamman: former Minister of Power (2019–2021)
- Anthony George Manzo: former Senator for Taraba North (2007–2011)
- Muhammad Sani Yahaya: 2019 APC gubernatorial aspirant and professor (defected after the primary to successfully run in the NNPP gubernatorial primary)
- Yusuf Abubakar Yusuf: Senator for Taraba Central (2015–present)

==== Withdrew ====
- Ezekiel Afukonyo: Chairman of the Board of Nnamdi Azikiwe University Teaching Hospital and 2019 APC gubernatorial aspirant

==== Declined ====
- Abubakar Sani Danladi: 2019 APC gubernatorial nominee and former Senator for Taraba North
- Garba Umar: 2019 APC gubernatorial aspirant and former acting governor (2012–2013)

==== Results ====
Annulled primary results
Aspirant' vote share
1. Emmanuel Bwacha 62.57 (61.8%)
2. Anthony George Manzo 10.65 (10.5%)
3. Danladi Kifasi 7.82 (7.73%)
4. Yusuf Abubakar Yusuf 6.94 (6.86%)
5. Muhammad Sani Yahaya 6.36 (6.28%)
6. Other aspirants 6.86 (6.78%)

APC primary results
Party	Candidate	Votes	%
APC	Emmanuel Bwacha	97,655	62.57%
APC	Anthony George Manzo	16,625	10.65%
APC	Danladi Kifasi	12,202	7.82%
APC	Yusuf Abubakar Yusuf	10,828	6.94%
APC	Muhammad Sani Yahaya	9,929	6.36%
APC	David Sabo Kente	5,836	3.74%
APC	Saleh Mamman	4,875	3.12%
Total votes		156,082	100.00%
Turnout		156,082	57.93%

Aspirants' vote share
1. Emmanuel Bwacha (99.0%)
2. Yusuf Abubakar Yusuf (1.02%)

APC rerun primary results
Party	Candidate	Votes	%
APC	Emmanuel Bwacha	778	98.98%
APC	Yusuf Abubakar Yusuf	8	1.02%
APC	Other aspirants	0	0.00%
Total votes		786	100.00%

=== People's Democratic Party ===
In early 2022, state PDP Chairman Kefas Agbu said that the party would adhere to zoning to the North with later reports stating that both Agbu and Ishaku were against a nominee coming from the South as Ishaku himself is Southern. However, Agbu later said that while the party's position was that the ticket should go to a northerner, the zoning would only be unofficial and aspirants from other regions would not be prevented from contesting. Also, Agbu was criticized for accompanying candidate Victor Bala Kona to purchase his nomination forms along with Ishaku's senatorial forms; the appearance created an assumption that both Agbu and Ishaku were supporting Bala Kona.

On 16 March 2022, the national PDP announced its gubernatorial primaries' schedule, setting its expression of interest form price at ₦1 million and the nomination form price at ₦20 million with a 50% discount for candidates between 25 and 30. Forms were to be sold until 1 April but the party later extended the deadline four times before reaching a final deadline of 22 April. After the submission of nomination forms by 25 April, candidates were screened by a party committee on 28 April while 2 May was the rescheduled date for the screening appeal process. Ward congresses were set for 29 April and LGA congresses were rescheduled for 10 May to elect delegates for the primary. Candidates approved by the screening process advanced to a primary set for 25 May, in concurrence with all other PDP gubernatorial primaries; challenges to the result could be made in the following days.

Ahead of the primary, there were rumors that Agbu had secretly purchased nomination forms himself; Agbu, from Taraba South, denied the rumors and claimed that his candidacy would go against zoning. However, in the days before the primary, reports emerged that former minister and de facto Taraba PDP leader Theophilus Danjuma planned on imposing Agbu as the nominee. On primary day, the plan was enacted as Agbu suddenly emerged as a candidate and easily won the primary by an 80% margin of victory amid protests from other candidates. In the weeks following the primary, two defeated candidates—Jerome Nyame and Hilkiah BubaJoda Mafindi—separately asked courts to disqualify Agbu because Agbu had not purchased forms. This legal situation changed in August when the defeated aspirants coalesced around Nyame's suit as Mafindi and Joseph Albasu Kunini joined as interested parties. However, the cases were dismissed on 20 September by a High Court then on 25 November by a Court of Appeal. By February 2023, the case reached the Supreme Court which also dismissed the case based on technicalities.

==== Nominated ====
- Kefas Agbu: former state PDP Chairman and former chairman of the Nigerian Maritime Administration and Safety Agency
  - Running mate—Aminu Abdullahi Alkali

==== Eliminated in primary ====
- Aminu Ayuba Kotolo: former state Accountant-General
- Victor Bala Kona: former Taraba State PDP Chairman (2012–2020)
- Joel Danlami Ikenya: 2019 APGA Taraba South senatorial nominee, former Minister of Labour and Productivity (2014–2015), and former Senator for Taraba South (2007–2011)
- Joseph Albasu Kunini: House of Assembly member for Lau (2011–present) and Speaker of the House of Assembly (2019–present)
- Hilkiah BubaJoda Mafindi: former chairman of the State Planning Commission
- Jerome Nyame: entrepreneur and brother of former governor Jolly Nyame

==== Withdrew ====
- Damian Dodo: lawyer

==== Results ====
Aspirant' vote share
1. Kefas Agbu (86.0%)
2. Joseph Albasu Kunini (6.02%)
3. Other aspirants (7.96%)

PDP primary results
Party	Candidate	Votes	%
PDP	Kefas Agbu	443	86.02%
PDP	Joseph Albasu Kunini	31	6.02%
PDP	Jerome Nyame	24	4.66%
PDP	Joel Danlami Ikenya	11	2.14%
PDP	Hilkiah BubaJoda Mafindi	6	1.17%
PDP	Aminu Ayuba Kotolo	0	0.00%
PDP	Victor Bala Kona	0	0.00%
Total votes		515	100.00%
Invalid or blank votes		2	N/A
Turnout		517	92.82

=== Minor parties ===
- Hamman Muhammed Mbali (Accord)
  - Running mate: Mohammed Isa
- Abubakar Sadiq Gambo (Action Alliance)
  - Running mate: Oliver Ndi Mayuka
- Hamman Abubakar Mustapha (Action Democratic Party)
  - Running mate: Bako Mairiga Mamman
- Danjuma Umaru (Action Peoples Party)
  - Running mate: Matakitswen Shekarau Masaibi
- David Charima (African Action Congress)
  - Running mate: Shuaibu Abbo Usman
- Muhammad A. Ibrahim (African Democratic Congress)
  - Running mate: Emmanuel K. Isuwa
- Gideon Wunuji Adda (Allied Peoples Movement)
  - Running mate: Anas Dodo Adamu
- Sunday Fudemure Manu (All Progressives Grand Alliance)
  - Running mate: Musa Samaila
- Kabiru Bala (Boot Party)
  - Running mate: Adamu Nawukari Sonweh
- Joel Danlami Ikenya (Labour Party)
  - Running mate: Mohammed Ibrahim Lau
- Muhammad Sani Yahaya (New Nigeria Peoples Party)
  - Running mate: Danladi Yakubu Balutu
- Ibrahim Sani (National Rescue Movement)
  - Running mate: Elijah Amamji
- Josiah Wukari Wasa (People's Redemption Party)
  - Running mate: Suleiman Ahmed Nyakos
- Danladi Baido (Social Democratic Party)
  - Running mate: Ahmadu Dattijo
- Sa'adu Abubakar Hassan (Young Progressives Party)
  - Running mate: Tsokojo Daniel Tsokojo
- Bello Adamu (Zenith Labour Party)
  - Running mate: Samaila Andeze

== Campaign ==
As the general election campaign began in June 2022, pundits focused on the major candidates' attempts to reconcile aggrieved members of their own parties in the wake of contentious party primaries. While the APC primary was also disputed, the sudden emergence of Agbu as a PDP candidate was seen as a betrayal as some party members especially due to the previous assurances from Agbu that the plot was not true. It was also noted that both parties disregarded the zoning principle by picking nominees from the southern district instead of the northern district. Again, this controversy was less impactful in the APC as the party had fully opened its primary to all contenders but in the PDP, both Ishaku and then-state party chairman Agbu had promised to nominate a northerner. In the APC, the controversy centered around the primary conduct itself as analysts expect runners-up to leave the party or refuse to support Bwacha.

As campaigning continued into August 2022, the PDP was still beset by primary disputes as the aggrieved aspirants coalesced behind a single lawsuit challenging Agbu's nomination. Another factor was the presidential pardon of corrupt former governor Jolly Nyame; his release in August swiftly led to speculation on which gubernatorial candidate he would support with a focus on Agbu, Bwacha, and SDP nominee Danladi Baido. However, the next month brought a new surprise to the race as Bwacha was removed as APC nominee by a court ruling that annulled its primary. Although the party immediately appealed the ruling, the judgment renewed the APC internal crisis with former aspirants calling for a new primary to be conducted. Although the initial annulment was overturned in late November, the APC crisis had only intensified after another court ruled the primary invalid earlier that month. By February, the initial case reached the Supreme Court which ordered the APC to hold a new primary within fourteen days. On 10 February, the party again nominated Bwacha by a wide margin but similarly to the original primary, other aspirants rejected the process.

On 25 February, the presidential election in the state was won by Atiku Abubakar of the PDP. Not long afterwards, the state Christian Association of Nigeria chapter endorsed Agbu in a move that analysts labeled as potentially impactful. Pundits also noted the impacts of NNPP nominee Muhammad Sani Yahaya and LP nominee Joel Danlami Ikenya in the final stretch of campaigning in addition to ethnic and religious identity politics.

== Projections ==
Source	Projection	As of
Africa Elects (Note: AfricaElects projections predict the likelihood of a candidate winning a state by categorizing a state as "Safe" for exceedingly likely, "Likely" for somewhat likely, and "Lean" for least likely. If no clear determination could be made, states are categorized as "tossups".)	Lean Agbu	17 March 2023
Enough is Enough- SBM Intelligence (Note: EiE-SBM projections predict which candidates will win states.)	Agbu	2 March 2023

== Conduct ==
=== Electoral timetable ===
On 26 February 2022, the Independent National Electoral Commission released the timetable, setting out key dates and deadlines for the election. Months later on 27 May 2022, INEC made a slight revision to the timetable, allowing parties extra time to conduct primaries.

- 28 February 2022 – Publication of Notice of Election
- 4 April 2022 – First day for the conduct of party primaries
- 9 June 2022 (Note: The original deadline was 3 June; however, INEC pushed it back to 9 June at the behest of parties.) – Final day for the conduct of party primaries, including the resolution of disputes arising from them
- 1 July 2022 – First day for submission of nomination forms to INEC via the online portal
- 15 July 2022 – Final day for submission of nomination forms to INEC via the online portal
- 12 October 2022 – Commencement of the official campaign period
- 16 March 2023 (Note: The original deadline was 9 March; however, INEC pushed it back to 16 March.) – Final day of the official campaign period

== General election ==
=== Results ===
2023 Taraba State gubernatorial election
Party	Candidate	Votes	%
A	Hamman Muhammed Mbali		
AA	Abubakar Sadiq Gambo		
ADP	Hamman Abubakar Mustapha		
APP	Danjuma Umaru		
AAC	David Charima		
ADC	Ibrahim Aminu		
APM	Gideon Wunuji Adda		
APC	Emmanuel Bwacha		
APGA	Sunday Fudemure Manu		
BP	Kabiru Bala		
LP	Joel Danlami Ikenya		
New Nigeria Peoples Party	Muhammad Sani Yahaya		
NRM	Ibrahim Sani		
PDP	Kefas Agbu		
PRP	Josiah Wukari Wasa		
SDP	Danladi Baido		
YPP	Sa'adu Abubakar Hassan		
ZLP	Bello Adamu		
Total votes			100.00%
Invalid or blank votes			N/A
Turnout			

==== By senatorial district ====
The results of the election by senatorial district.

Senatorial District	Emmanuel Bwacha APC		Kefas Agbu PDP		Others		Total Valid Votes
Senatorial District	Votes	Percentage	Votes	Percentage	Votes	Percentage	Total Valid Votes
Taraba Central Senatorial District (Note: Comprising the local government areas of Bali, Gashaka, Gassol, Kurmi, and Sardauna.)	TBD	%	TBD	%	TBD	%	TBD
Taraba North Senatorial District (Note: Comprising the local government areas of Ardo Kola, Jalingo, Karim Lamido, Lau, Yorro, and Zing.)	TBD	%	TBD	%	TBD	%	TBD
Taraba South Senatorial District (Note: Comprising the local government areas of Donga, Ibi, Takum, Ussa, and Wukari.)	TBD	%	TBD	%	TBD	%	TBD
Totals	TBD	%	TBD	%	TBD	%	TBD

==== By federal constituency ====
The results of the election by federal constituency.

Federal Constituency	Emmanuel Bwacha APC		Kefas Agbu PDP		Others		Total Valid Votes
Federal Constituency	Votes	Percentage	Votes	Percentage	Votes	Percentage	Total Valid Votes
Bali/Gassol Federal Constituency (Note: Comprising the local government areas of Bali and Gassol Gassol.)	TBD	%	TBD	%	TBD	%	TBD
Jalingo/Yorro/Zing Federal Constituency (Note: Comprising the local government areas of Jalingo, Yorro, and Zing.)	TBD	%	TBD	%	TBD	%	TBD
Karim Lamido/Lau/Ardo-Kola Federal Constituency (Note: Comprising the local government areas of Ardo Kola, Karim Lamido, and Lau.)	TBD	%	TBD	%	TBD	%	TBD
Sardauna/Gashaka/Kurmi Federal Constituency (Note: Comprising the local government areas of Gashaka, Kurmi, and Sardauna.)	TBD	%	TBD	%	TBD	%	TBD
Takum/Donga/Ussa Federal Constituency (Note: Comprising the local government areas of Donga, Takum, and Ussa.)	TBD	%	TBD	%	TBD	%	TBD
Wukari/Ibi Federal Constituency (Note: Comprising the local government areas of Ibi and Wukari.)	TBD	%	TBD	%	TBD	%	TBD
Totals	TBD	%	TBD	%	TBD	%	TBD

==== By local government area ====
The results of the election by local government area.

LGA	Emmanuel Bwacha APC		Kefas Agbu PDP		Others		Total Valid Votes	Turnout Percentage
LGA	Votes	Percentage	Votes	Percentage	Votes	Percentage	Total Valid Votes	Turnout Percentage
Ardo Kola	TBD	%	TBD	%	TBD	%	TBD	%
Bali	TBD	%	TBD	%	TBD	%	TBD	%
Donga	TBD	%	TBD	%	TBD	%	TBD	%
Gashaka	TBD	%	TBD	%	TBD	%	TBD	%
Gassol	TBD	%	TBD	%	TBD	%	TBD	%
Ibi	TBD	%	TBD	%	TBD	%	TBD	%
Jalingo	TBD	%	TBD	%	TBD	%	TBD	%
Karim Lamido	TBD	%	TBD	%	TBD	%	TBD	%
Kurmi	TBD	%	TBD	%	TBD	%	TBD	%
Lau	TBD	%	TBD	%	TBD	%	TBD	%
Sardauna	TBD	%	TBD	%	TBD	%	TBD	%
Takum	TBD	%	TBD	%	TBD	%	TBD	%
Ussa	TBD	%	TBD	%	TBD	%	TBD	%
Wukari	TBD	%	TBD	%	TBD	%	TBD	%
Yorro	TBD	%	TBD	%	TBD	%	TBD	%
Zing	TBD	%	TBD	%	TBD	%	TBD	%
Totals	TBD	%	TBD	%	TBD	%	TBD	%

== See also ==
- 2023 Nigerian elections
- 2023 Nigerian gubernatorial elections
