= 2023 Nigerian presidential election in Taraba State =

- 25 February 2023
- Registered: 2,022,374
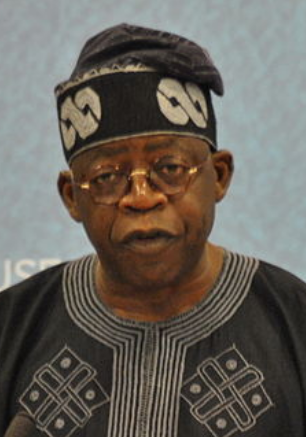

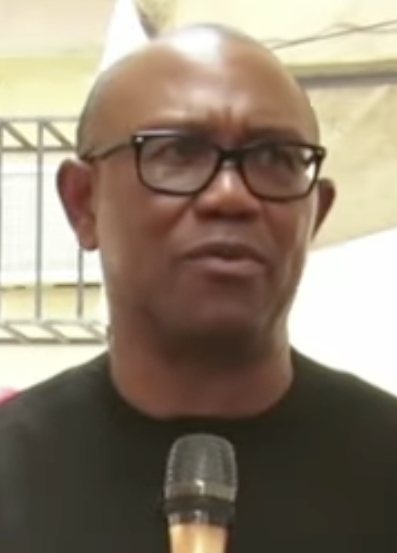

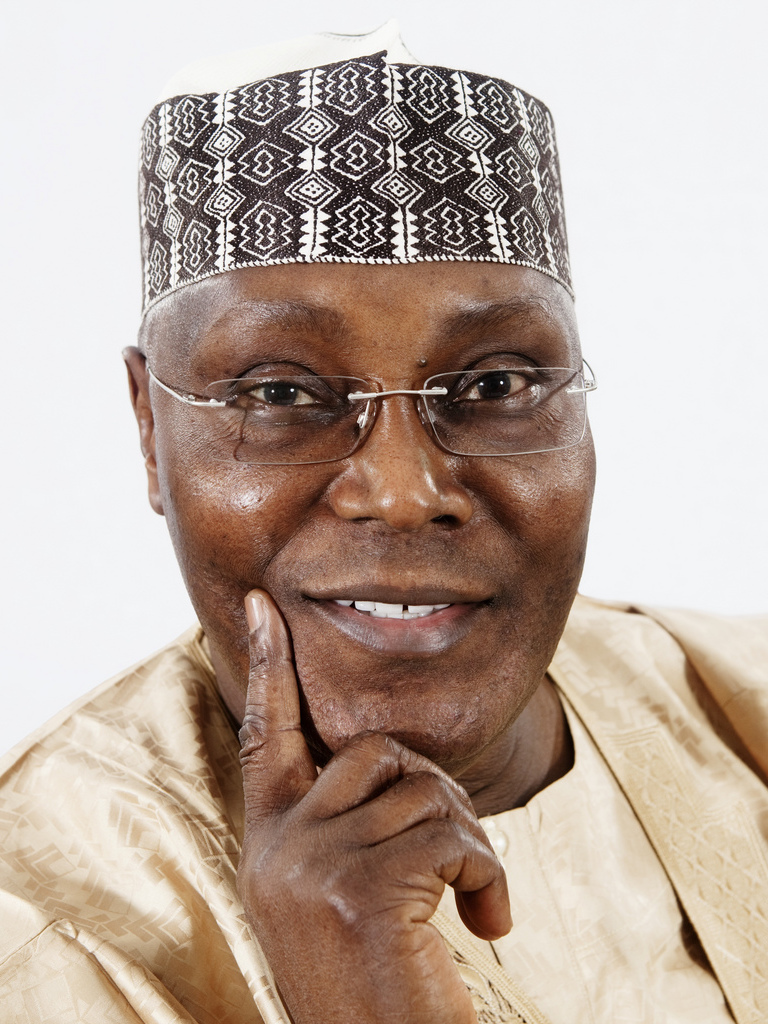
Nominee	Bola Tinubu	Peter Obi
Party	APC	LP
Home state	Lagos	Anambra
Running mate	Kashim Shettima	Yusuf Datti Baba-Ahmed
Nominee	Rabiu Kwankwaso	Atiku Abubakar
Party	New Nigeria Peoples Party	PDP
Home state	Kano	Adamawa
Running mate	Isaac Idahosa	Ifeanyi Okowa
President before election
Muhammadu Buhari
APC
Elected President
TBD

The 2023 Nigerian presidential election in Taraba State will be held on 25 February 2023 as part of the nationwide 2023 Nigerian presidential election to elect the president and vice president of Nigeria. Other federal elections, including elections to the House of Representatives and the Senate, will also be held on the same date while state elections will be held two weeks afterward on 11 March.

== Background ==
Taraba State is a diverse, agriculture-based state in the Middle Belt that has faced challenges in security as inter-ethnic violence and conflict between herders and farmers heavily affect the region. The overproliferation of weaponry and increased pressure for land along with failures in governance led to the worsening of these clashes in the years ahead of the election.

Politically, the 2019 elections were a mixed bag for both major parties. On the federal level, PDP presidential nominee Atiku Abubakar narrowly won the state by 7% but it swung slightly towards Buhari; legislatively, the parties fairly evenly split the Senate seats and House of Representatives seats. Statewise, Ishaku won re-election by a wide margin and the PDP won a majority in the House of Assembly.

== Polling ==
Polling organisation/client	Fieldwork date	Sample size					Others	Undecided	Undisclosed	Not voting
Polling organisation/client	Fieldwork date	Sample size	Tinubu APC	Obi LP	Kwankwaso NNPP	Abubakar PDP	Others	Undecided	Undisclosed	Not voting
BantuPage	December 2022	N/A	9%	22%	1%	30%	–	28%	7%	1%
Nextier (Taraba crosstabs of national poll)	27 January 2023	N/A	25.5%	21.6%	–	51.0%	–	2.0%	–	–
SBM Intelligence for EiE (Taraba crosstabs of national poll)	22 January-6 February 2023	N/A	13%	54%	4%	28%	–	1%	–	–

== Projections ==
Source	Projection		As of
Africa Elects (Note: Africa Elects projections predict the likelihood of a candidate winning a state by categorizing a state as "Safe" for exceedingly likely, "Likely" for somewhat likely, and "Lean" for least likely. If no clear determination could be made, states are categorized as "tossups".)	Lean Abubakar		24 February 2023
Dataphyte (Note: Dataphyte projections predict candidates' projected votal shares in each state.)
Dataphyte	Tinubu:	27.52%	11 February 2023
Dataphyte	Obi:	27.37%	11 February 2023
Dataphyte	Abubakar:	33.77%	11 February 2023
Dataphyte	Others:	16.35%	11 February 2023
Enough is Enough- SBM Intelligence (Note: EiE-SBM projections predict which candidates will win states.)	Obi		17 February 2023
SBM Intelligence (Note: SBM projections predict which candidates will win states or, if no determination could be made, categorizes states as "Too close to call" (TCC).)	Abubakar		15 December 2022
ThisDay (Note: ThisDay projections predict candidates' projected votal shares in each state.)
ThisDay	Tinubu:	10%	27 December 2022
ThisDay	Obi:	20%	27 December 2022
ThisDay	Kwankwaso:	20%	27 December 2022
ThisDay	Abubakar:	40%	27 December 2022
ThisDay	Others/Undecided:	10%	27 December 2022
The Nation (Note: SBM projections predict which candidates will win states or, if no determination could be made, categorizes states as "Battlegrounds.")	Abubakar		12-19 February 2023

== General election ==
=== Results ===
2023 Nigerian presidential election in Taraba State
Party	Candidate	Votes	%
A	Christopher Imumolen		
AA	Hamza al-Mustapha		
ADP	Yabagi Sani		
APP	Osita Nnadi		
AAC	Omoyele Sowore		
ADC	Dumebi Kachikwu		
APC	Bola Tinubu		
APGA	Peter Umeadi		
APM	Princess Chichi Ojei		
BP	Sunday Adenuga		
LP	Peter Obi		
NRM	Felix Johnson Osakwe		
New Nigeria Peoples Party	Rabiu Kwankwaso		
PRP	Kola Abiola		
PDP	Atiku Abubakar		
SDP	Adewole Adebayo		
YPP	Malik Ado-Ibrahim		
ZLP	Dan Nwanyanwu		
Total votes			100.00%
Invalid or blank votes			N/A
Turnout			

==== By senatorial district ====
The results of the election by senatorial district.

Senatorial District	Bola Tinubu APC		Atiku Abubakar PDP		Peter Obi LP		Rabiu Kwankwaso NNPP		Others		Total valid votes
Senatorial District	Votes	%	Votes	%	Votes	%	Votes	%	Votes	%	Total valid votes
Taraba Central Senatorial District (Note: Comprising the local government areas of Bali, Gashaka, Gassol, Kurmi, and Sardauna.)	TBD	%	TBD	%	TBD	%	TBD	%	TBD	%	TBD
Taraba North Senatorial District (Note: Comprising the local government areas of Ardo Kola, Jalingo, Karim Lamido, Lau, Yorro, and Zing.)	TBD	%	TBD	%	TBD	%	TBD	%	TBD	%	TBD
Taraba South Senatorial District (Note: Comprising the local government areas of Donga, Ibi, Takum, Ussa, and Wukari.)	TBD	%	TBD	%	TBD	%	TBD	%	TBD	%	TBD
Totals	TBD	%	TBD	%	TBD	%	TBD	%	TBD	%	TBD

==== By federal constituency ====
The results of the election by federal constituency.

Federal Constituency	Bola Tinubu APC		Atiku Abubakar PDP		Peter Obi LP		Rabiu Kwankwaso NNPP		Others		Total valid votes
Federal Constituency	Votes	%	Votes	%	Votes	%	Votes	%	Votes	%	Total valid votes
Bali/Gassol Federal Constituency (Note: Comprising the local government areas of Bali and Gassol Gassol.)	TBD	%	TBD	%	TBD	%	TBD	%	TBD	%	TBD
Jalingo/Yorro/Zing Federal Constituency (Note: Comprising the local government areas of Jalingo, Yorro, and Zing.)	TBD	%	TBD	%	TBD	%	TBD	%	TBD	%	TBD
Karim Lamido/Lau/Ardo-Kola Federal Constituency (Note: Comprising the local government areas of Ardo Kola, Karim Lamido, and Lau.)	TBD	%	TBD	%	TBD	%	TBD	%	TBD	%	TBD
Sardauna/Gashaka/Kurmi Federal Constituency (Note: Comprising the local government areas of Gashaka, Kurmi, and Sardauna.)	TBD	%	TBD	%	TBD	%	TBD	%	TBD	%	TBD
Takum/Donga/Ussa Federal Constituency (Note: Comprising the local government areas of Donga, Takum, and Ussa.)	TBD	%	TBD	%	TBD	%	TBD	%	TBD	%	TBD
Wukari/Ibi Federal Constituency (Note: Comprising the local government areas of Ibi and Wukari.)	TBD	%	TBD	%	TBD	%	TBD	%	TBD	%	TBD
Totals	TBD	%	TBD	%	TBD	%	TBD	%	TBD	%	TBD

==== By local government area ====
The results of the election by local government area.

Local government area	Bola Tinubu APC		Atiku Abubakar PDP		Peter Obi LP		Rabiu Kwankwaso NNPP		Others		Total valid votes	Turnout (%)
Local government area	Votes	%	Votes	%	Votes	%	Votes	%	Votes	%	Total valid votes	Turnout (%)
Ardo Kola	TBD	%	TBD	%	TBD	%	TBD	%	TBD	%	TBD	%
Bali	TBD	%	TBD	%	TBD	%	TBD	%	TBD	%	TBD	%
Donga	TBD	%	TBD	%	TBD	%	TBD	%	TBD	%	TBD	%
Gashaka	TBD	%	TBD	%	TBD	%	TBD	%	TBD	%	TBD	%
Gassol	TBD	%	TBD	%	TBD	%	TBD	%	TBD	%	TBD	%
Ibi	TBD	%	TBD	%	TBD	%	TBD	%	TBD	%	TBD	%
Jalingo	TBD	%	TBD	%	TBD	%	TBD	%	TBD	%	TBD	%
Karim Lamido	TBD	%	TBD	%	TBD	%	TBD	%	TBD	%	TBD	%
Kurmi	TBD	%	TBD	%	TBD	%	TBD	%	TBD	%	TBD	%
Lau	TBD	%	TBD	%	TBD	%	TBD	%	TBD	%	TBD	%
Sardauna	TBD	%	TBD	%	TBD	%	TBD	%	TBD	%	TBD	%
Takum	TBD	%	TBD	%	TBD	%	TBD	%	TBD	%	TBD	%
Ussa	TBD	%	TBD	%	TBD	%	TBD	%	TBD	%	TBD	%
Wukari	TBD	%	TBD	%	TBD	%	TBD	%	TBD	%	TBD	%
Yorro	TBD	%	TBD	%	TBD	%	TBD	%	TBD	%	TBD	%
Zing	TBD	%	TBD	%	TBD	%	TBD	%	TBD	%	TBD	%
Totals	TBD	%	TBD	%	TBD	%	TBD	%	TBD	%	TBD	%

== See also ==
- 2023 Nigerian elections
- 2023 Nigerian presidential election
