= 2019 Taraba State gubernatorial election =

2019 gubernatorial election in Taraba State, Nigeria

- (Nigeria)
- March 9, 2019
- Turnout: 52.07%
Nominee	Darius Dickson Ishaku	Sani Abubakar Danladi
Party	PDP	APC
Running mate	Haruna Manu
Popular vote	520,433	362,735
Percentage	57.21%	39.87%
Governor before election
Darius Dickson Ishaku
PDP
Elected Governor
Darius Dickson Ishaku
PDP

The 2019 Taraba State gubernatorial election occurred on March 9, 2019. Incumbent People's Democratic Party Governor Darius Ishaku won re-election for a second term in 12 local government areas, defeating former acting governor and All Progressives Congress's Sani Danladi who won in the remaining four with a margin of 157,69[8] votes, and several minor party candidates.

Darius Dickson Ishaku emerged unopposed in the People's Democratic Party gubernatorial primary as the sole candidate. His running mate was Haruna Manu.

Of the 30 candidates who aspired for the governorship seat, 28 were male, two were female.

== Electoral system ==
The Governor of Taraba State is elected using the plurality voting system.

== Primary election ==
=== People's Democratic Party primary ===
The People's Democratic Party primary election was held on September 29, 2018. Darius Ishaku, the incumbent governor, who was the party's sole aspirant, emerged winner with 1,928 delegate votes out of a total of 2,000.

=== Candidates ===
- Party nominee: Darius Ishaku: incumbent governor.
- Running mate: Haruna Manu.

=== All Progressives Congress primary ===
The All Progressives Congress primary election was held on October 2, 2018. Sani Danladi, a former deputy and acting governor of the state, was said to have defeated nine other contestants to win the primary election polling 60,629 delegate votes out of a total of 107,387 from across the state's 16 local government areas. His closest rival was Joel Ikenya, with 11,772 votes. However, the results were contested by eight of the ten contestants who sought for its cancellation. The part's problems began earlier in the middle of that year. Danladi got cleared by an Appeal court.

=== Candidates ===
- Party nominee: Sani Abubakar Danladi.
- Running mate: .
- Joel Danlami Ikenya: 1st Runner-up (11,772 votes)
- Garba Umar: 2nd Runner-up (5,504 votes)
- Prof. Sani Yahya: 3rd Runner-up (7,299 votes)
- Bobboi Kaigama: 4th Runner-up (5,530 votes)
- Aliyu Umar: 5th Runner-up (4,638 votes)
- Ezekiel Afukunyo: 6th Runner-up (2,811 votes)
- Chief David Sabo Kente: 7th Runner-up (5,549 votes)
- Ibrahim Tumba: 8th Runner-up (1,828 votes)
- Kabiru Dodo: 9th Runner-up (1,783 votes)

== Results ==
A total of 30 candidates registered with the Independent National Electoral Commission to contest in the election. People's Democratic Party Governor Darius Dickson Ishaku won re-election for a second term, defeating All Progressives Congress's Sani Abubakar Danladi, UDP's Aisha Jummai Alhassan and several minor party candidates. Ishaku polled 520,433 votes representing 57.21% of total vote cast, Danladi 362,735 votes representing 39.87%, and Alhassan 16,289, from across the 16 local government areas. Meanwhile, prior to the election, the APC candidate got disqualified in court over improper declaration of age.

The total number of registered voters in the state was 1,777,105 while 931,539 voters were accredited. The total number of votes cast was 925,320, while the total number of valid votes was 909,716. Total rejected votes were 15,604.

Candidate	Party	Votes	%
Darius Dickson Ishaku	People's Democratic Party (PDP)	520,433	57.21
Sani Abubakar Danladi	All Progressives Congress (APC)	362,735	39.87
Aisha Jummai Alhassan	United Democratic Party (UDP)	16,289	1.79
Adamu Danbako Ibrahim	All Progressives Grand Alliance (APGA)	4,098	0.45
Musa Bah Kanawa	Young Democratic Party (YDP)	1,208	0.13
Stephen Bishi	Social Democratic Party (SDP)	743	0.08
Danjuma Umaru	National Rescue Movement (NRM)	730	0.08
Sani Saidi	All Grassroots Alliance (AGA)	594	0.07
Bello Mohammed	Progressive Peoples Alliance (PPA)	564	0.06
Kwaghkar Julius Mberga	Action Alliance (AA)	471	0.05
Faruk Alhaji Muhammed	Democratic People's Party (DPP)	265	0.03
Ahmadu Umaru Salim	Young Progressive Party (YPP)	249	0.03
Kefas Sule	ABP	194	0.02
Ibrahim Manzo Mohammed	African Democratic Congress (ADC)	168	0.02
Ahmed Bala Gassol	People's Party of Nigeria (PPN)	153	0.02
Japhet Magdalene Tobbi	National Action Council (NAC)	91	0.01
Banti Henry Haniel	Action People's Party (APP)	89	0.01
Umar Abubakar	Advanced Congress of Democrats (ACD)	85	0.01
Dahiru Yunusa Shagarda	Accord (A)	77	0.01
Ahmad Murtala Isah	National Democratic Liberty Party (NDLP)	77	0.01
Bala Kabiru	Allied Congress Party of Nigeria (ACPN)	69	0.01
Phillip Soje Shin	Mega Party of Nigeria (MPN)	69	0.01
Bagarmi Kamaludeen Muhammed Soje	Movement for the Restoration and Defence of Democracy (MRDD)	49	0.01
Issa Musa	Zenith Labour Party (ZLP)	45	0.00
Bala Danlami Adi	Labour Party (LP)	44	0.00
Paul Jamasuru Tankwa	Mass Action Joint Alliance (MAJA)	37	0.00
Bello A. Ahmed	Democratic Alternative (DA)	32	0.00
Utsumiu-Nyen Akin Ishaya Missa	Change Advocacy Party (CAP)	21	0.00
Abdullahi Rabsanjani	Grassroots Development Party of Nigeria (GDPN)	20	0.00
Sanusi A. T. Hamza	Freedom and Justice Party (FJP)	17	0.00
Total		909,716	100.00
Valid votes		909,716	98.31
Invalid/blank votes		15,604	1.69
Total votes		925,320	100.00
Registered voters/turnout		1,777,105	52.07
Source: INEC, Premium Times

=== By local government area ===
The results below were for the two major parties. The total valid votes of 909,716 represents the 30 political parties that participated in the election. Green represents local government areas won by Ishaku. Blue represents local government area won by Danladi.

County (LGAs)	Darius Dickson Ishaku PDP		Sani Danladi APC		Total votes
County (LGAs)	#	%	#	%	#
Ardo Kola	22,208		19,617		43,524
Bali	34,744		31,357		68,109
Donga	42,696		13,707		60,056
Gashaka	12,592		10,746		41,7708
Gassol	28,181		46,385		78,250
Ibi	13,630		18,616		34,105
Jalingo	31,917		58,511		95,164
Karim Lamido	34,892		44,480		
Kurmi	28,519		3,815		33,654
Lau	20,881		12,542		35,332
Sardauna	38,618		29,924		
Takum	50,562		14,014		67,366
Ussa	20,567		10,209		
Wukari	92,527		34,995		132,131
Yorro	16,278		6,712		24,943
Zing	31,619		7,105		40,724
Totals					909,716

== Aftermath ==
After the elections, the All Progressives Congress party expressed dissatisfaction with the outcome of the process and vowed to appeal the outcome, legally. News Agency of Nigeria, however, reported the All Progressives Congress filing a suit against the results of the governorship election at the Court of Appeal in Abuja, on September 20, 2019. While the victory accrued to Darius Ishaku was withheld, the appellant's suit was disqualified by virtue of the earlier disqualification of its candidate at the Jalingo Federal High Court on March 6, 2019. The Supreme Court also dismissed the appeal by the All Progressives Congress. The appeal court, nevertheless, declared the People's Democratic Party candidate, Darius Dickson Ishaku, the winner.
