= Laka language (disambiguation) =

The Laka language is one of the Sara languages of Chad.

Laka language may also refer to:

- Laka language (China), a Loloish language spoken by the Yi people of China
- Laka Lau language, a Sara language of Nigeria
- Lau language, a Jukunoid language of eastern Nigeria previously subsumed under the label "Laka"

== See also ==
- Lakka language, an Mbum language of Cameroon and Chad
- Lakkia language, a Kra-Dai language in China
- Laka (disambiguation)
- Lakka (disambiguation)
