= Mark Bako Useni =

Nigerian politician and former Taraba House of Assembly Speaker

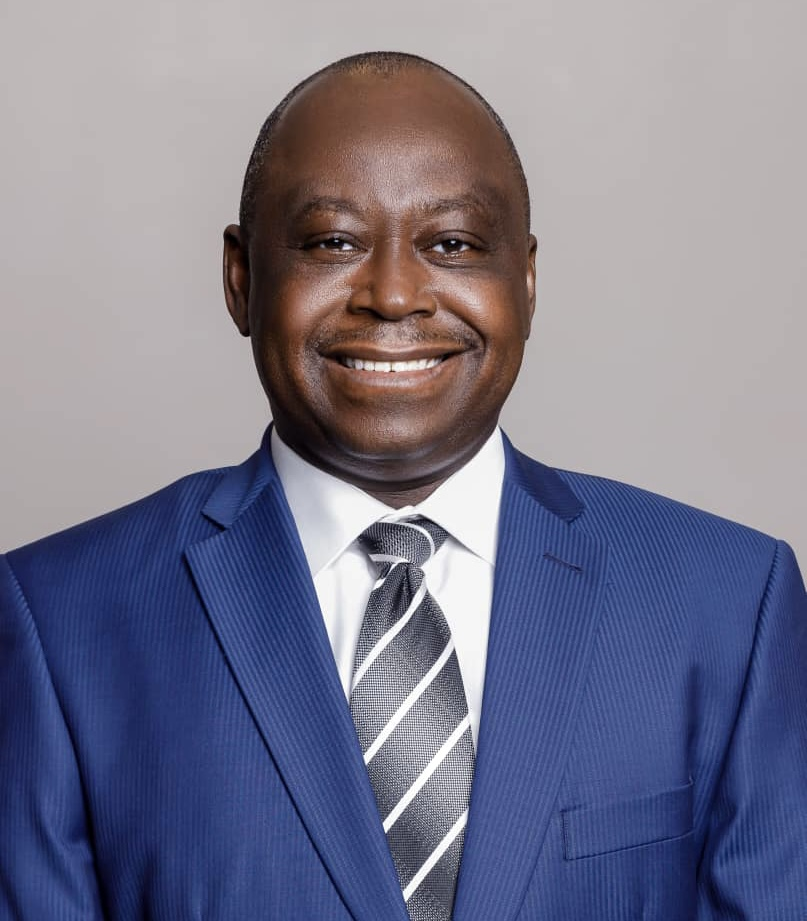
- Profile picture of Hon Mark Bako Useni

Member of the House of Representatives of Nigeria from Taraba
- Incumbent
- Assumed office 13 June 2023
- Preceded by: Rimamnde Shawulu Kwewum
- Constituency: Takum/Donga/Ussa

7th Speaker of the Taraba State House of Assembly
- In office November 2014 – June 2015
- Preceded by: Josiah Sabo Kente
- Succeeded by: Abel Peter Diah

Member of Taraba State House of Assembly for TakumII Constituency
- In office April 2008 – June 2023

Personal details
- Born: 30 June 1970 (age 56) Vom, Plateau State, Nigeria
- Party: All Progressives Congress APC
- Spouse: Christiana Mark Useni
- Education: University of Maiduguri; Benue State University
- Occupation: Politician; Entrepreneur

Mark Bako Useni, RT. HON (born 30 June 1970) is a Nigerian politician and a member of the All Progressives Congress, representing Takum/Donga/Ussa in the House of Representatives. He has served as the Speaker of the Taraba State House of Assembly in the 7th and 8th Assembly consecutively.

Useni has served in various capacities in both the executive and legislative arms of government. He is currently the member representing Takum II constituency and also the chairman, House of the Representatives Committee on Basic Education & Services in the 10th Nigeria National Assembly since June 2023.

== Early life and education ==
Mark Useni was born on June 30, 1970, in Vom, then Benue-Plateau State to Andrew Useni Bako and Pantuvo Useni of Bete in Takum Local Government Area of Taraba State. He began his educational pursuit at Salama Primary School, Takum in 1976 and completed in 1981; and progressed to Mbiya Government Secondary School, Takum in 1981 for his secondary education, finishing in 1986. He advanced to the College of Preliminary Studies, Yola between 1986 and 1988 for his A level certification and he later obtained a National Diploma in Mass Communication at the University of Jos in 1990.

Useni began a civil service career in 1993 when he was employed as a news reporter in Taraba Television. After five years, he secured admission and proceeded to the University of Maiduguri in 1998 for a bachelor's degree and completed in 2003, earning B.Sc. (Hons.) in Mass Communication. In 2004, he applied and gained admission into the Benue State University, Makurdi for a Master of Science (M.Sc.) Degree in Mass Communication and completed in 2007. While serving as a member of Taraba State House of Assembly, he applied and secured a postgraduate admission for a doctorate degree in 2009. He graduated with a Doctor of Philosophy (PhD) Degree in Mass Communication in 2014.

== Political career ==
Useni was appointed a Caretaker Councilor in Takum Local Government. After a brief stint as a councilor, he was appointed Special Assistant to the Speaker, Taraba State House of Assembly. In 2004, the Taraba State Government appointed him as the Sole Administrator of Takum Local Government following expiration of the tenure of elected council chairmen in the State. He later contested and was elected Executive Chairman of the Local Government Council within the same year. After his tenure, he was appointed Caretaker Chairman of the council for a short period in 2006.

Useni was appointed Commissioner for Health, Taraba State by the Danbaba Suntai led Administration in 2007, an appointment he later resigned to contest for the vacant House of Assembly seat for TakumII Constituency for the 6th Assembly. He won the election and re-contested the same seat in the 2011 general elections and was reelected into the 7th Assembly, a period during which he served as Chairman of the House Committee on Local Government.

Useni was elected Speaker by his colleagues following resignation of the previous Speaker and he served to the end of the 7th Assembly. Mark got elected to represent TakumII in the Taraba State House of Assembly for the third time in the 2015 general elections. On 4 February 2016, he was again elected Speaker of the Assembly, a position he later stepped down due to internal party arrangements.

Useni was re-elected into the Taraba State House of Assembly in the 2019 general elections to represent TakumII State Constituency for the fourth term.

He decamped to All Progressives Congress and contested for member Takum/Donga/Ussa federal constituency. He was declared winner of the supplementary election on April 16, 2023.

== Personal life ==
Useni is married to Christiana and they have four children; Nita, Jeffrey, Joshua and Eleora.
