= Joseph Kunini =

Nigerian Politician and Former Speaker of the Taraba State House of Assembly

Right Honourable Joseph Albasu Kunini

9th Speaker of the Taraba State House of Assembly
- In office December 2019 – December 2022
- Preceded by: Abel Peter Diah
- Succeeded by: John Kizito Bonzina

Member of Taraba State House of Assembly for Lau Constituency
- Incumbent
- Assumed office June 2011

Personal details
- Born: 20 March 1968 (age 58) Kunini, Lau, Taraba State, Nigeria
- Party: Peoples Democratic Party PDP
- Education: Lagos State University; Leeds Beckett University
- Occupation: Politician; Entrepreneur

Joseph Albasu Kunini, RT. HON (born 20 March 1968) is a Nigerian politician who was the former Speaker of the Taraba State House of Assembly in the 9th Assembly.

Joseph Kunini is a member of the Peoples Democratic Party who has been representing Lau State Constituency in the Taraba State House of Assembly since 2011.

== Early life and education ==
Joseph Kunini was born on March 20, 1968, into a simple and peasant but royal family of Albasu Kinjoh in Kunini, Lau Local Government Area of Taraba State. He enrolled into the then Local Education Authority (LEA) Primary School, Kunini in 1979 where he obtained his First School Leaving Certificate in 1985. He later gained admission into Government Day Secondary School, Kunini in 1985 and completed in 1991. He advanced to the College of Preliminary Studies, Yola in 1991 to 1992 and later proceeded to Lagos State University and graduated with Bachelor of Science in Business Administration and Bachelor of Science Industrial Relations and Personnel Management in 1998 and 2003, respectively.

He went further to bagged a Masters of Business Administration (MBA) in Industrial Relations and Strategic Studies from the Lagos State University and also Masters of Science (M.Sc.) in Corporate Governance from the Leeds Beckett University in 2010. He later returned to Leeds Beckett University to pursue his doctorate degree between 2012 and 2016 which earned him Doctor of Philosophy (PhD) in Accounting Finance.

== Political career ==
Following his voluntary resignation in 2010 from the Federal Civil Service, Kunini delved into the political arena, contested and won in 2011 as Member representing Lau Constituency in the Taraba State House of Assembly on the platform of the PDP. He served as Chairman, House Committee on Finance and Appropriation between 2011 and 2013 before he was appointed Majority Leader between 2013 and 2019.

In December 2019, he was elected the Speaker of the Taraba State House of Assembly following the resignation of the former Speaker of the house, Abel Peter Diah and Deputy Speaker, Muhammad Gwampo. Kunini was nominated by Bonzena Kizito, a member from Zing Constituency and was seconded by Ammed Jedua of Gembu Constituency. Sixteen of the 24 members of the house who were present elected Kunini speaker of the house unopposed.
