= Laka (disambiguation) =

Laka is a hero in Polynesian mythology.

Laka may also refer to:

== Places ==
=== In Poland ===
Łąka, a Polish word meaning "meadow", and the name of the following villages:

- Łąka, Lower Silesian Voivodeship (south-west Poland)
- Łąka, Nysa County in Opole Voivodeship (south-west Poland)
- Łąka, Olesno County in Opole Voivodeship (south-west Poland)
- Łąka, Silesian Voivodeship (south Poland)
- Łąka, Subcarpathian Voivodeship (south-east Poland)
- Łąka, Drawsko County in West Pomeranian Voivodeship (north-west Poland)
- Łąka, Goleniów County in West Pomeranian Voivodeship (north-west Poland)

=== Elsewhere ===
- Laka, Burgas Province, a village in Pomorie Municipality, Bulgaria
- Laka, Smolyan Province, a village in Smolyan Municipality, Bulgaria
- Laka, Tibet, a village in Tibet
- Lake Laka in the Czech Republic
- Laka, Bornova, a neighbourhood in Bornova, Turkey

== Other uses ==
- Laka (name)
- Elvir Laković Laka, Bosnian singer-songwriter
- Laka wood, a fragrant heartwood used for incense
- Lakana (boat), the traditional outrigger canoes of Madagascar
- Laka language (disambiguation), several languages

== See also ==
- Lakka (disambiguation)
- Lakas (disambiguation)
