= List of tertiary institutions in Taraba State =

Taraba is a state in the north east part of Nigeria with the slogan "Nature's Gift to the Nation".

Many tertiary institutions of learning exist there.

== Universities ==
There are three universities in Taraba state, one is owned by the state government, one by the federal government, and one is a private-owned university. The universities are:

- Federal University, Wukari
- Taraba State University, Jalingo
- Kwararafa University, Wukari

== Colleges ==
Colleges in the state are:

- College of Education, Zing
- Taraba State College of Agriculture, Jalingo
- Taraba State College of Health Technology, Takum
- Taraba State College of Nursing and Midwifery, Jalingo
- Peacock College of Education, Jalingo
- Muwanshat College of Health Science and Technology, Jalingo
- College of Health Sciences and Technology, Mutum Biyu
- De-Champions College of Health science and Technology, Lau.

== Polytechnics ==
Taraba State has two polytechnics, which are:

- Federal Polytechnic Bali
- Taraba State Polytechnic, Suntai
