= Tafarki Agbadu Eneme =

Nigerian politician (born 1961)

Member, Taraba State House of Assembly, Representing Kurmi Constituency
- Incumbent
- Assumed office 29 May 2023

Personal details
- Born: 10 January 1961 (age 65)
- Party: Peoples Democratic Party
- Education: Ahmadu Bello University
- Occupation: Politician

Tafarki Agbadu Eneme (born 10 January 1961) is a Nigerian politician and veterinarian. He is a member of the Peoples Democratic Party (PDP) and represents the Kurmi Constituency in the Taraba State House of Assembly. Eneme currently serves as the Chief Whip of the House and chairs the House Committee on Environment, Urban Development, and Forestry Potentials.

== Early life and education ==
Eneme was born into the Agbadu Wajigba Adamah Nkafwen royal family of Eneme village in Kurmi Local Government Area, Taraba State. He attended Local Education Authority (LEA) Primary School in Ndaforo, from 1969 to 1975. Eneme completed his secondary education at Ganye Secondary School between 1975 and 1980, obtaining his General Certificate of Education (GCE). He then attended the School of Basic Studies (SBS) at Ahmadu Bello University (ABU) in Zaria, from 1980 to 1981, where he earned an IJMB certificate.

Eneme graduated with a Doctor of Veterinary Medicine (DVM) degree from ABU in 1988. He pursued further education at the University of Maiduguri, obtaining a Master of Science (MS) degree in 2001. In 2011, he began studying for a PhD at the University of Nigeria in Nsukka, but discontinued due to his political appointments.

== Political career ==
Eneme began his political career when he was appointed Commissioner for Health in 2014 by the then Acting Governor of Taraba State, Alhaji Sani Abubakar. He served in this capacity until 2015, during which time he oversaw health sector reforms in the state.

From 2015 to 2019, he served as Commissioner for Works and Transport, during which he supervised several infrastructure development projects. In 2019, Eneme successfully contested for the position of Member of the Taraba State House of Assembly, representing Kurmi Constituency. At the Assembly, he chaired the House Committee on Internally Generated Revenue and served as Vice Chairman of the Public Accounts Committee.

In 2023, Eneme was re-elected to the Taraba State House of Assembly. He was subsequently appointed Chief Whip and Chair of the House Committee on Environment, Urban Development, and Forestry Potentials.

== Personal life ==
Eneme is married and has four children. He is from Kurmi Local Government Area in Taraba State.
