= Danladi Baido =

Nigerian politician

Danladi Baido Tijo is a Nigerian politician who has served as a member representing the Karim-Lamido/Lau/Ardo Kola Federal Constituency of Taraba State in the House of Representatives. He was the SPD Governorship Candidate for Taraba State in 2023.
