= Diah =

Diah may refer to:

== People ==
=== With the given name ===
- Diah Hadaning (1940–2021), Indonesian writer
- Diah Permata Megawati Setiawati Sukarnoputri (born 1947), Indonesian politician, fifth president of Indonesia from 2001 to 2004
- Diah Permatasari (actress) (born 1971), Indonesian actress
- Diah Permatasari (fencer) (born 1990), Indonesian fencer

=== With the surname ===
- Abel Peter Diah (born 1971), Nigerian politician
- Herawati Diah (1917–2016), Indonesian journalist

== See also ==
- Dia (disambiguation)
