= Ngada - (Ndola of Gola Area) =

Ngada, Nigeria Goh
- Special Development Area
- Motto: Home of Abundance
- Country: Nigeria
- State: Taraba State
- Capital: Sunkuru
- Special Development Area: 21 September 2016

Government
  - Type: Special Development Area
  - Coordinator: Hon. Felix Danfulani Garkera
- Time zone: UTC+1 (WAT)
- Postal code

The Ndola of Gola Area Development Association (NGADA) is a development area located in Taraba State, Nigeria.

NGADA is a region that overlaps five local government areas. These areas include Bali, Donga, Gashaka, Kurmi and Sardauna and have a combined population of over 34,000 as noted in the 2011 census conducted by Ndola of Gola Area Development Association. NGADA was formed to unify the Ndola residing in these five areas, into pursuing development together. It was formed by Joseph Nagombe Titus through the work of the Mambila Baptist Convention in January 2016.

== History ==
NGADA is an acronym for Ndola of Gola Area Development Association which was created by architect Darius Dickson Ishaku on September 21, 2016. The Association stemmed from the activities of Ndola of Gola Area Development Association, which is an umbrella Association formed and headed by Titus. The aim of this Association was to unite the Ndola ethnic group who were scattered across five local governments in Taraba, with a particular aim to focus more attention on the Ndola. This was achieved when the Governor of Taraba submitted an Order Act seeking the creation of NGADA Special Development Area by the Taraba House of Assembly.

The majority of the 116 villages under this development area are located in mountainous areas. Travel is difficult given a lack of roads. These people were first discovered by Anna Dickson Darius, wife of the Governor of Taraba.
