= Ndola people =

Ethnic group in Nigeria

Ndola people are found in Taraba, Nigeria and located in Kurmi and Ngada. Few are also found in Cameroon.

== Background ==
Ndola is a nation found in Taraba State, Nigeria with an estimated population of about one hundred thousand (100,000). Ndola are also found in Dodéo, Adamaoua Region in Cameroon and their population is estimated at 4,000.

Ndola is sometimes called by other people in Nigeria as Ndoro; Ndoola; Nundoro; while in Cameroon it is also called Njoyame. The Ndola language is one of the Mambiloid languages. Other Mambiloid languages which have similar phonology are: Mambila, Suga, Kwanja, Vute, Kamkam, Twendi and Wawa. Most of these languages are found around the Mambila Plateau region. Ndola people are also found in the low land areas of Kurmi which is their most dominant land, Gashaka, Bali and Donga. In Kurmi Local Government, the Ndola people owns its headquarters, which is in Ba'Issa. Ba'Issa is in two words: "Ba", a Ndola word, meaning Daddy, while "Issa" is a Hausa name meaning Jesus. The name of the first settler and owner of the land was called Issa. Whenever visitors want to visit him from other surrounding villages or communities, they will always say "We will be going to see Ba'Issa". This name was also adopted by the Missionaries who first visited the area in the early 1900. This is the name of the town used till date, and it eventually became the headquarters of Kurmi Local Government.

The Ndola are part of the large group of the mambila people. They together with the Chamba and the Tiv are the largest bantoids in Nigeria.
