= Abel Peter Diah =

Former Taraba House of Assembly Speaker

Right Honourable Abel Peter Diah

8th Speaker of the Taraba State House of Assembly
- In office June 2015 – December 2019
- Preceded by: Mark Bako Useni
- Succeeded by: Joseph Albasu Kunini

Member of Taraba State House of Assembly for Mbamnga Constituency
- Incumbent
- Assumed office June 2003

Deputy Speaker of the Taraba State House of Assembly
- In office June 2011 – October 2013
- Succeeded by: Tanko Maikarfi

Personal details
- Born: 1 June 1971 (age 55) Mbamnga, Sardauna, Taraba State, Nigeria
- Party: Peoples Democratic Party PDP
- Education: Federal University of Technology Yola

Abel Peter Diah (born 1 June 1971) is a Nigerian politician who is the former Speaker of the Taraba State House of Assembly.

Abel Diah is a member of the People's Democratic Party who has served in the Taraba State House of Assembly representing Mbamnga constituency since 2003.

== Early life and education ==
Abel was born on 1 June 1971 in Mbamnga, Sardauna Local Government Area of Taraba State, Nigeria. He had his primary and secondary Education in Mbamnga ward of Sardauna local Government in Taraba State. He studied business administration at the Federal University of Technology, Yola. While at university, he developed an interest in politics.

== Political career ==
Abel Diah started his political journey in 1996, when he was elected Councillor representing Warwar Ward, Sardauna Local Government Council under the Zero Party System. He was saddled with the responsibility of taking charge of Health and Natural Resources. Between 1996 and 1997, he emerged the Caretaker Chairman of Sardauna Local Government Council.

In 1998, he, alongside other like-minds, joined the People's Democratic Party in a group under the leadership of the former Vice President Atiku Abubakar from the People's Democratic Movement (PDM), the platform under which he contested and won the election into the Taraba State House of Assembly, representing Mbamnga constituency in 2003.

This purposeful representation has earned Abel the honour of being the longest serving Member in the Taraba State House of Assembly. He has been voted six consecutive times by his constituents to represent them.

He has served in various standing and ad hoc committees of the House of Assembly in different capacities. He won the confidence of his colleagues when they elected him as the 7th Deputy Speaker of Taraba State House of Assembly in 2011.

He emerged as the 8th Speaker Taraba State House of Assembly. Following the inauguration of the Eighth Assembly in June 2015 and was re-elected speaker in April 2016 after the declaration for a rerun election in his constituency election by the Court of Appeal Siting in Yola.

Abel resigned as the Speaker of the Taraba State House of Assembly on 2 December 2019 for personal reasons. Before his resignation, he was the Secretary of PDP Speakers Forum and the Deputy Chairman of the Conference of Nigerians Speakers Forum.
