= Lakas =

Lakas means strength, power in Tagalog and may refer to:

== Politics ==
- Lakas ng Bayan (English: People's Power), a defunct political party in the Philippines founded in 1978
- Lakas ng Bansa, (English: Power of the Country), a defunct political party in the Philippines founded in 1987, later succeeded by Laban ng Demokratikong Pilipino
- Lakas–CMD, a political party in the Philippines founded in 2009
- Lakas–CMD (1991), a defunct political party in the Philippines founded in 1991, started as Partido Lakas ng Tao
- Lakas–Laban Coalition, an electoral alliance in Philippines founded in 1995 between Lakas and LDP/Laban

== Name ==
- Demetrio B. Lakas (1925–1999), president of Panama

== See also ==
- Laka (disambiguation)
- Lakka (disambiguation)
