= Useni =

Useni is a surname. Notable people with the surname include:

- Jeremiah Useni (1943–2025), Nigerian army general and politician
- Mark Bako Useni (born 1970), Nigerian politician
- Nermin Useni (born 1980), Serbian-Kosovar Albanian football player
- Useni Eugene Perkins (1932–2023), American poet, playwright, activist, and youth worker
