= Simon Dogari =

Nigerian politician

Simon Dogari MHA, is a Nigerian politician of the People's Democratic Party. He is a former member of the All Progressives Congress. He has also served as speaker of the Taraba State House of Assembly.
