= Jude Rabo =

Nigerian academic

Professor Jude Rabo

Vice-Chancellor of Federal University Wukari
- Incumbent
- Assumed office 2021
- Preceded by: Abubakar Kundiri

Personal details
- Born: 21 June 1961 (age 64) Tadnum, Bogoro, Bauchi State

Jude Rabo (born 21 June 1961) is a Nigerian professor of veterinary medicine who currently serves as the Vice-Chancellor of Federal University Wukari, Taraba State Nigeria.

== Early life and education ==
Rabo was born in Tadmum, Bogoro, Bauchi State on 21 June 1961. He started his education at Tadmum Primary School from 1967 to 1975. He attended Gindiri Boys Secondary School, Plateau State from 1975 to 1980. Rabo studied veterinary medicine at Ahmadu Bello University from 1980 to 1986. From 1988 to 1990, he went to University of Ibadan, from 1995 to 1999, he went to University of Maiduguri and in 2001, he graduated from International Livestock Research Institute.

== Career ==
Rabo started his academic career as an Assistant Lecturer at University of Maiduguri, from 1987 to 1990, he became Lecturer II, from 1990 to 1992, he became Lecturer I, from 1992 to 1995, he became Senior Lecturer, from 1995 to 1998 he became an Associate Professor and in 2001, he was promoted to a full Professor in the department of veterinary pathology, University of Maiduguri.

He was head of the diagnostic unit, (pathology), veterinary teaching hospital, University of Maiduguri. From 1995 to 2005, he was deputy dean, faculty of veterinary medicine and head, department of veterinary pathology in University of Maiduguri. Rabo moved to University of Agriculture, Makurdi and served as head, Veterinary Teaching Hospital, dean, College of Veterinary Medicine and deputy vice-chancellor of academics.

He is a member of Veterinary Council of Nigeria, Nigerian Veterinary, Medical Association, College of Veterinarian Surgeons and technical associate, International Livestock Research Institute.

On 21 January 2021, Rabo was elected as the vice-chancellor of Federal University Wukari to replace Abubakar Kundiri.

== Personal life ==
Rabo is a native of Tadnum, Bogoro, Bauchi State. He is married with six children.
