= Abubakar Kundiri =

Nigerian university professor of soil science

Professor Abubakar Kundiri

Vice Chancellor of Federal University, Wukari
- In office 2016–2021
- Succeeded by: Jude Rabo

vice Chancellor of Al-ansar University, MAIDUGURI
- Incumbent
- Assumed office 2022

Personal details
- Born: Nigeria
- Education: University of Maiduguri
- Occupation: Professor of Soil science
- Known for: soil science

Pronunciation of Abubakar Kundiri

Abubakar Kundiri is a professor of soil science. He is the former vice chancellor of Federal University Dutse and Federal University Wukari, Taraba State, in Nigeria.

== Education ==
Abubakar Kundiri had his primary education at the ATMN Primary School, Gana-Ropp after which he went to Gindiri Boys Secondary School for his secondary education. He proceeded to University of Maiduguri in 1987 where he obtained his Bachelor of Science degree in agriculture and in the year 1991 he had his Master of Science degree in soil science with specialization in soil and water management from the same university. Prof Kundiri earned his Doctor of Philosophy (PhD) Degree in soil and water management at Cranfield University in United Kingdom. This was under scholarship from the European Union.

== Professional and administrative career ==
Professor Abubakar Kundiri started his academic career started at the University of Maiduguri as a graduate assistant. He attained the position of a substantive professor in 2006. Professor Kundiri has spent his academic and professional career working in areas to help address the challenges of Agriculture and Environmental Management. He has also been an External Examiner and visiting lecturer in a number of higher institutions and has participated in projects and programmes aimed at addressing environmental challenges such as, working closely with national and international groups including the European Union, World Bank, Unesco, International Atomic Energy Agency as well as Federal and State government agencies in Nigeria. With his background in education administration he is also serving in a number of committees of both Councils and Senates among others.

== Honours and recognitions ==
In addition, he is a member of the fellowship of the soil science Society of Nigeria. He was also the dean of students at the University of Maiduguri and the Federal University Dutse where he also held the position of deputy vice-chancellor. It was from this position that the Council of the Federal University Dutse appointed him vice chancellor of the university. It is a position he held until his appointment as the vice-chancellor of the Federal University Wukari by the president, Commander-in-Chief of the Armed Forces of the Federal Republic of Nigeria.
