= Lissam =

- Town
- Location within Nigeria
- Coordinates: 07°11′N 10°02′E
- Country: Nigeria
- State: Taraba State
- LGA: Ussa
- Time zone: UTC+01:00 (WAT)
- Postal code: 671
- Climate: Aw

Lissam is the Ussa Local Government Area headquarters in Taraba State in the Middle Belt region of Nigeria. The postal code of the area is 671.
