= John Bonzena =

Speaker of the 10th Taraba State House of Assembly

John Kizito Bonzena is a Nigerian politician currently serving as the speaker of the Taraba State House of Assembly. A member of the People's Democratic Party (PDP) representing Zing State Constituency, he was elected speaker of the 9th assembly on 21 December 2022 following the resignation of Joseph Albasu Kunini. Bonzena was re-elected speaker of the 10th assembly in June 2023.

== Early life and education ==
Bonzena was born to Alikali Bonzena Nonkuve of Yakoko ward in Zing Local Government Area of Taraba State. He received his primary education at Monica Primary School, Yakoko from 1967 to 1973 when he enrolled in government Comprehensive Secondary School Numan finishing with West Africa Examination Certificate (WAEC) in 1978. He attended then Advance Teachers College Jalingo (now College of education zing) from 1980 to 1983. He participated in the mandatory one-year national youth service corps deployed in Imo State between 1984 and 1985.

He began his career as a teacher in 1985 and remained in the job until 1994 when took a study leave to study chemistry in education at the Federal University of Technology Yola graduating in 1996 and later earned advanced diploma in public administration in 2004 and master in public administration in 2010 from same university.

== Political career ==
Bonzena was elected to the Taraba State House of Assembly to represent Zing State Constituency in the 6th Assembly in 2007 and was re-elected to 7th assembly (2011), 8th assembly (2015), 9th assembly (2019) and 10th assembly (2023). He served on various house committees and as chief whip of the 9th assembly. He was elected speaker of the assembly on 21 December 2022 after the resignation of speaker of the assembly, Joseph Albasu Kunini for personal reasons. He was re-elected speaker of the 10th assembly in June 2023.
