= Federal University, Wukari =

University in Nigeria

Federal University Wukari
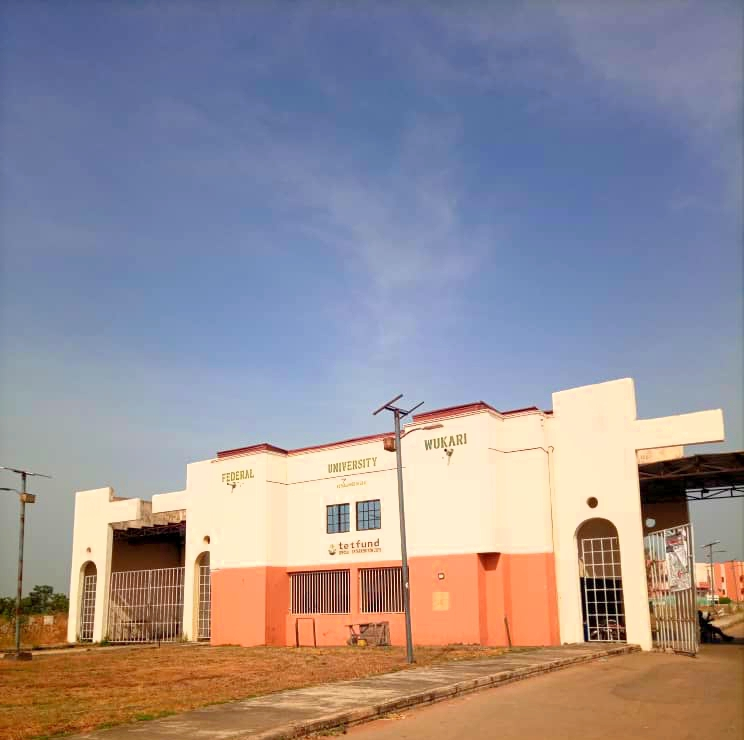
- Other name: FU
- Motto: Character, Excellence and Service
- Type: Public
- Established: 2011
- Accreditation: NUC
- Vice-Chancellor: Prof. Jude Rabo
- Location: Wukari, Nigeria
- Campus: Urban
- Website: www.fuwukari.edu.ng

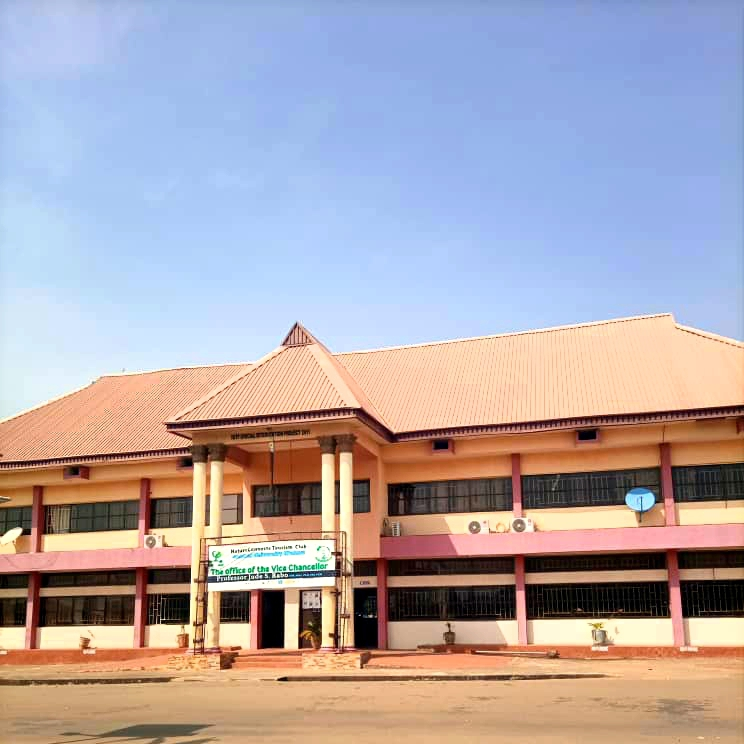
Federal_University_Wukari_17

The Federal University Wukari was established in 2011 by the federal government of Nigeria led by the then President, Goodluck Jonathan. The university was established as one of the nine set up at the time. Federal University Wukari is located in the town called Wukari in Taraba State, Nigeria.

== Faculties ==
Federal University, Wukari has six faculties comprising 25 departments:

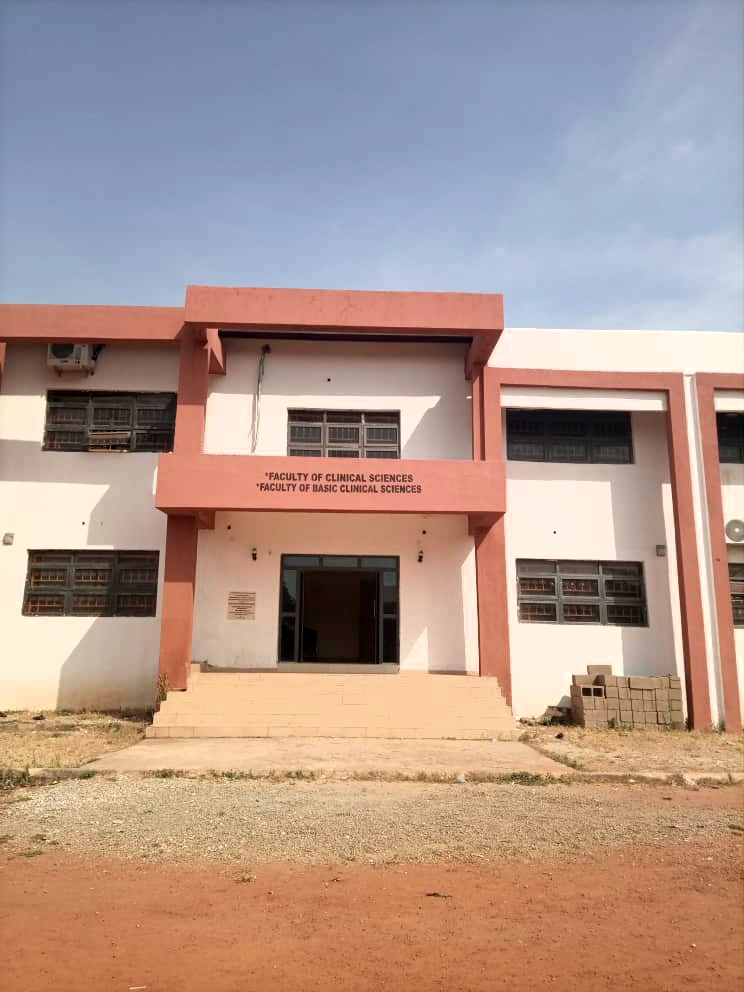
Faculty of Clinic Sciences

- Faculty of Agriculture and Life Sciences
- Faculty of Humanities, Management, and Social Sciences
- Faculty of Pure and Applied Sciences

== Vice Chancellors ==
The Federal University Wukari has since its inception had vice-chancellors who have been the administrative heads of the institution. The pioneer Vice Chancellor was Prof. Geoffery Okogba (2012-2016).

In March 2016, Professor Abubakar Kundiri was appointed as the 2nd vice-chancellor of the institution. During his tenure as vice-chancellor, most of the courses offered in the school became accredited.

Professor Abubakar Musa Kundiri was on seat as the vice chancellor for five years (2016 - 2021), until January, 2021 when Professor Jude Rabo, a veterinary professor, after undergoing series of screenings was announced as the winner and appointed as the new vice-chancellor of the institution to succeed Professor Abubakar Musa Kundiri.

== Ranking ==
Federal University Wukari has been ranked the 87th best University in Nigeria by webometrics as of January 2020.

== See also ==
- List of universities in Nigeria
- Education in Nigeria
