= Kwararafa University =

University in Nigeria

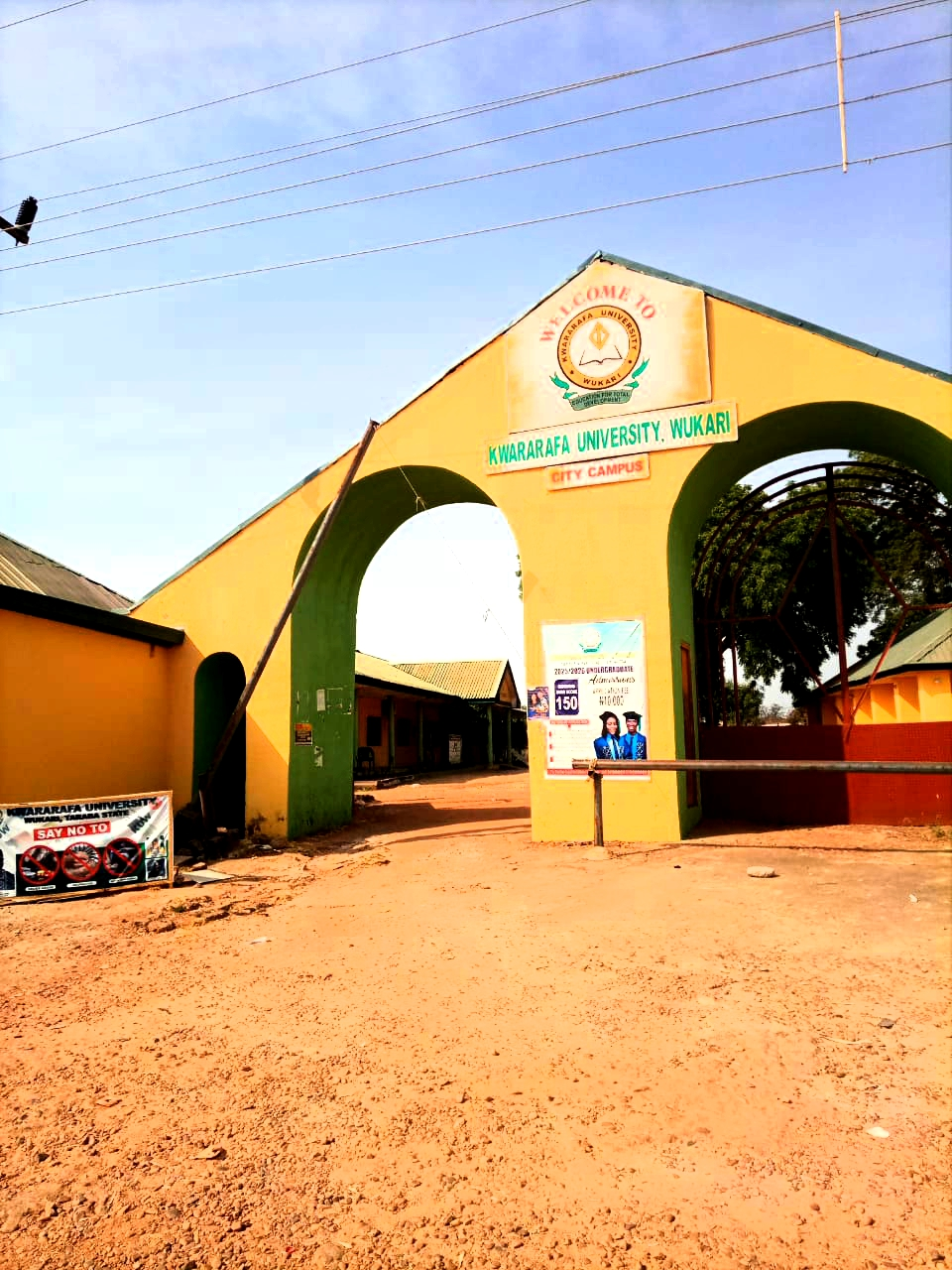
- Motto: Education for Total Development
- Type: Private
- Established: 2005
- Vice-Chancellor: Prof.Sunday Paul Bako Preceded by: Prof. Yakubu A. Ochefu
- Location: Wukari, Taraba State, Nigeria; 7°52′14″N 9°46′53″E
- Website: www.kuw.edu.ng

Kwararafa University is located in Wukari, Taraba State Nigeria. It was established in 2005 and is accredited by National Universities Commission.

== Courses offered ==
Kwararafa University operates three (3) colleges and each college has several academic courses that are accredited to it.

Below are the courses based on the college they belong to:

=== College of Management and Social sciences ===
- B.Sc Accounting
- B.Sc Economics
- B.Sc Business Administration
- B.Sc Political Science and International Relations,
- B.Sc Public Administration
- B.Sc Sociology
- B.Sc Criminology and Security Studies
- B.Sc Mass Communication
- B.Sc Geography

=== College of natural and applied science ===
- B.Sc Biology
- B.Sc Computer Science
- B.Sc Statistics

=== College of education ===
- B.Ed Educational Management
- B.Ed Guidance and Counselling
- B.Ed Human Kinetics and Health Education
