= Lau Laka language =

Central Sudanic language spoken in Nigeria

Lau Laka
- Laka
- Native to: Nigeria
- Region: Lau LGA, Taraba State
- Language family: Nilo-Saharan?: Central Sudanic; Bongo–Bagirmi; Sara–Bagirmi; Sara languages; West; Lau Laka

Language codes
- ISO 639-3: lak (deprecated)
- Glottolog: laka1252
- IETF: ksp-NG

Laka or Lau is a Central Sudanic language spoken in Nigeria. It is most closely related to Kabba Laka of Chad. The Hausa refer to the Laka people of Lau as Lakawa. The language was only recently documented in the mid-2010s, and had been previously misclassified as a Mbum language along with Lau.

== Distribution ==
Laka speakers live in Laka ward of Lau LGA (Hausa: Angawan Lakawa; formerly Garin Lakawa 'Laka town'), Taraba State, eastern Nigeria. They live alongside the Win Lau (or Lau proper; formerly Lau Habe), who are Jukunoid speakers.

== Lexical comparison ==
The following table compares Laka (Lau) and Laka (Chad), both of which are Central Sudanic languages, with Lau proper, a Jukunoid language.

English	Laka (Lau)	Laka (Chad)	Lau proper
animal	dā	/dā/	nɛ̃́wkũ̂
cow	mã̀ŋgɨ̄	/màngɨ̄/	nâw
chicken	kũ̄nʤá	/kūnʤá/	zǟw
man	ʤĩ̀ŋgàw	/ʤìngàw/	jĩ̂nə̀nwò
medicine	kũ̀mā	/kùmā/	gâj
