= Lau language =

Jukunoid language of Taraba State, Nigeria

Lau
- Law
- Wĩ̄ Lâwmã̄
- Native to: Nigeria
- Region: Lau LGA, Taraba State
- Language family: Niger–Congo?: Atlantic–Congo; Benue–Congo; Jukunoid; Lau

Language codes
- ISO 639-3: None (mis)
- Glottolog: None

Lâw
- People: Wĩ̄ Lâw
- Language: Wĩ̄ Lâwmã̄

Lau (Law) is a Jukunoid language of Lau LGA, Taraba State, Nigeria. Lau speakers claim that their language is mutually intelligible with the Jukunoid language varieties spoken in Kunini, Bandawa, and Jeshi. They also live alongside the Central Sudanic-speaking Laka (Hausa name: Lakawa), who live in Laka ward of Lau LGA.

Lau had been previously misclassified as a Mbum language along with Laka.

== Names ==
Names for the Lau language, people, and town:

- Town name: Làw (literally ‘mud’)
- People: Wĩ̄ Lâw ‘people of Lau’
- People (Hausa name): Lau haaɓe ‘the indigenous of Lau’ (from Fula haaɓe ‘servants, slaves, non-Fulani’)
- Language: Wĩ̄ Lâwmã̄ ‘the language of the people of Lau’

== Sample words ==
Some sample words in Lau from Idiatov (2017):

English	Lau
animal	nɛ̃́wkũ̂
cow	nâw
chicken	zǟw
man	jĩ̂nə̀nwò
medicine	gâj
