= Lake Laka =

Lake in Prášily, Plzeň Region, Czech Republic

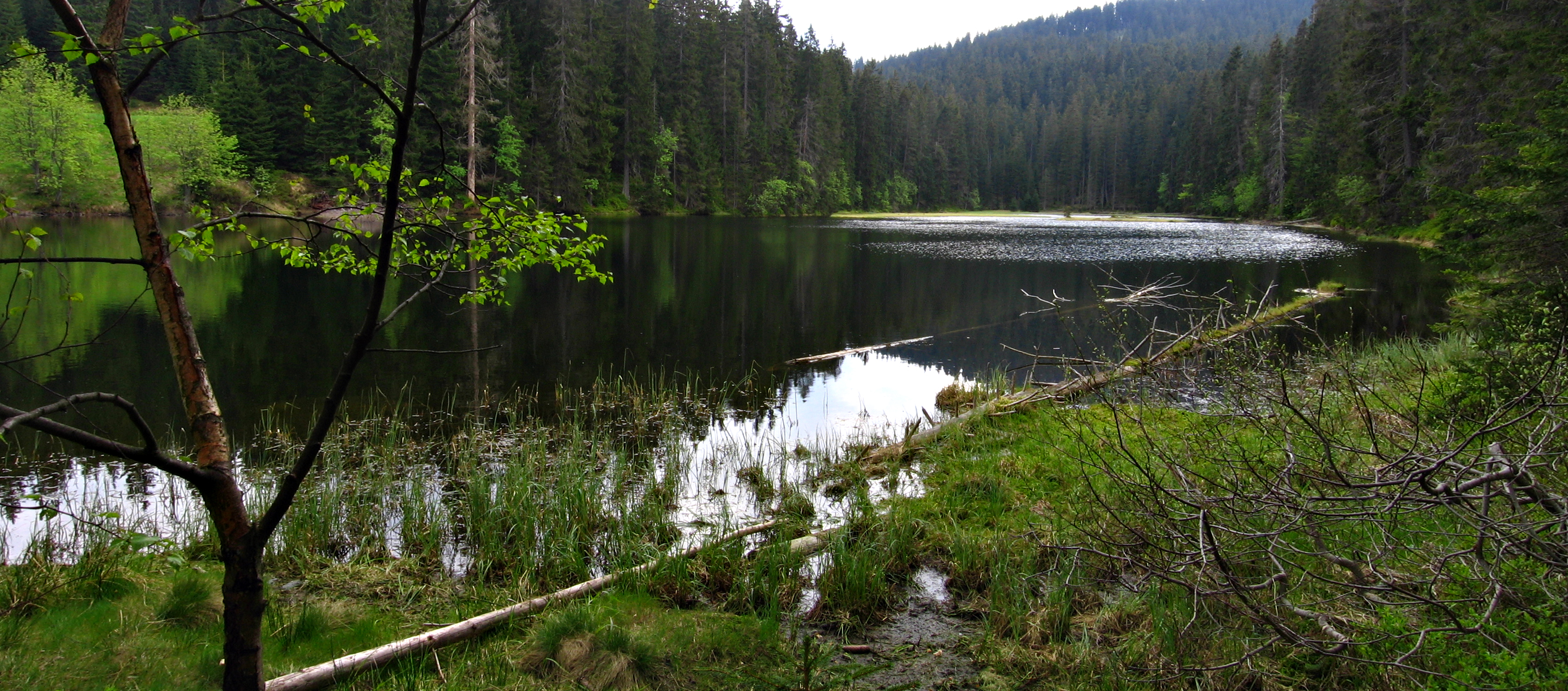

- Location within Czech Republic
- Location: Bohemian Forest, Czech Republic
- Coordinates: 49°6′38″N 13°19′41″E
- Lake type: Periglacial
- Max. length: 0.33 km (0.21 mi)
- Max. width: 0.09 km (0.056 mi)
- Surface area: 0.027 km^{2} (0.010 sq mi)
- Average depth: 3.9 m (13 ft)
- Surface elevation: 1,096 m (3,596 ft)

Lake Laka (Czech: jezero Laka) is located in the Czech part of the Šumava mountains. It is the highest and smallest lake in that area with a position of 1,096 metres above sea level and an area of 2.7ha. The lake is a part of the so-called glacial lakes of which there are five in Czech Republic and three in Germany.
