= Malle Aminu =

Nigerian politician

Malle Ibrahim Aminu

Member of the House of Representatives
- In office 2011–2019
- Constituency: Jalingo/Yorro/Zing Federal Constituency

Personal details
- Born: 23 September 1969 (age 56) Taraba State, Nigeria
- Party: All Progressives Congress
- Occupation: Politician

Malle Ibrahim Aminu (born 23 September 1969) is a Nigerian politician from Taraba State. He represented the Jalingo/Yorro/Zing Federal Constituency in the House of Representatives from 2011 to 2019. He was succeeded by Kasimu Bello Maigari.

== Early life and education ==
Malle Ibrahim Aminu was born on 23 September 1969 to Alhaji waziri Ibrahim Malle and princess Hureira Damburam Madu Mafindi. He completed his elementary education at Muhammadu Nya Primary School, Jalingo, in 1981. By 1986, he had obtained a General Certificate in Education (GCE) from Government Secondary School, Bali. In 1989, he earned an Ordinary National Diploma (OND) from the College of Agriculture, Jalingo. He obtained a bachelor's degree in 1995 from the University of Maiduguri. He proceeded to obtain a master's degree and a doctorate degree from the Federal University of Technology, Yola.

== Political career ==
In 2024, he secured the ticket of the All Progressives Congress (APC) at the primaries to contest again in the bye-elections for the Jalingo/Yorro/Zing Federal Constituency. Prior to his election to the House of Representatives in 2011, he served in other capacities as Commissioner for Transport and Aviation, Caretaker Committee Chairman of Jalingo Local Government, and Special Assistant on Local Government Affairs.
