= David Sabo Kente =

Nigerian politician and philanthropist

Chief David Sabo Kente
- Born: 3 March 1965 (age 61); Kente, Wukari, Taraba State, Nigeria
- Education: Accountancy (BSc); Business administration (MBA)
- Alma mater: Ahmadu Bello University; Modibbo Adama Federal University of Technology, Yola
- Occupations: Businessman, politician
- Political party: All Progressives Congress
- Spouse: Esther Sabo Kente

David Sabo Kente, popularly known as DSK (born 3 March 1965) is a Nigerian businessman, politician and philanthropist who is the founder and CEO of "DSK Group International Ltd" and the NGO "DSK Foundation". He was the candidate of SDP in the 2015 Taraba State Gubernatorial election before he joined the All Progressives Congress in 2016. He has once served as the National Assembly's director of finance. He is currently a member of the Northeast Development Commission (NEDC) and the chairman Board of Trustees of the Northeast Development Education Endowment Fund.

== Early life and education ==
David Sabo Kente was born on 3 March 1965, in Kente to the family of Sabo Ezeuhwe Kente who was the "Uhwe'Kenten of Kente", Wukari Local Government Area. He began his education at LEA Primary School in Kente from 1972 to 1978. He later progressed to Mbiya Government Secondary School, Takum in 1978 to 1983. He was enrolled into the School of Basic Studies, Ahmadu Bello University from 1984 to 1985 before obtaining his bachelor's degree in Accountancy from the same prestigious Ahmadu Bello University, Zaria in 1985 to 1988. He joined the Nigerian College of Accountancy from 1995 to 1996 where he earned the designation of a Certified National Accountant and became a member of the Association of National Accountants of Nigeria (ANAN). Between 2001 and 2002, he obtained admission and got a master's degree in Business Administration from Modibbo Adama Federal University of Technology, Yola, Adamawa State.

== Business career ==
In 2007, chief David Sabo Kente started the "DSK Group International Ltd" spanning hotels and real estate with a view of providing hospitality to meet the needs of an ever-increasing number of local and international business and leisure travelers in the world. He has multiple hotels all over Nigeria and one of the best hotels in The Gambia, Mansea Beach Hotel. His "Eldavido properties and Enggineering services Ltd" is the real estate company and is located in Ghana. He is also into oil and gas and agro-allied businesses.

== Political career ==
Chief David Sabo Kente contested for the Taraba State Gubernatorial seat in the 2015 general elections under the platform of Social Democratic Party (SDP) against Darius Dickson Ishaku of Peoples Democratic Party (PDP) and Aisha Jummai Al-Hassan of All Progressives Congress (APC). They lost to Darius Dickson Ishaku of PDP.

In 2017, DSK (as he is popularly known) decamped with over 25,000 supporters to All Progressives Congress (APC), which later led him to declare interest to contest again for All Progressives Congress′ ticket in the 2019 Governorship election in Taraba State.

David Sabo Kente has joined the race again to contest for the 2023 Taraba Governorship election under his party APC. So far, he has the likes of Abubakar Sani Danladi, Garba Umar UTC, Ezekiel Irmiya Afukonyo, Saleh Mamman, Yusuf Abubakar Yusuf, Danladi Kifasi and Emmanuel Bwacha to battle for the primary ticket under the All Progressives Congress platform.

== Charity and philanthropy ==
Through his ″DSK Foundation″, he has impacted and continued to impact the lives of the people of Taraba and Nigeria. His acts of philanthropy have offered over a hundred students scholarships over the years to help them further their education. He is also a significant donor to orphanages and has been disbursed foodstuffs to people on several occasions and during festive periods.

== Titles and honours ==
=== Traditional titles ===
David has been given the chieftaincy title of the Atavon Ekpan Nyifon of the Jukun people of Wukari, Kwararafa Kingdom.

=== Honours ===
In 2019, David was honored by the association of Taraba State Students Union (TASSU), Ahmadu Bello University, Zaria chapter with the award of Ambassador of peace and Societal Development and Icon of Humanitarian Services respectively. He was again given an award as Taraba State Man of the Year in 2020 by NewMission Magazine.

== Personal life ==
David is married to Esther and they have six children.
