= Lakka (operating system) =

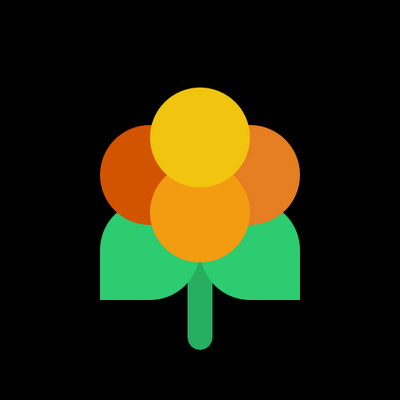

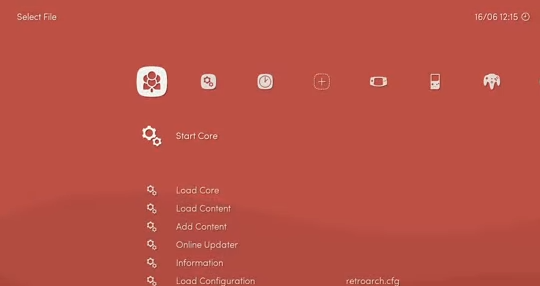
- OS family: Linux (Unix-like)
- Working state: Active
- Source model: Open-source software
- Repository: github.com/libretro/Lakka-LibreELEC
- Default user interface: RetroArch
- Official website: www.lakka.tv

Lakka is a community-driven lightweight retro gaming Linux distribution based on LibreELEC. It uses the RetroArch user interface. Lakka is especially suited for older hardware and for low-end single-board computers, such as Raspberry Pi.
