= 2019 Nigerian House of Representatives elections in Taraba State =

The 2019 Nigerian House of Representatives elections in Taraba State was held on February 23, 2019, to elect members of the House of Representatives to represent Taraba State, Nigeria.

== Overview ==
Affiliation	Party			Total
Affiliation	APC	PDP	APGA	Total
Before Election	2	3	1	6
After Election	2	3	1	6

== Summary ==
District	Incumbent	Party	Elected Rep	Party
Bali/Gassol	Garba Hamman-Julde	APC	Garba Hamman-Julde	APC
Jalingo/Yorro/Zing	Aminu Ibrahim Malle	APC	Aminu Ibrahim Malle	APC
Karim Lamido/Lau/Ardo-Kola	Danladi Baido	PDP	Danladi Baido	PDP
Sardauna/Gashaka/Kurmi	Danasabe Charles Hosea	PDP	David Fuoh	PDP
Takuma/Donga/Ussa	Rima Kwewum	PDP	Rima Kwewum	PDP
Wukari/Ibi	Usman Danjuma Shiddi	APGA	Usman Danjuma Shiddi	APGA

== Results ==
=== Bali/Gassol ===
A total of 7 candidates registered with the Uzo Independent National Electoral Commission to contest in the election. APC candidate Garba Hamman-Julde won the election, defeating PDP Adamu Maikarfi and 5 other party candidates. Hamman-Julde received 51.72% of the votes, while Maikarfi received 37.84%.

2019 Nigerian House of Representatives election in Taraba State
Party	Candidate	Votes	%
APC	Garba Hamman-Julde	54,739	51.72%
PDP	Adamu Maikarfi	40,050	37.84%
Others		11,049	10.44%
Total votes		105,838	100%
APC hold			

=== Jalingo/Yorro/Zing ===
A total of 17 candidates registered with the Independent National Electoral Commission to contest in the election. APC candidate Aminu Ibrahim Malle won the election, defeating PDP Hassan Bappa and 15 other candidates. Malle received 45.25% of the votes, while Bappa received 38.01%.

2019 Nigerian House of Representatives election in Taraba State
Party	Candidate	Votes	%
APC	Aminu Ibrahim Malle	61,077	45.25%
PDP	Hassan Bappa	51,306	38.01%
Others		22,581	16.73%
Total votes		134,964	100%
APC hold			

=== Karim Lamido/Lau/Ardo-Kola ===
A total of 12 candidates registered with the Independent National Electoral Commission to contest in the election. PDP candidate Danladi Baido won the election, defeating APC Bello Mohammed and 10 other party candidates. Baido received 51.78% of the votes, while Mohammed received 43.16%.

2019 Nigerian House of Representatives election in Taraba State
Party	Candidate	Votes	%
PDP	Danladi Baido	60,848	48.13%
APC	Bello Mohammed	54,571	43.16%
Others		11,011	8.71%
Total votes		126,430	100%
PDP hold			

=== Sardauna/Gashaka/Kurmi ===
A total of 11 candidates registered with the Independent National Electoral Commission to contest in the election. PDP candidate David Fuoh won the election, defeating APC Abdullateef Abubakar and 9 other candidates. Fuoh received 57.20% of the votes, while Abubakar received 40.97%.

2019 Nigerian House of Representatives election in Taraba State
Party	Candidate	Votes	%
PDP	David Fuoh	63,013	57.20%
APC	Abdullateef Abubakar	45,137	40.97%
Others		2,013	1.83%
Total votes		110,163	100%
PDP hold			

=== Takuma/Donga/Ussa ===
A total of 13 candidates registered with the Independent National Electoral Commission to contest in the election. PDP candidate Rima Kwewum won the election, defeating APC Alexander Atta and 11 other candidates. Kwewum received 62.43% of the votes, while Atta received 22.17%.

2019 Nigerian House of Representatives election in Taraba State
Party	Candidate	Votes	%
PDP	Rima Kwewum	73,258	62.43%
APC	Alexander Atta	26,015	22.17%
Others		18,064	15.39%
Total votes		117,337	100%
PDP hold			

=== Wukari/Ibi ===
A total of 20 candidates registered with the Independent National Electoral Commission to contest in the election. APGA candidate Usman Danjuma Shiddi won the election, defeating the PDP's Naphtali Kefas, AA's Yakubu Haruna Aliyara, and APC's Josiah Sabo Kente along with 16 other party candidates. Shiddi received 36.17% of the votes, while Kefas, Aliyara, and Kente received 22.61%, 20.38%, and 16.12%, respectively.

2019 Nigerian House of Representatives election in Wukari/Ibi Federal Constituency
Party	Candidate	Votes	%
APGA	Usman Danjuma Shiddi	39,312	36.17%
PDP	Naphtali Kefas	24,575	22.61%
AA	Yakubu Haruna Aliyara	22,147	20.38%
APC	Josiah Sabo Kente	17,522	16.12%
Others		5,133	4.72%
Total votes		108,689	100%
APGA hold			
