= Laka (name) =

Laka is a name.

== Surname ==
- Don Laka (born 1958), South African jazz musician, songwriter, and music producer
- Elvir Laković Laka (born 1969), Bosnian singer-songwriter
- Roger Laka, Papua New Guinean rugby league player

== Given name ==
- Laka Umaw (拉卡·巫茂, born 1969), Taiwanese Seediq singer
