= Lakka =

Lakka may refer to:

- Lakka liqueur, liqueur flavoured with cloudberries
- Lakka, Greece
- Lakka language, an Mbum language of Cameroon
- Lakka, Sierra Leone
- Lakka (operating system), a lightweight retro gaming Linux distribution
- Elmo Lakka, Finnish athlete

== See also ==
- Laka (disambiguation)
- Lakkia
