= Laka language =

Sara language of Chad

Laka
- Kabba Laka
- Native to: Chad, Cameroon and CAR
- Native speakers: (57,000 cited 1993 census)
- Language family: Nilo-Saharan?: Central Sudanic; Bongo–Bagirmi; Sara languages; West; Laka

Language codes
- ISO 639-3: lap
- Glottolog: laka1254

Laka, also known as Kabba Laka, is one of the Sara languages of Chad.

Laka of Lau, spoken in Nigeria, is closely related.

== Literature ==
A New Testament in Kabba-Laka was published by the British and Foreign Bible Society in 1960. It was translated by Brethren Missionary Mrs. Matilda W. Kennedy with the assistants of Pierre Ngondje and Paul Bobeta.
