= Joel Danlami Ikenya =

Nigerian politician

National Senator
- In office May 2007 – May 2011
- Succeeded by: Emmanuel Bwacha
- Constituency: Taraba South

Personal details
- Born: 17 July 1962 (age 64)
- Party: People's Democratic Party
- Spouse: Jemimah Joel
- Children: Zando Joel, Musa Joel, Siman Joel and Faith Joel
- Profession: Farmer and Politician

Joel Danlami Ikenya (born 17 July 1962) is a Nigerian politician who was elected to represent the People's Democratic Party (PDP) as Senator for Taraba South in Taraba State in 2007. He was reelected in 2007, then in 2011 made an unsuccessful bid for governor of the state. Senator Joel Danlami Ikenya was nominated as a ministerial nominee to replace Darius Ishaku who resigned to contest the Governorship election in Taraba State. In January, he was appointed the Minister of Labour and Productivity till May 2015.

== Background ==
Joel Danlami Ikenya was born on 17 July 1962. He has an Advanced Diploma in public administration, and was an undergraduate (business administration), at the Federal University of Technology, Yola in Adamawa State. He was a member of the Taraba State House of Assembly from 1992 to 1993, and again from 1999 to 2003, was a member Federal House Of Representatives from 2003 to 2007.

== Senate career ==
Joel Danlami Ikenya was elected to the National Senate for the Taraba South constituency in 2007 and he was appointed chairman of the Senate Committee on Commerce, and also sat on the Senate Committee on Appropriation from 2007- 2011. In May 2008, Senator Ikenya was appointed to the Senate committee to review the amendment of the 1999 constitution.

=== Sports ===
In December 2007, Ikenya was appointed to a four-man panel set up by Senator Heineken Lokpobiri's Committee on Sports to take action in a crisis that was then rocking Nigerian football. As a member of the sports committee, he blamed the Nigeria Football Federations for "ineptitude, corruption, inefficiency and total incompetence". He also accused the federal government of wasting N1.24 billion on a bid to host the 2014 Commonwealth Games, saying the money would have been better used in building sports facilities.

=== Political disputes ===
In June 2008, Senator Ikenya stated that President Umaru Musa Yar'Adua had not been prepared for the job when he was hurriedly pushed forward by former president Olusegun Obasanjo, but expressed confidence that Yar'Adua would find his feet. In December 2008, after the controversial dismissal of Nuhu Ribadu, former chairman of the Economic and Financial Crimes Commission, from the police, Ikenya said the decision was correct because Ribadu had let himself be used to track down opponents of former president Olusegun Obasanjo. In August 2009, he was invited to a meeting to try to resolve a political feud between the former governor of Taraba State, Reverend Jolly Nyame, and his successor Danbaba Suntai. Senator Ikenya was said to be a supporter of Nyame.

=== Trade ===
In March 2008, Ikenya called on the Ghanaian government to reopen shops owned by Nigerian businessmen, citing the Economic Community of West African States (ECOWAS) free trade zone agreement. In May 2008, he was among those who rejected a proposal to appropriate N80 billion for import of rice, saying the money should be spent on agricultural improvement, and that Nigeria should learn from countries which were turning deserts to green areas. In November 2008, he blamed the Nigerian Customs Service, Immigration Service and Nigeria Police Force for allowing counterfeit goods into the country, saying this had caused retrenchment of 75 per cent of workers in the manufacturing sector. In May 2009, he said Nigeria would not be rushed into signing the Economic Partnership Agreement aimed to liberalise trade between Africa and the European Union (EU), seeing a risk that they would flood the market with imports and destroy local businesses.

=== Finance and regulation ===
In June 2008 he was among those who successfully opposed introduction of a bill sponsored by Senator Iyabo Obasanjo-Bello for an act to establish the excess Crude Oil Fund, which would create an investment vehicle to bolster the country's financial strength in the future.

In June 2009, Senator Joel Danlami Ikenya urged stakeholders in the financial reporting sector to support the proposed Financial Reporting Council (FRC) Bill, which he said would improve accounting standards in the private and public sectors, and thus encourage investment. In September 2009, he said he fully supported the Corporate Affairs Commission in its efforts to build zonal offices in all the states of the federation, rather than using rental premises.
