= Speaker of the Taraba State House of Assembly =

- Incumbent; Rt. Hon. John Kizito Bonzina since December 21, 2022
- Style: Rt. Honourable Speaker
- Member of: Taraba State House of Assembly
- Residence: Taraba State, Nigeria
- Appointer: Members of the Taraba State House of Assembly
- Term length: 4 years renewable once
- Formation: October 2, 1999
- First holder: Rt. Hon. Istiphanus Gbana; May, 1999

The Speaker of the Taraba State House of Assembly is the political head of the Taraba State House of Assembly. Elected by the Members of the Assembly, the speaker's statutory duty is to preside over the sitting and deliberations of the Assembly.
