= Lau, Nigeria =

Lau
- LGA and town
- Nickname: Launawa
- Interactive map of Lau
- Location within Nigeria Location within Africa
- Coordinates: 9°12′N 11°18′E
- Country: Nigeria
- State: Taraba State

Government

Area
  - Total: 1,660 km^{2} (640 sq mi)

Population (2022)
  - Total: 149,700
  - Density: 90.2/km^{2} (234/sq mi)
- Time zone: UTC+1 (WAT)
- Postal code: 662

Lau is a town and Local Government Area in Taraba State, Nigeria. The area is dominated by Hausa Fulani people and has a border with Ardo Kola, Jalingo, Yorro and Zing local governments of Taraba state. It also shares a border with Numan, Adamawa State.

== Etymology ==
The name of the town literally means ‘mud’ in the local Lau language.

== Geography ==
It has an area of 1,660 km^{2} and a population of 149,700 at the 2022 census.

The postal code of the area is 662.

== Climate ==
The wet season is oppressive, with temperature ranging from 16 °C (61 °F) to 38 °C (100 °F) year round, rarely dropping below 13 °C (56 °F) or above 41 °C (106 °F). With an average daily high temperature of exceeding 36 °C (97 °F), the hot season spans 2.3 months, from February 6 to April 15. With an average high temperature of 38 °C (100 °F) and low temperature of 24 °C (75 °F), March is the hottest month of the year in Lau. The 3.5-month chilly season, which runs from June 25 to October 10th, has daily highs that are typically lower than 31 °C (87 °F). December is the coldest month of the year in Lau, with an average high temperature of 33 °C (92 °F) and low temperature of 17 °C (63 °F).

=== Cloud ===
Throughout the year, there is a noticeable seasonal change in the average percentage of cloud cover in Lau. In Lau, the clearer portion of the year starts about October 30 and lasts for 4.2 months, concluding around March 4. In Lau, January is the clearest month of the year with 53% of the sky being clear, fairly clear, or partly overcast on average. The cloudier portion of the year starts about March 4 and lasts for 7.8 months, finishing about October 30. In Lau, May is the cloudiest month of the year, with 81% of the sky being overcast or mostly overcast on average.

== Languages ==
Local languages spoken in Lau LGA are:

- Fulani language
- Hausa language
- Lau Laka language, a Central Sudanic language
- Lau language, a Jukunoid language
