= Ussa =

Ussa Askaen
- LGA
- Interactive map of Ussa
- Location in Nigeria
- Coordinates: 7°07′N 10°05′E
- Country: Nigeria
- State: Taraba State
- Established: 1996
- Seat: Lissam

Government
  - Chairman: Hon. (Amb). Peter Shenwun (PDP)

Area
  - Total: 1,495 km^{2} (577 sq mi)

Population (2006 census)
  - Total: 92,017
  - Density: 61.55/km^{2} (159.4/sq mi)
- Time zone: UTC+1 (WAT)
- 3-digit postal code prefix: 671
- ISO 3166 code: NG.TA.US

Ussa is a local government area in Taraba State, Nigeria. Its headquarters is in the town of Lissam. Ussa borders the Republic of Cameroon in the south; the Donga River forms its northern boundary. Ussa was created in 1996 during the regime of General Sani Abacha after an earlier attempt failed in 1983, Aticwo (kpambo), Rufu, Lumbu, Fikyu, Acha, Kpambo Puri, are some of the district councils within Ussa.

It has an area of 1,495 km^{2} (577 sq mi) and a population of 92,017 at the 2006 census. Kuteb people are the ethnicity located in large population here.

The postal code of the area is 671.

There are 11 Wards in Ussa local government area: Bika, Fikyu, Jenuwa, Kpambo, Kpambo Puri, Kwambai, Kwesati, Lissam I, Lissam II, Lumbu, Rufu.

== Climate/Geography ==
Ussa LGA is 1495 square kilometres (577 square miles) in size, with an average temperature of 31 degrees Celsius (87.2 degrees Fahrenheit). The LGA receives an estimated 1,450 mm (57 in) of rainfall annually and is located off the banks of the Donga River.
