= Taraba State House of Assembly =

Legislative arm of the government of Taraba State of Nigeria

- 9th Taraba State House of Assembly

Type
- Type: unicameral
- Term limits: 4 years

History
- Founded: 1999
- New session started: 2023

Leadership
- Speaker of the Assembly: John Bonzena, PDP since 2022
- Deputy Speaker: Haman Adama, PDP since 2019
- Leader of the House: Jethro Yakubu, PDP since 2023

Structure
- Seats: 24
- Political groups: Majority: People's Democratic Party (19); Minority: All Progressives Congress (3); Other parties (2)
- Length of term: 4 years

Elections
- Voting system: First-past-the-post
- Last election: 2023
- Next election: 2027

Meeting place
- Taraba State House of Assembly Complex

The Taraba State House of Assembly is a branch of the Government of Taraba State, which serves as the legislative house where all legislative decisions and lawmaking for the governance of Taraba State is emanating. It is a unicameral body with 24 members elected into the 24 state constituencies. The current Speaker of the Taraba State House of Assembly is John Bonzena from Zing constituency of Taraba State.

== 9th Taraba State House of Assembly Members 2019 - 2023 ==
Maijankai Charles Abihuda Member Karim1 Constituency 2019–2023

Kunini Joseph Albasu Member Lau Constituency 2019 - 2023

Gwampo Mohammed Danladi Member Yorro Constituency 2019 - 2023

Gayam Mohammed Umar Galadima Member Gashaka constituency 2019 - 2023

Aji Josiah John Member Wukari1 Constituency 2019 - 2023

Bonzena John Kizito Member House of Assembly Zing 2019 - present

Adamu Mohammed Member House Karim Lamido11 Constituency 2019 - 2023

Abdulkarim Mohammed Member House of Assembly Ibi 2019 - 2023

Yahaya Douglas Ndatse Member House Donga Constituency 2019 - 2023

Sabo Pius Member Wukari 11 Constituency 2019 - 2023

Sulaiman Abbas Member House of Assembly Gassol 1 Constituency 2019 - 2023

Diah Peter Abel Member Mbamga Constituency 2019 - present

Eneme Tafarki Agbadu Member Kumi constituency 2019 - present

Abdullahi Hamman Adama Borkono Member Bali11 constituency 2019 - present

Ahmad Jedua Dawud Member Gembu Constituency 2019 - 2023

Anderifun Timothy Habila Member Ussa constituency 2019 - 2023

Abubakar Yahuza Maidalailu Member Jalingo constituency 11 2019 - 2023

Bashir Mohammed Member Nguroje Constituency 2019 - 2023

Bukuni Dominic Nzinang Member Ardo Kola constituency 2019 - 2023

Garba Ajiya Samson Member Takum1 Constituency 2019 - 2023

Kaura Abbas Umar Member Gassol 11 2019 - 2023

Taraba Mark Bako Useni Member House of Assembly Takum1 2019 - 2023

Tafida Nasiru Usman Member Jalingo11 Constituency 2019 - 2023

Maikudi Gambo Member Bali1 constituency 2019 - 2023

10th Taraba State House of Assembly Members 2023 - 2027=

Hon. Happy Shonruba Member Representing Ardo-Kola Constituency

Hon. Veronica Alhassan Member Representing Bali 1 Constituency

Hon. Hamann Adama Borkono

         Deputy Speaker

Member Representing 11 Constituency

Hon. Bibonga Dinkomiya Nulamuga Member Representing Donga Constituency

Hon. Abdullahi (Chul) Musa Member Representing Gassol 1 Constituency

Hon. Umar Kaura Abbas Member Representing Gassol 11

Hon. Muhammad Batulu Katltume Member Representing Gashaka constituency

Hon. Suleiman Titong Abdul-Azeez Tanko Member Representing Gembu Constituency

Hon. Ibrahim Isa Bawa Member Representing Ibbi constituency

Hon. Umar Adamu Sarki Member Representing Jalingo 1 Constituency

Hon. Mairiga Usman Uba Member Representing Jalingo 11 Constituency

Hon. Mike Dio M.M. Jen Member Representing Karim 1 Constituency

Hon. Anas Shuaibu Didango Member Representing Karim 11 constituency

Hon. Akila Nuhu Rantiyo Member Representing Lau constituency

Rt. Hon. Peter Abel Diah Member Representing Mbamga Constituency

Hon. Cyprain Nelson Len Member Representing Nguroje Constituency

Hon. Tafarki Agbadu Eneme Member Representing Kurmi constituency

Hon. Tanko-Yusuf Abubakar John Member Representing Takum 1

Hon. Lamba John Member Representing Takum 11

Hon. Rikupki Joshua Urenyang Member Representing Ussa Constituency

'"Zikengyu Yakubu Jethro"'

         Majority Leader

Member Representing Wukari 1 Constituency

Hon. Angye Josiah Yaro Member Representing Wukari 11 Constituency

Hon. Kassong Kannoh Joseph Member Representing Yorro Constituency

Hon. John Kizito Bonzina

         Honorable Speaker

Member Representing Zing Constituency
