= Yorro =

Coordinates: 8.749986°N 11.616698°E

- LGA
- Interactive map of Yorro
- Country: Nigeria
- State: Taraba State
- Local Government Headquarters: Kpantisawa

Government
  - Local Government Chairman and the Head of the Local Government Council: Hon Dr Martina Anthony (Mrs)

Area
  - Total: 1,275 km^{2} (492 sq mi)

Population (2006)
  - Total: 89,410
  - Density: 70.13/km^{2} (181.6/sq mi)
- Time zone: UTC+1 (WAT)
- Postal code: 661

Yorro is a Local Government Area in Taraba State, Northeast, Nigeria. Its headquarters is in the town of Kpantisawa. The local government is dominated by Mumuye people which is the largest tribe in Taraba State.

It has an area of 1,275 km^{2} and a population of 89,410 at the 2006 census. The Local Government have the following major towns and communities: Kpantisawa, Pupule, Lankaviri, Kassa, Nyaja, Dila, Kajong, Kayya, Donkin, Gadda-Lasheke, Boboto, Nyaladi, Nyalapa, Dandikulu, Manang-kopo, Bolisabo, Jika, Manang-lakware, Kpantinapo, Mika, Santewa, Garin Malam Audu etc.

There are 11 Wards in Yorro local government area namely: Bikassa I, Bikassa II, Nyaja I, Nyaja II, Pantisawa I, Pantisawa II, Pupule I, Pupule II, Pupule III, Sumbu I, Sumbu II

The postal code of the area is 661.

== Climate/Geography ==
Yorro LGA has an average temperature of 29 degrees Celsius or 84.2 degrees Fahrenheit with a total area of 1,275 square kilometres or 492 square miles. The LGA is home to several hills and elevations as well as substantial forest reserves. Yorro LGA experiences an average wind speed of roughly 10 km/h (6.2 mph).
