= Wukari =

Wukari Ukari Waka
- City and LGA
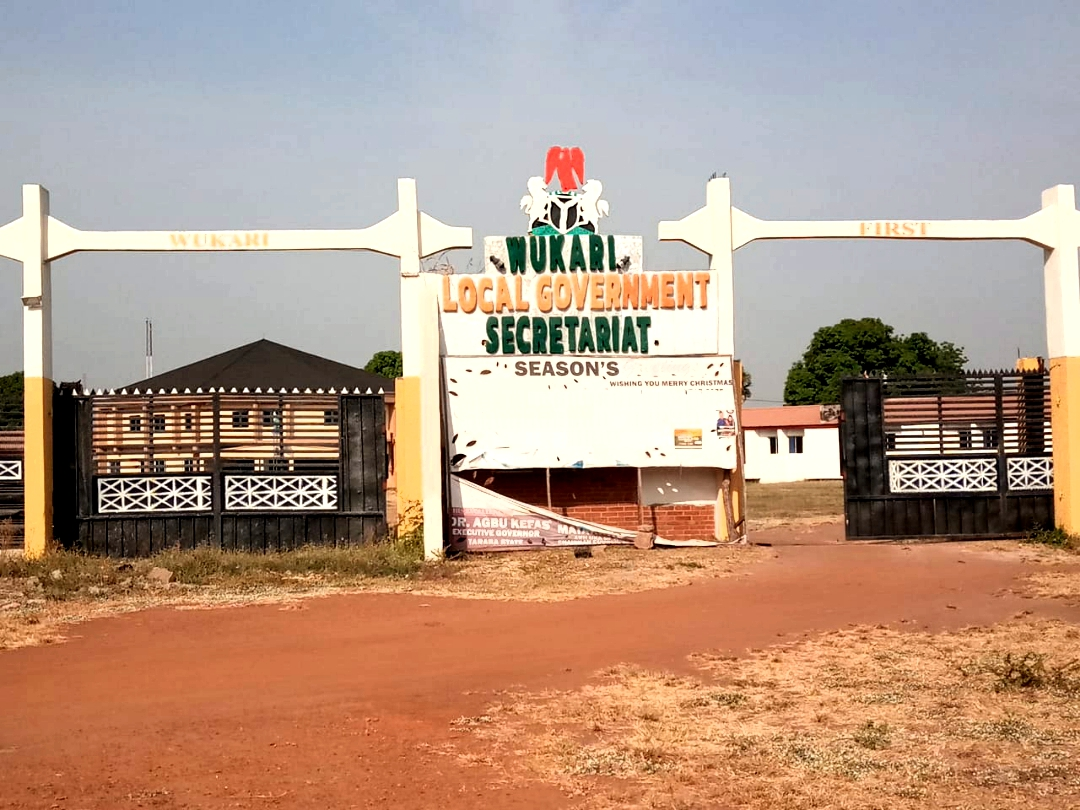
- Wukari Local Government Secretariat
- Nickname: Croc Town
- Interactive map of Wukari
- Location in Nigeria
- Coordinates: 7°51′N 9°47′E
- Country: Nigeria
- State: Taraba State

Government
  - Type: Democracy
  - Chairman and the Head of the Local Government Council: Samaila Agbu

Area
  - Total: 4,308 km^{2} (1,663 sq mi)

Population (2006 census)
  - Total: 241,546
  - Density: 56.07/km^{2} (145.2/sq mi)
- Time zone: UTC+1 (WAT)
- 3-digit postal code prefix: 670
- ISO 3166 code: NG.TA.WU
- Climate: Aw

Wukari is a city and Local Government Area in Taraba State, Nigeria. The Donga River flows through the area and the Benue River forms a boundary with Nasarawa State to the northwest. It has an area of 4,308 km^{2} and a population of 241,546 at the 2006 census. The postal code of the area is 670.

There are 10 Wards in Wukari local government area namely: Akwana, Avyi, Bantaje, Chonku, Hospital, Jibu, Kente, Puje, Rafin Kada, Tsokundi

== Wukari city ==
The city is the base of the Wukari Federation, a traditional state. It is the home to Jukun people. The local languages are Jukun (Wapan, Jibu, Nyifon etc), Ichen

== Climate ==
The dry season is humid and partly cloudy, resulting in hot temperatures all year round, while the rainy season is oppressive and overcast, rarely falling below 55 °F or over 98 °F. The hot season, which runs from February 5 to April 14, lasts for 2.3 months and with daily highs that average more than 91 °F. March is Wukari's hottest month of the year, with an average high temperature of 93 °F and low temperature of 73 °F. The 3.8-month chilly season, which runs from June 24 to October 16, has daily highs that are typically lower than 84 °F. December is the coldest month of the year in Wukari, with an average high temperature of 86 °F and low temperature of 63 °F.

=== Cloud cover ===
Throughout the year, Wukari's average percentage of cloud cover varies significantly according on the season. Around November 12 to March 2, or 3.7 months, is when Wukari's clearer season begins. With 48% of the sky being clear, mostly clear, or partly overcast on average, December is the clearest month of the year in Wukari. Starting about March 2 and lasting 8.3 months till November 12, the cloudier portion of the year begins. In Wukari, May has the highest percentage of cloud cover with an average of 83% of the sky being cloudy or mainly cloudy.

=== Daylight ===
The length of the day in Wukari does not vary substantially over the course of the year, staying within 34 minutes of 12 hours throughout. The shortest day is December 21, with 11 hours, 40 minutes of daylight; the longest day is June 21, with 12 hours, 35 minutes of daylight.

== Languages ==
The major Language spoken in Wukari LGA is Tiv and Wapan which are the indigenous language. Other languages spoken include Wanu, Jibu, Ekpan, Hausa, among others.

== Education ==
=== Tertiary education ===
The town has tertiary institutions such as:

- Kwararafa University
- Federal University Wukari
- National Open University of Nigeria, Wukari Study Centre
- Adigrace College of Education Byepyi, Wukari.
