= Kurmi, Nigeria =

Kurmi Jakwai
- LGA
- Motto: Home of Abundant Natural Resource
- Interactive map of Kurmi
- Country: Nigeria
- State: Taraba State
- Capital: Baissa
- Local Government Area: 1996

Government
  - Type: Local Government Area
  - Chairman: Hon. Moses Maihankali

Area
  - Total: 4,353 km^{2} (1,681 sq mi)
- Elevation: 265 m (869 ft)

Population (2006)
  - Total: 91,531
  - Density: 21.03/km^{2} (54.46/sq mi)
- Time zone: UTC+1 (WAT)
- Postal code: 671104

Kurmi is a Local Government Area in Taraba State, Nigeria. As a local government area it is administered by a Local Government Council consisting of a chairman, and elected councillors. The LGA is further divided into ten wards which are Abong, Ashuku/Eneme, Akwento/Bokko, Baissa, Bente/Galea, Bissaula, Didan, Ndaforo/Gwanda, Njuwande, Nyido/Tosso. Its headquarters are in the town of Ba'Issa.

== Population and location ==
Kurmi is bounded in the south by the Republic of Cameroon, in the south-east and North-east by Sardurna, Gashaka and Donga Local Government areas respectively. It is also bounded in the North by Bali and Gashaka Local Government, in North-west and south-west by Donga and Ussa Local Government areas respectively. It lies in an area of 4,353 km^{2} (1,681 mi^{2}) with the population of 91,531 based on the 2006 census.

Kurmi Local Government lies roughly between Latitudes 5° 31' and 7° 18'N, longitudes 10°18' and 11° 37'E at an elevation of 265 m (869 ft).

=== Vegetation ===
Kurmi local government Area lies on the south border with Cameroon and these areas are richly blessed with fertile soil which grows a number of cash crops and food crops such as Bananas, Plantains, Rice, Groundnuts, Oranges, Palm trees, Cocoyam and Cocoa. Others include Maize, Guinea corn and Sesame. Kurmi is also a producer of high quality Timber and the only Local Government with the state owned abandoned Timber Company which was called Baissa Timber Development Corporation.

In the North western part, is a grassland which also grows most off the cash and food crops. Majority of the populace being farmers, these crops are produced in large quantity for local consumption and the rest exported, either to other parts of the country or outside the country. While about 99% of the mountainous regions in the Local Government Area, are occupied by the Ndola ethnic group. The Local Government is also endowed with various natural resource including precious stones like gemstones, Forest, Water falls and Mountains.

=== Ethnicity ===
There are three Major ethnic groups which include:

- Ndola
- Tigun
- Ichen

The Ndola and Tigun people are the native ethnic groups that occupy the fertile woodland of Kurmi while Ichen people, occupied the grassland and Tiv farmers and Fulani herders also make up the population.

== History ==
Kurmi local government was created alongside Ardo-kola, Gassol, and Ussa local governments by the Late Gen. Sani Abacha’s administration in October 1996. Before the creation of Kurmi Local Government, it had endured a checkered history. On 1 April 1960, just some few months to independence and shortly after the then Premier of Northern Nigeria in 1959, Late Sir Ahmadu Bello (The Sardauna of Sokoto) visited Kurmi People, The United Hills Native Authority Was created. This was created alongside Gwoza in the present day Borno State, Ganye in the present day Adamawa State, Gashaka and Mambilla in the present Taraba State in fulfillment of the promises he had made during his visit. His politics was to expand the Northern parts of Nigeria and win the heart of the populace of these Trust Territories to join Nigeria and not Cameroon. In the end, it paid off during the 1961 plebiscite. Readers should also understand that, the first plebiscite in 1959 was a failure, because the people voted for deciding their future in a later date. This was the reason of conducting the second plebiscite in 1961.

The results of the 1959 plebiscite was a big slap to the Northern People Congress and to the French Cameroonian Authorities failing from their aspirations of winning these people or region. The Sardauna of Sokoto understood and vow not to treat the issue with kids gloves any longer, reflecting on the failed plebiscite and he never took it for granted when he campaigned vigorously to win the hearts of the people and he eventually won. These Native Authorities were baits that work so well because they were timely prepared. Kurmi remain a United Hills Native Authority from 1961 to 1971.

To the disheartening of the Kurmi People, ten years after, in 1971, the Native Authority was dissolved. Kurmi and Gashaka Native Authorities were merged with Mambilla. Gembu becomes the New Headquarters of the areas merged. Kurmi and Gashaka then became districts under Mambilla Local Authority. This was the advent of the Local Government System we experience today.

== See also ==
- Ngada
