= Ardo-Kola =

- LGA
- Interactive map of Ardo-Kola
- Coordinates: 8°48′N 11°12′E
- Country: Nigeria
- State: Taraba State
- Local Government Headquarters: Sunkani

Government
  - Local Government Chairman and the Head of the Local Government Council: Salihu Dovo

Area
  - Total: 2,262 km^{2} (873 sq mi)

Population (2006)
  - Total: 86,921
  - Density: 38.43/km^{2} (99.52/sq mi)
- Time zone: UTC+1 (WAT)
- Postal code: 660

Ardo-Kola is a Local Government Area in Taraba State, Nigeria. Its headquarters are in the town of Sunkani.

It has an area of 2,262 km^{2} and a population of 86,921 at the 2006 census.

The postal code of the area is 660.

== Climate/Geography ==
With a total area of 2,262 square kilometres (873 square miles), Ardo-Kola LGA has two distinct seasons: the rainy and the dry. The area's average temperature is expected to be 32 degrees Celsius or 89.6 degrees Fahrenheit, with an average humidity of 28%.
