= Gashaka =

Gashaka Serti
- LGA
- Nickname: Baruwa
- Interactive map of Gashaka
- Country: Nigeria
- State: Taraba State
- Local Government Headquarters: Serti

Government
  - Lamido: Dr Zubairu Hammangabdo
  - Local Government Chairman and the Head of the Local Government Council: Hon. Umar Yusuf (Aluran Gari)

Area
  - Total: 8,393 km^{2} (3,241 sq mi)

Population (2006)
  - Total: 87,781
  - Density: 10.46/km^{2} (27.09/sq mi)
- Time zone: UTC+1 (WAT)
- Postal code: 672

Gashaka is a Local Government Area in Taraba State, Nigeria. Its headquarters are in the town of Serti.

It has an area of 8,393 km^{2} and a population of 87,781 at the 2006 census.

The postal code of the area is 672. The Lamdo (Emir) of Gashaka is Alhaji Zubairu Hammangabdo Muhammadu Sambo. He was installed on 28 January 2017 after the demise of his father Alhaji Hammangabdo Muhammadu Sambo who had ruled the Gashaka kingdom for 51 years and died on 23 October 2016 at the age of 81. Fulani is the major spoken language in Gashaka and Serti town.

There are the 10 wards in the Gashaka local government area which is named: Galumjina, Gangumi, Garbabi, Gashaka, Gayam, Jamtari, Mai-Idanu, Mayo Selbe, Serti A and Serti B.

== Climate/Geography ==
Gashaka's climate is categorized as savanna (Aw), or tropical wet and dry. The district's annual temperature is 30.42 °C (86.76 °F), which is 0.96% greater than Nigeria's average. There are 147.74 rainy days (40.48% of the time) and about 100.97 millimetres (3.98 inches) of precipitation in Gashaka each year. Gashaka LGA is located in the tropical savannah zone and has a total area of 8,393 square kilometres or 3,241 square miles. The well-known Gashaka Gumti National Park is located in the LGA, which is next to the Mambilla Plateau. There are many mountains in the area, including the Gangirwal Mountains, which are part of the Gashaka Gumti Park. Gashaka Local Government Area (LGA) experiences an average temperature of 29 degrees Celsius or 84 degrees Fahrenheit and an average humidity of 38%.
