= Deputy governor of Taraba State =

Second highest-ranking official in the executive branch of Taraba State in Nigeria

Deputy Governor of Taraba State
- Incumbent; Aminu Abdullahi Alkali since 29 May 2023
- Executive Branch of the Taraba State Government
- Style: Deputy Governor (informal); His Excellency (courtesy)
- Status: Second highest executive branch officer
- Member of: Taraba State Executive Branch; Taraba State Cabinet
- Seat: Jalingo
- Nominator: Gubernatorial candidate
- Appointer: Direct popular election or, if vacant, Governor via House of Assembly confirmation
- Term length: Four years renewable once
- Constituting instrument: Constitution of Nigeria
- Inaugural holder: Uba Maigari Ahmadu (Fourth Republic)
- Succession: First
- Website: tarabastate.gov.ng

The deputy governor of Taraba State is the second-highest officer in the executive branch of the government of Taraba State, Nigeria, after the governor of Taraba State, and ranks first in line of succession. The deputy governor is directly elected together with the governor to a four-year term of office.

Aminu Abdullahi Alkali is the current deputy governor, having assumed office on 29 May 2023.

== Qualifications ==
As in the case of the governor, in order to be qualified to be elected as deputy governor, a person must:

- be at least thirty-five (35) years of age;
- be a Nigerian citizen by birth;
- be a member of a political party with endorsement by that political party;
- have School Certificate or its equivalent.

== Responsibilities ==
The deputy governor assists the governor in exercising primary assignments and is also eligible to replace a dead, impeached, absent or ill Governor as required by the 1999 Constitution of Nigeria.

== List of deputy governors ==
Name	Took office	Left office	Time in office	Party	Elected	Governor
Danjuma Gani (born 1934)	3 January 1992	17 November 1993	1 year, 318 days	Social Democratic Party	1991	Jolly Nyame
Uba Maigari Ahmadu	29 May 1999	3 March 2004	4 years, 279 days	Peoples Democratic Party	1999; 2003	Jolly Nyame
Armanyau Abubakar	4 March 2004	29 May 2007	3 years, 86 days	Peoples Democratic Party		Jolly Nyame
Sani Danladi (born 1968)	29 May 2007	4 October 2012	5 years, 128 days	Peoples Democratic Party	2007; 2011	Danbaba Suntai
Garba Umar	5 October 2012	21 November 2014	2 years, 47 days	Peoples Democratic Party		Danbaba Suntai
Sani Danladi (born 1968)	22 November 2014	29 May 2015	188 days	Peoples Democratic Party		Danbaba Suntai
Haruna Manu (born 1973)	29 May 2015	29 May 2023	8 years	Peoples Democratic Party	2015; 2019	Darius Ishaku
Aminu Abdullahi Alkali (born 1961)	29 May 2023	Incumbent	3 years, 101 days	Peoples Democratic Party	2023	Agbu Kefas

== See also ==
- List of governors of Taraba State
