= 2003 Nigerian parliamentary election =

Parliamentary elections were held in Nigeria on 12 April 2003. The result was a victory for the ruling People's Democratic Party, which won 76 of the 109 Senate seats and 223 of the 360 House seats. Voter turnout was 50%.

== Results ==
=== Senate ===
Party	Votes	%	Seats	+/–
People's Democratic Party	15,585,538	53.69	76	+17
All Nigeria Peoples Party	8,091,783	27.87	27	−2
Alliance for Democracy	2,828,082	9.74	6	−14
United Nigeria People's Party	789,705	2.72	0	New
National Democratic Party	459,462	1.58	0	New
All Progressives Grand Alliance	429,073	1.48	0	New
People's Redemption Party	204,929	0.71	0	New
Other parties	641,535	2.21	0	–
Total	29,030,107	100.00	109	0
Valid votes	29,030,107	96.78		
Invalid/blank votes	965,064	3.22		
Total votes	29,995,171	100.00		
Registered voters/turnout	60,823,022	49.32		
Source: African Elections Database

=== House of Representatives ===
Party	Votes	%	Seats	+/–
People's Democratic Party	15,927,807	54.49	223	+17
All Nigeria Peoples Party	8,021,531	27.44	96	+22
Alliance for Democracy	2,711,972	9.28	34	−34
United Nigeria People's Party	803,432	2.75	2	New
National Democratic Party	561,161	1.92	1	New
All Progressives Grand Alliance	397,147	1.36	2	New
People's Redemption Party	96,550	0.33	1	New
Other parties	713,470	2.44	0	–
Vacant			1	–
Total	29,233,070	100.00	360	0
Valid votes	29,233,070	96.20		
Invalid/blank votes	1,153,200	3.80		
Total votes	30,386,270	100.00		
Registered voters/turnout	60,823,022	49.96		
Source: African Elections Database

==== Results by state ====
- Bayelsa State
- Federal Capital Territory
- Kwara State
- Nasarawa State
- Taraba State
