= 2007 Nigerian Senate elections in Taraba State =

The 2007 Nigerian Senate election in Taraba State was held on 21 April 2007, to elect members of the Nigerian Senate to represent Taraba State. Dahiru Bako representing Taraba Central, Joel Danlami Ikenya representing Taraba South and Anthony George Manzo representing Taraba North all won on the platform of the People's Democratic Party.

== Overview ==
Affiliation	Party		Total
Affiliation	ANPP	PDP	Total
Before Election	1	2	3
After Election	0	3	3

== Summary ==
District	Incumbent	Party	Elected Senator	Party
Taraba Central	Abdulazeez Ibrahim	PDP	Dahiru Bako	PDP
Taraba South	Dalhatu Umaru Sangari	PDP	Joel Danlami Ikenya	PDP
Taraba North	Abdulahi Bala Adamu	ANPP	Anthony George Manzo	PDP

== Results ==
=== Taraba Central ===
The election was won by Dahiru Bako of the Peoples Democratic Party (Nigeria).

2007 Nigerian Senate election in Taraba State
Party	Candidate	Votes	%
PDP	Dahiru Bako		
Total votes			
PDP hold			

=== Taraba South ===
The election was won by Joel Danlami Ikenya of the Peoples Democratic Party (Nigeria).

2007 Nigerian Senate election in Taraba State
Party	Candidate	Votes	%
PDP	Joel Danlami Ikenya		
Total votes			
PDP hold			

=== Taraba North ===
The election was won by Anthony George Manzo of the Peoples Democratic Party (Nigeria).

2007 Nigerian Senate election in Taraba State
Party	Candidate	Votes	%
PDP	Anthony George Manzo		
Total votes			
PDP hold			
