= List of governors of Taraba State =

Governor of Taraba State
- Incumbent; Agbu Kefas since 29 May 2023
- Government of Taraba State
- Style: Governor (informal); His Excellency or Your Excellency (courtesy)
- Member of: Executive Council of Taraba State
- Reports to: President of Nigeria
- Seat: Jalingo
- Appointer: Popular vote
- Term length: Four years, renewable once consecutively
- Constituting instrument: Constitution of Nigeria
- Inaugural holder: Jolly Nyame
- Formation: January 1992
- Deputy: Deputy governor of Taraba State
- Website: tarabastate.gov.ng

Location of Taraba State in Nigeria

Taraba State, located in eastern Nigeria along the border with Cameroon, has been governed by military administrators and elected governors since its creation in 1991. Before then, the territory formed part of Gongola State, which was created on 3 February 1976 from the former Adamawa and Sardauna provinces of North-Eastern State and the Wukari division of Benue-Plateau State, with Yola as its capital. Gongola State was divided on 27 August 1991 to create the present-day Adamawa and Taraba states.

Taraba was initially administered by Adeyemi Afolahan before the start of the Third Republic. Jolly Nyame of the Social Democratic Party (SDP) then became the state's first elected governor, serving from January 1992 until the November 1993 coup. Military administrators subsequently governed the state until 1999, including Yohanna Dickson, Amen Edore Oyakhire, and Aina Owoniyi. With the return to civilian rule under the Fourth Republic in 1999, Nyame returned as governor on the platform of the Peoples Democratic Party (PDP) and served until 2007. He was succeeded by Danbaba Suntai, who held office from 2007 to 2015. Suntai's incapacitation after an aircraft crash in October 2012 led to a succession dispute in which Garba Umar and Sani Danladi served as acting governor. Darius Ishaku served as governor from 2015 to 2023. The incumbent, Agbu Kefas, was elected in 2023 as the PDP candidate and joined the All Progressives Congress (APC) in January 2026.

== List of governors ==
=== Gongola State ===
Gongola State was created on 3 February 1976 during the nationwide state-creation exercise of the military government of Murtala Mohammed. It incorporated the former Adamawa and Sardauna provinces of North-Eastern State and the Wukari Division of Benue-Plateau State, with Yola as its capital. The state existed until 27 August 1991, when it was divided into the present-day Adamawa and Taraba states.

The first military governor of Gongola State was Mohammed Jega, who served from March 1976 to July 1978. He was succeeded by Abdul Rahman Mamudu, who remained in office until the restoration of civilian rule in October 1979. During the Second Republic, Abubakar Barde of the Great Nigeria People's Party (GNPP) became the state's first elected civilian governor. Barde's deputy, Wilberforce Juta, became governor on 6 May 1983 and served until 30 September 1983. Bamanga Tukur of the National Party of Nigeria (NPN) then became governor after winning the 1983 gubernatorial election, but his tenure ended with the December 1983 coup. Military rule resumed in January 1984, with Jega returning as military governor until August 1985. He was followed by Yohanna Madaki (1985–1986), Jonah David Jang (1986–1987), Isa Mohammed (1987–1989), and Abubakar Salihu (1989–1992). Salihu was the final governor of Gongola State and became the first governor of Adamawa State when Gongola was split in August 1991.

=== Taraba State ===
Taraba State was created in 1991 from the former Gongola State, with Jalingo as its capital. Located in eastern Nigeria along the border with Cameroon, it forms part of the Middle Belt and has an economy based on agriculture, fishing, herding, and logging. During the Third Republic, Jolly Nyame of the Peoples Democratic Party (PDP) became the state's first elected governor and served until the November 1993 coup. Military administrators who governed the state after the return of military rule included Yohanna Dickson, Amen Edore Oyakhire, and Aina Owoniyi.

Following the return to civilian rule with the Fourth Republic in 1999, Nyame returned as governor. He was succeeded in 2007 by Danbaba Suntai. Suntai's period in office was followed by a succession crisis involving Garba Umar and Sani Danladi. After Suntai's incapacitating plane crash in October 2012, a power struggle developed between loyalists described as a "cabal" and Umar, the acting governor who had replaced the impeached Danladi. The Supreme Court resolved the crisis in November 2014 by reinstating Danladi and ruling his 2012 impeachment unconstitutional. Danladi subsequently annulled actions taken by Umar. The office passed to Darius Ishaku in 2015, and he served until 2023. Agbu Kefas was elected on the platform of the Peoples Democratic Party in 2023. In January 2026, while still in office, he defected to the All Progressives Congress.

Heads of the government of Taraba State
Governor		Term in office (Note: For elected governors, the date of inauguration is listed.)	Party	Election	D. Governor
—	Adeyemi Ambrose Afolahan (b. 1949)	28 August 1991 – 2 January 1992	Military administrator	—	Office did not exist
—	Jolly Tavoro Nyame (b. 1955)	2 January 1992 – 17 November 1993	SDP	1991	Danjuma Gani
—	Yohanna Mamman Dickson (b. 1950, d. 2015)	9 December 1993 – 22 August 1996	Military administrator	—	Office abolished
—	Amen Edore Oyakhire (b. 1945)	August 1996 – August 1998	Military administrator	—	Office abolished
—	Aina Joseph Owoniyi	August 1998 – 29 May 1999	Military administrator	—	Office abolished
—	Jolly Tavoro Nyame (b. 1955)	29 May 1999 – 29 May 2007	PDP	1999; 2003	Uba Maigari Ahmadu (1999–2004, Impeached)
—	Jolly Tavoro Nyame (b. 1955)	29 May 1999 – 29 May 2007	PDP	1999; 2003	Armaya'u Abubakar Dauda (2004–2007)
—	Danbaba Suntai (b. 1961, d. 2017) Incapacitated	29 May 2007 – 29 May 2015	PDP	2007; 2011	Sani Danladi (29 May 2007 – 21 November 2014, Impeached) (Note: Although Umar served de facto as deputy governor and acting governor from 2012 to 2014, the Supreme Court later held that Danladi had remained deputy governor throughout and that his removal had only interrupted, rather than terminated, his tenure.)
—	Danbaba Suntai (b. 1961, d. 2017) Incapacitated	29 May 2007 – 29 May 2015	PDP	2007; 2011	Garba Umar (5 October 2012 – 14 November 2012) (Note: Served as acting governor after Suntai's incapacitation)
Garba Umar wearing glasses, a traditional cap and attire	Garba Umar Sacked	14 November 2012 – 21 November 2014	Acting governor	—	—
—	Sani Abubakar Danladi (b. 1968)	21 November 2014 – 29 May 2015	Acting governor	—	—
—	Darius Dickson Ishaku (b. 1954)	29 May 2015 – 29 May 2023	PDP	2015; 2019	Haruna Manu
—	Agbu Kefas (b. 1970)	29 May 2023 – Incumbent	PDP	2023	Aminu Abdullahi Alkali
—	Agbu Kefas (b. 1970)	29 May 2023 – Incumbent	APC (since January 2026)	2023	Aminu Abdullahi Alkali

== See also ==
- List of state governors of Nigeria
