= Aisha Alhassan =

Nigerian lawyer and politician (1959–2021)

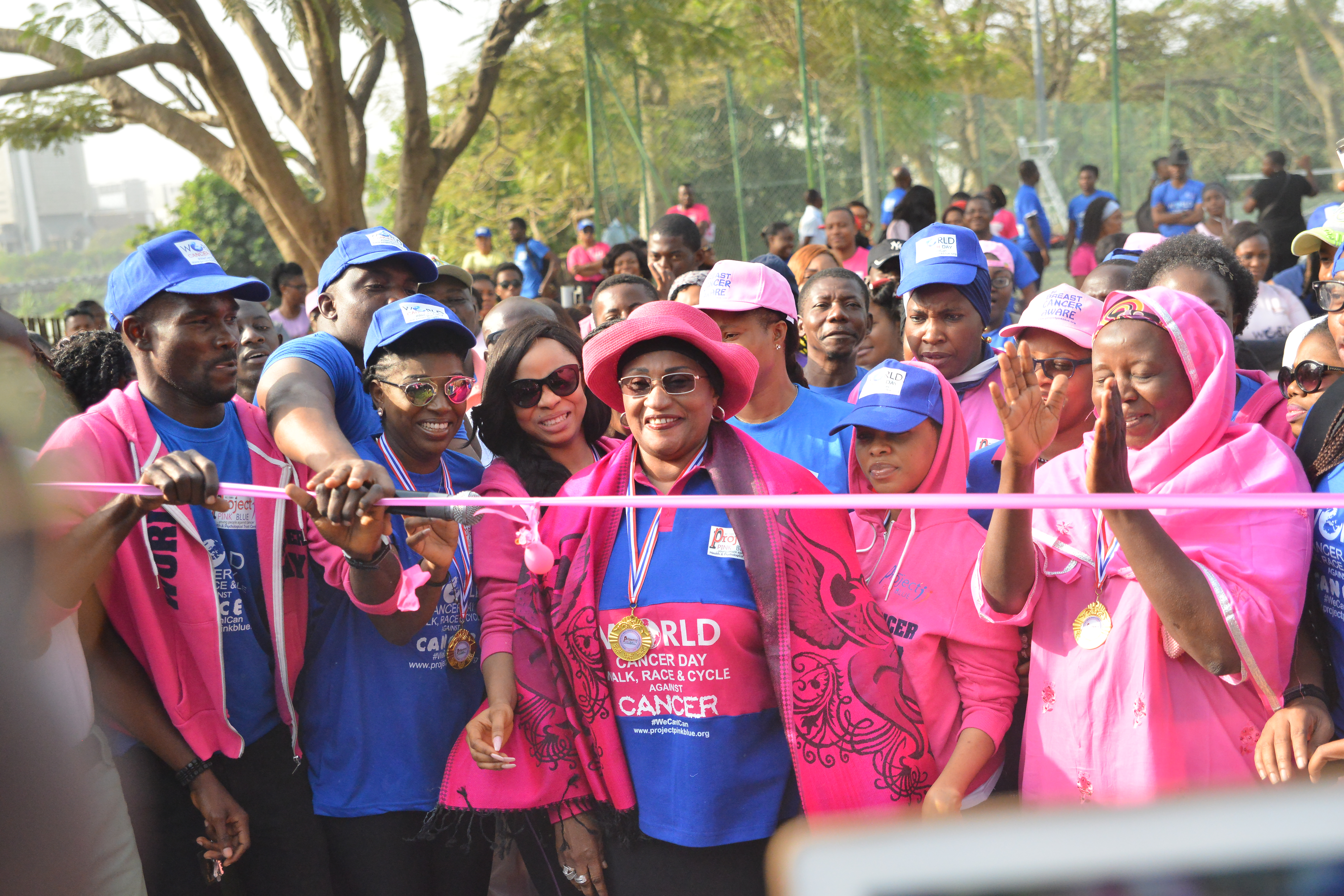
- Runcie C.W. Chidebe, Executive Director, Project PINK BLUE with Sen. Aisha J. Alhassan, Minister of Women Affairs & Social Dev.; Dr. Ramatu Hassan, Rep. Minister of Health, Chidinma Ekile, Toke Makinwa, Annie Idibia at World Cancer Day

Federal Minister of Women Affairs
- In office 11 November 2015 – 29 September 2018
- President: Muhammadu Buhari
- Preceded by: Zainab Maina
- Succeeded by: Aisha Abubakar

Senator for Taraba North
- In office 6 June 2011 – 6 June 2015
- Preceded by: Anthony George Manzo
- Succeeded by: Abubakar Sani Danladi

Personal details
- Born: 16 September 1959 Jalingo, Northern Region, British Nigeria (now in Taraba State, Nigeria)
- Died: 7 May 2021 (aged 61) Cairo, Cairo Governorate, Egypt
- Party: Peoples Democratic Party (1998–2014; 2019–2021); All Progressives Congress (2014–2018); United Democratic Party (2018–2019)
- Occupation: Politician; lawyer
- Nickname: Mama Taraba

Aisha Jummai Al-Hassan (16 September 1959 – 7 May 2021), popularly known as Mama Taraba, was a Nigerian lawyer and politician who served as the Federal Minister of Women Affairs from her appointment in 2015 until her resignation in 2018. She previously served as the senator representing the Taraba North senatorial district from 2011 to 2015.

Alhassan was elected senator in the 2011 Nigerian Senate elections under the platform of the Peoples Democratic Party (PDP). She later decamped to the main opposition party, All Progressive Congress (APC) and became the gubernatorial candidate of the party in Taraba State for the 2015 Taraba State gubernatorial election. She was defeated in the election re-run held on 25 April 2015 by the PDP candidate Darius Ishaku, but on 7 November 2015, tribunal sacked Ishaku and declared Alhassan winner of the 11 April 2015 poll. This was later reversed by the Appeal and Supreme Courts of Nigeria.

She was appointed minister by President Muhammadu Buhari in 2015 and sworn in on 11 November 2015 after being confirmed by the Senate. She resigned as the Minister of Women Affairs of Nigeria on 29 September 2018.

== Early life and career ==
Al-Hassan was born on 16 September 1959; she belonged to the Jibu tribe. A lawyer by training, she became the first female to be appointed Taraba State Attorney General and Commissioner of Justice; the first woman to be appointed Secretary, of the FCT judicial council and later appointed the Chief Registrar of the High Court of the Federal Capital Territory, Abuja on 17 December 2003. After she retired from service she went into business.

== Political career ==
=== Senate ===
In the January 2011 PDP primaries, Alhassan defeated the incumbent senator, former ambassador Manzo Anthony.

In the 9 April 2011 elections, she won 114,131 votes, defeating Jolly Nyame of the Action Congress of Nigeria (ACN) who polled 92,004 votes. She was one of four women elected on the PDP ticket, the others being Nkechi Nwaogu (Abia Central), Helen Esuene (Akwa Ibom South) and Nenadi Usman (Kaduna South). Following the election, she was said to have been in competition for the Senate President seat.

=== Gubernatorial candidacy ===
Alhassan contested for governor in the 2015 Taraba State gubernatorial election under the Platform of the All Progressive Congress (APC). She lost to the candidate of the Peoples Democratic Party (PDP), Darius Ishaku.

In November 2015, she was declared the winner of the April 2015 Taraba state gubernatorial election. This judgement was later reversed by an Appeal Court, who stated that the APC did not have "jurisdiction" over the primaries of the PDP.

In September 2018, she resigned from her federal appointment as minister and decamped to the United Democratic Party (UDP) after she was screened out by the ruling party APC from contesting the Taraba governorship seat in 2019. She was unanimously declared as the UDP candidate for the March 2019 Taraba State gubernatorial election after the other candidate stepped down in her favour. She later announced her defection back to the PDP after the governorship election, which was won again by Darius Ishaku of the Peoples Democratic Party, as the governor of Taraba State.

She is widely known as "Mama Taraba", because of her increased influence in the politics of her state.

== Personal life ==
Alhassan's elder brother is former two-term Senator from Taraba Central, Abdulazeez Ibrahim. She actively supported the Taraba State Football Association.

== Death ==
Alhassan died in a Cairo hospital in Egypt at the age of 61 from COVID-19 during the COVID-19 pandemic in Egypt.

President Muhammadu Buhari and former vice president Atiku Abubakar reacted to her death. In their reaction, President Muhammadu Buhari said he was saddened, while Atiku said he was grieved by the death of the former Minister of Women Affairs.
