= 1999 Nigerian Senate elections in Taraba State =

1999 Nigerian Senate election in Taraba State

The 1999 Nigerian Senate election in Taraba State was held on February 20, 1999, to elect members of the Nigerian Senate to represent Taraba State. Abdulazeez Ibrahim representing Taraba Central and Dalhatu Umaru Sangari representing Taraba South won on the platform of Peoples Democratic Party, while Abdulahi Bala Adamu representing Taraba North won on the platform of the All Nigeria Peoples Party.

== Overview ==
Affiliation	Party		Total
Affiliation	PDP	ANPP	Total
Before Election			3
After Election	2	1	3

== Summary ==
District	Incumbent	Party	Elected Senator	Party
Taraba Central			Abdulazeez Ibrahim	PDP
Taraba South			Dalhatu Umaru Sangari	PDP
Taraba North			Abdulahi Bala Adamu	ANPP

== Results ==
=== Taraba Central ===
The election was won by Abdulazeez Ibrahim of the Peoples Democratic Party.

1999 Nigerian Senate election in Taraba State
Party	Candidate	Votes	%
PDP	Abdulazeez Ibrahim		
Total votes			
PDP hold			

=== Taraba South ===
The election was won by Dalhatu Umaru Sangari of the Peoples Democratic Party.

1999 Nigerian Senate election in Taraba State
Party	Candidate	Votes	%
PDP	Dalhatu Umaru Sangari		
Total votes			
PDP hold			

=== Taraba North ===
The election was won by Abdulahi Bala Adamu of the All Nigeria Peoples Party.

1999 Nigerian Senate election in Taraba State
Party	Candidate	Votes	%
ANPP	Abdulahi Bala Adamu		
Total votes			
ANPP hold			
