= 2007 Nigerian Senate elections in Bayelsa State =

2007 Nigerian Senate election in Bayelsa State

The 2007 Nigerian Senate election in Bayelsa State was held on April 21, 2007, to elect members of the Nigerian Senate to represent Bayelsa State. Heineken Lokpobiri representing Bayelsa West, Emmanuel Paulker representing Bayelsa Central and Nimi Barigha-Amange representing Bayelsa East all won on the platform of the Peoples Democratic Party.

== Overview ==
| Affiliation | Party | | Total |
| Affiliation | PDP | AC | Total |
|---|---|---|---|
| Before Election | | | 3 |
| After Election | 3 | 0 | 3 |

== Summary ==
| District | Incumbent | Party | Elected Senator | Party |
|---|---|---|---|---|
| Bayelsa West | | | Heineken Lokpobiri | PDP |
| Bayelsa Central | | | Emmanuel Paulker | PDP |
| Bayelsa East | | | Nimi Barigha-Amange | PDP |

== Results ==
=== Bayelsa West ===
The election was won by Heineken Lokpobiri of the Peoples Democratic Party.

2007 Nigerian Senate election in Bayelsa State
| Party | Candidate | Votes | % |
|---|---|---|---|
| PDP | Heineken Lokpobiri | | |
| Total votes | | | |
| PDP hold | | | |

=== Bayelsa Central ===
The election was won by Emmanuel Paulker of the Peoples Democratic Party.

2007 Nigerian Senate election in Bayelsa State
| Party | Candidate | Votes | % |
|---|---|---|---|
| PDP | Emmanuel Paulker | | |
| Total votes | | | |
| PDP hold | | | |

=== Bayelsa East ===
The election was won by Nimi Barigha-Amange of the Peoples Democratic Party.

2007 Nigerian Senate election in Bayelsa State
| Party | Candidate | Votes | % |
|---|---|---|---|
| PDP | Nimi Barigha-Amange | | |
| Total votes | | | |
| PDP hold | | | |
