= Sani Danladi =

Nigerian politician (born 1968)

Senator for Taraba North
- In office 9 June 2015 – 23 June 2017
- Preceded by: Aisha Alhassan
- Succeeded by: Shuaibu Isa Lau

Acting Governor of Taraba State
- In office 22 November 2014 – 29 May 2015
- Governor: Danbaba Suntai
- Preceded by: Garba Umar (acting)
- Succeeded by: Darius Ishaku

Deputy Governor of Taraba State
- In office 22 November 2014 – 29 May 2015
- Governor: Danbaba Suntai
- Preceded by: Garba Umar
- Succeeded by: Haruna Manu
- In office 29 May 2007 – 4 October 2012
- Governor: Danbaba Suntai
- Preceded by: Armanyau Abubakar
- Succeeded by: Garba Umar

Personal details
- Born: Sani Abubakar Danladi; 14 February 1968 (age 58)
- Party: All Progressives Congress (since 2017)
- Other political affiliations: Peoples Democratic Party (1998–2017)
- Occupation: Politician

Sani Abubakar Danladi (born 14 February 1968) is a Nigerian politician who served as the senator representing the Taraba North Senatorial District from 2015 to 2017. He previously served as the acting governor of Taraba State from 2014 to 2015, and twice as deputy governor of Taraba State from 2007 to 2012, and from 2014 to 2015.

Danladi was elected deputy governor of Taraba State in the 2007 Taraba State gubernatorial election. He was re-elected in 2011. He was impeached as deputy governor on 4 October 2012. His impeachment was nullified by the supreme court on 21 November 2014, and he was reinstated as deputy governor and acting governor to serve out the term of Governor Danbaba Suntai who was incapacitated in an aircrash, three weeks after his impeachment.

He was elected senator representing the Taraba North senatorial district in the 2015 Nigerian Senate elections. He was sacked as senator by the supreme court on 23 June 2017.

On 7 August 2024, Danladi became a Board Member of the Tertiary Education Trust Fund.
