= Abubakar Umar Tutare =

Nigerian politician (born 1965)

Senator for Taraba Central
- In office 6 June 2011 – 6 June 2015
- Preceded by: Dahiru Bako Gassol
- Succeeded by: Bashir Marafa Abba

Personal details
- Born: 13 February 1965 (age 61) Gassol, Northern Region (now in Taraba State), Nigeria
- Party: Peoples Democratic Party
- Occupation: Politician

Abubakar Umar Tutare (born 13 February 1965) is a Nigerian politician who served as the senator representing the Taraba Central senatorial district from 2011 to 2015. He was elected in the 2011 Nigerian Senate elections, running on the platform of the Peoples Democratic Party (PDP).

== Early political career ==
Tutare was a representative in the Taraba State House of Assembly for two terms. He was appointed commissioner for the Finance, Commerce and Works ministries of the state, and finally Secretary to the State Government (SSG). He was a contender to be PDP candidate for the Taraba Central senate seat in the April 2007 elections, but lost out to Dahiru Bako, who went on to be elected. In June 2010 it was reported that Tutare was being questioned by the Economic and Financial Crimes Commission (EFCC) for alleged misappropriation of state government funds when he was commissioner of finance under governor Jolly Nyame. Later that month Tutare resigned from his position as SSG so he could compete in the senatorial election for Taraba Central.

== Senator ==
Tutare won the January 2011 PDP primaries to be the party's candidate in the April 2011 elections and was accepted as candidate by the Independent National Electoral Commission (INEC). However, the PDP leadership decided to substitute the incumbent senator, Dahiru Bako, as their candidate. When the PDP called for a re-run of the primary, Tutare filed a suit against the party. The re-run was boycotted by many of the delegates. Bako was declared the winner. On 12 March 2011 Governor Danbaba Suntai visited Mutum Biyu, the headquarters of Gassol local government area, and tried to give Bako his flag to formally start his campaign. This led to clashes between supporters of the two factions in which hundreds of people were injured. The mood leading up to the elections was ugly, with allegations that state security forces were removing the posters of opposition candidates and throwing supporters of the opposition into jail.

On 1 April 2011 a Federal High Court sitting in Yola declared that Tutare was the lawful candidate. The INEC declared Tutare the winner of the April elections with 126,165 votes, ahead of Abubakar Ahmed Rufi of the Congress for Progressive Change (CPC) with 25,900 and Mustapha JH. Gambo of the Action Congress of Nigeria, ACN with 11,816. Following his election, in May 2011 Tutare declared that the state was rich in agricultural, mineral and tourist resources. He promised to deliver good roads, clean water and quality education and health care. He noted that none of the towns or villages in his senatorial district was connected to the national electricity grid. In June 2011 Tutare was implicated in an EFCC case against former governor Jolly Nyame, in which Tutare allegedly assisted in a N1.3 billion fraud.
