= Executive Council of Taraba State =

Executive arm of a state government in Nigeria

The Taraba State Executive Council (also known as the Cabinet of Taraba State) is the highest formal governmental body that plays important roles in the Government of Taraba State headed by the Governor of Taraba State. It consists of the Deputy Governor, Secretary to the State Government, Chief of Staff, Commissioners who preside over ministerial departments, and (with the consent of the legislative arm of the government) the Governor's special aides.

== Functions ==
The Executive Council exists to advise and direct the Governor. Their appointment as members of the Executive Council gives them the authority to execute power over their fields.

== Executive Members ==
2019-2023
S/N	Name	Ministry
1.	Hon. Napthali Agbu kefas	Ministry of poverty & Alleviation
2.	Dr Jesse Adi	Ministry of Finance
3.	Danjuma Anyeze Adamu	Ministry of Information
4.	Badina Garba	Ministry of Power
5.	Edward Baraya	Ministry of Tatiary Education
6.	Innocent Vakkai	Ministry of Health
7.	Hon. Garba Ndaforo	
8.	Barr. Yusuf Akirikwen	Ministry of Water Resources
9.	Barr. SB Adda	Ministry of Justice
10.	Arc Aliyu Dankaro	Ministry of Housing
11.	Hon. Joseph Obadiah Asseh	Ministry of Culture and Tourism
12.	Hon. Alexander M. Menlo	Ministry of Rural Development
13.	Alh Alhassan Hamman	Ministry of Science and Technology
14.	Hon. Bridget Twar	Ministry of social development
15.	Hon. Johannes Jigem	Ministry of Basic and second Education
16.	Alh Yusuf Tanimu Njeke	Ministry of Commerce trade & industry
17.	Alh Lawan Ibrahim	Ministry of environment & sanitation
18.	Alh Adamu Ibrahim	Transport & Aviation
19.	Hon. Solomon Elisha	Ministry of Budget and planning
20.	Hon. Irmiya Hamman Julde	Ministry of Works
21.	Hon. Saleh Sa'ad	Ministry of Urban Development
22.	Hon. Ibrahim Adam Imam	Ministry of Youth and Sports
23.	Mrs Hauwa Kwena	Ministry of Women Affairs and Child Development
24.	Hon. Taninga Binga	Special Duties & Humanitarians Services

The current Executive Council is serving under the Dr. Agbu Kefas administration.

Office	Incumbent
Governor	Dr. Agbu Kefas
Deputy Governor	Alh. Aminu Abdullahi Alkali
Secretary to the State Government	Chief (Barr.) G.T Kataps
Head of Service	Hon. Suzy Jemima Nathans, MNI
Chief of Staff	Mr. Jeji Williams
Commissioner of Justice	Yakubu Maikasuwa (SAN)
Commissioner of Agric. & Food Security	Nicholas Oliver Namessan
Commissioner of Works	Irimiya Hamman-Julde
Commissioner of Energy & Economy Development	Engr. Naomi Tanko Agbu
Commissioner of Social Justice & Re-Integration	Dr. Philister Ibrahim Musa
Commissioner of Commerce, Trade & Industry	Mr. George Peter
Commissioner of Cooperatives and Poverty Alleviation	Mr. Habu James Philip
Commissioner of Heritage & Eco-Tourism	Hon. Joseph Titus Nagombe
Commissioner of Education	Dr. Augustina Godwin
Commissioner of Environment & Climate Change	Mrs. Aishat Adul-Azzez K. Barde
Commissioner of Digital Economy & Innovation	Mr. Gideon Samuel
Commissioner of Finance, Budget, & Economic Planning	Dr. Sarah Enoch Adi
Commissioner of Health	Dr. Bodia Gbansheya
Commissioner of Special Duties & Social Services	Hon. Saviour Badzoilig Noku
Commissioner of Information and Reorientation	Mrs. Zainabu Usman Jalingo
Commissioner of Rural & Urban Development	Comrade Julius Peter
Commissioner of Science and Technology	Mr. Usman Muslim Abdullahi
Commissioner of Social Welfare	Bridget Twar
Commissioner of Water Management & Aquatic Affairs	Mr. Daniel Ishaya
Commissioner of Women Affairs and Child Development	Mrs. Mary Sinjen
Commissioner of Transportation Development	Mr. Yakubu S. Yakubu
Commissioner of Youth & Sports Development	Mr. Joseph Joshua
