= Adebukola =

Adebukola is a given name. Notable people with the name include:

- Adebukola Banjoko, Nigerian judge
- Adebukola Oladipupo (born 1994), Nigerian actress
