= Anna Darius Ishaku =

Nigerian philanthropist

First Lady of Taraba State
- In office 29 May 2015 – 29 May 2023

Personal details
- Born: Anna Mbasughun; 24 August 1957 (age 68) Wusasa, Zaria, Kaduna State, Nigeria
- Spouse: Darius Dickson Ishaku
- Education: Girls High School, Gindiri; Ahmadu Bello University

Anna Dickson Ishaku (née Mbasughun; born 24 August 1957) is the founder and CEO of the NGO "Hope Afresh Foundation Taraba" and a member of the Nigerian Bar Association. She is married to Darius Dickson Ishaku, the former Governor of Taraba State.

== Early life and education ==
Mbasughun was born on 24 August 1957 in Wusasa, Zaria but hails from Vandeikya Local Government Area of Benue State. She attended the St. Bartholomew's Primary School, Wusasa, Zaria (1964-1969); where she further proceeded to Girls High School Gindiri (1969-1973). She was enrolled into the School of Basic Studies, Ahmadu Bello University from 1975 to 1976 and she graduated with Law Degree in 1979. She further attended Nigerian Law School, Lagos in 1979 and was called to the Nigerian Bar in 1980.

== Charity and philanthropy ==
Mbasughun founded the non-governmental organization "Hope Afresh Foundation Taraba" on 7 July 2016. Its vision is to become a global key player in providing humanitarian services.

On March 22, 2017, the foundation announced it partnership with the Central Bank of Nigeria to train unemployed youths. The CBN Entrepreneurship Development Training has been in existence for over two years in the North-East zone of Nigeria but failed to have Tarabans participating in the training until the intervention of Hope Afresh Foundation.

Another project is the Hope Health Center (HHC), a rehabilitation center which is committed to the improvements of lives to the citizens of Taraba, living with the effects of substance abuse and lessening the adverse impact on families and societies as a whole. She is also a strong advocate for Women in power, politics and peace.

== Personal life ==
Mbasughun is married to Darius Dickson Ishaku, who is a former Governor of Taraba State, they have five children.

== See also ==
- List of first ladies of Nigerian states
