= 2011 Nigerian Senate elections in Bayelsa State =

2011 Nigerian Senate election in Bayelsa State

The 2011 Nigerian Senate election in Bayelsa State was held on April 9, 2011, to elect members of the Nigerian Senate to represent Bayelsa State. Clever Ikisikpo representing Bayelsa East, Emmanuel Paulker representing Bayelsa Central and Heineken Lokpobiri representing Bayelsa West all won on the platform of Peoples Democratic Party.

== Overview ==
Affiliation	Party		Total
Affiliation	PDP	ACN	Total
Before Election			3
After Election	3	–	3

== Summary ==
District	Incumbent	Party	Elected Senator	Party
Bayelsa East			Clever Ikisikpo	PDP
Bayelsa Central			Emmanuel Paulker	PDP
Bayelsa West			Heineken Lokpobiri	PDP

== Results ==
=== Bayelsa East ===
Peoples Democratic Party candidate Clever Ikisikpo won the election, defeating other party candidates.

2011 Nigerian Senate election in Bayelsa State
Party	Candidate	Votes	%
PDP	Clever Ikisikpo		
Total votes			
PDP hold			

=== Bayelsa Central ===
Peoples Democratic Party candidate Emmanuel Paulker won the election, defeating other party candidates.

2011 Nigerian Senate election in Bayelsa State
Party	Candidate	Votes	%
PDP	Emmanuel Paulker		
Total votes			
PDP hold			

=== Bayelsa West ===
Peoples Democratic Party candidate Heineken Lokpobiri won the election, defeating party candidates.

2011 Nigerian Senate election in Bayelsa State
Party	Candidate	Votes	%
PDP	Heineken Lokpobiri		
Total votes			
PDP hold			
