= Johnson Oghuma =

Nigerian politician

Johnson Eguakhide Oghuma is a Nigerian politician. He was a member of the Nigerian House of representative representing Etsako Federal Constituency of Edo state. He was succeeded by Anamero Sunday Dekeri.

== Early life and education ==
Johnson Egwakhide Oghuma was born on 3 March 1960 in Fugar, Etsako Central Local Government Area of Edo State, Nigeria. He attended St. John's Grammar School, Fugar, for his secondary education. He later obtained a Bachelor of Science degree in Economics from Bendel State University (now Ambrose Alli University) in 1985 and earned a Master of Science degree in Economics from the University of Lagos in 1990. He is a Fellow of the Institute of Chartered Economists of Nigeria.

== Political career ==
Oghuma served as a member of the Edo State House of Assembly before he was elected to the House of Representatives in a 2017 by-election to represent the Etsako East/Etsako West/Etsako Central Federal Constituency. He was re-elected in the 2019 general election and represented the constituency in the 9th National Assembly. In 2023 general election, he was succeeded by Anamero Sunday Dekeri.

== Controversies ==
In 2020, Johnson Oghuma was charged by the ICPC for allegedly receiving a N1.6 million bribe from contractors of Feola Ventures Nigeria Ltd. The case was later withdrawn after Justice Adebukola Banjoko discharged and acquitted him of all charges.
