= Darius Ishaku =

Nigerian politician (born 1954)

Governor of Taraba State
- In office 29 May 2015 – 29 May 2023
- Deputy: Haruna Manu
- Preceded by: Danbaba Suntai (Note: Suntai became incapacitated in 2012 following an aircrash, the remainder of his term was served out by his deputies, Garba Umar and Sani Danladi)
- Succeeded by: Agbu Kefas

Personal details
- Born: Darius Dickson Ishaku; 30 July 1954 (age 72) Lupwe, Northern Region, British Nigeria (now in Taraba State, Nigeria)
- Party: Peoples Democratic Party
- Spouse: Anna Darius Ishaku
- Education: St. Paul's College Kufena, Zaria; Ahmadu Bello University
- Occupation: Politician; architect

Darius Dickson Ishaku (born 30 July 1954) is a Nigerian architect, urban planner, university lecturer and politician. He is a member of the Peoples Democratic Party and served as the governor of Taraba State from May 2015 to May 2023.

== Early life ==
Ishaku was born on 30 July 1954 to Mr Ishaku Istifanus and Mrs Naomi at Lupwe in Ussa Local Government Area of Taraba State. He is the fifth of ten children from his family, all of whom are members of the Christian Reformed Church of Nigeria.

The young Darius was enrolled into St Bartholomew's Primary School, Wusasa, Zaria, in 1961, and graduated in 1967.

He then proceeded to famous St. Paul's College Kufena, Zaria, for his secondary education, in 1972 and passed out in flying colours, obtaining West African Examination Certificate (WASC). He secured admission into the school of basic studies in prestigious Ahmadu Bello University, Zaria, in the same year (1972), for his advance Level education which was then a requirement for gaining admission into the university, and he passed out in 1974. He proceeded to the Ahmadu Bello University (ABU) where he studied and obtained a Bachelor's and a master's degree in Architecture, he went further to obtain an additional master's degree in Urban and regional planning.

Darius is a fellow of the Nigerian Institute of Architects (FNIA) and also a fellow of the Nigerian Institute of Town Planners (FNITP).

== Political career ==
Ishaku was previously the supervising minister for power, supervising minister for environment and the Minister of State for Niger Delta Affairs before he resigned to contest in the 2015 Taraba State gubernatorial election. He won the initial gubernatorial election against Aisha Jumai Alhassan of APC and David Sabo Kente of SDP, and was elected Governor of Taraba State after winning the subsequent re-run election. Darius won the 2015 election but was in a court battle with his opponent, senator Aisha Jumai Alhassan who took him to court and after a series of cases, Darius was declared the winner of the governorship election by the Supreme Court in early 2016.

Darius Ishaku was again successful, for his second run, in the gubernatorial election of March 2019, defeating his closest rival Alhaji Abubakar Sani Danladi of the All Progressives Congress by over 150,000 votes.

In the 2023 Senate election, a political newcomer David Jimkuta, polled 85,415 votes to defeat the incumbent governor Ishaku who scored 45,708 votes in the race for Taraba South Senatorial District.

== Award ==
In October 2022, a Nigerian national honour of Commander Of The Order Of The Niger (CON) was conferred on him by the then President Muhammadu Buhari.

== See also ==
- List of Nigerian architects
- List of governors of Taraba State
