= Jibu =

Jibu may refer to:

== Languages ==
- Jibu language, a Jukunoid language of Nigeria
- Jibu language (Papuan), a Papuan language of New Guinea

== People ==
- Jibu Jacob, Indian cinematographer and director
- Jibu Sani, Malawian sculptor

== Other uses ==
- Jibu Inc, African business and clean water company

== See also ==
- Jibu-ni, a Japanese stew
- Jibu-shō, 8th-century Japanese Ministry of Civil Administration
