= 2011 Nigerian Senate elections in Taraba State =

2011 Nigerian Senate election in Taraba State

The 2011 Nigerian Senate election in Taraba State was held on April 9, 2011, to elect members of the Nigerian Senate to represent Taraba State. Emmanuel Bwacha representing Taraba South, Abubakar Umar Tutare representing Taraba Central and Aisha Alhassan representing Taraba North all won on the platform of Peoples Democratic Party.

== Overview ==
Affiliation	Party		Total
Affiliation	PDP	ACN	Total
Before Election			3
After Election	3	–	3

== Summary ==
District	Incumbent	Party	Elected Senator	Party
Taraba South			Emmanuel Bwacha	PDP
Taraba Central			Abubakar Umar Tutare	PDP
Taraba North			Aisha Alhassan	PDP

== Results ==
=== Taraba South ===
Peoples Democratic Party candidate Emmanuel Bwacha won the election, defeating other party candidates.

2011 Nigerian Senate election in Taraba State
Party	Candidate	Votes	%
PDP	Emmanuel Bwacha		
Total votes			
PDP hold			

=== Taraba Central ===
Peoples Democratic Party candidate Abubakar Umar Tutare won the election, defeating other party candidates.

2011 Nigerian Senate election in Taraba State
Party	Candidate	Votes	%
PDP	Abubakar Umar Tutare		
Total votes			
PDP hold			

=== Taraba North ===
Peoples Democratic Party candidate Aisha Alhassan won the election, defeating party candidates.

2011 Nigerian Senate election in Taraba State
Party	Candidate	Votes	%
PDP	Aisha Alhassan		
Total votes			
PDP hold			
