= Anamero Sunday Dekeri =

Nigerian politician (born 1969)

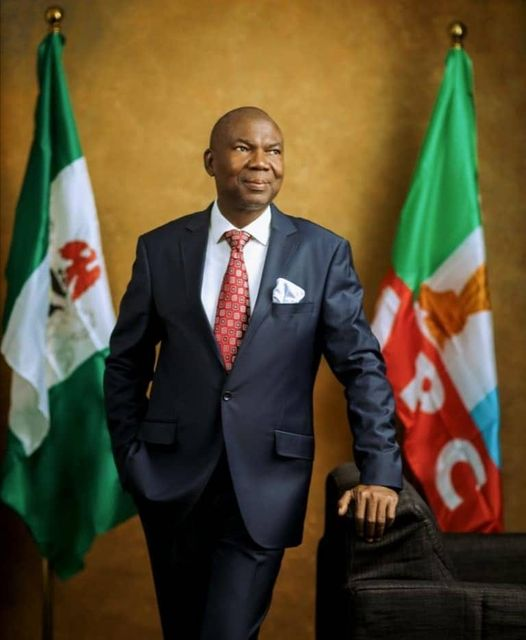
- Born: 25 October 1969 (age 56); Ogute-Oke, Okpella
- Education: Ambrose Alli University, Ekpoma
- Occupation: Member House of Representative Etsako Federal Constituency
- Predecessor: Johnson Oghuma
- Political party: All Progressives Congress
- Website: www.anamero.com

Anamero Sunday Dekeri is a Nigerian politician. He is a member of the Nigerian House of representative for Etsako Federal Constituency, Nigeria.

== Early life and education ==
Anamero Sunday Dekeri was born in the village of Ogute-Oke, Okpella, Edo State, Nigeria. His family worked as pastoral farmers. Dekeri obtained his First School Leaving Certificate from Ugbedudu Primary School and his Secondary School Certificate from Ogute-Oke Secondary School. He then went on to earn a Bachelor of Law degree from Ambrose Alli University, Ekpoma. He is also an Alumnus Nigeria Police College, Ikeja.

== Career ==
While pursuing his education, Dekeri sold palm produce to Eastern Nigerian merchants. This venture led him to travel to Ibadan to secure contracts with companies seeking palm products as raw materials. He established Danco International Group, a multinational company, and its subsidiary, Gulf Treasure Ltd.

Dekeri established the Anamero Idofe Anamero Foundation, a non-governmental organization dedicated to supporting the poor and needy. He has also made significant contributions to his local community, including building classrooms and staff offices for schools in Ogute-Oke and Itu Rogbe. Amongst other contributions is an ongoing Anamero School Support program that has run for 13 years. This Support program covers distribution of school materials as well as schorlaships to students. The foundation also runs a free summer school program for students. Dekeri recently expanded this program to cover 10,000 students across the Edo State. The Foundation distributed 500,000 books in Edo State and awarded bursary to some students at the University of Benin. The Anamero Foundation has provided Borehole Facilities, rural electrification, Road Construction and rehabilitation projects across his community. Other projects embarked upon by the Anamero Idofe Anamero Foundation includes the donation of wheel chairs to people with disability.

== Recognition and awards ==
- Gold Quality Award (Paris 2016)

== Politics ==
Dekeri entered the political arena in 2019 and was elected to represent the Etsako Federal Constituency in the House of Representatives under the All Progressives Congress (APC) party. He has sponsored a Bill for the Establishment of Federal Medical Center, Uluoke, Edo State, and a bill for the Establishment of Federal College of Technical Education, Okpella Edo state.

In 2023, Dekeri declared his candidacy for the governorship of Edo State, again under the APC banner. His campaign platform emphasizes education, health, agriculture and food security, infrastructural development and industrialization.
