= 1991 Taraba State gubernatorial election =

1991 gubernatorial election in Taraba State, Nigeria

Taraba gubernatorial election
- December 14, 1991
Nominee	Jolly Nyame
Party	SDP	NRC
Popular vote	484,090
Elected Governor
Jolly Nyame
SDP

The 1991 Taraba State gubernatorial election occurred on December 14, 1991. SDP candidate Jolly Nyame won the election, defeating NRC candidate.

== Conduct ==
The gubernatorial election was conducted using an open ballot system. Primaries for the two parties to select their flag bearers were conducted on October 19, 1991.

The election occurred on December 14, 1991. SDP candidate Jolly Nyame won the election, defeating NRC candidate. Jolly Nyame polled 484,090 votes.
