= 1999 Taraba State gubernatorial election =

1999 gubernatorial election in Taraba State, Nigeria

- January 9, 1999
Nominee	Jolly Nyame	Ahmed Jalingo
Party	PDP	APP
Popular vote	467,025	343,898
Governor before election
Bala Nuhu
Military
Elected Governor
Jolly Nyame
PDP

The 1999 Taraba State gubernatorial election occurred on January 9, 1999. PDP candidate Jolly Nyame won the election, defeating APP candidate.

== Results ==
Jolly Nyame from the PDP won the election. APP and AD candidates contested in the election.

The total number of registered voters in the state was 979,001, total votes cast was 839,379, valid votes was 816,117 and rejected votes was 23,262.

- Jolly Nyame, (PDP)- 467,025
- APP- 343,898
- AD- 5,194
