= Yohanna Dickson =

Nigerian military governor

Yohanna Mamman Dickson

Administrator of Taraba State
- In office 9 December 1993 – 22 August 1996
- Preceded by: Jolly Nyame
- Succeeded by: Amen Edore Oyakhire

Personal details
- Born: 28 December 1950 Kaningkon-Kafanchan, Kaduna State, Nigeria
- Died: 14 July 2015 (aged 64) Kaduna State, Nigeria

Colonel (rtd) Yohanna Mamman Dickson (28 December 1950 – 14 July 2015) was Administrator of Taraba State, Nigeria from December 1993 to August 1996 during the military regime of General Sani Abacha.

In April 2001, Dickson was named a member of the steering committee of the newly formed United Nigeria Development Forum (UNDF), a political group headed by several former military governors. In the April 2003 elections, Dickson was an unsuccessful candidate running on the United Nigeria People's Party (UNPP) platform for the Kaduna South senatorial seat.

Dickson challenged the result, saying the winner, Isaiah Balat of the People's Democratic Party (PDP), was not qualified to run for election.

Dickson later transferred to the PDP. In January 2009, he was appointed chairman of a seven-member disciplinary committee of the Kaduna State PDP chapter. He was appointed chairman of the Kaduna State Water Board. In August 2009, while inspecting a new water supply in the Zaria Regional Water Supply Scheme, Dickson said that the state would deal severely with contractors who failed to deliver on schedule and according to specifications.

Dickson died on 14 July 2015, aged 64, in Kaduna State, Nigeria.

== Bibliography ==
- Yohanna Mamman Dickson (2000). Soldiering, administering, and keeping the peace: reflections of an ex-military administrator. The Lord's Creations for PEFS, Programme on Ethnic and Federal Studies, Dept. of Political Science, University of Ibadan. ISBN 978-34203-0-5.
