= 2015 Taraba State gubernatorial election =

State election in Nigeria

- April 11, 2015
| Nominee | Darius Ishaku | Aisha Alhassan |
| Party | PDP | APC |
| Popular vote | 369,318 | 275,984 |
Governor before election
Danbaba Suntai
PDP
Elected Governor
Darius Ishaku
PDP

The 2015 Taraba State gubernatorial election was the 6th gubernatorial election of Taraba State. Held on April 11, 2015 and April 25, 2015 due to inconclusive, the People's Democratic Party nominee Darius Ishaku won the election, defeating Aisha Alhassan of the All Progressives Congress.

== PDP primary ==
PDP candidate, Darius Ishaku clinched the party ticket. The PDP primary election was held in 2014.

== APC primary ==
APC candidate, Aisha Alhassan clinched the party ticket. The APC primary election was held in 2014.

== Results ==
A total of 11 candidates contested in the election. Darius Ishaku from the People's Democratic Party won the election, defeating Aisha Alhassan from the All Progressives Congress. Registered voters was 1,461,645, accredited voters was 787,516, votes cast was 681,166, 174,131 votes was cancelled. The winner, Darius Ishaku won by 93,334 votes.

2015 Taraba State gubernatorial election
| Party | Candidate | Votes | % | ±% |
|---|---|---|---|---|
| PDP | Darius Ishaku | 369,318 | | |
| APC | Aisha Alhassan | 275,984 | | |
| PDP hold | | | | |
