= Nimi Barigha-Amange =

Nigerian politician

Member of the Senate of Nigeria
- In office 29 May 2007 – 29 May 2011
- Preceded by: Spiff Inatim Rufus
- Succeeded by: Clever Ikisikpo
- Constituency: Bayelsa East

Personal details
- Born: 10 May 1952 (age 72); Bayelsa State, Nigeria

Nimi Barigha-Amange (born 10 May 1952) is a former Senator for the Bayelsa East constituency of Bayelsa State, Nigeria. He took office on 29 May 2007 serving until 29 May 2011. He is a member of the People's Democratic Party (PDP).

Barigha-Amange earned an HND Petroleum Engineering (1981), LL.B (1993) and BL (1995). He became Head of the Lands and Claims department at ELF Petroleum Nigeria, Chairman of Board of the Niger Delta Basin Development Authority and Chairman of the Board of the Federal Medical Centre.

After taking his Senate seat in June 2007 Barigha-Amange was appointed to committees on Science & Technology, National Identity Card & Population, Interior Affairs and Capital Markets. In a mid-term evaluation of Senators in May 2009, ThisDay noted that he had sponsored bills on Technology Innovation Agency Establishment, Interception & monitoring of Communication and Civil Society Organisation. He had also sponsored and co-sponsored five motions. In an article in the Nigerian Tribune written in January 2010, Barigha-Amange called for full deregulation of the downstream petroleum industry and licensing of small and medium-sized refineries, which would help eliminate corruption and reduce domestic prices.

Reduction of unemployment by employing 55 people in his Farm Project. Rural and Community Development in areas of Scholarship, Free Mobile Boat Clinic, Micro Businesses, Extended Loans to Youths and Women cooperative societies.
