= 2003 Nigerian House of Representatives elections in Taraba State =

The 2003 Nigerian House of Representatives elections in Taraba State was held on April 12, 2003, to elect members of the House of Representatives to represent Taraba State, Nigeria.

== Overview ==
Affiliation	Party		Total
Affiliation	ANPP	PDP	Total
Before Election	-	5	6
After Election	-	6	6

== Summary ==
District	Incumbent	Party	Elected Reps Member	Party
Bali/Gassol	Dahiru Bako Gassol	PDP	Dahiru Bako Gassol	PDP
Jalingo/Yorro/Zing	Alhassan Al-Gaddas	PDP	Alhassan Al-Gaddas	PDP
Karim Lamido/Lau/Ardo-Kola	Tauru T. Hanin	PDP	Khamin Taurus	PDP
Sardauna/Gashaka/Kurmi	Kuriya Tafarki Auta	PDP	S.M. Nguroje	PDP
Takuma/Donga/Ussa	Abdulaziz Tanko	APP	Emmanuel Bwacha	PDP
Wukari/Ibi	Dantani Sunsuwa	PDP	Ikenya Joel Danlami	PDP

== Results ==
=== Bali/Gassol ===
PDP candidate Dahiru Bako Gassol won the election, defeating other party candidates.

2003 Nigerian House of Representatives election in Taraba State
Party	Candidate	Votes	%
PDP	Dahiru Bako Gassol		
PDP hold			

=== Jalingo/Yorro/Zing ===
PDP candidate Alhassan Al-Gaddas won the election, defeating other party candidates.

2003 Nigerian House of Representatives election in Taraba State
Party	Candidate	Votes	%
PDP	Alhassan Al-Gaddas		
PDP hold			

=== Karim Lamido/Lau/Ardo-Kola ===
PDP candidate Khamin Taurus won the election, defeating other party candidates.

2003 Nigerian House of Representatives election in Taraba State
Party	Candidate	Votes	%
PDP	Khamin Taurus		
PDP hold			

=== Sardauna/Gashaka/Kurmi ===
PDP candidate S.M. Nguroje won the election, defeating other party candidates.

2003 Nigerian House of Representatives election in Taraba State
Party	Candidate	Votes	%
PDP	S.M. Nguroje		
PDP hold			

=== Takuma/Donga/Ussa ===
PDP candidate Emmanuel Bwacha won the election, defeating other party candidates.

2003 Nigerian House of Representatives election in Taraba State
Party	Candidate	Votes	%
PDP	Emmanuel Bwacha		
PDP hold			

=== Wukari/Ibi ===
PDP candidate Ikenya Joel Danlami won the election, defeating other party candidates.

2003 Nigerian House of Representatives election in Taraba State
Party	Candidate	Votes	%
PDP	Ikenya Joel Danlami		
PDP hold			
