= Anthony George Manzo =

Nigerian politician

Senator for Taraba North
- In office May 2007 – May 2011
- Preceded by: Zik Sunday Ambuno
- Succeeded by: Aisha Jummai

Personal details
- Born: 1958 (age 67–68) Taraba State, Nigeria

Anthony George Manzo (born 1958) was elected Senator for the Taraba North Senatorial District of Taraba State, Nigeria, taking office on 29 May 2007. He is a member of the People's Democratic Party (PDP).

== Background ==
Manzo was born in 1958. He obtained certification as an MBBS and FRCS, becoming a Medical Practitioner. He was appointed Commissioner of Health, Taraba State and Chairman of the Medical Advisory Committee, Gwagwalada Specialist Hospital. During the second term of the Obasanjo presidency, he was Ambassador of Nigeria to Israel. From his experience in Israel, he concluded that the strength of democratic institutions was more important than that of individual officeholders. In January 2005, he was also appointed High Commissioner of Nigeria to Cyprus.

== Political career ==
After assuming his senate seat in 2007, Manzo was appointed to committees on Police Affairs, Information and Media, Health, Foreign Affairs and Air Force. In a mid-term evaluation of Senators in May 2009, ThisDay noted he had sponsored bills for amendment of the Nigeria Christian Pilgrims Commission Act, Nation Security Enhancement, amendment of the Psychiatric Hospital Management Board Act, University of Abuja College of Medicine, Mental Health, and Free Medical Centres.

In October 2008, Manzo was the sponsor of a motion titled "Global Credit Crisis and its Impact on Nigeria", which was cosponsored by nineteen other senators. The motion criticized the recent bank consolidations under CBN governor Chukwuma Soludo, recommended improvements to bank regulation and supervision, and called on the Federal Government to pay debts owed to local contractors and pensioners in order to reduce the credit crunch, among other things. In an article published in ThisDay in November 2008, Manzo made the case that projects to develop Nigeria were of no value unless the people of the country could return to basic principles of honesty and integrity. Without these, the country could never become great. In August 2009, Manzo defended cross-carpeting, saying it would be undemocratic to prohibit politicians from changing parties.

Manzo was a contender to again be the PDP candidate for Taraba North in the April 2011 elections, but was defeated in the primaries by Aisha Jummai, who went on to be elected to the Senate.
