= Abdulahi Bala Adamu =

Nigerian politician

Senator for Taraba North
- In office May 1999 – May 2003
- Succeeded by: Zik Sunday Ambuno

Personal details
- Born: Taraba State, Nigeria

Abdulahi Bala Adamu was elected Senator for the Taraba North constituency of Taraba State, Nigeria at the start of the Nigerian Fourth Republic, running on the People's Democratic Party (PDP) platform. He took office on 29 May 1999.

Adamu was Secretary to the Taraba State Government between 1994 and 1997. He was a founding member of the All People's Party (APP) in Taraba State, but moved to the PDP on which ticket he successfully contested the 1999 election for the Taraba North Senate seat. After taking his seat in the Senate in June 1999, he was appointed to committees on Rules & Procedures, Security & Intelligence, Judiciary, Science & Technology (vice chairman), Water Resources and Information (vice chairman).

By August 2002 Adamu had begun to campaign to be elected Governor of Taraba State. However, the incumbent governor Jolly Nyame won by a landslide. In May 2009 the FCT Minister, Senator Muhammad Adamu Aliero, swore in Adamu as mandate secretary for Social Development in the Federal Capital Territory.
