= 2003 Taraba State gubernatorial election =

2003 gubernatorial election in Taraba State, Nigeria

- April 19, 2003
Nominee	Jolly Nyame	Abubakar Saad
Party	PDP	ANPP
Running mate	Uba Maigari Ahmadu	Daniel Musa Goyo
Popular vote	784,013	102,879
Governor before election
Jolly Nyame
PDP
Elected Governor
Jolly Nyame
PDP

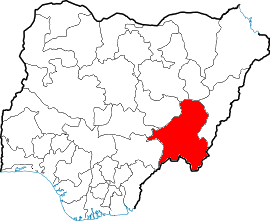
Map showing location of Taraba State in Nigeria

The 2003 Taraba State gubernatorial election occurred on April 19, 2003. PDP candidate Jolly Nyame won the election, defeating ANPP Abubakar Saad and other 6 candidates.

== Results ==
Jolly Nyame from the PDP won the election. 8 candidates contested in the election.

The total number of registered voters in the state was 1,026,950.

- Jolly Nyame, (PDP)- 784,013
- Abubakar Saad, ANPP- 102,879
