= 2003 Nigerian House of Representatives elections in Bayelsa State =

The 2003 Nigerian House of Representatives elections in Bayelsa State was held on April 12, 2003, to elect members of the House of Representatives to represent Bayelsa State, Nigeria.

== Overview ==
Affiliation	Party		Total
Affiliation	APGA	PDP	Total
Before Election	-	4	5
After Election	1	2	5

== Summary ==
District	Incumbent	Party	Elected Reps Member	Party
Brass/Nembe	Dieworio W. Wuku	PDP	Kalango Youpele	PDP
Ogbia	Edeni Mary E.	PDP	Clever Ikisikpo	PDP
Sagbama/Ekeremor	Clement Amlie	AD		
Southern Ijaw	Foter Okoto	PDP	Ere E. Fereinsikumo	APGA
Yenagoa/Kolokuna/Opokuma	Mike Epengale	PDP		

== Results ==
=== Brass/Nembe ===
PDP candidate Kalango Youpele won the election, defeating other party candidates.

2003 Nigerian House of Representatives election in Bayelsa State
Party	Candidate	Votes	%
PDP	Kalango Youpele		
PDP hold			

=== Ogbia ===
PDP candidate Clever Ikisikpo won the election, defeating other party candidates.

2003 Nigerian House of Representatives election in Bayelsa State
Party	Candidate	Votes	%
PDP	Clever Ikisikpo		
PDP hold			

=== Sagbama/Ekeremor ===
Party candidate won the election, defeating other party candidates.

2003 Nigerian House of Representatives election in Bayelsa State
Party	Candidate	Votes	%
	hold		

=== Southern Ijaw ===
APGA candidate Ere E. Fereinsikumo won the election, defeating other party candidates.

2003 Nigerian House of Representatives election in Bayelsa State
Party	Candidate	Votes	%
APGA	Ere E. Fereinsikumo		
APGA hold			

=== Yenagoa/Kolokuna/Opokuma ===
Party candidate won the election, defeating other party candidates.

2003 Nigerian House of Representatives election in Bayelsa State
Party	Candidate	Votes	%
	hold		
