= Ekperikpe Ekpo =

Nigerian politician (born 1964)

The Honourable Ekperikpe Ekpo

Minister of State for Petroleum Resources (Gas)
- Incumbent
- Assumed office August 21, 2023 Serving with Heineken Lokpobiri
- President: Bola Tinubu
- Preceded by: Timipre Sylva

Member of the House of Representatives of Nigeria for Abak/Etim Ekpo/Ika
- In office 2007–2011

Personal details
- Born: November 20, 1964 (age 61) Ika, Eastern Region, Nigeria (now Akwa Ibom State, Nigeria)
- Party: All Progressives Congress
- Education: University of Calabar
- Occupation: Politician

Ekperikpe Ekpo is a Nigerian politician who serves as the Minister of State for Petroleum Resources (Gas). He was a member of the House of Representatives representing Abak/Etim Ekpo/Ika federal constituency in the National Assembly from 2007 to 2011 and the chairman of the Governing Council of the Nigerian Content Development and Monitoring Board (NCDMB) since 2024.

== Early life and education ==
Ekperikpe Ekpo was born on 20 November 1966 in Ika, Akwa Ibom, Nigeria. He attended St. Dominic Primary School and St. Augustine Secondary School in Akwa Ibom State. He later earned a degree in Biology (Ecology) from the University of Calabar and returned to the university in 2015 to complete a Master’s degree in Environmental Pollution and Toxicology.

== Early career ==
Ekpo began his career as a teacher during his National Youth Service Corps (NYSC) year, serving as Head of Science Department at Ise/Emure Grammar School in Ekiti State. He continued teaching for eleven years at Queen of Apostles Seminary, Afaha Obong, before transitioning into public service in 2002.

== Political career ==
=== Local government service ===
In 2003, Ekpo was appointed as the Caretaker Chairman of Ika Local Government Council, where he facilitated the completion of a Federal Government electrification project connecting Ika to the national grid. He was elected as Head of the Council in 2004, serving until 2005.

=== Member of the House of Representatives ===
Ekpo was elected to represent the Abak/Etim Ekpo/Ika federal constituency in the Nigerian House of Representatives in 2007. During his tenure, he played an active role in legislative processes, particularly in the areas of infrastructure development and public welfare.

He served on several committees, including the House Committee on Industry (as Deputy Chairman), and the Committees on Customs Service, National Security and Intelligence, Power, and Niger Delta Affairs. He sponsored significant legislation, including a bill to mandate the display of manufacturing and expiry dates on tyres and prohibit the importation of used tyres. His motions addressed public safety concerns such as airfield light failures and the redeployment of NYSC members to safer areas.

=== Minister of State for Petroleum Resources (Gas) ===
In August 2023, Ekpo was appointed as Nigeria's Minister of State for Petroleum Resources (Gas). In this role, he outlined a mission to harness natural gas for sustainable energy use, focusing on the Nigerian Gas Expansion Program (NGEP). His efforts include attracting investment for gas infrastructure, reducing gas flaring, and stabilizing domestic LPG prices.

== Contributions and achievements ==
Ekpo has overseen significant developments in the gas industry:

- Facilitated the resolution of the Gas Sales Purchase Agreement for the Brass Methanol Project, unlocking $3 billion in investment.
- Supervised the commissioning of key gas projects including the Kwale Gas Gathering Hub and LPG transportation infrastructure.
- Ensured a firm commitment to achieve net zero flare gas emissions which has seen the NNPCL/TotalEnergies Joint Venture achieve zero routine gas flare in all its Nigerian assets.

== Personal life ==
Ekperikpe Ekpo is a practicing Catholic and is married to Lady Esitmbom Ekperikpe Ekpo. They have five children. He has been recognized with several awards for his public service, including the traditional title of Obongemem 1 from the Traditional Rulers Council of Ika.
