= Federal Ministry of Petroleum Resources =

Government department in Nigeria

- Type: Federal Ministry
- Industry: Oil and gas
- Founded: 1975; 51 years ago
- Headquarters: Block D, NNPC Towers, Herbert Macaulay Way, CBD, Abuja, FCT, Nigeria
- Key people: Bola Tinubu (Minister of Petroleum Resources); Heineken Lokpobiri (Minister of State (Oil)); Ekperikpe Ekpo (Minister of State (Gas))
- Products: Crude Oil, Gas, petroleum products, petrochemicals,
- Website: petroleumresources.gov.ng

The Federal Ministry of Petroleum Resources is a part of the Federal Ministries of Nigeria that directs petroleum resources and its activities in Nigeria.

== History ==
In the beginning, Petroleum matters were handled by the Hydrocarbon Section of the Ministry of Lagos Affairs, which reported directly to the Governor-general.

The Unit delivered responsibilities such as: keeping records on exploration matters, and importation of petroleum products; enforcing safety and other regulations on matters which were then mostly products importation and distribution, etc.

The Unit was upgraded to a Petroleum Division within the Ministry of Mines and Power, with the expansion of the petroleum industry activities. In 1971, the Nigerian National Oil Corporation (NNOC) was created to handle direct commercial operational activities in the oil industry on behalf of the Federal Government. However, the Department of Petroleum Resources in the Federal Ministry of Mines and Power continued to exercise statutory supervision and control of the industry. In 1975, the department was upgraded to a ministry named, the Ministry of Petroleum and Energy which was later renamed the Ministry of Petroleum Resources. Then in 1985, the Ministry of Petroleum Resources was re-established.

== Organizational structure ==
The ministry has one permanent secretary, nine directors, two deputy directors and an assistant director heading their various departments. The Minister is a political appointee, while the Permanent Secretary who is a veteran civil servant and the Chief Accounting Officer of the Ministry. The Permanent Secretary reports all the affairs of the Ministry to the Minister, while the Directors in the Ministry report to the Permanent Secretary. The Ministry has twelve Directorates, each headed by a Director, namely:

- Department of Human Resources Management
- Department of Planning
- Department of Research and Statistics
- Department of Press and public relations
- Department of Finance and Accounts
- Legal Department
- Department of Procurement
- Department of Gas
- Department of Oil Services
- Department of reforms Co-ord
- Department of General Services
- Department of Internal Audit
- Department of Special Duties

Each Department has various divisions and sections. Deputy Directors head divisions, and Assistant Directors head sub-sections/units. Directors report directly to the Permanent Secretary, Deputy Directors report to the Directors, and Assistant Directors report to the Deputy Directors.

Each of the Departments has various divisions and sections in a hierarchical/pyramid setting headed by deputy directors, and the assistant directors heading sub-sections/units. The Directors report directly to the Permanent Secretary, while the deputy directors report to the Directors and the assistant directors report to the deputy directors respectively. The Ministry of Petroleum Resources operational frame work operates in a hierarchical level from the top management cadre down to the middle/junior executive cadre.

== Leadership ==
President Bola Tinubu is the Minister of Petroleum Resources. He appointed Heineken Lokpobiri as the Minister of State for Petroleum Resources (Oil) and Ekperikpe Ekpo as Minister of State for Petroleum Resources (Gas) in August 2023. They replaced Timipre Sylva who took over the Ministerial portfolio in August 2019. Amb. Nicholas Agbo Ella, Esq, is the current Permanent Secretary, Ministry of Petroleum Resources.

== Mission ==
Ensure an enabling environment to improve the Oil and Gas value chain, driven by modern technology, industry, best practices, stakeholders' engagement and innovations in alternative energy.

== Functions ==
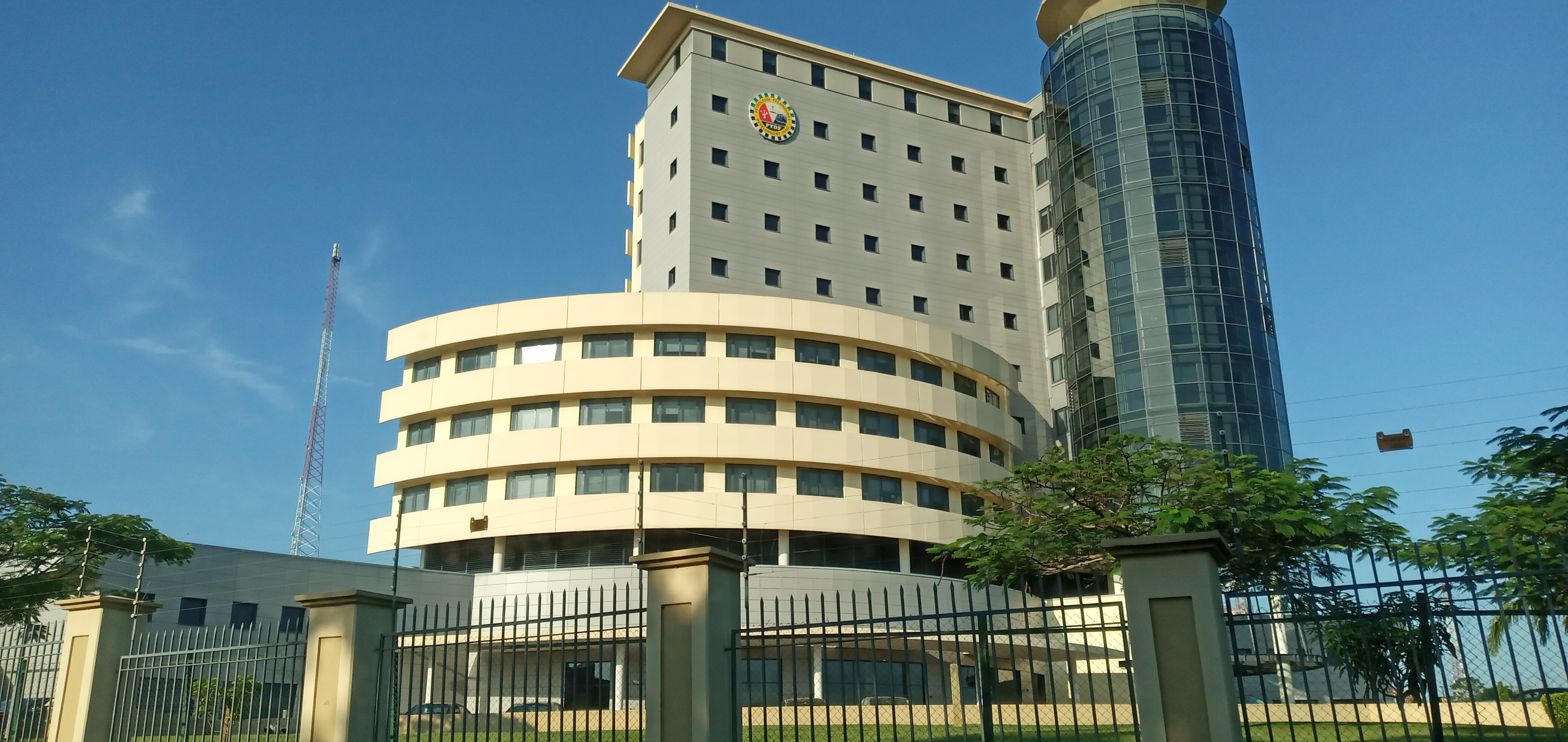
Headquarters of the PTDF in Abuja

- Initiation and formulation of the board policies and programmes on the development of the Petroleum sector (Oil and Gas) in general;
- All policies matters on the marketing of crude oil, natural gas, Petroleum products and their derivatives;
- All concession policies in the oil and gas sub-sectors of the energy sector of the economy;
- Formulation of policies to stimulate private industry investment and participation in the oil and gas sectors;
- Administration of government joint venture interests in the Petroleum sector in order to maximize fully economic benefits derivable from Nigeria's oil and gas resources and ensuring optimization of government interest in all oil and gas arrangements;
- Licensing of all Petroleum and gas operations and activities;
- Policy matters relating to research and development in Petroleum and Gas sectors of the Petroleum industry;
- Development of hydro-carbon industries including natural gas, processing, refineries and Petrochemical industries through public private partnership;
- Formulation of policies to ensure increase of natural oil and gas reserve base and Nigeria's increased technical productivity in accordance with appropriate planning and allocation of production quotas to producing companies in line with OPEC quota and maximization of revenue from oil and gas to the Nation;
- Coordination and supervision of all bilateral and multilateral relations affecting the energy (Oil and Gas) Sector; Overall supervision and coordination of the activities of the following parastatals and its subsidiaries.

== Parastatals ==
- Nigerian Upstream Petroleum Regulatory Commission (NUPRC)
- Nigerian Mid- and Downstream Petroleum Regulatory Authority (NMDPRA)
- Petroleum Training Institute (PTI)
- Nigeria Nuclear Regulatory Authority (NNRA)
- Nigerian Content Development Monitoring Board (NCDMB)
- Petroleum Technology Development Fund (PTDF)
