= Jibu Inc =

African business and clean water company

Jibu is a company based in East Africa. It is a social enterprise working towards the democratization of clean water access and providing business opportunities in the impoverished African region.

== History ==
Jibu was co-founded in 2012 by Colorado-based entrepreneurs Randy and Galen Welsch. Jibu in Swahili means to answer, solve, or respond. Jibu’s social franchise model allows local entrepreneurs to purify and sell safe drinking water in their own communities. The company opened its first official water kiosk in Kampala, Uganda in 2013. Kampala also serves as Jibu’s African regional headquarters. By 2015, Jibu was operating in Uganda, Rwanda, and DR Congo, and it has continued growing across the region.

Jibu has established over 180 franchise units and distributing millions of liters of affordable drinking water. The company emphasizes the importance of sustainable, locally-driven solutions over external interventions.

=== Founders ===
Jibu was co-founded in 2012 by Galen Welsch and his father, Randy Welsch, with the mission to address the urban water crisis in Africa through a sustainable, franchise-based model. Their approach focuses on empowering local entrepreneurs to own and operate water purification and distribution franchises, thereby promoting both access to safe drinking water and economic development. After helping to establish Jibu's foundational operations, Randy transitioned to a role on the company's board, supporting its strategic direction.

== Business model ==
Jibu's business model is low profit with a social mission, called a Low-profit limited liability company (L3C). The company installs a water filtration system near the distributors (1–2 km radius). They use two kinds of water purification techniques: reverse osmosis to get rid of physical contaminants such as bacteria, viruses, and dirt, and ultra filtration to remove salts and minerals. The one-time fee to buy a 20-liter water bottle is $9-$12, depending on the country. The customers bring back the empty bottles to get refilled for $1. The new bottle is sanitized, capped, and sealed. Jibu treats, packages, and distribute affordable clean water to the local franchises.

== Awards and recognitions ==
Jibu, Inc. has garnered several awards and recognitions for its franchising model and community work:

- Financial Times and IFC Transformational Business Award (2020): Jibu was honored with the Transformational Business Award for Innovations in Urban Infrastructure by the Financial Times and the International Finance Corporation.
- Financial Times Top 100 Africa's Fastest-Growing Companies (2023): Jibu was listed among the Top 100 Africa's Fastest Growing Companies by the Financial Times and Statista.
- Kenya Beverage Excellence Awards (2022): Jibu Kenya received accolades in two categories: 1st runner-up for Most Preferred Bottle Designed for Water for its 20L tap bottle, and 2nd runner-up for Most Preferred Purified Drinking Water.
