= Adeyemi Afolahan =

Nigerian politician

Rear Admiral Adeyemi Ambrose Afolahan

Administrator of Taraba State
- In office 28 August 1991 – 2 January 1992
- Preceded by: Abubakar Salihu (Gongola State)
- Succeeded by: Jolly Nyame

Personal details
- Born: 26 December 1949 (age 76) Ibadan, Oyo State, Nigeria

Military service
- Branch/service: Nigerian Navy
- Rank: Rear Admiral

Adeyemi Ambrose Afolahan (born 26 December 1949) was appointed the first Administrator of Taraba State, Nigeria in August 1991 after the state was created from part of the old Gongola State during the military regime of General Ibrahim Babangida. He handed over to the elected civilian governor Jolly Nyame in January 1992 at the start of the Third Nigerian Republic.

Afolahan was born on 26 December 1949 in Ibadan, Oyo State. He studied in Nigeria and the United Kingdom. Posts included deputy commandant, National War College, Abuja, Chief of Naval Operations and Chief of Naval Plans.

Speaking at a seminar in Lagos in May 2000, Afolahan called on Nigerian youths to abstain from sex or at least use condoms to ensure an AIDS-free society.

He was a former ambassador to the Republic of Guinea Bissau.

He became Chairman of the Ila Orangun Unity Movement.
