= 2007 Taraba State gubernatorial election =

State election in Nigeria

- 14 April 2007
| Nominee | Danbaba Suntai | Ahmed Yusuf |
| Party | PDP | ACN |
| Popular vote | 515,016 | 119,720 |
Governor before election
Jolly Nyame
PDP
Elected Governor
Danbaba Suntai
PDP

The 2007 Taraba State gubernatorial election was the 4th gubernatorial election of Taraba State. Held on 14 April 2007, the People's Democratic Party nominee Danbaba Suntai won the election, defeating Ahmed Yusuf of the Action Congress of Nigeria.

== Results ==
Danbaba Suntai from the People's Democratic Party won the election, defeating Ahmed Yusuf from the Action Congress of Nigeria. Registered voters was 1,173,514.

2007 Taraba State gubernatorial election
| Party | Candidate | Votes | % | ±% |
|---|---|---|---|---|
| PDP | Danbaba Suntai | 515,016 | 0 | |
| ACN | Ahmed Yusuf | 119,720 | 0 | |
| PDP hold | | | | |
