= Joseph Titus Nagombe =

Nigerian politician (born 1981)

Honourable Commissioner of Heritage and Ecotourism, Taraba State
- Incumbent
- Assumed office 18 July 2023

Personal details
- Born: 25 January 1981 (age 45)
- Party: All Progressive Congress
- Education: Reformed Theological Seminary, Mkar Gboko *Modibbo Adama Federal University of Technology, Yola
- Occupation: Politician; Reverend

Joseph Titus Nagombe (born 25 January 1981) is a Nigerian politician and a member of the Peoples Democratic Party. He is the Commissioner of Heritage and Ecotourism., Taraba State and the first Coordinator of NGADA special Development Area.
