= 2003 Nigerian House of Representatives elections in Nasarawa State =

The 2003 Nigerian House of Representatives elections in Nasarawa State was held on April 12, 2003, to elect members of the House of Representatives to represent Nasarawa State, Nigeria.

== Overview ==
| Affiliation | Party | | Total |
| Affiliation | ANPP | PDP | Total |
|---|---|---|---|
| Before Election | - | 5 | 5 |
| After Election | - | 5 | 5 |

== Summary ==
| District | Incumbent | Party | Elected Reps Member | Party |
|---|---|---|---|---|
| Nasarawa/Toto | Samuel Egya | PDP | Samuel Egya | PDP |
| Lafia/Obi | Yusuf Suleiman | PDP | Mohammed Al-Makura | PDP |
| Keffi/Karu/Kokona | Salisu M. Raji | PDP | Ahmed D. Aliyu | PDP |
| Awe/Doma/Keana | Musa Elayo | PDP | Abdullahi S. Hashimu | PDP |
| Akwanga/Nasarawa/Eggon/Wamba | Idris Yahaya Yakubu | PDP | Patricia Akwashiki | PDP |

== Results ==
=== Nasarawa/Toto ===
PDP candidate Samuel Egya won the election, defeating other party candidates.

2003 Nigerian House of Representatives election in Nasarawa State
| Party | Candidate | Votes | % |
|---|---|---|---|
| PDP | Samuel Egya | | |
| PDP hold | | | |

=== Lafia/Obi ===
PDP candidate Mohammed Al-Makura won the election, defeating other party candidates.

2003 Nigerian House of Representatives election in Nasarawa State
| Party | Candidate | Votes | % |
|---|---|---|---|
| PDP | Mohammed Al-Makura | | |
| PDP hold | | | |

=== Keffi/Karu/Kokona ===
PDP candidate Ahmed D. Aliyu won the election, defeating other party candidates.

2003 Nigerian House of Representatives election in Nasarawa State
| Party | Candidate | Votes | % |
|---|---|---|---|
| PDP | Ahmed D. Aliyu | | |
| PDP hold | | | |

=== Awe/Doma/Keana ===
PDP candidate Abdullahi S. Hashimu won the election, defeating other party candidates.

2003 Nigerian House of Representatives election in Nasarawa State
| Party | Candidate | Votes | % |
|---|---|---|---|
| PDP | Abdullahi S. Hashimu | | |
| PDP hold | | | |

=== Akwanga/Nasarawa/Eggon/Wamba ===
PDP candidate Patricia Akwashiki won the election, defeating other party candidates.

2003 Nigerian House of Representatives election in Nasarawa State
| Party | Candidate | Votes | % |
|---|---|---|---|
| PDP | Patricia Akwashiki | | |
| PDP hold | | | |
