= Aina Owoniyi =

Aina Joseph Owoniyi

Administrator of Taraba State
- In office August 1998 – 29 May 1999
- Preceded by: Amen Edore Oyakhire
- Succeeded by: Jolly Nyame

Aina Joseph Owoniyi was administrator of Taraba State, Nigeria from August 1998 to May 1999 during the transitional regime of General Abdulsalami Abubakar.

Owoniyi's administration was notable for lack of corruption.

He approved salary increases for Taraba State Civil Servants.

In November 1998, Owoniyi suspended indefinitely the Commissioner of Agriculture, Daniel Nyaa Bobzom and his education counterpart Joseph Rishante for insubordination, negligence of duty and sabotage.

After handing over to the civilian governor Jolly Nyame in May 1999, as a former military administrator he was required to retire from the army.
