= Dahiru Bako Gassol =

Nigerian politician

Senator for Taraba Central
- In office 29 May 2007 – May 2011
- Preceded by: Abubakar Ibrahim
- Succeeded by: Abubakar Umar Tutare

Personal details
- Born: 4 May 1954 (age 70); Gassol, Taraba State, Nigeria

Dahiru Bako Gassol (born 4 May 1954) was elected Senator for the Taraba Central Senatorial District of Taraba State, Nigeria, taking office on 29 May 2007. He is a member of the People's Democratic Party (PDP).

Gassol obtained a post graduate diploma in management. He was appointed a Director, Primary Healthcare of the Bali Local Government in Taraba State. He was elected to the House of Representatives in 1999, and reelected in 2007. After taking his seat in the Senate, he was appointed to committees on Water Resources, Senate Services, Culture & Tourism and Capital Markets. In a midterm evaluation of Senators in May 2009, ThisDay said that he had not sponsored any bills, and was hardly visible on the floor or in committee.

Gassol was appointed chairman of the Taraba State Legislators Forum. In a January 2010 interview, he stated that the legislators had an excellent relationship with Governor Danbaba Suntai.
