= Garba Umar =

Nigerian politician

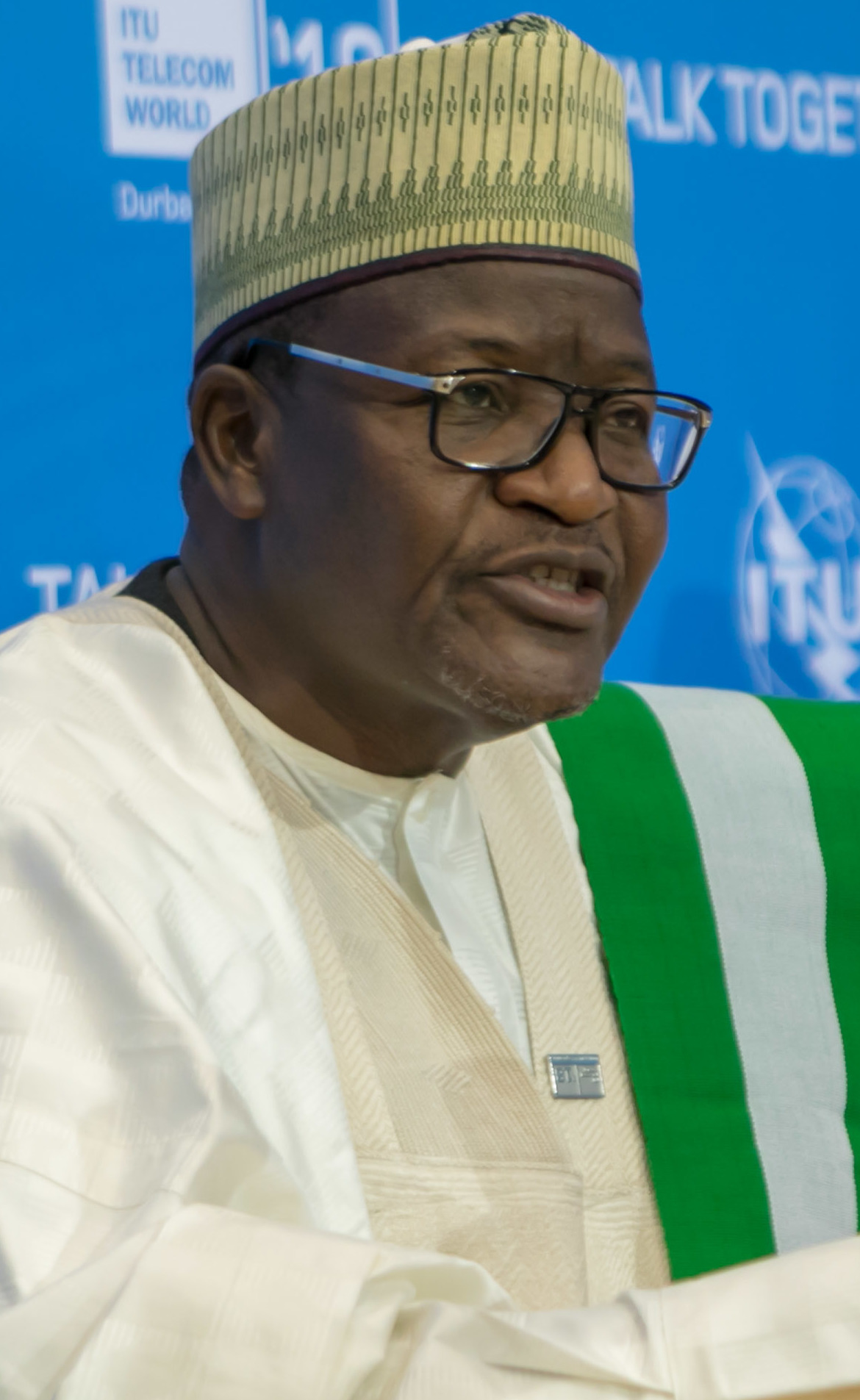

Acting Governor of Taraba State
- In office 14 November 2012 – 21 November 2014
- Governor: Danbaba Suntai
- Preceded by: Danbaba Suntai
- Succeeded by: Sani Danladi (acting)

Deputy Governor of Taraba State
- In office 5 October 2012 – 21 November 2014
- Governor: Danbaba Suntai
- Preceded by: Sani Danladi
- Succeeded by: Sani Danladi

Personal details
- Party: Peoples Democratic Party
- Occupation: Politician

Garba Umar is a Nigerian politician who served as the acting governor of Taraba State from 2012 to 2014 following the incapacitation of Governor Danbaba Suntai due to an aircrash. He also served as the deputy governor of Taraba State from his appointment in October 2012 till his removal from office by the supreme court in November 2014 on the account of the illegal impeachment of his predecessor Sani Danladi.

Umar was appointed deputy governor of Taraba State following the impeachment of Sani Danladi by the Taraba State House of Assembly on 4 October 2012. He became acting governor a month after his appointment when the Cessna 208 aircraft Governor Danbaba Suntai was piloting crashed on his way to Yola, Adamawa State. He was removed from office by the supreme court on 21 November 2014, when his predecessor was reinstated.
