= Agbu Kefas =

Nigerian politician (born 1970)

His Excellency Agbu Kefas

Governor of Taraba State
- Incumbent
- Assumed office 29 May 2023
- Deputy: Aminu Abdullahi Alkali
- Preceded by: Darius Dickson Ishaku

Personal details
- Born: 12 November 1970 (age 55) Wukari, North-Eastern State (now in Taraba State), Nigeria
- Party: Peoples Democratic Party
- Education: Nigerian Defence Academy; University of Ibadan; Delta State University, Abraka
- Occupation: Politician; military officer

Agbu Kefas (born 12 November 1970) is a Nigerian politician and retired Nigerian army lieutenant colonel who has served as the governor of Taraba State since 2023.

== Early life, Education and Christian Life ==
Agbu Kefas was born on 12 November 1970, in Wukari, Taraba State (formally Gongola State), Nigeria. He is a younger brother of the late Air Commodore Ibrahim Kefas. He was educated at the Nigerian Defence Academy in Kaduna where he obtained a Bachelor of Science degree in political science and defense studies in 1994, the University of Ibadan in Oyo State where he earned a master's degree in legal criminology & security psychology in 2005, and the Delta State University, Abraka where he obtained a master's degree in public administration in 2008. He attended Harvard Kennedy School where he earned a certificate in Executive Education Senior Executive in National and International Security. He is also a member of the Deeper Life Bible Church. He has been a member of the church from a very young age.

== Political career ==
Agbu's wife Agyin

Agbu Kefas retired from the Nigerian army after 21 years of service. Upon his retirement, he was appointed chairman Governing board of directors Nigerian Maritime Administration and Safety Agency (NIMASA) between 2013 and 2015. He was also a member of the Presidential Committee on North-East Initiative from 2016 to 2019 before he fully joined politics by emerging the State Chairman of the Peoples Democratic Party, Taraba State in 2020. In 2022, Agbu Kefas contested in the Taraba State PDP gubernatorial primary election and won. Kefas ran for office of the Governor of Taraba State in March 2023 as a member of the Peoples Democratic Party, the state's ruling party. He won the election, defeating second-place Muhammad Yahaya of the New Nigeria People's Party by just 100,337 votes. On 31 January 2026 Agbu Kefas defected to the ruling party, All Progressive Congress.

== Personal life ==
Agbu is married to Agyin Kefas and they have four children.
