= Spiff Inatim Rufus =

Nigerian politician

Federal Representative
- Constituency: Bayelsa East senatorial district

Personal details
- Died: December 24, 2022
- Occupation: Politician

Spiff Inatim Rufus was a Nigerian politician who represented Bayelsa East senatorial district at the 5th National Assembly between 2003 and 2007. He died on December 24, 2022 at the age of 68.
