= 2003 Nigerian House of Representatives elections in Kwara State =

The 2003 Nigerian House of Representatives elections in Kwara State was held on April 12, 2003, to elect members of the House of Representatives to represent Kwara State, Nigeria.

== Overview ==
Affiliation	Party		Total
Affiliation	ANPP	PDP	Total
Before Election	-	2	6
After Election	2	4	6

== Summary ==
District	Incumbent	Party	Elected Reps Member	Party
Asa/Ilorin West	Gbemisola Ruqayyah Saraki	APP	Ogundairo S. Ajibade	PDP
Baruten/Kaiama	Idris S. Abubakar	PDP	Maimunat Adaji	ANPP
Edu/Moro/Patigi	Yunusa Y. Ahmed	PDP	Yunusa Y. Ahmed	PDP
Ekiti/Isin/Irepodun/Oke-ero	Basair Bola Oni	APP	Makanjuola G.P	PDP
Ilorin East/South	Farouk A. O. Farouk	APP	Z.O. Edun	PDP
Offa/Oyun/Ifelodun	Rauf Kolawole Shitu	APP	O.A. Adebola Oyedele	ANPP

== Results ==
=== Asa/Ilorin West ===
PDP candidate Ogundairo S. Ajibade won the election, defeating other party candidates.

2003 Nigerian House of Representatives election in Kwara State
Party	Candidate	Votes	%
PDP	Ogundairo S. Ajibade		
PDP hold			

=== Baruten/Kaiama ===
ANPP candidate Maimunat Adaji won the election, defeating other party candidates.

2003 Nigerian House of Representatives election in Kwara State
Party	Candidate	Votes	%
ANPP	Hajia Maimunat Adaji		
ANPP hold			

=== Edu/Moro/Patigi ===
PDP candidate Yunusa Y. Ahmed won the election, defeating other party candidates.

2003 Nigerian House of Representatives election in Kwara State
Party	Candidate	Votes	%
PDP	Yunusa Y. Ahmed		
PDP hold			

=== Ekiti/Isin/Irepodun/Oke-ero ===
PDP candidate Makanjuola G.P won the election, defeating other party candidates.

2003 Nigerian House of Representatives election in Kwara State
Party	Candidate	Votes	%
PDP	Makanjuola G.P		
PDP hold			

=== Ilorin East/South ===
PDP candidate Z.O. Edun won the election, defeating other party candidates.

2003 Nigerian House of Representatives election in Kwara State
Party	Candidate	Votes	%
PDP	Z.O. Edun		
PDP hold			

=== Offa/Oyun/Ifelodun ===
ANPP candidate O.A. Adebola Oyedele won the election, defeating other party candidates.

2003 Nigerian House of Representatives election in Kwara State
Party	Candidate	Votes	%
ANPP	O.A. Adebola Oyedele		
ANPP hold			
