= Clever Ikisikpo =

Nigerian politician

Clever Marcus Ikisikpo

Member of the Senate of Nigeria
- In office May 2011 – May 2015
- Preceded by: Nimi Barigha-Amange
- Succeeded by: Ben Murray-Bruce
- Constituency: Bayelsa East

Personal details
- Party: People's Democratic Party (PDP)
- Education: University of Port Harcourt

Clever Marcus Ikisikpo is a Nigerian politician who served as a member of the Senate of Nigeria from May 2011 to 2015. He ran on the People's Democratic Party (PDP) platform representing Bayelsa East constituency, in Bayelsa State, Nigeria.

Ikisikpo gained a bachelor's degree in education from the University of Port Harcourt. He was elected as a member of the Bayelsa House of Assembly, holding office from 1999 to 2003. Before his election to the Senate, Ikisikpo was twice the Federal Representative for the Ogbia Constituency, elected in 2003 and again in 2007. In the House, he was a member of committees on Appropriations, Army, Emergency & Disaster Management, Petroleum Resources (DownStream), Petroleum Resources (UpStream) and Works.

In February 2010 it was reported that, as committee chairman on Petroleum (Downstream), Ikisikpo was engaged in a struggle with Sanusi Barkindo, group managing director of the Nigeria National Petroleum Corporation (NNPC). In October 2010 Ikisikpo said there would no longer be any fuel shortages in the country since the House, in partnership with President Goodluck Jonathan, had permanently broken the cartel that formerly controlled distribution.
