= Amen Edore Oyakhire =

Nigerian politician (born 1945)

Military Administrator of Taraba State
- In office 22 August 1996 – August 1998
- Preceded by: Yohanna Dickson
- Succeeded by: Aina Owoniyi

Military Administrator of Oyo State
- In office 16 August 1998 – 28 May 1999
- Preceded by: Ahmed Usman
- Succeeded by: Lam Adesina

Personal details
- Born: 21 October 1945 (age 80)

Prince Amen Edore Oyakhire (born 21 October 1945) was the Military Administrator of Taraba State, Nigeria between August 1996 and August 1998 during the military regime of General Sani Abacha. He was then administrator of Oyo State during the transitional regime of General Abdulsalami Abubakar, handing over to the elected civilian governor Lam Adesina in May 1999 at the start of the Nigerian Fourth Republic.

== Police career ==
Oyakhire was a commissioner of police, later an Assistant Inspector General (AIG).

He was the Police Commissioner, Plateau State Command before being appointed administrator of Taraba State.

In Taraba State, Oyakhire had to deal with hostilities between the Kuteb and Chamba and Jukun ethnic groups. In October 1997 he sent a paper called Comprehensive brief on the Chieftaincy Stool of Takum Chiefdom Taraba State to the Armed Forces Ruling Council. That month seven people were killed and seven houses razed in communal violence, and 31 people were arrested. Oyakhire said anyone suspected of involvement in the communal violence would be treated as detractors of the transition to civil rule.

In 1998 the Taraba State Government also set up a Peace Committee which managed to negotiate a temporary peace between the ethnic groups.

Shortly before the handover to civilian government in May 1999, Oyakhire told a U.S. Embassy observer team that "Power is to be handed over to credible people who have the fear of God in their hearts, and this will ensure the stability of the nation".

== Later career ==
Oyakhire was made to retire in June 1999 along with all other governors in the previous military regime. In August 1999 the Oyo State government asked the army to help recover property allegedly stolen by Oyakhire and his aides, including vehicles and electronic gadgets. The request was refused.

In December 1999 Oyakhire's house in Lagos was raided by armed robbers who stole property worth several million naira. An article on witchcraft published in The Daily Independent reported that 27 people were killed in Ozalla, Edo State on 4 November 2004. The article said the Ozalla massacre was triggered by a letter from Oyakhire blaming witches in the community for his inability to afford a suitable home in the town, for non-payment of his police pension and for insanity among his children.
