= 2003 Nigerian House of Representatives elections in the Federal Capital Territory =

Federal Capital Territory elections, Nigeria

The 2003 Nigerian House of Representatives elections in Federal Capital Territory was held on April 12, 2003, to elect members of the House of Representatives to represent Federal Capital Territory, Nigeria.

== Overview ==
Affiliation	Party		Total
Affiliation	ANPP	PDP	Total
Before Election	-	2	2
After Election	1	1	2

== Summary ==
District	Incumbent	Party	Elected Senator	Party
Abaji/Gwagwalada/Kwali/Kuje	Yusuf Baban Takwa	PDP	Yusuf Baban Takwa	PDP
Amac/Bwari	Prince Nicholas Ukachukwu	PDP	Philips Tanimu Aduda	ANPP

== Results ==
=== Abaji/Gwagwalada/Kwali/Kuje ===
Party candidates registered with the Independent National Electoral Commission to contest in the election. PDP candidate Yusuf Baban Takwa won the election.

2003 Nigerian House of Representatives election in Federal Capital Territory
Party	Candidate	Votes	%
PDP	Yusuf Baban Takwa		
Total votes			
PDP hold			

=== Amac/Bwari ===
Party candidates registered with the Independent National Electoral Commission to contest in the election. ANPP candidate Philips Tanimu Aduda won the election.

2003 Nigerian House of Representatives election in Federal Capital Territory
Party	Candidate	Votes	%
ANPP	Philips Tanimu Aduda		
Total votes			
ANPP hold			
