= 2011 Taraba State gubernatorial election =

State election in Nigeria

- April 26, 2011
Nominee	Danbaba Suntai	Ahmed Yusuf
Party	PDP	CPC
Popular vote	361,176	176,342
Governor before election
Danbaba Suntai
PDP
Elected Governor
Danbaba Suntai
PDP

The 2011 Taraba State gubernatorial election was the 5th gubernatorial election of Taraba State. Held on April 26, 2011, the People's Democratic Party nominee Danbaba Suntai won the election, defeating Ahmed Yusuf of the Congress for Progressive Change.

== Results ==
A total of 11 candidates contested in the election. Danbaba Suntai from the People's Democratic Party won the election, defeating Ahmed Yusuf from the Congress for Progressive Change. Valid votes was 716,769.

2011 Taraba State gubernatorial election
Party	Candidate	Votes	%	±%
PDP	Danbaba Suntai	361,176		
CPC	Ahmed Yusuf	176,342		
PDP hold				
