= Dalhatu Umaru Sangari =

Nigerian politician

Senator of the Federal Republic of Nigeria from Taraba State South District
- In office May 1999 – May 2003
- Succeeded by: Saleh U. Damboyi

Personal details
- Born: Taraba State, Nigeria
- Party: All People's Party (APP)

Dr. Dalhatu Umaru Sangari was elected Senator for the Taraba South constituency of Taraba State, Nigeria at the start of the Nigerian Fourth Republic, running on the All People's Party (APP) platform. He took office on 29 May 1999.

Sangari gained a doctoral degree in Land Resources Development from the University of Ibadan. He was a lecturer in geography and researcher at Bayero University, Kano for 16 years before entering politics. He became Deputy Dean of the University's Post Graduate School (1996–1998). He was elected as a senator during the Sani Abacha transition regime, but did not take his seat before Abacha's death.

After taking his seat in the Senate in June 1999 Sangari was appointed to committees on Environment, Labor, Water Resources (vice chairman), Education, Information and Government Affairs. He was appointed a member of the panel led by Senator Idris Ibrahim Kuta that probed possible financial irregularities in contract awards between June 1999 and July 2000, which indicted several Senators.
