= Zik Sunday Ambuno =

Nigerian politician

Senator
- Constituency: Northern Taraba Senatorial District

Personal details
- Party: Peoples Democratic Party (Nigeria)
- Occupation: Politician

Zik Sunday Ambuno is a Nigerian politician. He was a senator who represented the Northern Taraba Senatorial District in the 5th National Assembly.
