= Heineken Lokpobiri =

Nigerian politician (born 1967)

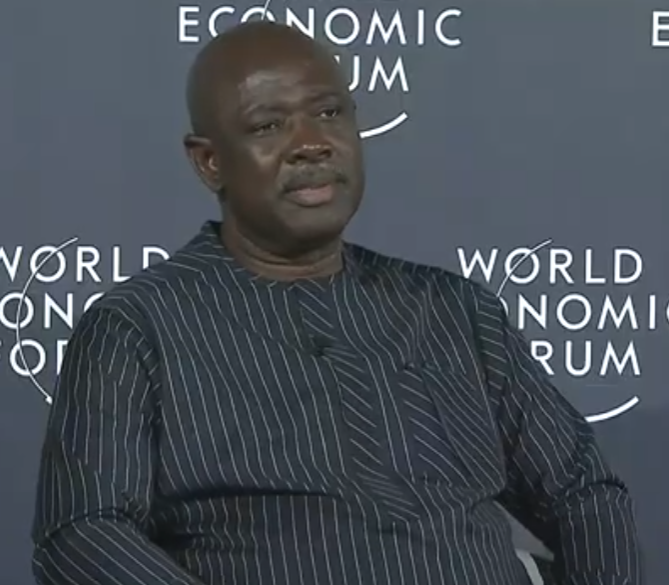
- At a WEF special meeting in 2024

Minister of State for Petroleum Resources (Oil)
- Incumbent
- Assumed office 21 August 2023 Serving with Ekperikpe Ekpo (Gas)
- President: Bola Tinubu
- Minister: Bola Tinubu
- Preceded by: Timipre Sylva

Minister of State for Agriculture and Rural Development
- In office 11 November 2015 – 28 May 2019
- President: Muhammadu Buhari
- Minister: Audu Ogbeh
- Preceded by: Bukar Tijani
- Succeeded by: Mustapha Baba Shehuri

Senator for Bayelsa West
- In office 5 June 2007 – 6 June 2015
- Preceded by: John Kojo Brambaifa
- Succeeded by: Foster Ogola

Speaker of the Bayelsa State House of Assembly
- In office 2 June 1999 – May 2001

Member of the Bayelsa State House of Assembly
- In office 2 June 1999 – 2 June 2003

Personal details
- Born: 3 March 1967 (age 59)
- Party: All Progressives Congress (2015–present)
- Other political affiliations: Peoples Democratic Party (1998–2015)
- Children: 4
- Education: Rivers State University (LL.B); Leeds Beckett University
- Profession: Politician; lawyer

Heineken Lokpobiri (born 3 March 1967) is a Nigerian politician who is the minister of state for Petroleum Resources (Oil). He previously served as minister of state for Agriculture and Rural Development from 2015 to 2019, and as Senator representing Bayelsa West Senatorial District from 2007 to 2015. He is a former speaker of the Bayelsa State House of Assembly.

== Early life and education ==
Heineken Lokpobiri received an LL.B (Hons) in 1994 from Rivers State University of Science and Technology, Port Harcourt, BL February 1995.

Expert in Environmental Rights and Environmental Law, holds a Doctorate degree Ph.D. from Leeds Beckett University, UK in 2015.

== Political career ==
Lokpobiri was a member of the Bayelsa State House of Assembly from 1999 to 2003, and speaker of the house from June 1999 – May 2001.

=== First senate term ===
He was elected to the Nigerian Senate for the Bayelsa West constituency in 2007 and was appointed to committees on Sports, Public Accounts, Police Affairs, Niger Delta and Millennium Development Goals.

After Nigeria performed poorly at the 2008 Africa Cup of Nations in Ghana, the Senate Sports Committee of which Lokpobiri was chairman issued a report which cast blame on maladministration and lack of cooperation from the Director General of the National Sports Commission, Dr. Amos Adamu. Lokpobiri was chairman of the Senate Ad-hoc Committee on Transport. In June 2009, after further sabotage of oil facilities by militants in the Niger Delta, he praised the Federal Government's amnesty, saying "With the current amnesty deal, I believe that both parties will go home satisfactory and the contractors will henceforth work in more stable environment and that will accelerate the pace of road construction in the region."

In July 2009, the Senate passed the National Agency for Elderly Persons bill, sponsored by Lokpobiri, which will give legal support, welfare and recreational facilities to elderly people in the country. In September 2009, the authorities of the Federal Capital Development Authority (FCDA) and the Federal Executive Council (FEC) announced approval of new land charges in Abuja, the Federal Capital Territory. Senator Lokpobiri initiated a stormy debate when he accused the authorities of acting illegally by failing to first secure the approval of the National Council of States.

=== Second senate term ===
Lokpobiri ran for reelection as Bayelsa West Senator in the April 2011 elections, on the PDP platform, and was initially declared the winner.

However, the Independent National Electoral Commission(INEC) then withdrew their decision, declaring that the election was fraught with "widespread irregularities". A few minutes after the announcement, Lokpobiri was arrested by State Security Service operatives.

Lokpobiri challenged the INEC decision. The INEC had planned to rerun the election in Sagbama and Ekeremor local governments on 28 April 2011, but a high court in Yenagoa issued an order restraining the INEC from conducting the election until the challenge had been resolved. Lokpobiri took his seat in the Senate on 29 May 2011 and was appointed chairman of the committee on Water Resources and a member of the committee on Solid Minerals.

In August 2011, it was reported that the police were not prosecuting Lokpobiri and others suspected of electoral offenses since the INEC had to approve any such move. The INEC said that it did not have the powers to prosecute offenders.

In March 2012, Lokpobiri introduced controversial legislation that would make it harder for labor unions to call a strike. A ballot would be required before industrial action could be started. Lokpobiri said, "This helps to achieve an affirmative consensus on union members through the instrumentality of ballot. Fairness, transparency and accountability are also given pride of place in the scheme of things."

Other senators disagreed. Senator Joshua Dariye said, "The most democratic institution in the world is organized labour, they are the only hope of the society, if we stampede them, I fear we will be calling for anarchy."

In 2015, he decamped from the ruling Peoples Democratic Party, PDP, to the All Progressives Congress, APC. He was later appointed by the Buhari led APC as a minister of State for Agriculture and Rural Development".

== Personal life ==
Lokpobiri is married and has four children.
