= Abdulazeez Ibrahim =

Nigerian politician (1957–2021)

Abdulazeez Abubakar Ibrahim

Senator for Taraba Central
- In office May 1999 – May 2007
- Succeeded by: Dahiru Bako Gassol

Personal details
- Born: 27 November 1957 Taraba State, Nigeria
- Died: 5 October 2021 (aged 63)

Abdulazeez Abubakar Ibrahim (27 November 1957 – 5 October 2021) was elected senator for the Taraba Central constituency of Taraba State, Nigeria at the start of the Nigerian Fourth Republic, running on the People's Democratic Party (PDP) platform. He took office on 29 May 1999. He was reelected in April 2003.

== Background ==
Ibrahim was born in 1957. He obtained degrees in Engineering and Business Administration from Ahmadu Bello University, Zaria.

== Political career ==
After taking his seat in the Senate in June 1999 he was appointed to committees on Commerce (vice chairman), Industry, Aviation, Science & Technology, Power & Steel, National Planning and Special Projects. In April 2005 he was among other senators interrogated by the Independent Corrupt Practices and Other Related Offences Commission (ICPC) concerning a scandal in which Education Minister Fabian Osuji was said to have paid out N55 million in bribes so they would inflate the ministry's budget. In the April 2007 elections he was a candidate for governor of Taraba State running on the All Nigeria People's Party (ANPP) platform. Danbaba Suntai of the PDP was the winner.
