= Adebukola Banjoko =

Nigerian judge

Justice Judge

The Chairman, Code of Conduct Tribunal of Nigeria

Personal details
- Education: University of London
- Occupation: Barrister, Jurist, Judge

Adebukola Bankole was sworn in as Honorable Justice of the Court of Appeal on 28 June 2021 by The Chief Justice of Nigeria (CJN), Justice Ibrahim Tanko Muhammad. She was a Nigerian Judge of the High Court of Federal Capital Territory in Abuja that sentenced two Ex-Governors in Nigeria to imprisonment - Joshua Dariye to a 14 years in prisonment after being found guilty of some criminal charges and Jolly Nyame to 28 years imprisonment without an option of fine both on similar charges in a trail that lasted over a decade. President Muhammadu Buhari appointed Justice Adebukola Banjoko as Chairman of Code of Conduct Tribunal (CCT), in June 2018 as Adamu Abdu-Kafarati was appointed as the Chief Judge of the Federal High Court in a letter he wrote to the Senate requesting the confirmation of Mr Abdu-Kafarati's appointment.

== Early life ==
Banjoko hails from Ogun State and hold a Bachelor in Law from the University of London, where she was between 1982 and 1985. She was at the Nigerian Law School between 1985 and 1986. She practised law for a while before her appointment as a Magistrate in Oyo State where she served between May 1997 and November 2003. She left in 2003 as Chief Magistrate, Administration and in December 2003, she became a judge of the High Court of the FCT. She became Justice of the Appellate Court in 2021.

== Career ==
Adebukola Banjoko excused herself from the trial of former chairman, House of Representatives Ad hoc Committee on Fuel Subsidy Regime, Farouk Lawan and one other in 2014 as she ordered the case file be returned to the court's Chief Judge, Justice Ibrahim Bukar. She refused to continue with proceedings in the case despite the withdrawal of an application filed by Lawan, asking her to disqualify herself from the case after the Chief Judge had cleared her of the allegation in a petition as she tags the contents of the petition to be "scandalous and a challenge" on her integrity.

As of 2014, she has spent six years as a magistrate and 11 years as a judge. She was the Chairman of the Code of Conduct Tribunal in Nigeria. She is currently Justice of the appellate Court.
