= Danbaba Suntai =

Nigerian politician (1961–2017)

Governor of Taraba State
- In office 29 May 2007 – 29 May 2015 (Note: Suntai became incapacitated on 25 October 2012 following an aircrash. Garba Umar became acting governor; 14 November 2012 – 21 November 2014 and Sani Danladi; 22 November 2014 – 29 May 2015)
- Deputy: Sani Danladi (2007–2012; 2014–2015); Garba Umar (2012–2014)
- Preceded by: Jolly Nyame
- Succeeded by: Darius Ishaku

Personal details
- Born: Danbaba Danfulani Suntai; 30 June 1961 Suntai, Bali, Northern Region (now in Taraba State), Nigeria
- Died: 28 June 2017 (aged 55) Houston, Texas, U.S.
- Party: Peoples Democratic Party (2002–2017)
- Other political affiliations: All Nigeria Peoples Party (1998–2002)
- Spouse: Hauwa Suntai
- Children: Zainab; Mariam
- Occupation: Politician; pharmacist

Danbaba Danfulani Suntai (30 June 1961 – 28 June 2017) was a Nigerian pharmacist and politician who served as the governor of Taraba State from 2007 to 2015. He was involved in a self piloted aircrash on 25 October 2012, which left him incapacitated for the remainder of his term.

== Background ==
Danbaba Danfulani Suntai was born on 30 June 1961 at Suntai Town in Bali Local Government Area of Taraba State. He attended Federal Government College, Kano (1975–1980) and the School of Basic Studies at Ahmadu Bello University, Zaria (1980–1981). He was admitted to Ahmadu Bello University where he read Pharmacy and graduated in 1984. He did his internship at Yola Specialist Hospital and his National Youth Service at the State Hospital, Ijaiye, Abeokuta, Ogun State (1985–1986). He then worked at the General Hospital, Ganye in old Gongola State until 1991.

== Early political career ==
Danbaba Suntai was elected Chairman of Bali Local Government (1989–1993). Joining the Taraba State civil service, he was Director-General of the Taraba State Ministry of Agriculture and National Resources (1994–1996). In the 1999 elections, he was State chairman of the All People's Party (APP), when the PDP narrowly defeated the All Nigeria People's Party (ANPP). In 2000, he became Chairman of Taraba State Investment and Properties Ltd. He was appointed Commissioner of the Ministry of Education (2000–2003), and worked at the Ministry of Health (2003–2005) before becoming Secretary to the Taraba State Government (2005–2007).

== Governor of Taraba State ==
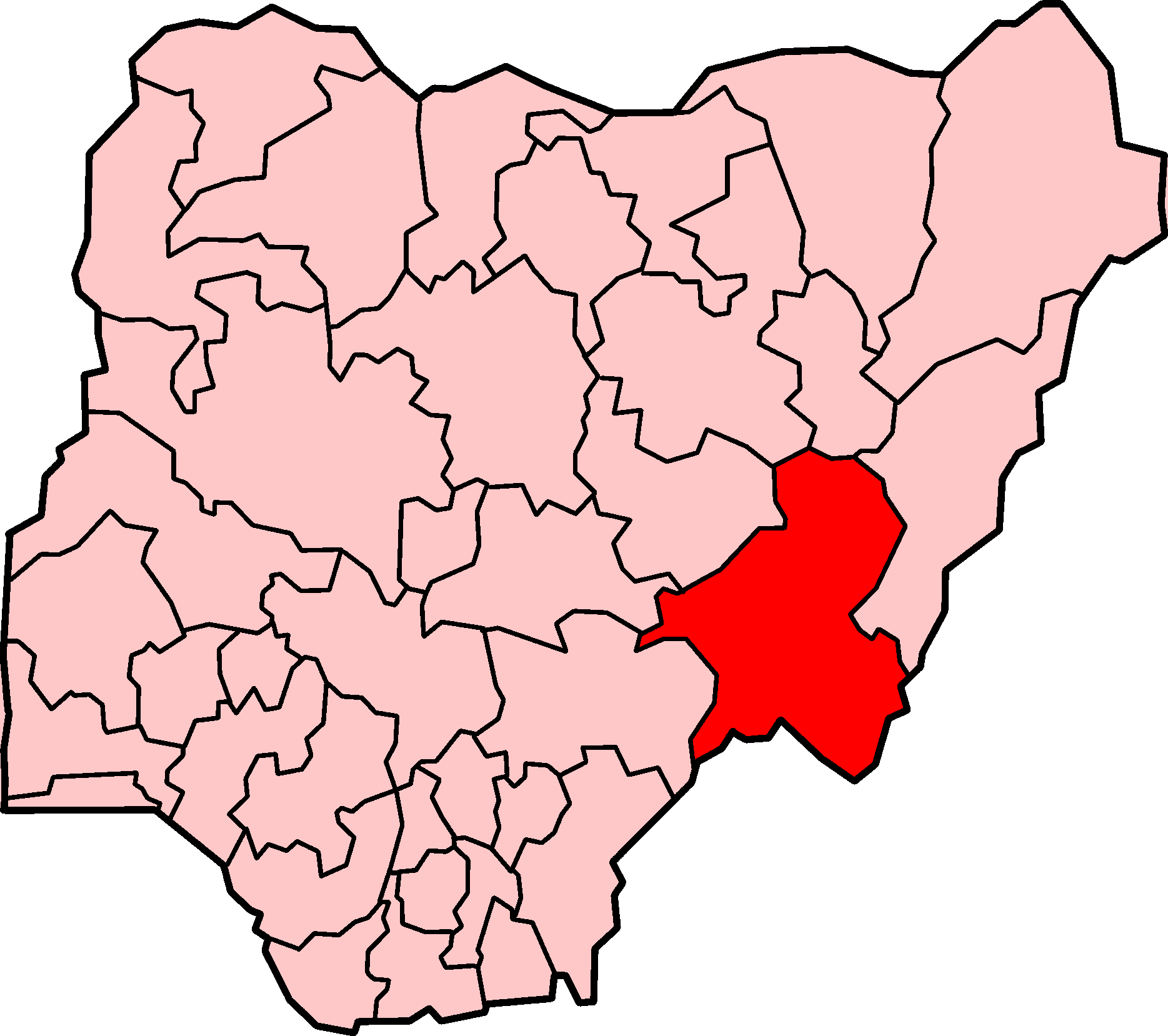
Taraba State in Nigeria

In the run-up to the 2007 elections, Danladi Baido won the PDP gubernatorial primaries but was later disqualified. Two months before the election, the PDP national secretariat replaced Baido with Danbaba Suntai, who had not stood in the primaries. Baido lent his support to Suntai, and in April 2007, Suntai won election as Governor of Taraba State. After the elections, relations between Suntai and Baido soured. The unsuccessful Action Congress candidate challenged the switch of PDP candidates and in February 2008, Baido joined this suit. In February 2009, Danladi Baido petitioned the Inspector General of Police, Mike Okiro over alleged SMS messages from Danbaba Suntai threatening to harm him and his family if he continued to appeal the election. In June 2009, Baido claimed that an attempt had been made to assassinate him, linking the incident to the alleged threats.

During his tenure as governor, Danbaba Suntai made efforts to fight corruption, crime and lack of discipline, while delegating authority and providing funds to the Local Government Areas. In January 2009, a group of Concerned Indigenes of Taraba State sent a petition to the Economic and Financial Crimes Commission (EFCC) and the Independent Corrupt Practices and Other Related Offences Commission (ICPC), with a copy to President Umaru Yar'Adua, concerning alleged fraudulent financial practices in Suntai's administration. Claims included unnecessary imports of foreign cars, use of foreign rather than local workers, and inflated road building contracts.

In October 2009, Suntai said he strongly supported religious and moral teaching aimed at reducing juvenile delinquency, crime and other vices. He said his administration was strongly behind both the Christian and Islamic faiths since both religions teach peace, love and unity. He initiated reforms to make local government administration more transparent. Among other effects, the monthly pension bill dropped from N33 million to N22 million, while pensioners began getting more regular payments. In November 2009, Danbaba Suntai commissioned a N540 million computerized stone-crushing and asphalt plant to provide road building materials. The plant was constructed by the state government but to be operated on a fully commercial basis. He ran successfully for reelection on 26 April 2011.

=== Accident ===
On 25 October 2012, Suntai was piloting a Cessna 208 and crashed near Yola Airport while on final approach. He survived the crash but was left with serious health challenges. He remained in office until the end of his second term on 29 May 2015.

== Death ==
Suntai's crash left him with serious health challenges. He died on 28 June 2017, almost 5 years after his crash in Houston, Texas, two days to his 56th birthday
