= Jolly Nyame =

Nigerian politician (born 1955)

Governor of Taraba State
- In office 29 May 1999 – 29 May 2007
- Deputy: Uba Maigari Ahmadu (1999–2004); Armanyau Abubakar (2004–2007)
- Preceded by: Aina Owoniyi
- Succeeded by: Danbaba Suntai
- In office 3 January 1992 – 17 November 1993
- Deputy: Danjuma Gani
- Preceded by: Adeyemi Afolahan
- Succeeded by: Yohanna Dickson

Personal details
- Born: Jolly Tavoro Nyame; 25 December 1955 (age 70) Zing, Northern Region, British Nigeria (now in Taraba State, Nigeria)
- Party: All Progressives Congress (since 2018)
- Other political affiliations: Social Democratic Party (1991–1993); Peoples Democratic Party (1998–2018)
- Spouse: Priscilla J. T. Nyame (m. 1981)
- Education: Bachelor's Degree in Theology, Emory University, U.S.
- Occupation: Politician

Jolly Tavoro Nyame (born 25 December 1955) is a Nigerian politician who served as the governor of Taraba State from 1999 to 2007. He previously served as governor from 1992 to 1993 during the short lived third republic.

== Early life ==
Nyame was born on 25 December 1955 in Zing in present-day Taraba State to Christian parents. In line with his Christian faith, he took up a vocation in priesthood and was ordained a Reverend in the United Methodist Church of Nigeria.

== Political life ==
Nyame joined politics in 1991, contested for governor of Taraba state in 1992 and won. His term as governor in 1993 was short-lived due to the military takeover of power.

In 1999, Nyame contested as a governorship candidate of the Peoples Democratic Party and won. He was also re-elected in 2003, making him the only individual to have won three governorship elections in Taraba state.

== Criminal charges ==
Upon leaving office in 2007, Nyame was charged by the Economic and Financial Crimes Commission (EFCC) for a fraud of ₦1.64 billion in a forty-one count charge of Fraud.

In 2007, Nyame admitted to misappropriating ₦180 million out of ₦250 million meant for stationery in Taraba state and offered to return the same.

=== Conviction ===
On 30 May 2018, Nyame was convicted by the High Court of the Federal Capital Territory, Abuja, under the ruling of Justice Adebukola Banjoko for the charges against him. He was sentenced to 14 years in prison and was asked to refund the money he diverted.

In November 2018, The Court of Appeal in Abuja affirmed his conviction on 29 counts. The Appellate court however reviewed the sentences imposed by the trial court and sentenced him to 5 separate 12 year term of imprisonment which were to run concurrently instead of the initial 14 year Jail term and ordered him to pay a fine of ₦185 million. On 7 February 2020, the Supreme Court affirmed the 12 year jail term Judgment and set aside the fines imposed on him by the courts on the grounds that they were outrageous and done without any prompting.

=== Pardon ===
On 14 April 2022, the federal government of Nigeria granted Nyame a presidential pardon. The action was criticised by civil society organisations and the general public.

== Personal life ==
Nyame is married to Priscilla J. T. Nyame.

== See also ==
- List of governors of Taraba State
