= Wildlife of Nigeria =

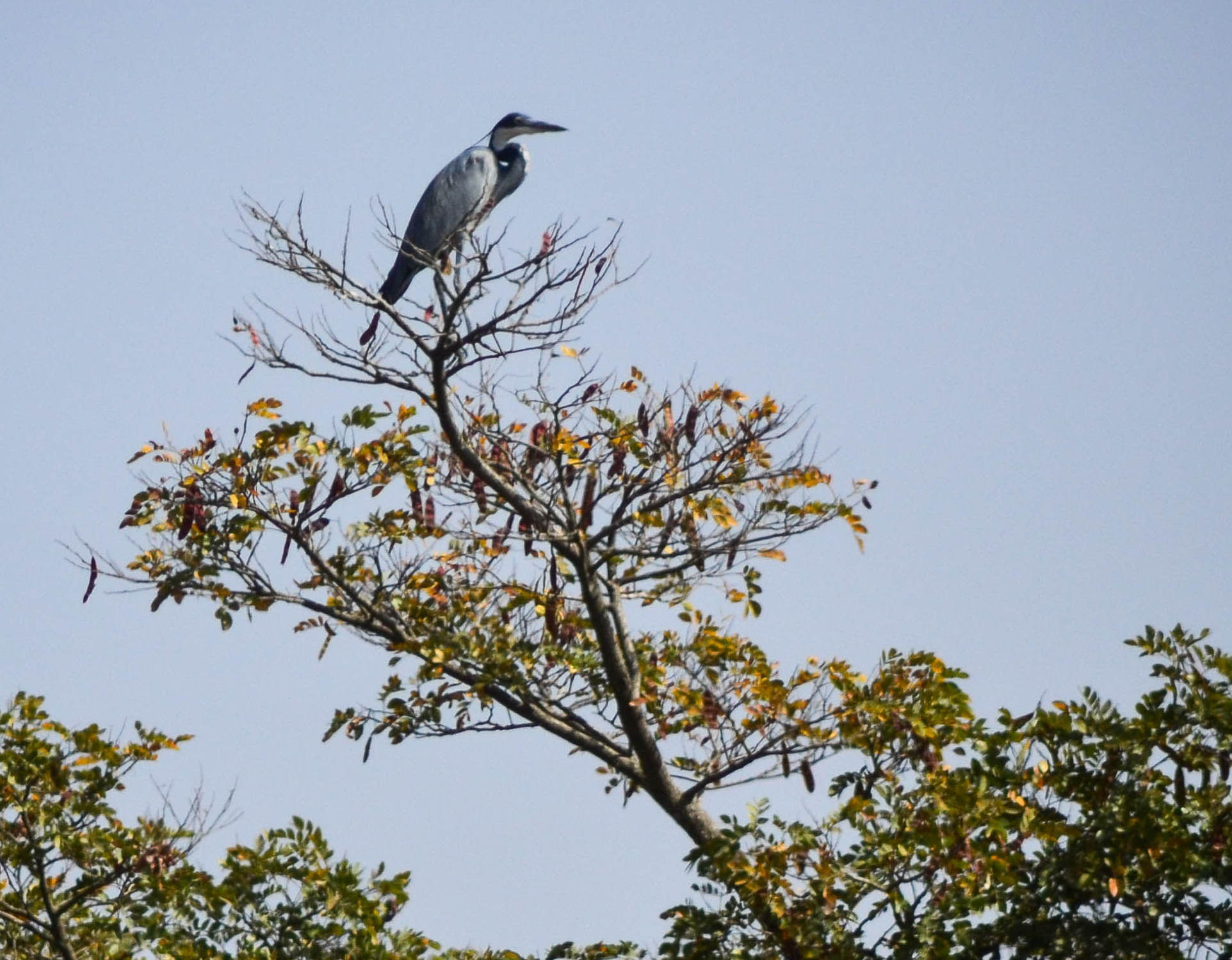
Black-headed heron

The wildlife of Nigeria consists of the flora and fauna of this country in West Africa. Nigeria has a wide variety of habitats, ranging from mangrove swamps and tropical rainforest to savanna with scattered clumps of trees. About 290 mammal species and 940 bird species have been recorded in the country.

== Geography ==
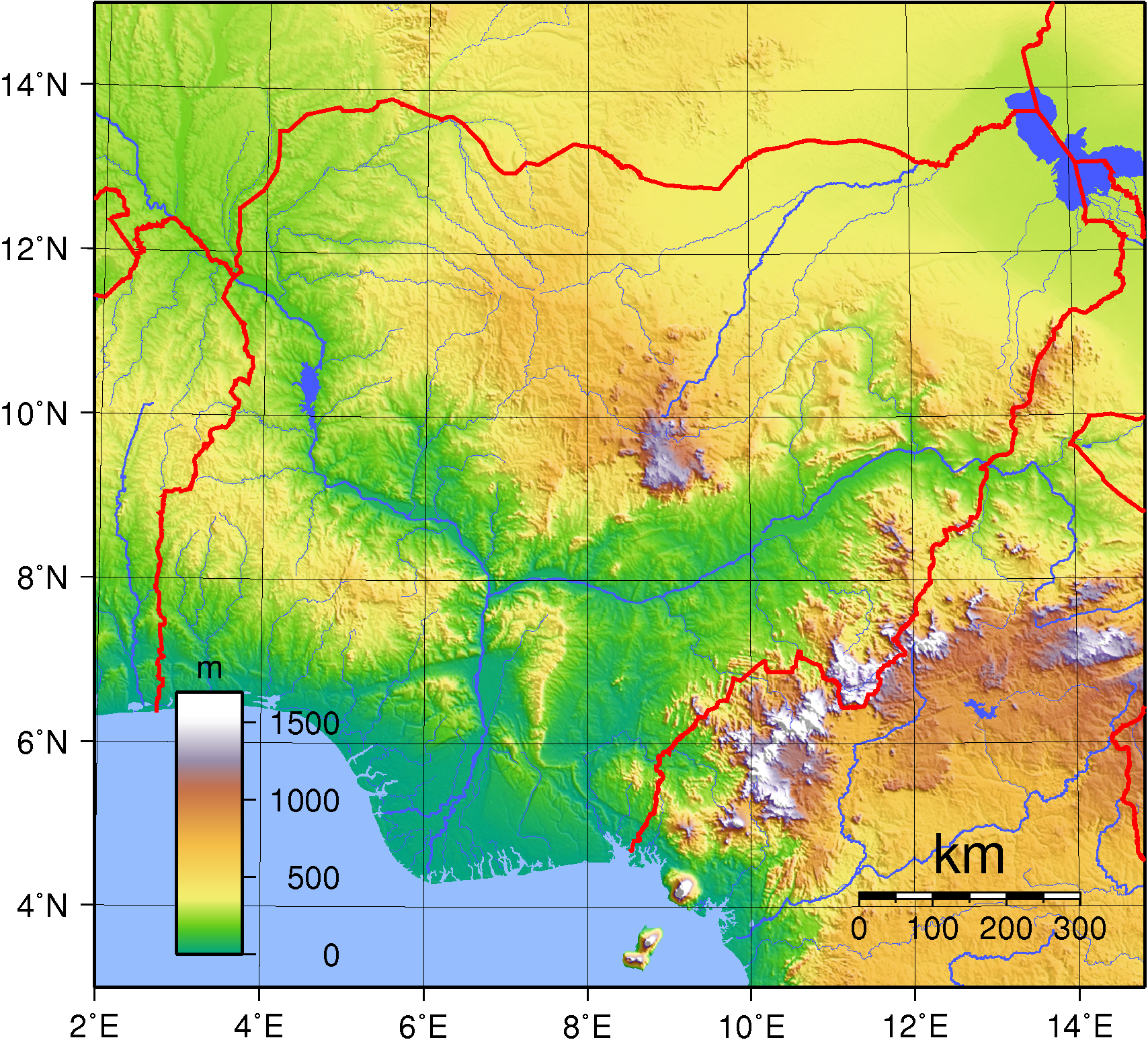
Topography of Nigeria

Nigeria is a large country in West Africa just north of the equator. It is bounded by Benin to the west, Niger to the north, Cameroon to the east and the Atlantic Ocean to the south. The country consists of several large plateaus separated by the valleys of the two major rivers, the Niger and the Benue, and their tributaries. These converge inland and flow into the Gulf of Guinea through a network of creeks and branches which form the extensive Niger Delta. Other rivers flow directly to the sea further west, with many smaller rivers being seasonal. The highest mountain is Chappal Waddi (2,419 m or 7,936 ft) on the Mambilla Plateau in the southeast of the country near the border with Cameroon. The Shere Hills (1,829 m or 6,001 ft) are another mountainous region located on the Jos Plateau in the center of the country. Major lakes include two reservoirs, Oguta Lake and Kainji Lake, and Lake Chad in the northeast. There are extensive coastal plains in the southwest and the southeast, and the coastline is low.

The wet season lasts from March to October, with winds from the southwest. The rest of the year is dry, with northeasterly harmattan winds blowing in from the Sahara. The coastal zone has between 1,500 and 3,000 mm (59 and 118 in) of rainfall per year, and the inland zones are drier except for the highland areas.

== Flora ==
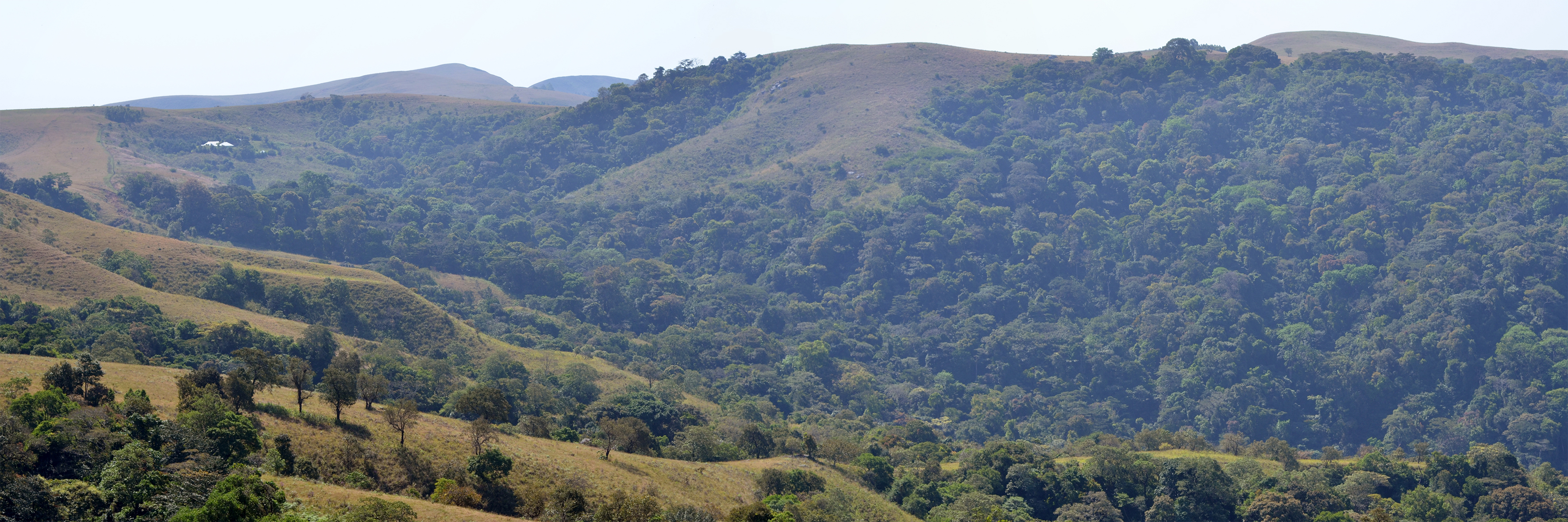
Ngel Nyaki Forest Reserve on the Mambilla Plateau

The most southerly part of the country is classified as "salt water swamp" or "mangrove swamp" because the vegetation consists primarily of mangroves. North of this is a fresh water swamp area containing salt-intolerant species such as the raffia palm, and north of this is rainforest. Further north again, the countryside becomes savanna with scattered groups of trees. A common species in riverine forests in the south is Brachystegia eurycoma.

These main zones can be further subdivided. The coastal swamp forest extends many kilometers inland and contains all eight West African species of mangrove, with Rhizophora racemosa being the dominant species on the outer edge, R. harrisonii in the central part and R. mangle on the inner edge. The mangrove swamps of the Niger Delta are estimated to be the breeding ground of 40% of the fish caught offshore. The rainforest zone stretches inland for about 270 km (170 mi) but its composition varies considerably, with rainfall decreasing from west to east and from south to north. In Omo Forest Reserve for example, the commonest trees are several species of Diospyros, Tabernaemontana pachysiphon, Octolobus angustatus, Strombosia pustulata, Drypetes gossweileri, Rothmania hispida, Hunteria unbellata, Rinorea dentata, Voacanga africana, and Anthonotha aubryanum.

Where the rainforest grades into the savanna woodland, dominant trees include Burkea africana, Terminalia avicennioides, and Detarium microcarpum. About one half of Nigeria is classified as Guinea savanna in the Guinean forest-savanna mosaic ecoregion, characterized by scattered groups of low trees surrounded by tall grasses, with strips of gallery forest along the watercourses. Typical trees here are suited to the seasonally dry conditions and repeated wildfires and include Lophira lanceolata, Afzelia africana, Daniellia oliveri, Borassus aethiopum, Anogeissus leiocarpa, Vitellaria paradoxa, Ceratonia siliqua, and species of Isoberlinia.

== Fauna ==
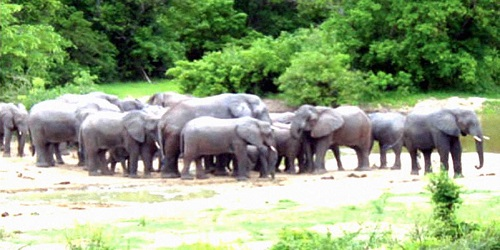
Elephants in Kamuku National Park

=== Mammals ===
A large number of mammal species are found in Nigeria with its diverse habitats. These include lions, leopards, mongooses, hyenas, side-striped jackals, African elephants, African buffaloes, African manatees, rhinoceroses, antelopes, waterbuck, giraffes, warthogs, red river hogs, hippopotamuses, pangolins, aardvarks, western tree hyraxes, bushbabies, monkeys, baboons, western gorillas, chimpanzees, bats, shrews, mice, rats, squirrels, and gerbils. Besides these, many species of whale and dolphin visit Nigerian waters.

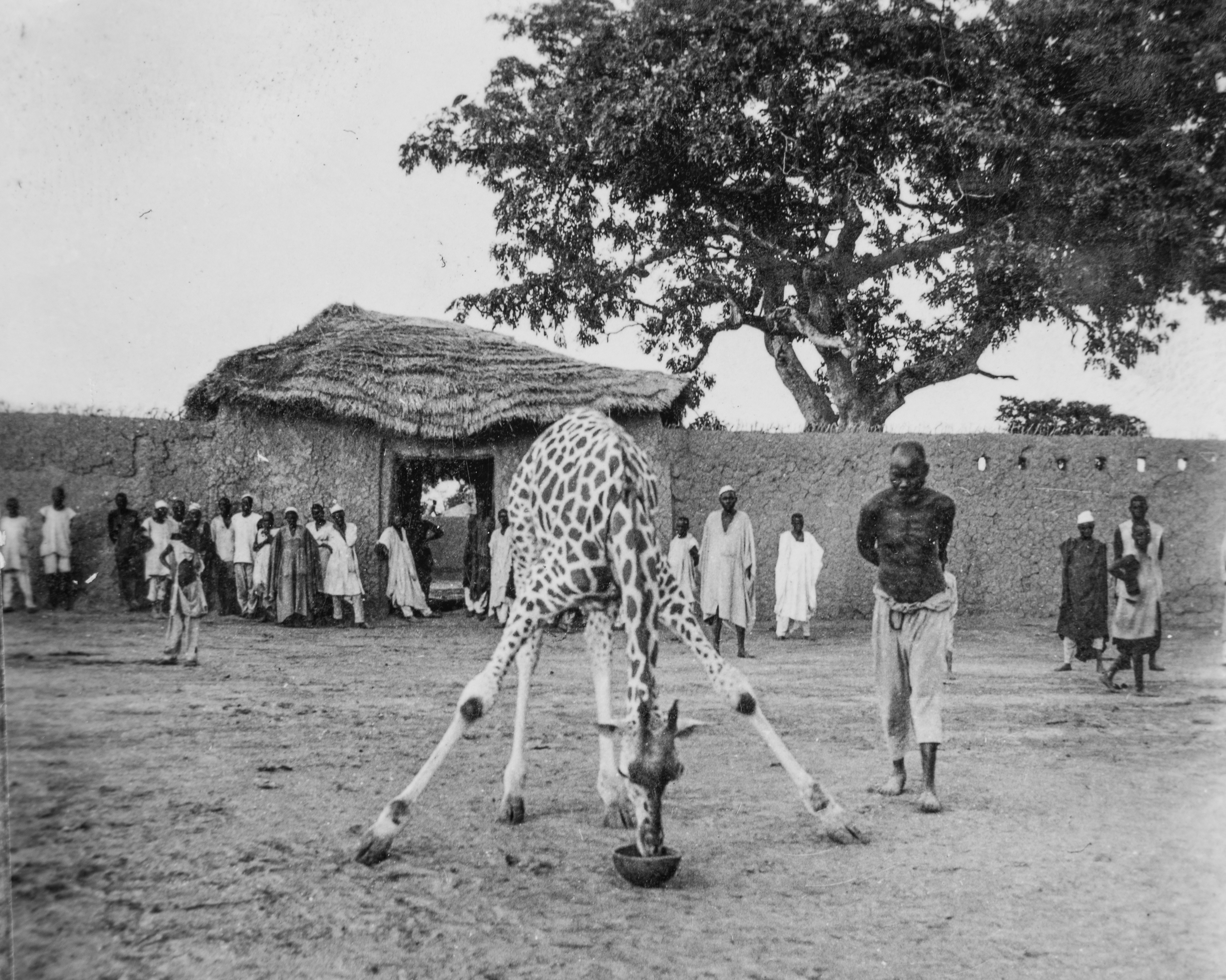
A tamed giraffe at Garkida (today in Hong, Adamawa State). Likely taken in the 1930s

=== Birds ===
About 940 species of bird have been recorded in Nigeria, five of them endemic to the country. Each geographical zone has its typical bird species, with few being found in both forest and savanna. Around the Oba Dam, east of Ibadan, various waterfowl can be seen including several species of heron and egret, African pygmy goose, comb-crested jacana, black-winged stilt, Egyptian plover, and black crake. In the adjoining rainforest, specialties include western square-tailed drongo and glossy-backed drongo, the African oriole and black-headed orioles, painted-snipe, several species of dove, Klaas' and diederik cuckoos, as well as kingfishers, bee-eaters, rollers, and bushshrikes, including the fiery-breasted bushshrike, flocks of iridescent starlings, and several species of Malimbus, a genus only found in West Africa. Some birds found in open savanna include hooded vulture, stone partridge, guineafowl, black-billed wood dove, black cuckoo, blue-naped mousebird, and Abyssinian roller. Birds endemic to Nigeria include the Ibadan malimbe, the Jos Plateau indigobird, the rock firefinch and the Anambra waxbill.
