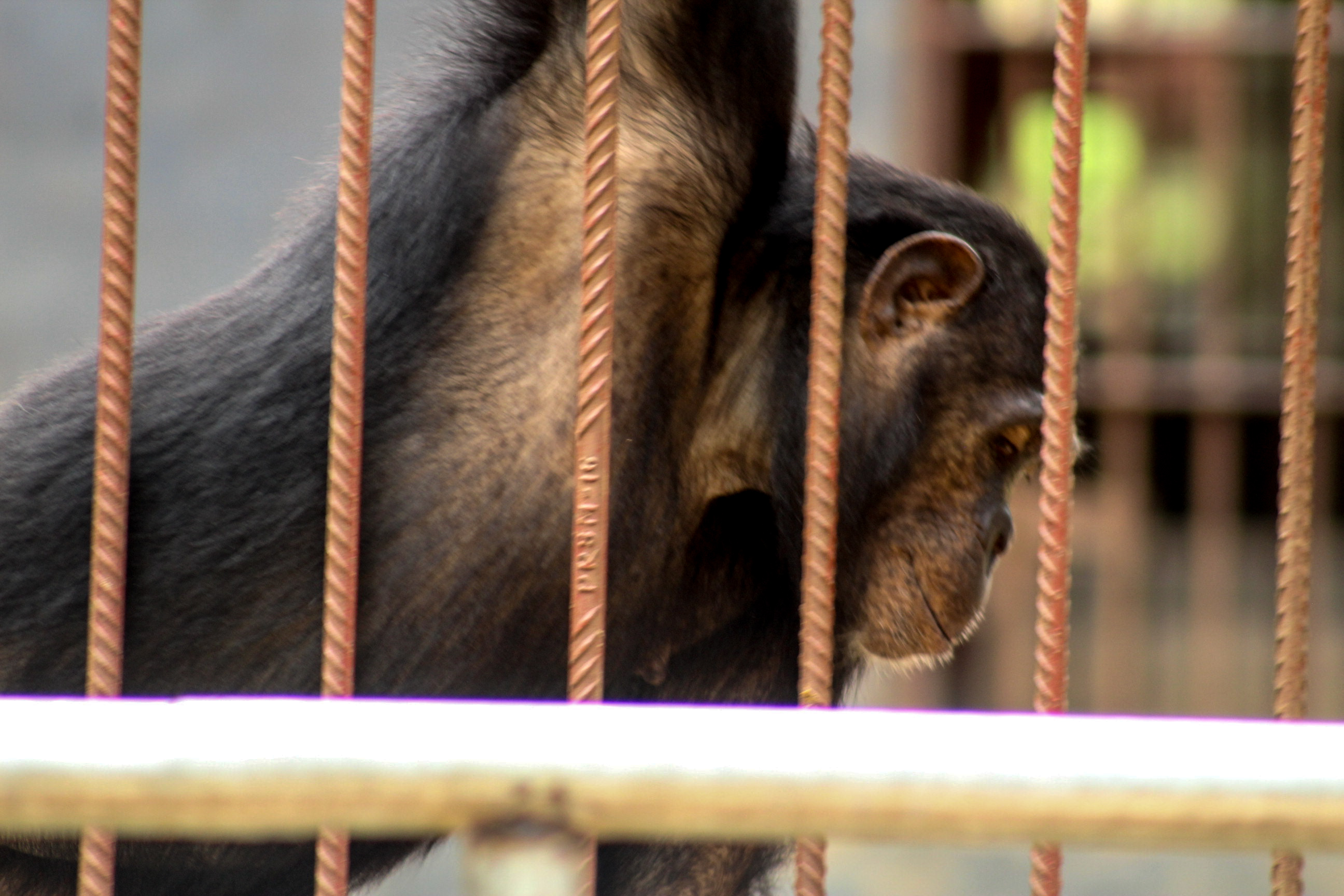

Conservation status
- Endangered (IUCN 3.1)

Scientific classification
- Kingdom: Animalia
- Phylum: Chordata
- Class: Mammalia
- Order: Primates
- Superfamily: Hominoidea
- Family: Hominidae
- Genus: Pan
- Species: P. troglodytes
- Subspecies: P. t. ellioti

Trinomial name
- Pan troglodytes ellioti (Matschie,1914)

Synonyms
- Pan troglodytes vellerosus

= Nigeria-Cameroon chimpanzee =

Subspecies of ape

The Nigeria-Cameroon chimpanzee (Pan troglodytes ellioti) is a subspecies of the common chimpanzee which inhabits the rainforest along the border of Nigeria and Cameroon. Male Nigeria-Cameroon chimpanzees can weigh up to 80 kg (180 lb) with a body length of up to 1.2 m (3 ft 11 in) and a height of 1.3 m (4 ft 3 in). Females are significantly smaller. Like the nominate subspecies, the Nigeria-Cameroon chimpanzee has been classified as Endangered by the IUCN, indicating a high risk of extinction in the near future.

== History ==
The Nigeria-Cameroon chimpanzee has been classified as the fourth subspecies of chimpanzee since 1997 and is the least studied of these subspecies. Its populations are falling across its limited natural range, with between 3500 and 9000 individuals remaining.

== Description ==
Nigeria-Cameroon chimpanzees weigh around 80 kg (180 lb) for adult males in captivity and 65 kg (143 lb) for adult females in captivity. They stand about 1–1.7 m (3 ft 3 in – 5 ft 7 in) tall when erect.

== Subpopulations ==
The Nigeria-Cameroon chimpanzee is found in:

- Gashaka-Gumti National Park, Nigeria (900–1,000 individuals)
- Ngel Nyaki Forest Reserve, Nigeria
- Banyang-Mbo Wildlife Sanctuary, Cameroon (500–900 or 800–1,450 individuals)
- Ebo Wildlife Reserve, Cameroon (626–1,480 individuals)
- Mbam Djerem National Park, Cameroon (at least 500 individuals)

During a 2006 survey in southwestern Nigeria, the Nigeria-Cameroon chimpanzee was found in Idanre Forest Reserve, Ifon Forest Reserve, Oluwa Forest Reserve, Omo Forest Reserve, Ise Forest Reserve, Ologbo Forest Reserve, and Okomu National Park. Chimpanzees were found in Ondo State, Ekiti State, Edo State, and Ogun State. Later surveys also confirmed that chimpanzees are also present in Akure-Ofosu Forest Reserve. This population is on the verge of extinction due to habitat loss, disease, and human activities like hunting. The genetic affiliations of this population are also unclear.

A June 2008 report said the Edumanom Forest Reserve was the last known site for chimpanzees in the Niger Delta.

== Habitat ==
The subspecies inhabits tropical rain forests and montane forests at elevations of up to 2,750 m (9,020 ft) above sea level. There are also populations that primarily inhabit savanna habitats.

== Lifespan ==
Individuals can live for 40 to 60 years.

== Status and conservation ==
The Nigeria-Cameroon chimpanzee is recognised as the most threatened and least widely distributed of all the common chimpanzee subspecies, facing a high likelihood of extinction in the coming decades.
