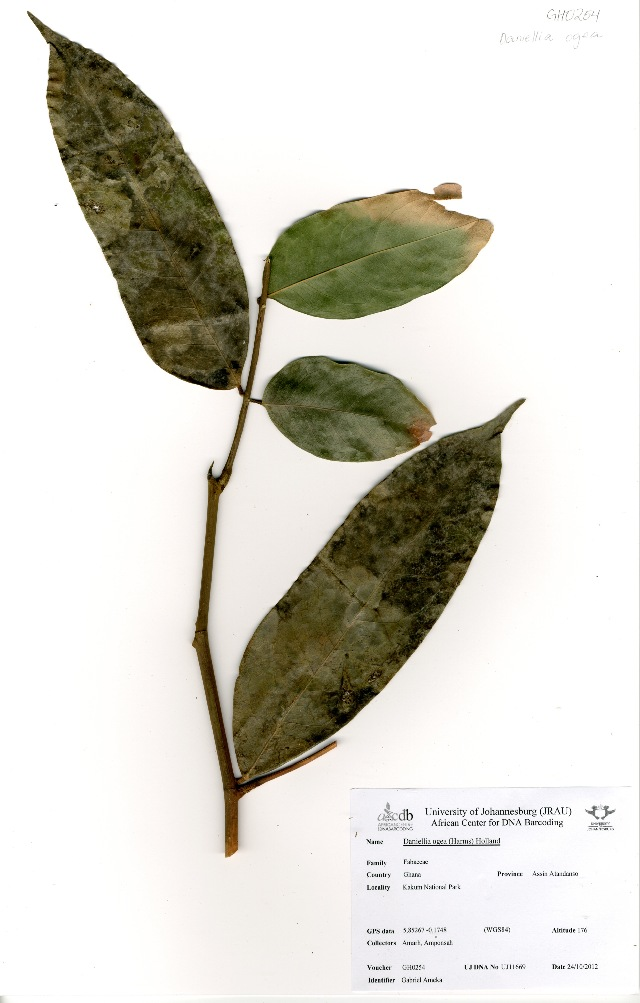
- Specimen of gum copal tree (Daniellia ogea) collected at Kakum National Park (Assin Atandanso; though documented so, the coordinates indicate Aburi Botanical Gardens), Ghana.

Scientific classification
- Kingdom: Plantae
- Clade: Tracheophytes
- Clade: Angiosperms
- Clade: Eudicots
- Clade: Rosids
- Order: Fabales
- Family: Fabaceae
- Genus: Daniellia
- Species: D. ogea

Binomial name
- Daniellia ogea (Harms) Rolfe ex Holland

= Daniellia ogea =

Species of tree

Daniellia ogea is a species of tree that belongs to the family Fabaceae. It is also known locally as the gum copal tree, the Benin copal, or the Accra copal, and it is traded under the name Faro.

== Description ==
Daniellia ogea is a large emergent species that is capable of reaching 45 m (148 ft) tall and a diameter of more than 120 cm (47 in) wide, its bark is distinctively striate or warty and greyish in color with a slash that is brownish. The trunk is cylindrical and straight and the glabrous stems have transverse scars of falling off stipules and bud scales. Leaves are paripinnately compound, alternate and with stipules and petioles present, the former sheds when young. Leaflets are broadly lanceolate to elliptic in shape, up to 9 cm (3.5 in) long and 3.5 cm (1.4 in) wide with a base that is rounded to cuneate and an apex that is acuminate and margins that are entire. Purple like flowers are borne on pedicels in axillary or terminal panicles. Fruit is a papery pod that is up to 9 cm (3.5 in) long and 4 cm (1.6 in) wide.

== Distribution and habitat ==
It occurs in tropical western Africa from Senegal to Gabon. It is found in evergreen and moist semi-deciduous forest zones, in rocky slopes or well drained valleys.

== Uses ==
Gum obtained from the wood is used is applied in various uses such as a protective coating, as a fragrant for clothes and also as a cosmetic ointment.
