= Donga River =

River in Nigeria and Cameroon

Coordinates: 7.162128°N 10.571594°E

Northwest region of Cameroon. Donga River in the north.

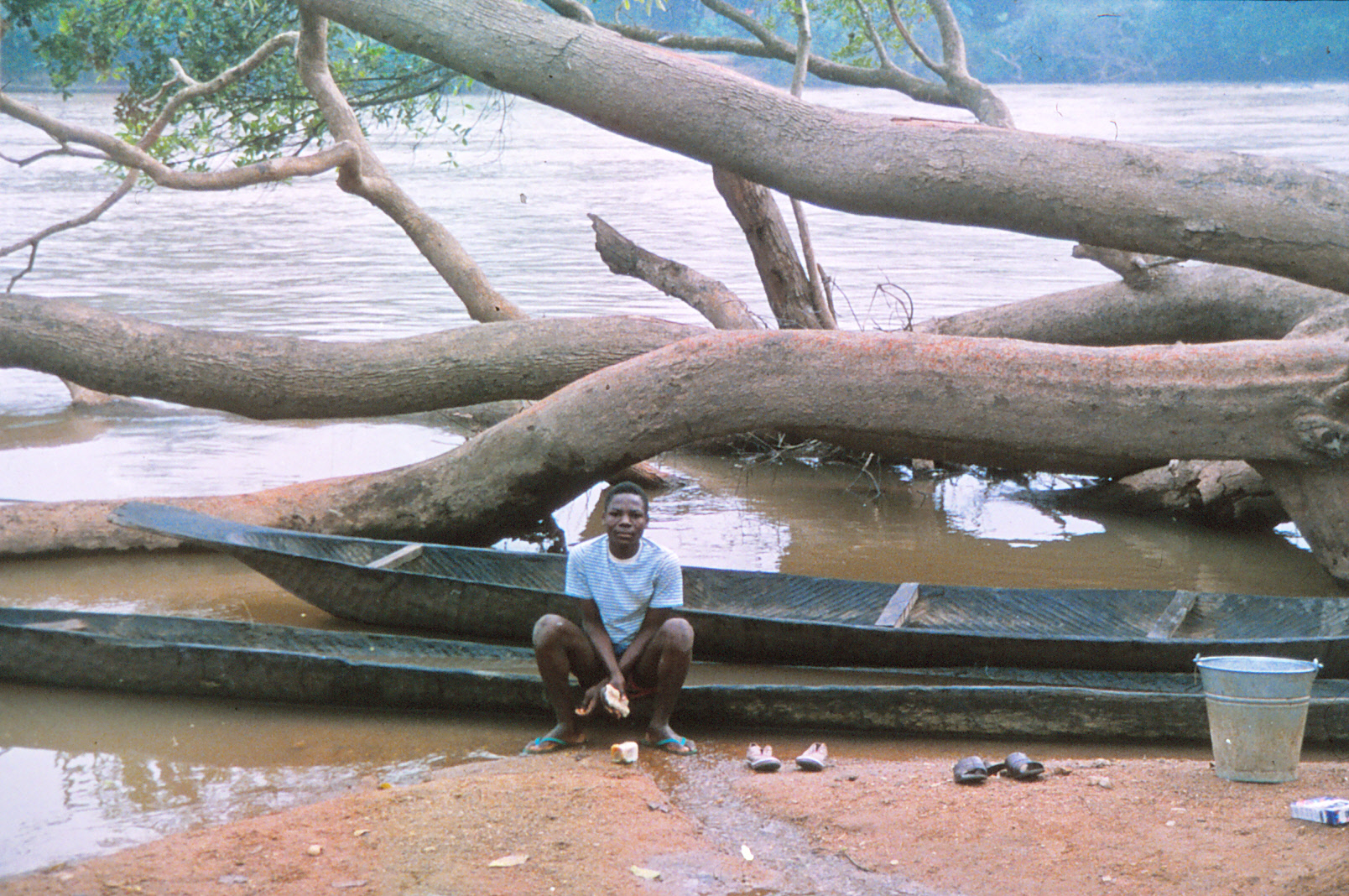
Donga River at Abong, Nigeria in December 1990

The Donga River is a river in Nigeria and Cameroon. The river, which arises from the Mambilla Plateau in Eastern Nigeria, forms part of the international border between Nigeria and Cameroon, and flows northwest to eventually merge with the Benue River in Nigeria. The Donga watershed is 20,000 square kilometres (7,700 sq mi) in area. At its peak, near the Benue the river delivers 1,800 cubic metres (64,000 cu ft) of water per second.

In Taraba State, Nigeria, there are three forest reserves, Baissa, Amboi and Bissaula River, in the Donga river basin. They lie on the slopes and at the foot of the Mambilla Plateau, south-west of Gashaka Gumti National Park.

== Pollution ==
Research reveals that pesticides were the predominant organic pollutant in the Donga river.

== Climate ==
The annual average temperature is around 33°C but high level of cold in January and an increased rainfall in August. Rainfal percentage is 40.35% with 54.98% relative humidity. It is usually very warm in March with 40.44°C, and an average wind of 8.84km/h.

== See also ==
- Communes of Cameroon
