= William Freeman Daniell =

British surgeon and botanist

William Freeman Daniell (1818–1865) was a British army surgeon and botanist. From 1847 to 1856 he was stationed in Gambia, the Gold Coast (modern Ghana) and Sierra Leone, where he studied tropical diseases and botany.

He corresponded with William Jackson Hooker and Charles Darwin

The genus Daniellia of legumes was named after him by John Joseph Bennett.
