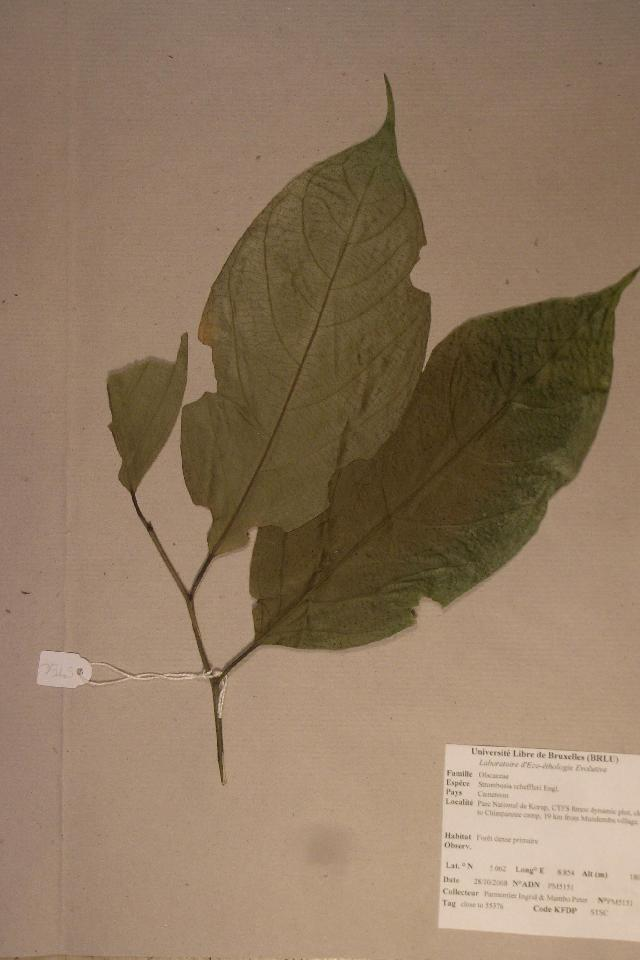

Scientific classification
- Kingdom: Plantae
- Clade: Tracheophytes
- Clade: Angiosperms
- Clade: Eudicots
- Order: Santalales
- Family: Olacaceae
- Genus: Strombosia
- Species: S. scheffleri

Binomial name
- Strombosia scheffleri Engl.

= Strombosia scheffleri =

Species of plant

Strombosia scheffleri is a medium-sized tree that is native to Tropical Africa, the species is sometimes planted as a shade tree in coffee and cocoa plantations. It belongs to the family Olacaceae.

== Description ==
Strombosia scheffleri grows up to 25 to 35 meters tall with a straight trunk that is sometimes buttressed at the base. The bark is light brown to greyish or yellowish green in color and flaky, while the slash is creamy revealing a reddish inner bark; its stems tend to hang downwards. Leaves are opposite and have petioles; leaflets are broaldly elliptic in outline, up to 20 cm long and 9 cm wide. Inflorescence are arranged in axillary fascicles with flowers that are greenish yellow in color. Fruit is a subglobose berry, up to 1.9 to 2.5 cm in diameter. The plant's fruiting season is between May and September.

== Distribution and habitat ==
Occurs in Tropical Africa in the Guinea-Congolian biographical region eastwards to southern Sudan and southwards to Mozambique. Found in Afromontane rain forests and gallery forest.

== Ecology ==
The fruits and seeds are eaten by red colobus monkeys, blue monkeys, mangabays, and redtail monkeys while seeds are generally dispersed over long distances by bats.

== Uses ==
It is planted as a shade tree in banana, coffee and cocoa plantations.
