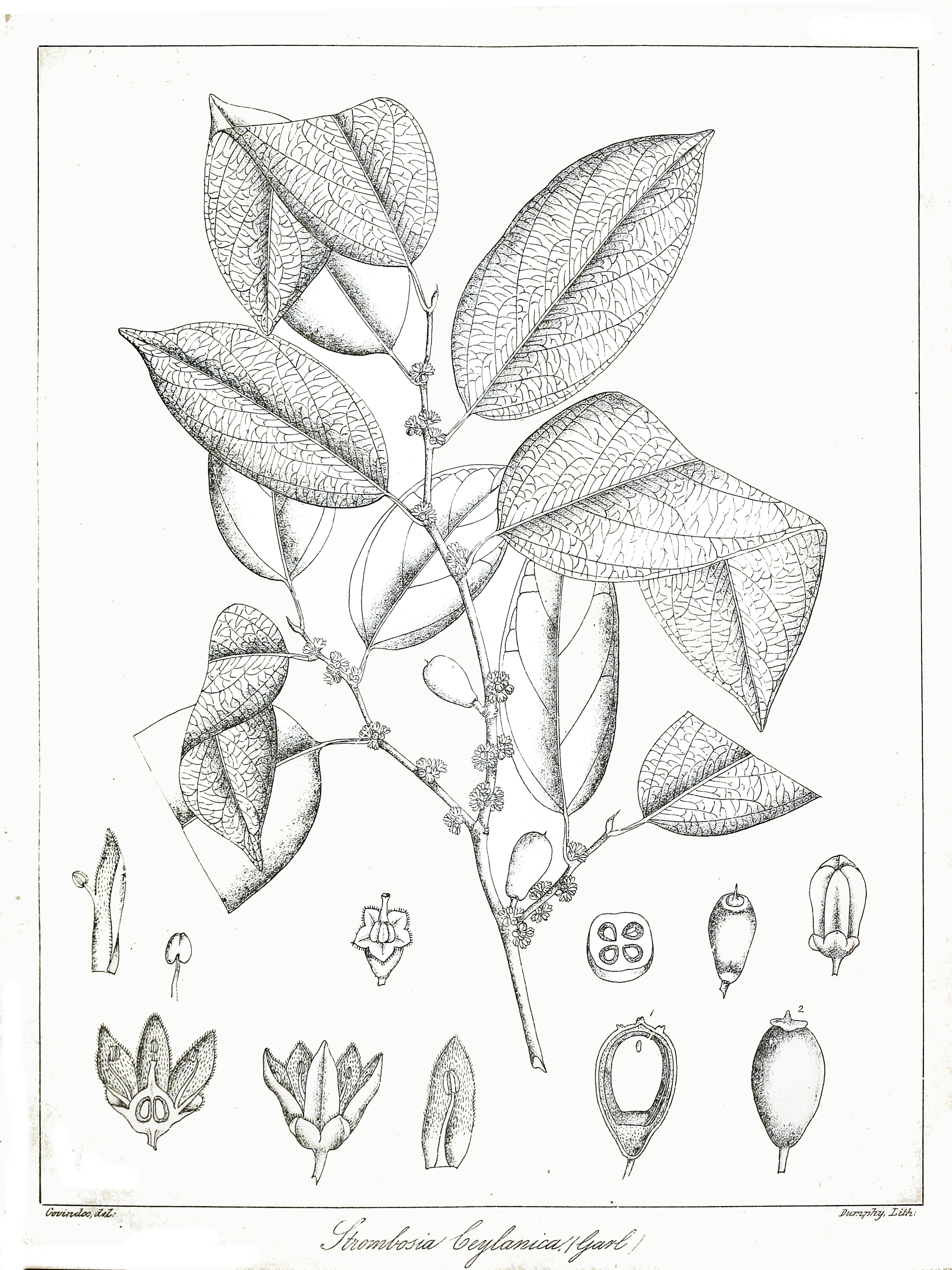

Scientific classification
- Kingdom: Plantae
- Clade: Tracheophytes
- Clade: Angiosperms
- Clade: Eudicots
- Order: Santalales
- Family: Olacaceae
- Genus: Strombosia
- Species: S. ceylanica

Binomial name
- Strombosia ceylanica Gardner

Synonyms
- Anacolosa maingayi Mast.; Lasianthera membranacea (Blume) Miq.; Lavallea ceylanica (Gardner) Baill.; Stemonurus membranaceus Blume; Strombosia maingayi (Mast.) Whitmore; Strombosia membranacea (Blume) Valeton

= Strombosia ceylanica =

Species of tree

Strombosia ceylanica is a tree in the family Olacaceae. The specific epithet ceylanica is from the Latin meaning "of Ceylon".

== Description ==
Strombosia ceylanica grows up to 40 metres (130 ft) tall with a trunk diameter of up to 60 centimetres (24 in). The bark is grey to brown. The flowers are greenish white. The roundish fruits are pink to purple and measure up to 2.5 cm (1 in) in diameter. The wood is used in house construction.

== Distribution and habitat ==
Strombosia ceylanica grows naturally in India's Kerala state, Sri Lanka, Peninsular Malaysia, Sumatra, Java and Borneo. Its habitat is forests from sea-level to 1,000 metres (3,300 ft) altitude.
