= Mambila massacre =

Reported 2017 massacre of Fulani herdsmen in Mambila Plateau, Nigeria

Mambila massacre was a reported 2017 massacre of Fulani herdsmen in Mambila Plateau, Nigeria.

The nature of the killings is disputed, and few independent sources (other than residents) exist, apparently, with the Buhari administration accused of ignoring news of, or otherwise not sufficiently focusing on this incident, possibly due to the unusual nature of the attacks (herdsmen usually being accused of massacres).

This was followed a smaller outbreak of violence months later.
