= Chappal Waddi =

Mountain in Nigeria

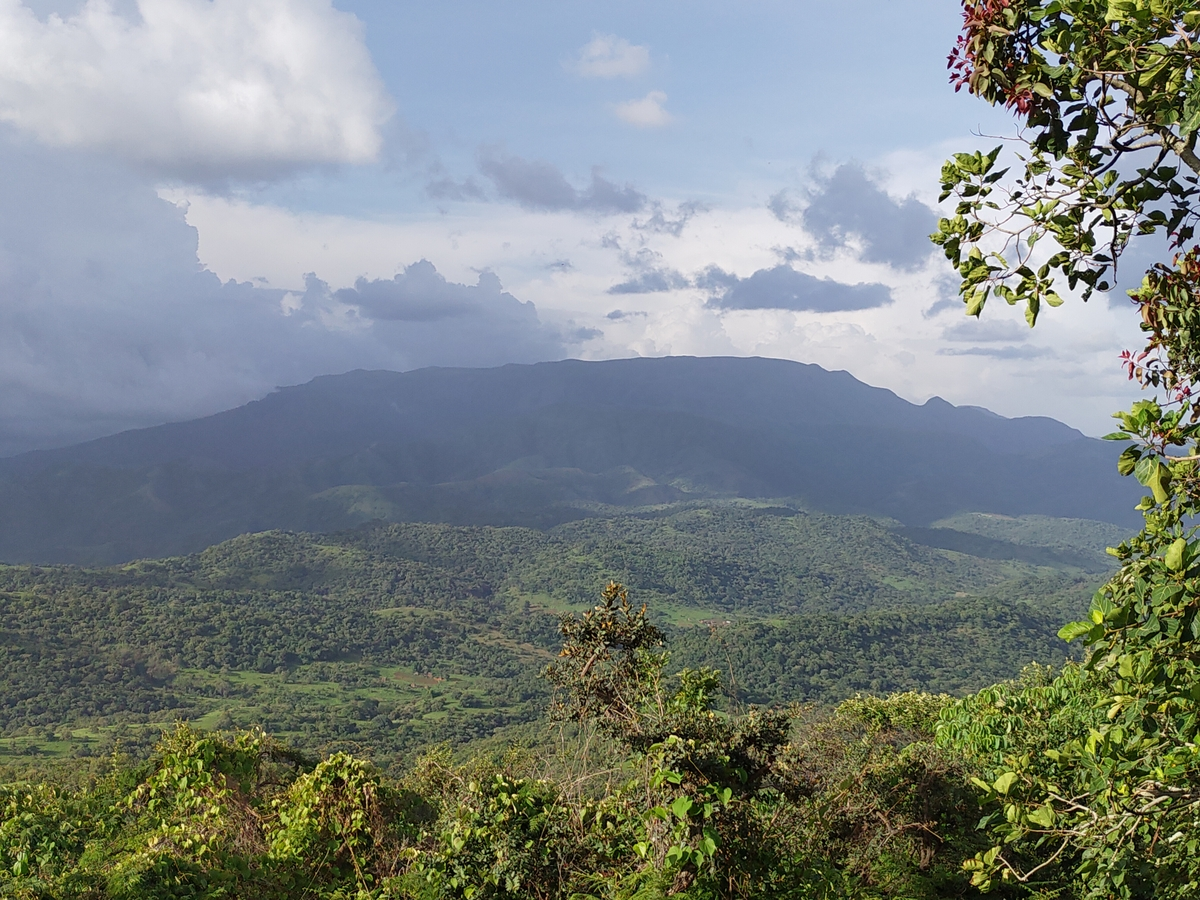

Highest point
- Elevation: 2,419 m (7,936 ft)
- Prominence: 1,165 m (3,822 ft)
- Listing: Country high point Ribu
- Coordinates: 07°02′10″N 11°42′54″E

Geography
- Location within Nigeria
- Location: Nigeria / Cameroon

Chappal Waddi (also known as the Mountain of Death) is located in Nigeria and, at 2,419 m (7,936 ft), is the country's highest point and the highest in West Africa. This peak, whose original and indigenous name is "Gang Peak" is steeped in enthralling ancient Mambilla mythologies. It represents the headquarters of some ancient mythological organizations. It is located in Taraba State, near the border with Cameroon, on the edge of the Gashaka Gumti Forest Reserve and the Gashaka-Gumti National Park on the Mambilla Plateau. It is a part of the Bamenda-Alantika-Mandara Mountain chain of Nigeria and Cameroon. According to local Mambilla legends, good fortunes or poor harvests in the agricultural cycles of the Mambilla Plateau were determined at Gang Mountain.

== Gallery ==
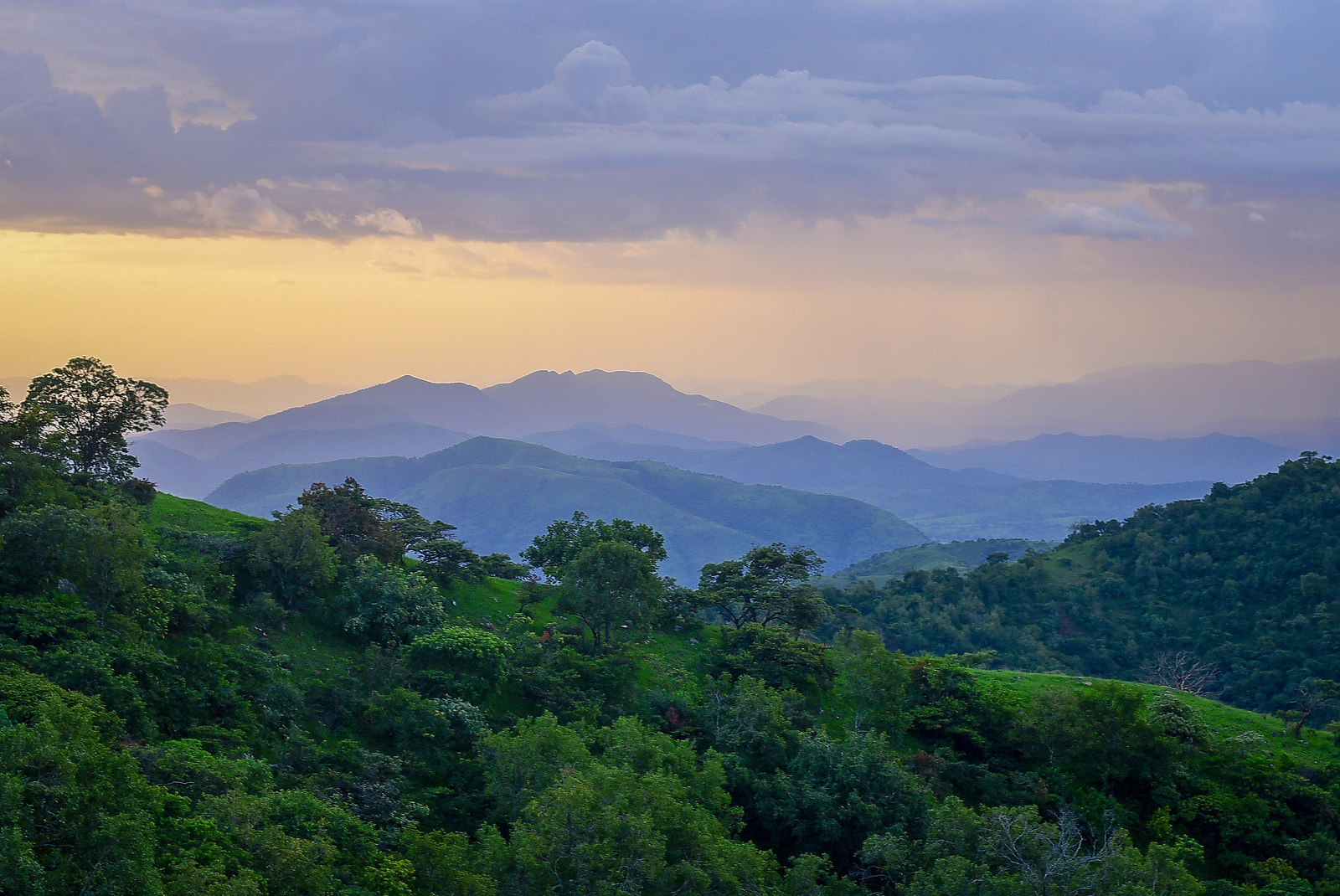
Dusk in a remote section of Gashaka-Gumti National Park

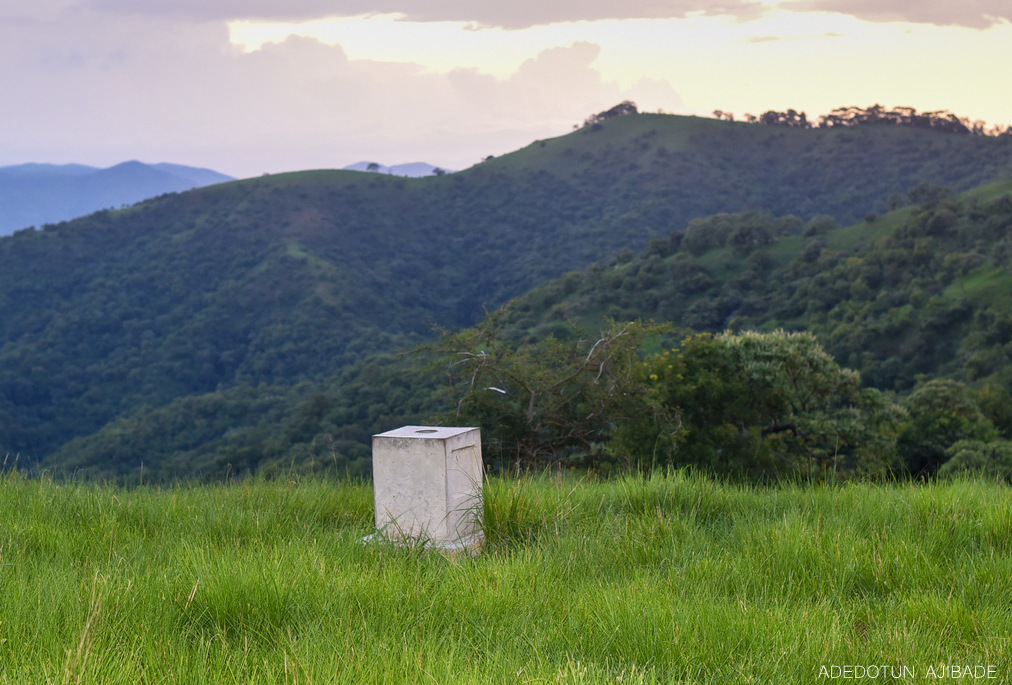
Boundary along the Nigerian-Cameroon border in Gashaka-Gumti National Park

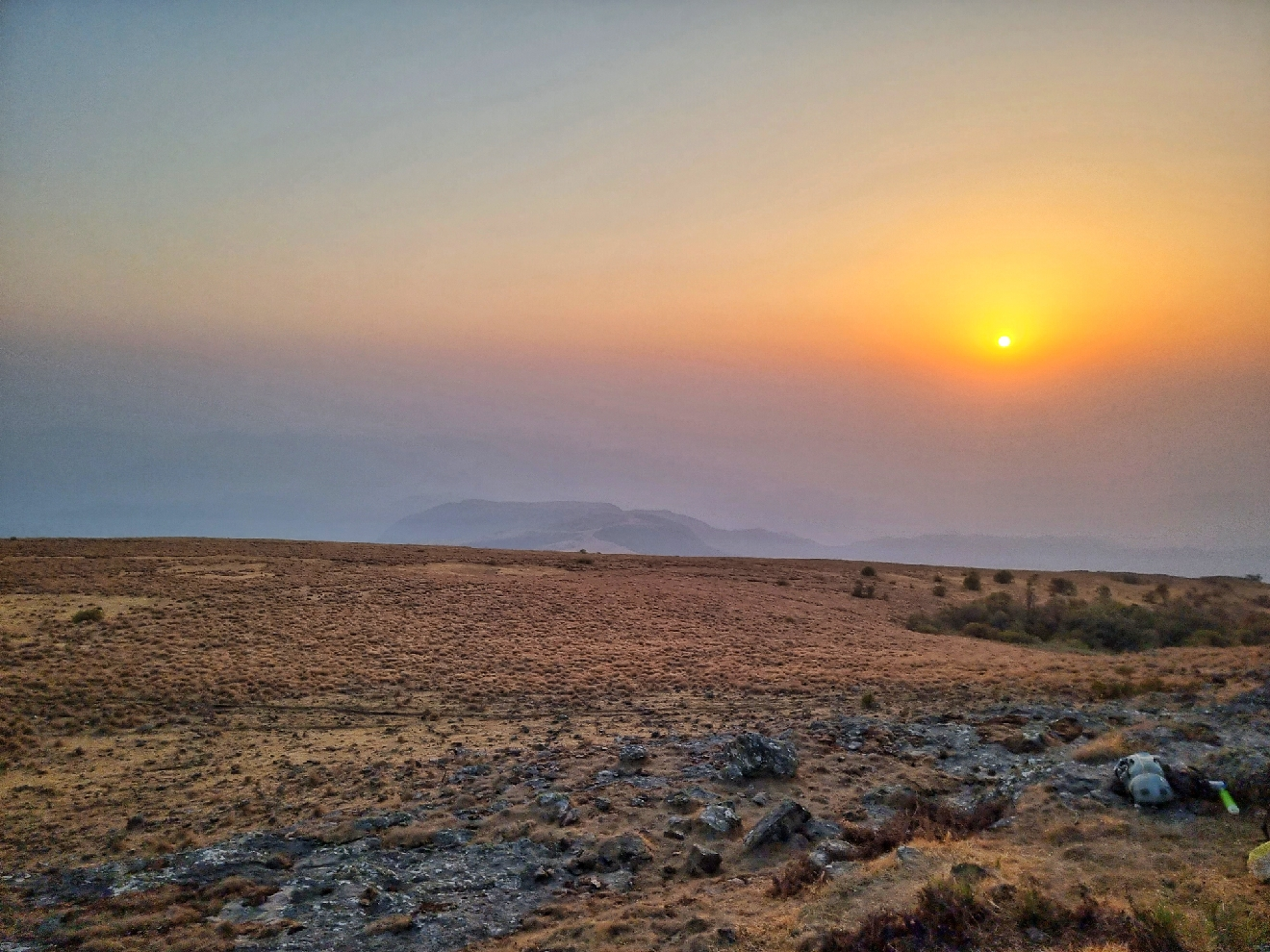
Sunset on Chappal Waddi

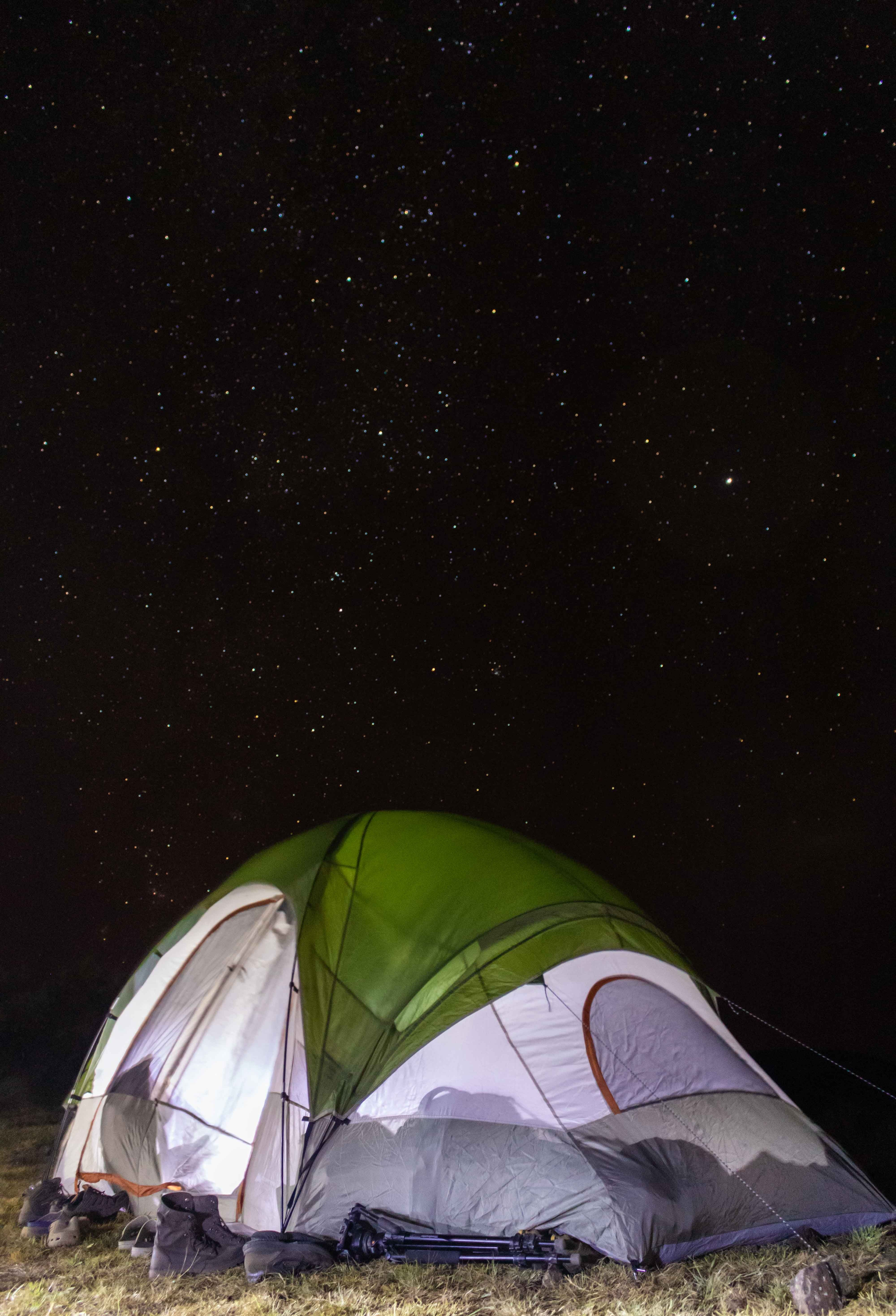
Camping on Chappal Waddi

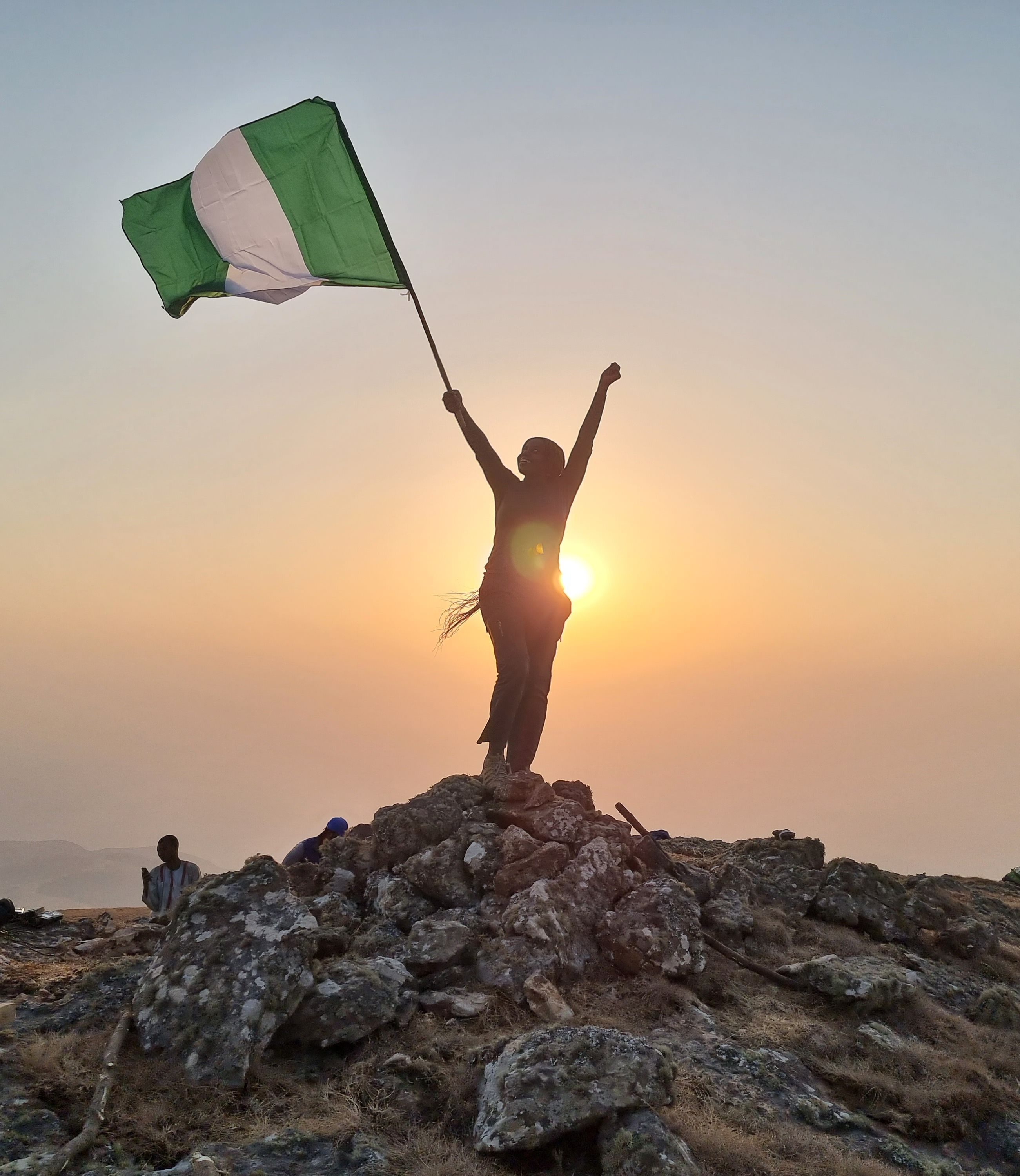
Woman holding a Nigerian flag on the summit of Chappal Waddi
