= Daniellia oblonga =

Conservation status
- Vulnerable (IUCN 3.1)

Scientific classification
- Kingdom: Plantae
- Clade: Tracheophytes
- Clade: Angiosperms
- Clade: Eudicots
- Clade: Rosids
- Order: Fabales
- Family: Fabaceae
- Genus: Daniellia
- Species: D. oblonga

Binomial name
- Daniellia oblonga Oliv.

Species of legume

Daniellia oblonga is a species of plant in the family Fabaceae. It is found in Benin, Cameroon, Equatorial Guinea, and Nigeria. It is threatened by habitat loss.
