= Mambilla Plateau =

Geological formation in Nigeria

- Taraba Highland
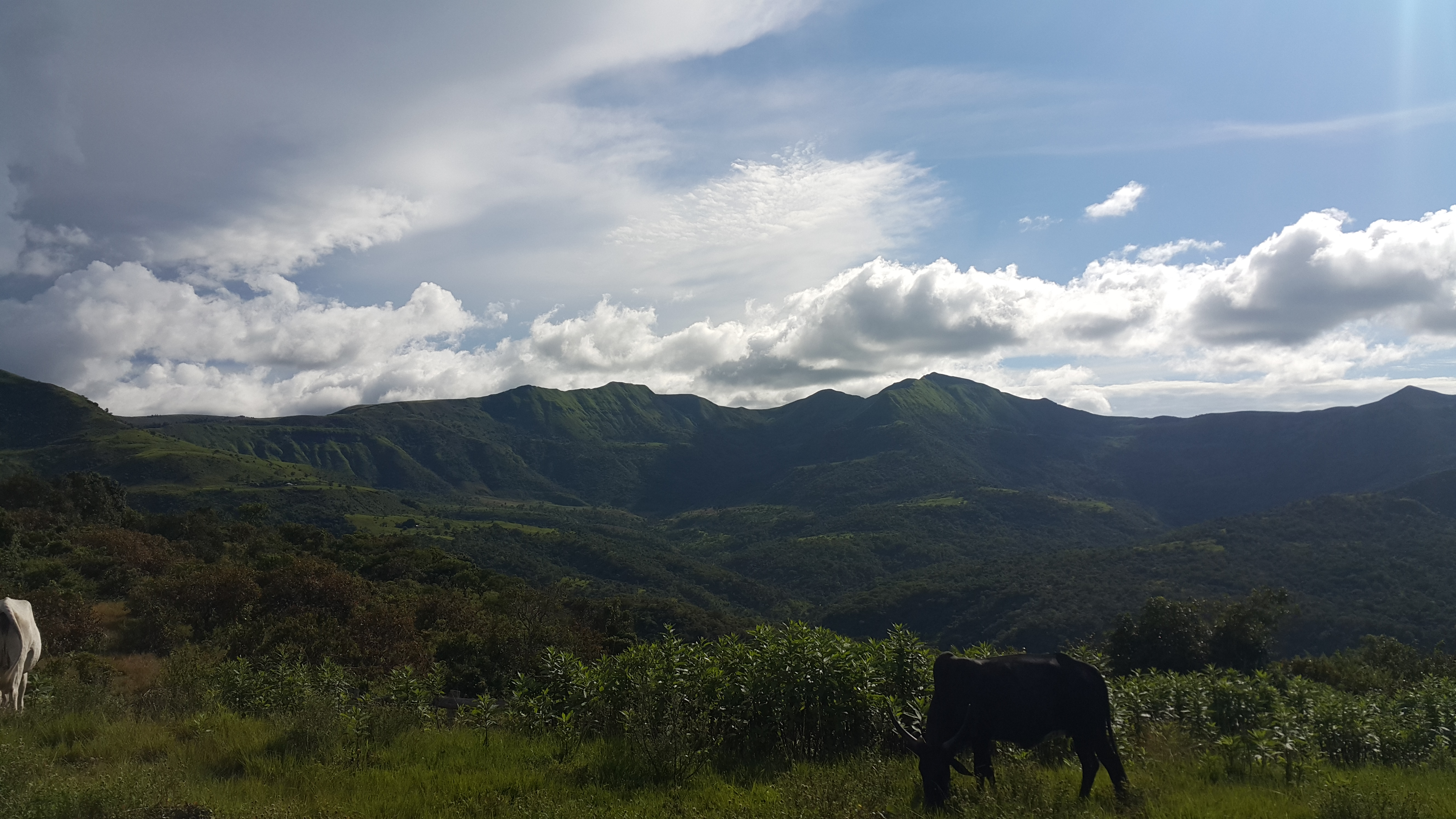

Highest point
- Peak: Gang; Chappal Waddi (Fula)
- Elevation: 2,419 m (7,936 ft)

Dimensions
- Area: 9,389 km^{2} (3,625 mi^{2})

Geography
- Countries: Nigeria, Cameroon
- State(s): Taraba State and southern Adamawa State
- Region: Nigeria's Eastern Jut into Cameroon
- Range coordinates: 7°20′N 11°43′E

The Mambilla Plateau is a plateau in the Taraba State of Nigeria. The Mambilla Plateau has an average elevation of about 1,600 metres (5,249 ft) above sea level, making it the highest plateau in Nigeria. Some of its villages are situated on hills that are at least 1,828 metres (5,997 ft) above sea level. Some mountains on the plateau and around it are over 2,000 metres (6,562 ft) high, like Gang or Chappal Waddi which has a height of 2,419 metres (7,936 ft) above sea level. It is the highest mountain in Nigeria and in West Africa. The Mambilla Plateau measures about 96 km (60 mi) along its curved length; it is 40 km (25 mi) wide and is bounded by an escarpment that is about 900 m (2,953 ft) high in some places. The plateau covers an area of over 9,389 square kilometres (3,625 mi^{2}).

== Geography ==
The Mambilla Plateau is located in the southeastern part of Taraba State of Nigeria under Sardauna local government area. The Mambilla Plateau constitutes one of Taraba State's largest local government areas. There are numerous towns on the plateau, with the largest being Gembu. The plateau has its south and eastern escarpments standing along the Cameroonian border, while the remainder of its northern escarpment and its western slope are in Nigeria. The Mambilla Plateau is hilly with deep gorges, and travelers are constantly passing from one panoramic view to the other. The plateau is entirely covered by soil with occasional occurrence of granite. The plateau is dissected by many streams, notably the Donga River and Taraba River, with both having their sources on/from the Mambilla Plateau.

The Mambilla Hydroelectric Power Station is proposed for construction in Western Mambilla near the Nigeria-Cameroon border, within an anticipated completion date of 2030, although it has been on the drawing boards for upwards of 48 years. Nigeria's largest game reserve, the Gashaka/Gumti Game Reserve, is located north of Chappal Waddi on the northern border of the Mambilla Plateau.

== Climate ==
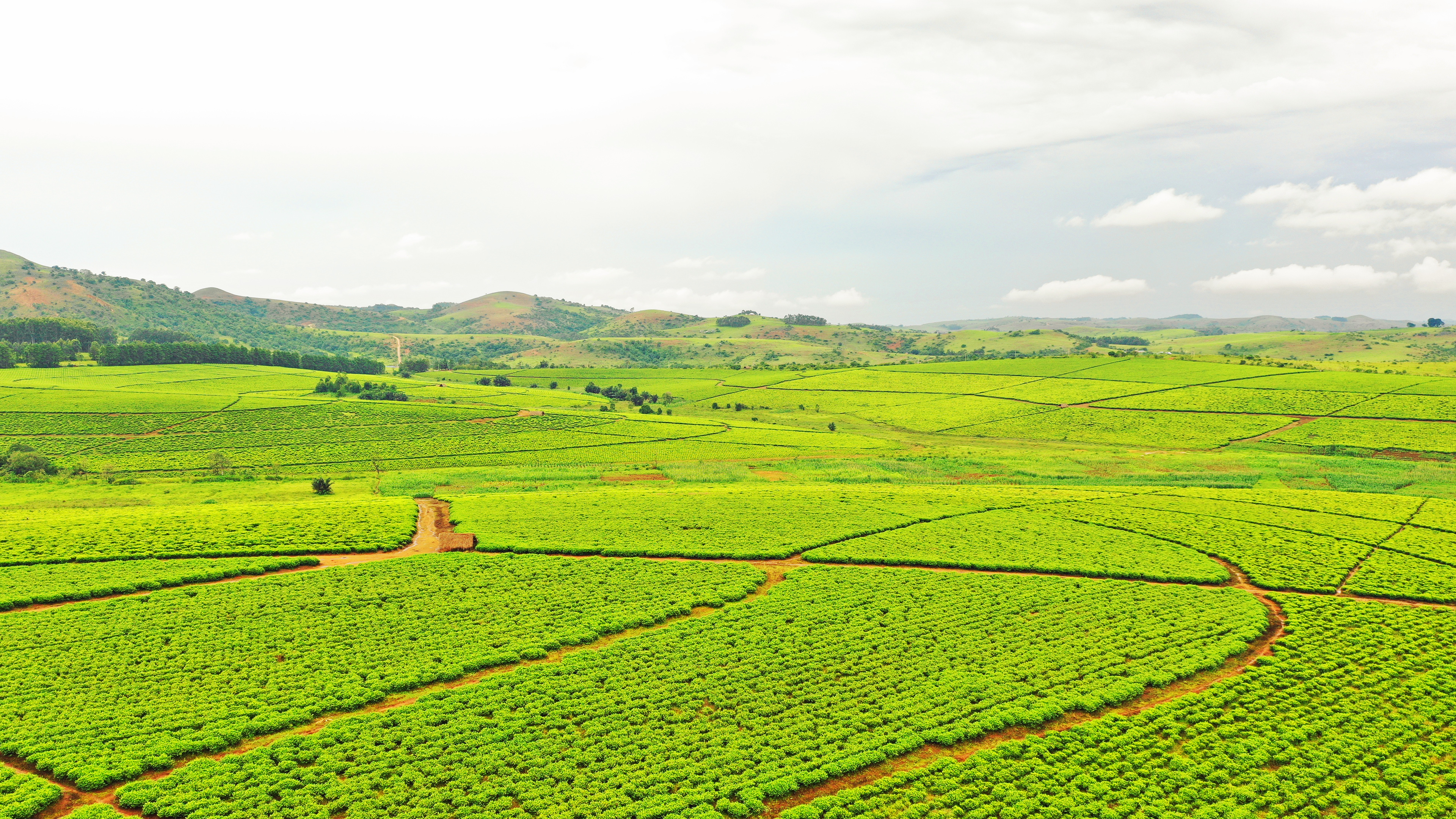
The Kakara tea farm, located in Mambilla. It is West Africa's only highland tea plantation.

The climate of the plateau is comparatively cold. Daytime temperatures hardly ever exceed 25 °C (77.0 °F) making it the coolest region in Nigeria. Strong winds prevail during the daytime and the rainy season lasts from mid-March until the end of November. As a result of its high elevation, the plateau experiences temperate weather conditions but on a smaller scale because of its location in a tropical environment. The rainy season on the Mambilla Plateau is associated with frequent and heavy rainfall because of orographic activities on the plateau involving moist winds from the south Atlantic Ocean in southern Nigeria and the steep escarpments of the plateau. The Mambilla Plateau receives over 1850 millimetres of rainfall annually.

== Vegetation ==
Vegetation on the plateau comprises low grasses with trees being noticeably absent except for man-made forest planted by German colonialists during the period of German administration of the Cameroons (c. 1906-1915) and other Nigerian government tree planting programs. The predominant vegetation cover is the low, velvet grass akin to the English rat-tail grass, known locally here as "gwur" grass. It is a major ritual emblem of the local traditional religion. The plateau is the only region of Nigeria that grows the tea plant on a large scale and there are several tea farms, although the sector remains mostly underdeveloped. It is also home to the Gashaka Gumti National Park, which is the largest national park and protected area in all of Nigeria, as well as the Majang Forest known officially as Ngel Nyaki Forest Reserve, both of which harbor rare and endangered West/Central African plant and animal species endemic to the area.

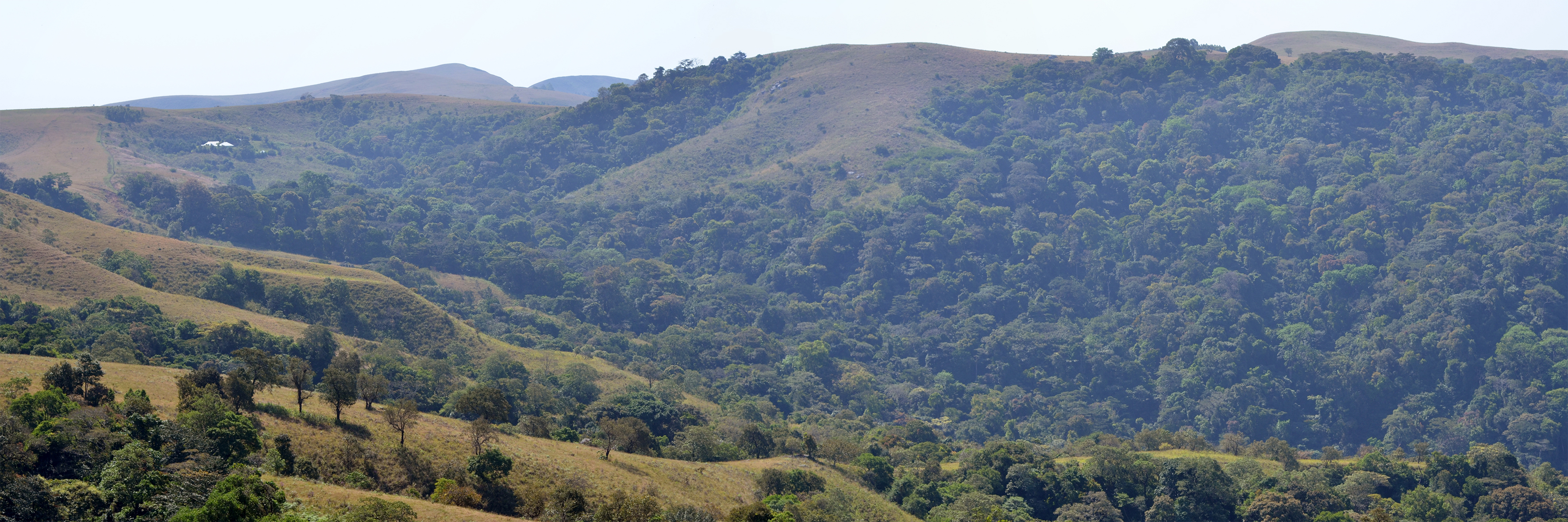
Ngel Nyaki Forest Reserve in the plateau

The eucalyptus tree is the dominant tree in these man made forests as a result of the easily adaptability of the eucalyptus tree to the height and the cool climatic conditions on the plateau. The abundance of low lush green grasses on the plateau has attracted a large number of cattle, whose advent beginning during British rule affected the plateau's vegetation. This has resulted in overgrazing and widespread erosion on the plateau and has created problems between the cattle herders, referred to as the Fulanis and the indigenous people, the Mambila.

== People ==
The major, original and predominant group of the Mambilla Plateau are the Mambilla people. The largest minority groups are the fulanis and kaka people who came centuries later after the mambilla people settled in the Area .The 60,000-km2 Mambilla region straddling the borderlands here has been identified as containing remnants of "the Bantu who stayed home" as the bulk of Bantu-speakers moved away from the region (see Bantu expansion).

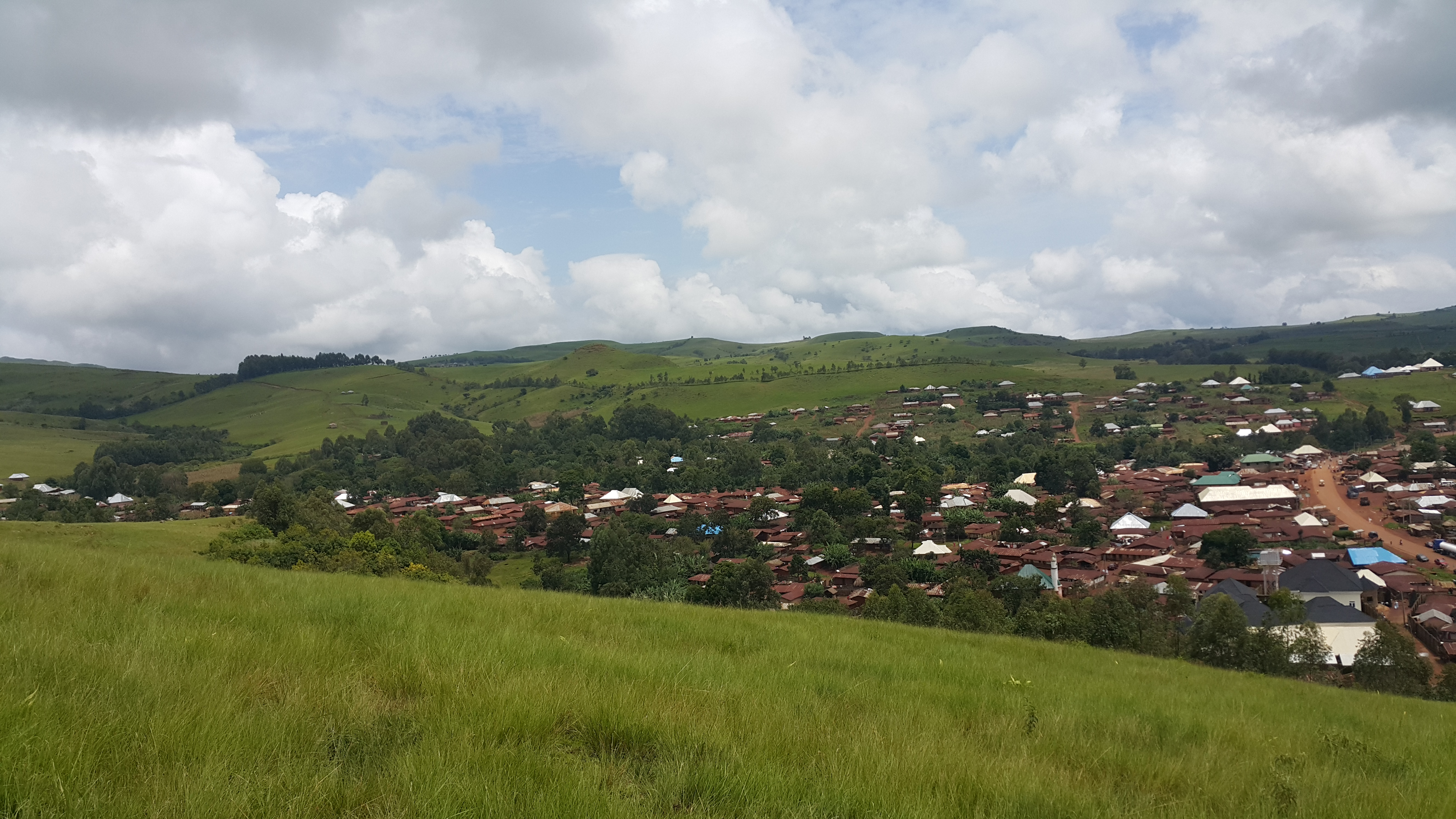
Mai Samari town

Since the British occupation and thereafter, there has been immigration of other groups including the Yamba, and trading communities of Igbo, Wimbum (Kambu), Hausa and Banso. Of these, only the Yamba established some 4 old settlements upon their immigration. The rest of the new entrants lay no claim to ancestral lands, but are business or occupational migrants without ancient or ancestral villages of their own. All Banso and Kambu (Wimbum) villages are to be found only in Cameroon Republic, some quite distant from the Nigerian border. The vast majority of the people of Mambilla Plateau speak Mambilla as their first language. English is the official language today, while Fulfulde the language of the Fulani, introduced in British times has been employed as trade language in modern times.

Christianity and Islam are the main religions today, having gradually displaced the Mambilla Traditional Religion that was based on the Suu system, which was the predominant religion before the coming of Christian missionaries (from the 1920s) and Hausa and Wawa itinerants. These new religions became particularly visible after the 1960s.

== See also ==
- Mambila people
- Mambila massacre
- Ngel Nyaki Forest Reserve
- Bantu expansion
