= Gum copal =

Gum copal is a resin produced by the sap of forest tree in the genus Daniellia. Due to common impurities and differences in regions, gum copal ranges in color from black to yellow to white. Gum copal, along with ivory and slaves, was a significant export from East Africa in the 19th century. It can have an appearance similar to amber and may be mistaken for it. Unlike amber, gum copal is usually only 100–1,000 years old and it has not yet fossilized.

== Source locations ==
Gum copal is most commonly found in East Africa and Indonesia, and is also found in tropical regions such as South America, Malaysia and the Philippines.

== Comparison to amber ==
Throughout history, amber and gum copal have been mistaken for each other, as it is extremely difficult to discern between the two. A drop test using an alcohol or other solvent will leave amber unaffected, while copal's surface will become sticky. A heat test can also be used as amber will soften and blacken its surface and copal will begin to melt.

Another difference between the two lies in what specimens are inside the material. As both amber and gum copal are produced from tree sap hardening, insects and other organisms can be trapped inside (an idea which provided the basis for DNA extraction in Jurassic Park). Depending on whether this organism can still be found alive in the present or recent past can give reference to the age and identification of the sample.

Gum copal is popularly used as incense. It is also used as a varnish or waterproofing material. When heated with certain oils it becomes nearly transparent. It can be used as an ingredient in adhesives, perfumes, printing ink, paints, and films.

Gum copal is sold primarily in two forms. The first is as powder, which is usually mixed with turpentine to make varnish. The other is as natural "rocks" which can be used in many different ways.

=== Commercial grades ===
Prime white soft (PWS) is the highest grade of gum copal. It is white in color and 99–100% purity. It is used for making varnish for wood surfaces and it dries to a hard and shiny film. Such varnish is high-luster and resistant to external scratches.

DBB grade is pebble-sized and whitish yellow in color with about 90–95% purity. This is an economy grade, ideal for production of low-end varnishes. Its solubility is good. It can contain some black copal, but it is still easily dissolved in alcohol solvent mixtures. It is the most common grade for use in incense.

White soft (WS) is the lowest grade of gum copal, larger chunks, black in color with about 60% purity. The impurities include tree bark and soil.

The powder leftover from the processing of PWS and DBB is usually used for varnish.
