= Strombosia nana =

Scientific classification
- Kingdom: Plantae
- Clade: Tracheophytes
- Clade: Angiosperms
- Clade: Eudicots
- Order: Santalales
- Family: Olacaceae
- Genus: Strombosia
- Species: S. nana

Binomial name
- Strombosia nana Kosterm.

Species of plant

Strombosia nana is a tree in the family Olacaceae. It is endemic to Sri Lanka. Its taxonomic description is unresolved yet.

== Ecology ==
It is found in the rain forest understory of wet zone Sri Lanka and widely found in the Sinharaja Rainforest.

== Culture ==
Known as "හොර කහ - hora kaha" by Sinahalese people.
