= Strombosia grandifolia =

Scientific classification
- Kingdom: Plantae
- Clade: Tracheophytes
- Clade: Angiosperms
- Clade: Eudicots
- Order: Santalales
- Family: Olacaceae
- Genus: Strombosia
- Species: S. grandifolia

Binomial name
- Strombosia grandifolia Hook.f. ex Benth

Synonyms
- Lavalleopsis grandifolia (Hook.f. ex Benth.) Tiegh. ex Engl.; Comoneura klaineana Pierre; Cosmoneuron klaineanum Pierre; Lavalleopsis densivenia Engl.; Lavalleopsis klaineana Engl.; Lavalleopsis longifolia De Wild.; Strombosia klaineana Pierre

Species of tree

Strombosia grandifolia is an understorey tree native to West and Central Africa belonging to the family Olacaceae.

== Description ==
A medium-sized tree that is capable of reaching 25 metres (82 ft) in height, it has a short trunk that is up 6 metres (20 ft) high and a diameter that is up to 60 centimetres (24 in). The crown is wide spreading while the bark is greyish to brown in colour, and a slash that is reddish brown. Leaves have petioles that can reach 3 centimetres (1.2 in) long, they tend to have a shiny upper surface and are dark to pale green in colour. Leaflets are ovate, oblong or elliptic in shape, up to 30 centimetres (12 in) long and 16 metres (52 ft) wide, its base is cuneate to obtuse while top is acute to acuminate while edges are curved. Flowers are arranged in axillary fascicles, up to 30 bunched together, and creamy or greenish in colour.

== Distribution and habitat ==
The geographical range of Strombosia grandifolia is the eastern parts of West Africa to Central Africa, from the Republic of Benin to the Democratic Republic of Congo. It is commonly found in evergreen forests in lowlands and also in transitional zones between lowland vegetation to afromontane vegetations.

== Uses ==
In traditional medicine, stem bark extracts are used in the treatments of various ailments that includes skin infections, abdominal pains and cough.
