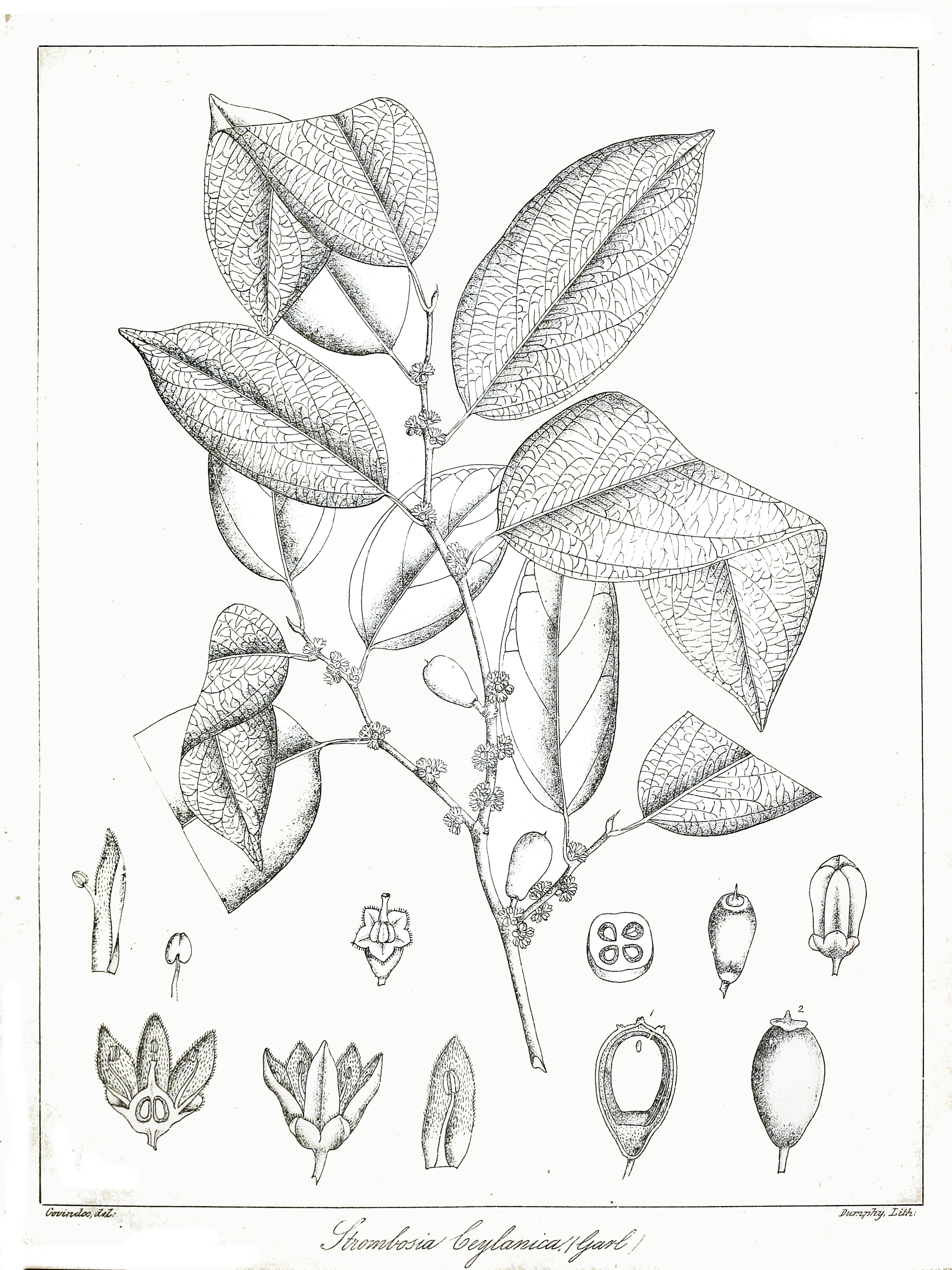
- Strombosia ceylanica

Scientific classification
- Kingdom: Plantae
- Clade: Tracheophytes
- Clade: Angiosperms
- Clade: Eudicots
- Order: Santalales
- Family: Olacaceae
- Genus: Strombosia; Blume

Species
- See text

= Strombosia =

Genus of plants

Strombosia is a plant genus of about 10 species in the family Olacaceae. It has also been classified in the family Strombosiaceae. The generic name is from the Greek strombos, meaning "pear-shaped", referring to the fruit.

== Description ==
Strombosia species grow as shrubs or trees. The flowers are bisexual with 5 petals. The fruits are drupes (pitted) with a thin, fleshy pericarp.

== Distribution and habitat ==
Strombosia species are distributed mostly in tropical Africa, with others in tropical Asia. Their habitat is typically lowland forests.

== Species ==
As of September 2021, Plants of the World Online recognised 11 species:

- Strombosia ceylanica Gardner
- Strombosia fleuryana Breteler
- Strombosia gossweileri S.Moore
- Strombosia grandifolia Hook.f. ex Benth.
- Strombosia nana Kosterm.
- Strombosia javanica Blume
- Strombosia nigropunctata Louis & J.Léonard
- Strombosia philippinensis S.Vidal
- Strombosia pustulata Oliv.
- Strombosia scheffleri Engl.
- Strombosia zenkeri Engl.
