= Daniellia klainei =

Conservation status
- Least Concern (IUCN 3.1)

Scientific classification
- Kingdom: Plantae
- Clade: Tracheophytes
- Clade: Angiosperms
- Clade: Eudicots
- Clade: Rosids
- Order: Fabales
- Family: Fabaceae
- Genus: Daniellia
- Species: D. klainei

Binomial name
- Daniellia klainei A.Chev.

Species of legume

Daniellia klainei is a species of plant in the family Fabaceae. It is found in Cameroon and Gabon.
