= Ngel Nyaki Forest Reserve =

- Majang Montane Forest Reserve (Nagombe, Joseph Titus (2018), "Ndola People and Region in African History", Legacy Perfect Digital Prints, Jalingo, Taraba State, Nigeria.
- Location within Nigeria
- Location: Nigeria
- Nearest city: Yelwa village
- Coordinates: 7°05′N 11°04′E
- Area: 46 km^{2} (18 sq mi)
- Established: 1969

The 'Ngel Nyaki Forest Reserve, whose site is historically known as Majang, is situated on the Mambilla Plateau in North East Nigeria, covering 46 km^{2}. It can be reached on foot from Yelwa village past the Mayo Jigawal, from where it is less than half an hour’s walk to the upper edge of the forest. The altitude ranges from 1,400 metres (4,593 ft) to 1,600 metres (5,249 ft). Ngel Nyaki was formally gazetted a local authority Forest Reserve under Gashaka - Mambilla Native Authority Forest order of April 1969, but presently it is under the management of the Taraba State Government and the Nigerian Conservation Foundation (NCF), with the Nigerian Montane Forest Project (NMFP) as a project partner.

In November 2014 a long term monitoring vegetation plot was established in the reserve, funded by Nigerian philanthropist Theophilus Danjuma and, administered by the Nigerian Montane Forest Project. The research plot is part of the Center for Tropical Forest Science (CTFS) global network operated through the Smithsonian Tropical Research Institute.

== Vegetation ==
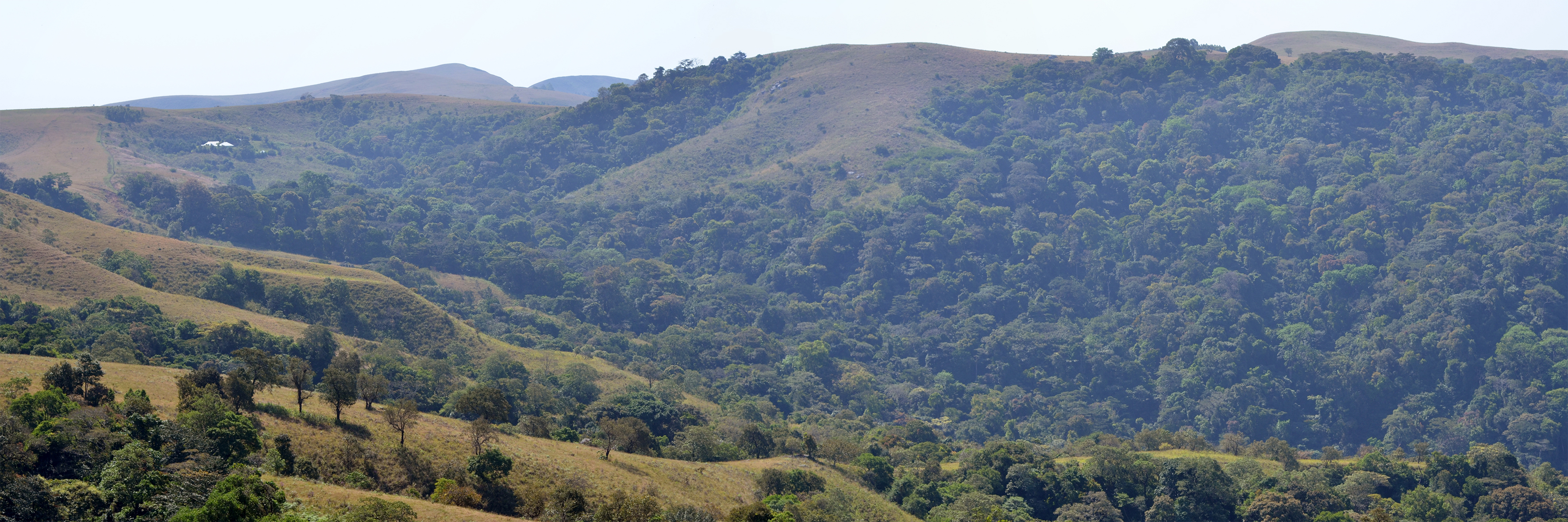
Panorama of the eastern edge of Ngel Nyaki Forest Reserve on the Mambilla Plateau, Taraba State, Nigeria

The reserve contains a stand of rare dry type montane to sub-montane forest, and is the only forest of its type left on the heavily populated Mambilla plateau. The forest is an isolated fragment of approximately 7.5 km^{2}. The forest is diverse in species composition, amongst the most floristically diverse montane–submontane forest stands in Nigeria, and has many tall emergents (e.g. Aningeria altissima, locally exclusive to this forest). Four tree species are Red Data listed (Entandrophragma angolense, Lovoa trichilioides, Millettia conraui, Aningeria altissima), and several, such as Anthonotha noldeae are new to West Africa and others new to Nigeria. An illustrated checklist of the flora of Ngel Nyaki Forest Reserve has been created.

== Fauna ==
Ngel Nyaki is home to a population of the rare and endangered Nigeria-Cameroon chimpanzee, Pan troglodytes subsp. ellioti. It is estimated that the chimpanzee population in the forest comprises a single interbreeding community of 11–13 adults.

Other primates including putty-nosed monkey (Cercopithecus nictitans), mona monkey (Cercopithecus mona) and tantalus monkey (Chlorocebus tantalus) also inhabit the forest. Birds such as turacos, the Cameroon olive-pigeon (Columba sjostedti), double-toothed barbet (Lybius bidentatus) and green bulbul are common.

Freshwater crayfish belonging to the genus Astacopsis are found abundantly in the forested streams.

Ngel Nyaki has been classified as an Important Bird Area by Birdlife International. Species of interest include the IUCN vulnerable Bannerman's weaver (Ploceus bannermani), and the near threatened Crossley's ground-thrush (Zoothera crossleyi). 158 bird species were recorded on the Mambilla Plateau between 13 November – 22 December 2003 by Tony Disley, many of them were within Ngel Nyaki Forest Reserve.
