= Mambila people =

Ethnic group in Cameroon and Nigeria

Mambila/Mambilla
Total population
- 400,000 (2015)

Regions with significant populations
- Mambilla Plateau
- Nigeria: 300,000
- Cameroon: 100,000

Languages
- Mambila, French, English, ( Fulfulde secondary language for trade)

Religion
- Traditional African religions, Islam, Christianity

The Mambilla or Mambila people of Nigeria live on the Mambilla Plateau (in 'Sardauna' local government area (formerly, Mambilla LGA) of Taraba State in Nigeria). A small fraction of Mambilla migrants left the Mambilla Plateau for the Ndòm Plain (also known as northern Tikar Plain) on the Cameroon side of the international border as well as in a couple of small villages, such as New Nàmba, on the Gashaka Plain in the north, and Jiini-Nyalang-Langa area close to the Kwanja. The Mambilla also occupy the Nyorrong-Lii-Ngùum area of Cameroon and are traceable in history to the Bang District of Mambilla Plateau. Today, the preferred ethnonym is spelt Mambila in Cameroon and Mambilla in Nigeria. "Norr" is also used (the word for person in Nigerian dialects of Mambilla) (Bami-Yuno, 2013 ms).

== Identification ==
The Mambilla people of Nigeria (with a small fraction in Cameroon) regard themselves as a group with a common identity. They are the denizens of the Mambilla Region, and have been in their homeland for about 5,000 years. In Nigerian dialects they refer to themselves as 'Norr' (the people) while in Cameroon there is a collective noun 'Ba' that is used in the unmarked sense to refer to the Mambilla, and also to refer to Mambilla in Cameroon on the Ndom or northern Tikar plain (see below) contrastively with neighbouring Mambilla on the highlands of the Mambilla plateau who can be referred to as "Bo ba bo", meaning "the Ba people". The populations of different Mambilla villages speak different dialects of Mambilla or closely related Mambiloid languages. They also share a set of closely related cultural practices, in particular a conjunction of masquerade and oath-taking called "Suu", "Shua", "Sua" or "Shuaga". In the Somie (Ndeba) dialect this is phonetically written as [ʃwaɣa]. See discussion in "Sua in Somie" cited below. A locally written French language historical source for Somie history is Zeitlyn Mial & Mbe 2000.

The Mambila or Mambilla language is a congeries of dialects and related languages. The SIL Ethnologue database gives two codes MCU for the Cameroonian dialects and MZK for the Nigerian dialects. Glottolog gives a different classifcation that does not involve the international border. See the survey work of Bruce Connell on the VIMS website cited below, and the article on Mambiloid languages. The Common Mambilla or Tungbo Dialect is the most widely understood Mambilla dialect in Nigeria. It is also the literary language of Mambilla for the vast majority who inhabit the Mambilla Plateau. The Mambilla New Testament known as 'Li Fa' and several Mambilla Language study texts are written in the Common Mambilla Dialect for Nigeria. A New Testament in Ju Ba is also available for speakers of Mambilla dialects on the Cameroon side of the border based on the Songkolong dialect.

== Location ==
Most Mambilla live on the Mambilla plateau with their modern capital at Bommi (Gembu in "Sardauna" Local Government). 6.713833°N 11.25002°E in Taraba State of Nigeria [Note that the traditional and historical name of this local government area has been "Mambilla", and that the "Sardauna" misnomer is a modern imposition by external or non-indigenous peoples, particularly, in conjunction with the defunct Jega Government of 1984]. This is a highland plateau, the northerly continuation of the Bamenda grassfields. The plateau is dissected by many rivers (notably the River Donga) leaving a complex geography of steep valleys separated by highlands (all of similar altitude). The Gang Peak, located in the northeastern corner of the Mambilla Plateau, on the Mambilla-Gashaka-Cameroon tri-point boundary zone, is Nigeria's loftiest landform. Villages are found both on the hilltops and on valley bottoms, and are relatively isolated from one another particularly during the rainy seasons when river crossings can be difficult (and impossible for motorised transport). Agriculture is concentrated on the valley bottoms while the highlands have been extensively grazed since the 1940s, i.e. since the immigration of cattle graziers towards the end of British administration (it was part of British Cameroon until the referendum of 1959/61). There has been overgrazing and erosion has caused considerable problems from the late 1970s onwards.

A smaller fraction of the Mambilla, migrants from Nyö or Mvũrr in southern Mambilla Plateau and other villages, are to be found on the edge of the Ndòm (northern Tikar) Plain in Cameroon at the foot of the escarpment of the Mambilla Plateau. The principal Cameroonian villages are Mbèrr/ Mbòr (Sonkolong), Taga (Atta) and Ndiba (Somié). This is an area which, beginning from about A.D 1700, they, in a piece-meal fashion, progressively captured from the Twumwu, a pre-Tikar group that inhabited the Ndom Plain (Zeitlyn & Connell, 2003). At an altitude of some 700 m, these Ndòm villages live in a different ecological zone from those of the Plateau: for example, oil palm plantations and gallery forest are found there. The toponym Ndòm itself on this plain is a transplanted replica of the old Ndòm at Nyö Heights on the Mambilla Plateau. Mbèrr (the correct name of "Shonkolong") was similarly taken from the original "Mbèrr" at Gwalì area of the Nyö Heights, from which the current Mbèrr on Ndòm Plain and the Mbèrrbà around Kwanja emanated.

== Art ==
The Mambila Plateau lies north of the grasslands. The inhabitants developed unique art styles of sculpture made of clay, terracotta, pith, and wood. Wood carving is done primarily by men, yet there is no one specific specialist. Tools are a creation of the carver themselves, creating tools as needed. Things like chisels, curved knives, straight knives are made by the sculptor. Using these handmade tools leaves room for error and never leaves and entirely smooth surface. Sculptures with heart shaped faces symbolize the earliest artistic endeavors, while current mask display stylizations of birds, beasts, and humans. A majority of Mambila figures in the Mambila Plateau were taken by art traders in the 1960s and 1970s, leaving very few figures and sculptures to be documented. The most documented figures of the Mambila culture are Tadep and Kike figures.

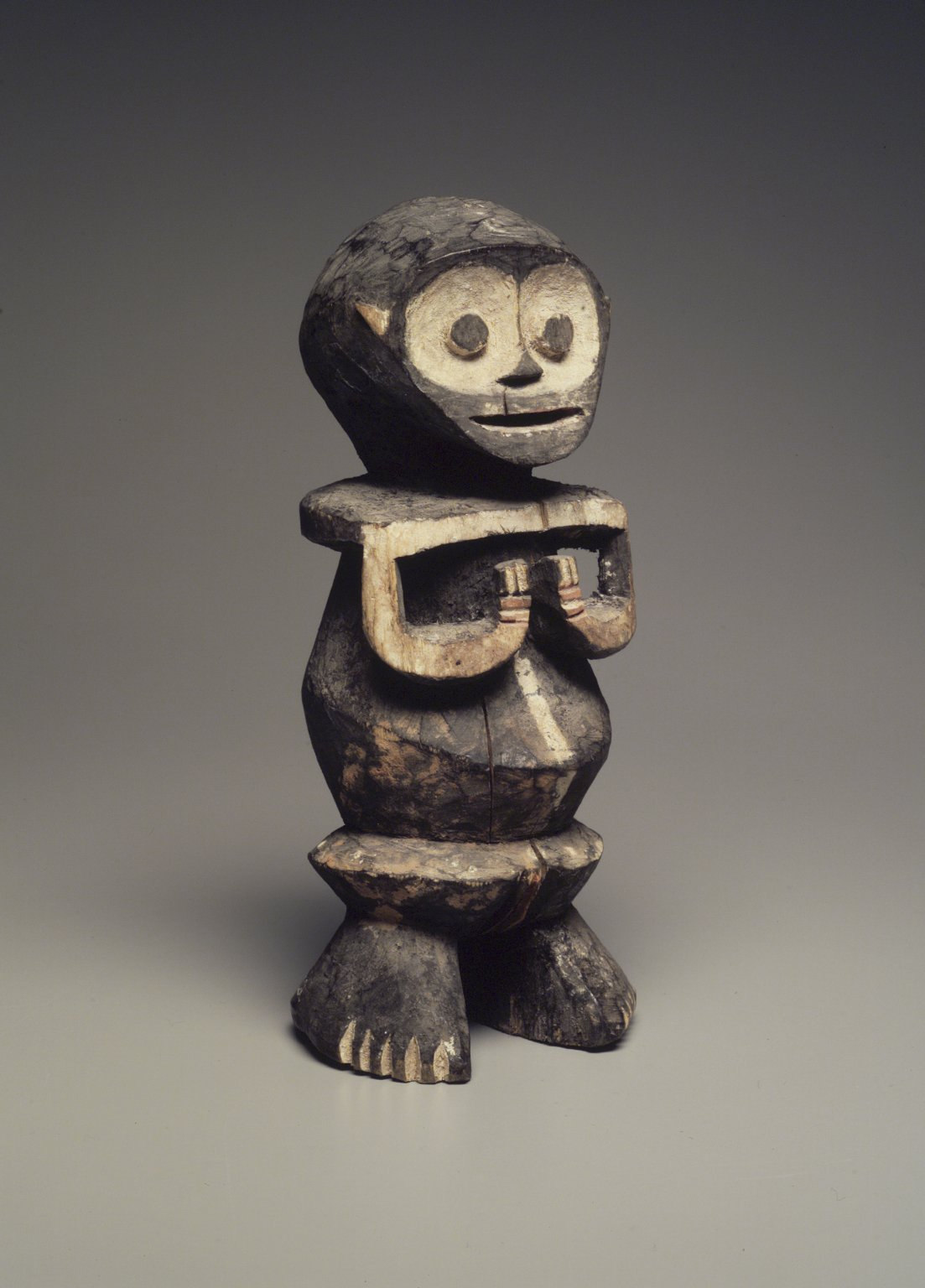
Male Tadep Guardian Figure, Brooklyn Museum

=== Figures ===
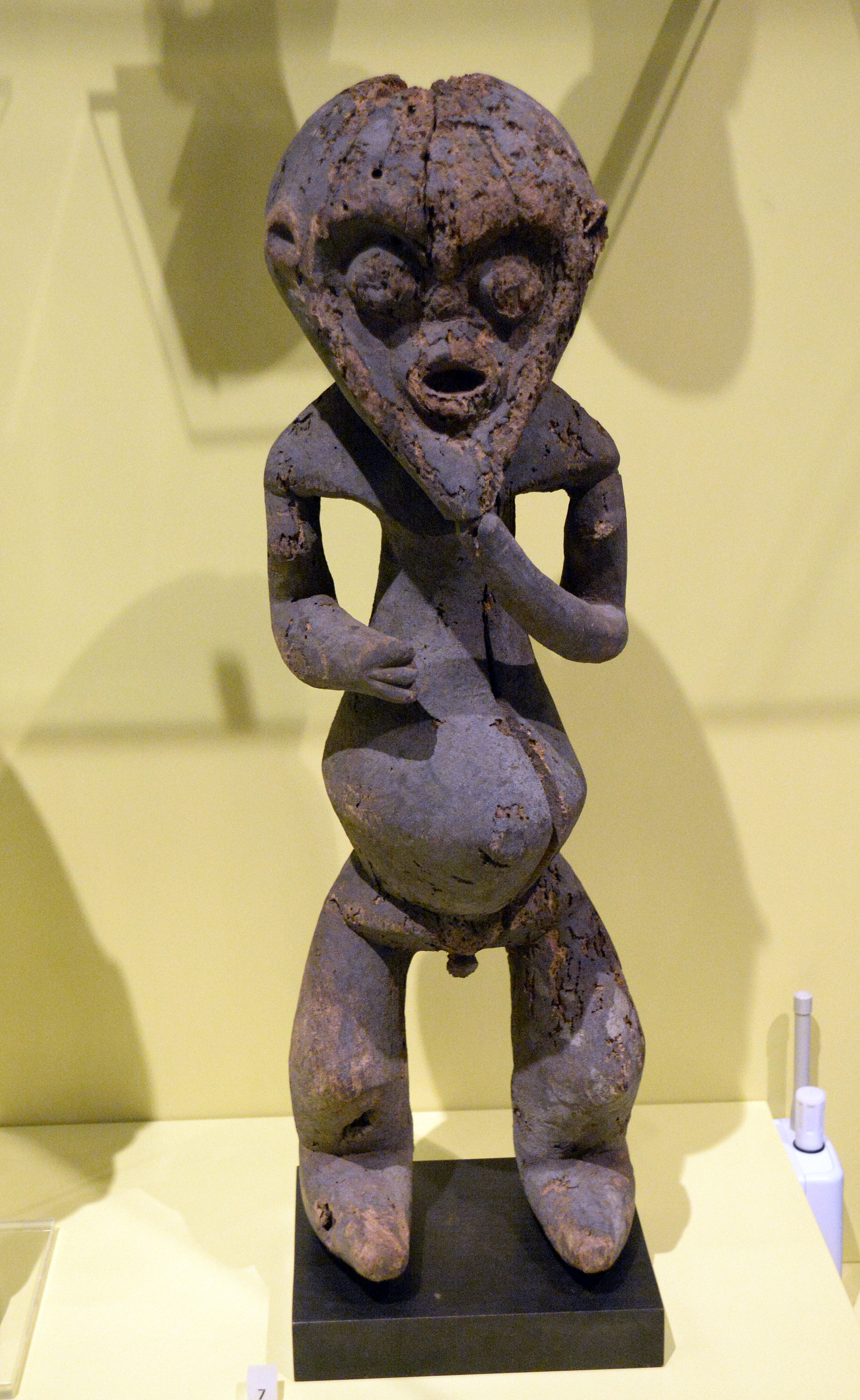
Male Tadep figure, Mambila People, Cameroon, early 19th century CE. Tadep figures were used in male-female pairs. National Museum of Scotland, Edinburgh

Tadep depict male and female pairs usually carved from low density wood. They can also depict singular figures of multiples of one sex. Kike (Táké) are figures carved and made from the pith of raffia palm. and are larger statue type figures. These figures would often be placed inside of granaries, while other statues are displayed on the outside as well. These objects were sacra of associations related to illness and healing. Tadep and Kike were part of the Suu or Suaga association.

There are several eccentricities that set their art apart from other cultures. Mambila figures made of soft pith, and the attachment to shrines and sacred enclosures are something that only certain sexes are allowed to see. The pith figures were to act as embodiments of visiting ancestral spirits. Ancestral spirits guarded family treasures located within shrines by embodying these figurines. Another distinction is the annual application of their color scheme of red, white, and black to functioning objects. The male figure had a small opening in the abdomen as a receptacle for food particles, while the female figure had a blocked off abdomen opening.

=== Festivals ===
The festivals celebrated in Mambilla include the Bol (November), Literr (February), Toshin (January–February), Mbà Sùu (April–June), Tírrìm (September), and Kàtìi (December). They are known by other nomenclatures in the Ndòm Plain (northern Tikar lowlands). For instance, Bol has an alternative name of "Lùm", which, though known, is less widely used on the Plateau except at Nyo, Mvua and other eastern villages. Gùbírr is celebrated in September too and begins at Dieb (Dembe).

Men travel from village to village for festivities which include dance, sports, and form friendships that promote inter-village relations. Masks appear at Mbâ Sùu and can only be seen by men. There are many awe-instilling Sùu figures. The "Sùuburr" or "Sua Burr" is a Sùu of the first rank, typically like a helmet and worn over the head, resting on the wearers shoulders. It is always accompanied by a number of second rank masks like the "Suu Dua" or "Sua Dua", which rest on top of the head. Almost all masks and art figures are kept from women as they are not allowed to see them, or be any part of them. NB: the above description represent external analysis by foreign collectors. Much detail is excluded and local content is largely excluded in line with traditional norms.

== Farmer Grazers disputes ==
In late 2000, and thereafter, particularly on 1 January 2002 when Udawa Fulani mercenaries from Niger and Chad invaded the Mambilla Plateau, conflicts over land led to many Fulani herders being driven from the Mambilla Plateau and becoming refugees in Cameroon and other parts of Nigeria. (There were confirmed newspaper and official reports of Fulani mercenaries being brought into Mambilla). Similar troubles occurred on 17 June 2017 when a Community Leader was abducted at about 3am in a Gestapo-style operation of the now-disbanded SARS Police brought in by certain actors. Again on 1 March 2018, the shooting to death of 2 men in a farm sparked off another round of conflict, that ended with fulani herders being pushed back once again. This conflict is based on the intent to displace the indigenous people.

== Climate ==
Being the highest point in West Africa, the Mambilla Plateau is the coldest area in Nigeria. The climate is generally temperate throughout the year. There is a dry season from late November until early March, the rains (which are abundant and regular) peaking in August - September before gradually reducing in intensity. Showers and isolated heavy rains are rarely experienced between December and February On the Mambilla Plateau the altitude is sufficient for evenings to be cool. Daytime temperatures hardly exceed 25 °C (77.0 °F) making it the coldest plateau in Nigeria.
