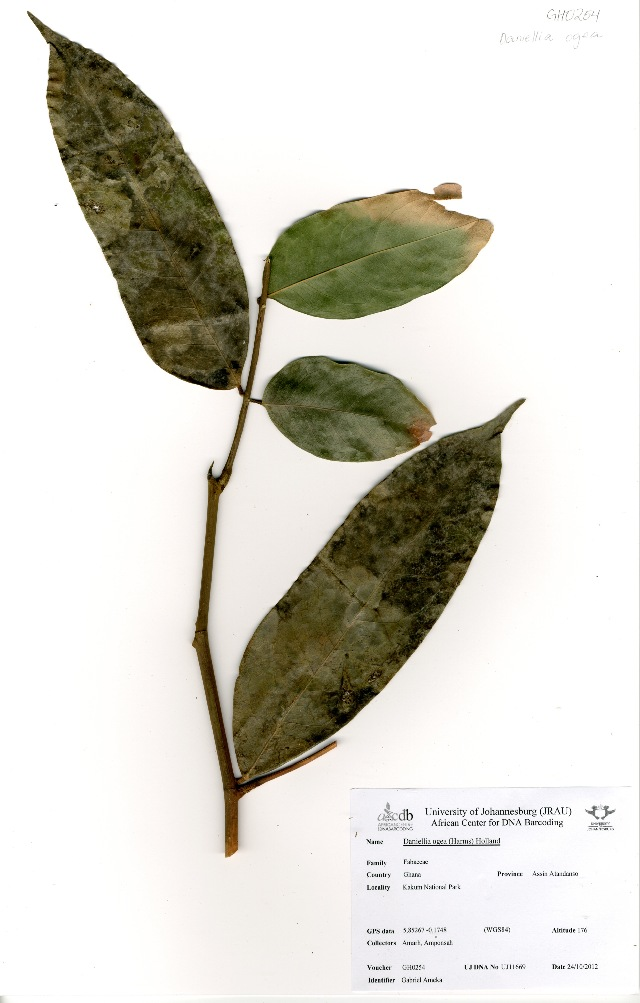
- Daniellia ogea

Scientific classification
- Kingdom: Plantae
- Clade: Tracheophytes
- Clade: Angiosperms
- Clade: Eudicots
- Clade: Rosids
- Order: Fabales
- Family: Fabaceae
- Subfamily: Detarioideae
- Tribe: Detarieae
- Genus: Daniellia; Benn. (1855)

Synonyms
- Cyanothyrsus Harms (1897); Paradaniellia Rolfe (1912)

= Daniellia =

Genus of legumes

Daniellia is a genus of plants in the family Fabaceae, named after William Freeman Daniell. It includes ten species native to sub-Saharan Africa, ranging from Senegal to Sudan and south to Zambia and Angola.

It contains the following species:

- Daniellia alsteeniana P.A.Duvign.
- Daniellia glandulosa Estrella
- Daniellia klainei Pierre ex A.Chev.
- Daniellia oblonga Oliv.
- Daniellia ogea (Harms) Rolfe ex Holland
- Daniellia oliveri (Rolfe) Hutch. & Dalziel
- Daniellia pilosa (J.Léonard) Estrella
- Daniellia pynaertii De Wild.
- Daniellia soyauxii (Harms) Rolfe
- Daniellia thurifera Benn.
