= Omo Forest Reserve =

Forest reserve in Nigeria

- Location within Nigeria
- Location: Ogun, Nigeria
- Nearest city: Ijebu Ode
- Coordinates: 06°51′00″N 04°22′48″E
- Area: 130,500 hectares (322,000 acres)

Omo Forest Reserve is a preserved area of tropical rainforest in Ogun state, in the south-western part of Nigeria. It is located about 135 km (84 mi) northeast of Lagos and 80 km (50 mi) east of Ijebu Ode. This nature reserve covers an area of 130,500 hectares (322,000 acres). The average rainfall is around 2,000 mm (80 in). The terrain is largely flat and well-drained, with some low rolling hills, and forms part of the Omo River Watershed.

== History ==
The Omo Forest Reserve was established in 1925 and was constituted during the British colonial era. It was initially set-up for conservation of timber resources for commercial exploitation, but afterwards the reserve's focus shifted towards the conservation of biodiversity and protection of endangered species, which made the area more ecologically valuable and it became more important and widely recognized.

== Geography ==
Omo Forest Reserve is located in the Ijebu East local government area of Ogun State, Nigeria. It is situated within the rainforest zone of south western Nigeria. It shares borders with other forest reserve like Shasha and Oluwa. The reserve covers a vast area of 1,305 square kilometers, making it one of the largest forests in Nigeria.

== Description ==
This forest reserve consists of a large area of tropical rainforest covering 130,500 hectares (322,000 acres). In the northern part of the reserve, the vegetation consists of a dry evergreen mixed deciduous forest, while in the south, it consists of a moist, mixed, semi-deciduous forest. Parts of the reserve consist of primary forest with mature trees, especially near the watercourses. However, large portions have been disturbed, with the felling of the original trees and the establishment of plantations. At the centre of the reserve, a plot of 640 hectares (1,600 acres) has been designated a strict nature reserve, and this portion is now a UNESCO Biosphere Reserve.

== Biodiversity ==
Over two hundred species of tree have been recorded in the reserve, the most common trees being Diospyros spp., Drypetes spp., Strombosia pustulata, Rinorea dentata and Voacanga africana, and the most common plant families include Araceae, Asteraceae, Ebenaceae, Faboideae, Liliaceae, Poaceae, Rubiaceae and Violaceae. Also recorded in the reserve are 125 species of bird, and among a number of mammals present are such endangered species as chimpanzees, elephants and the white-throated guenon monkey.

== Conservation ==
The reserve is subject to poaching, illegal timber extraction, and uncontrolled agricultural activities. The Nigerian Forest Elephant Group is a conservation charity, established in 1989, that aims to educate the local community about the benefits of conservation and to protect the forest environment.
