= Rinorea dentata =

Scientific classification
- Kingdom: Plantae
- Clade: Tracheophytes
- Clade: Angiosperms
- Clade: Eudicots
- Clade: Rosids
- Order: Malpighiales
- Family: Violaceae
- Genus: Rinorea
- Species: R. dentata

Binomial name
- Rinorea dentata (P. Beauv.)

Species of flowering plant

Rinorea dentata, commonly known as kuntze, is a species of plant in the family Violaceae. It is found in the tropical rainforests of Liberia, Nigeria, Cameroon and Uganda. It is particularly common in the Omo Forest Reserve in Ogun State, Nigeria.

== Description ==
Rinorea dentata is a large shrub or small tree growing up to 10 m (33 ft) high. It is an understorey tree growing in dense, shady locations in forests. The trunk is very hard, earning the plant the name “Oloboroho” (stone plant) in the Yoruba language.

== Uses ==
The wood of this plant is used as a chewing stick for oral hygiene, and extracts have been used for anti-microbial and anti-malaria purposes as a folk remedy in humans, and as a veterinary remedy for aiding parturition in livestock. Researchers found that the plant contained novel cyclotides, but further research is needed on the efficacy of these extracts.
