= Gashaka Gumti National Park =

National park in Nigeria

- IUCN category II (national park)
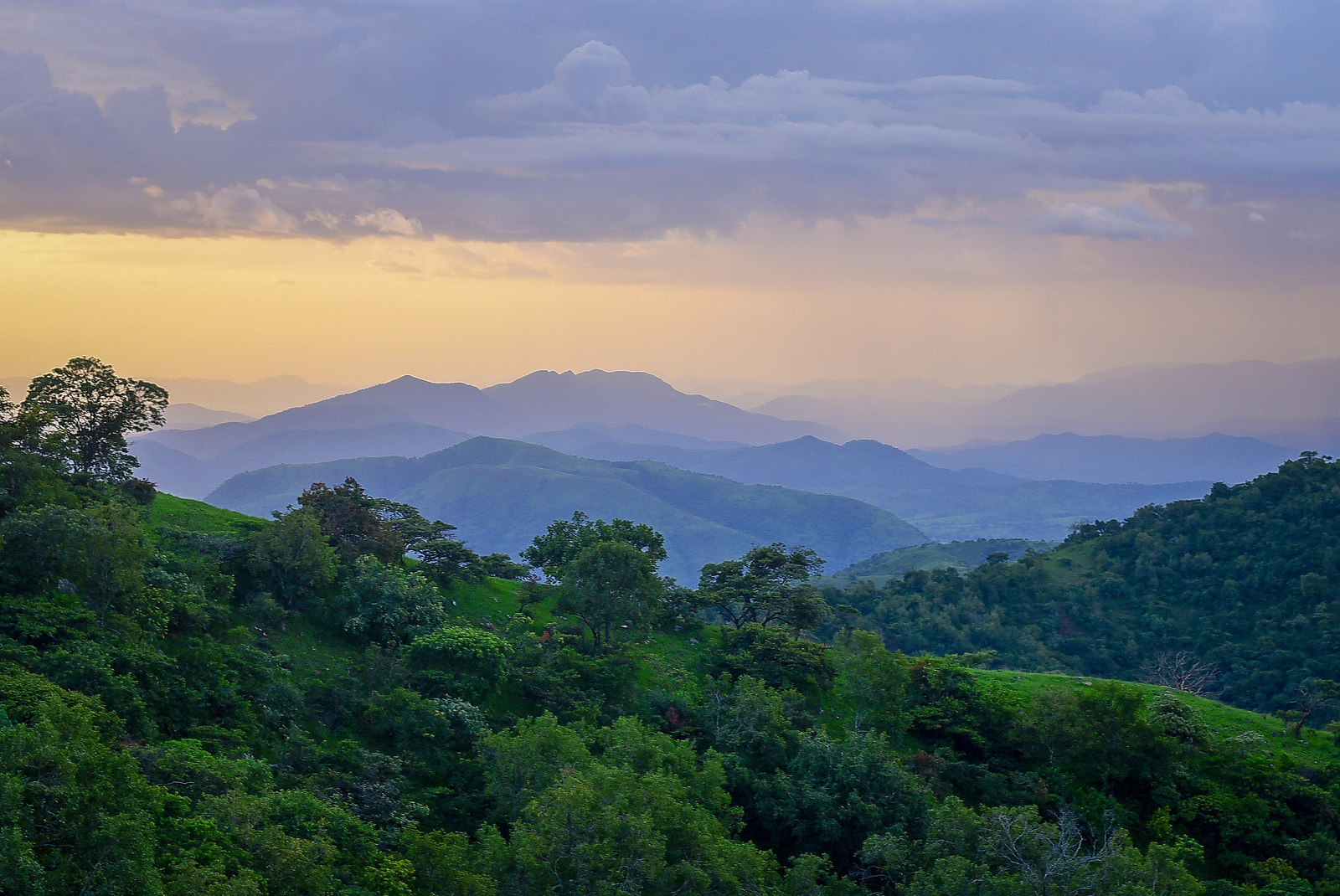

- Location within Nigeria
- Location: Nigeria
- Coordinates: 07°21′00″N 11°31′12″E
- Area: 6,402 km^{2} (2,472 sq mi)
- Established: 1991

Gashaka-Gumti National Park (GGNP) is a national park in Nigeria. It was gazetted from two game reserves in 1991 and is Nigeria's largest national park. It is located in the eastern provinces of Taraba and Adamawa to the border with Cameroon. The total area covers about 6,402 km^{2}, much of the northern GGNP is savannah grassland, while the southern GGNP sector of the park has a rugged terrain characterised by very mountainous, steep slopes as well as deep valleys and gorges, and is home to montane forests. Altitude ranges from about 457 metres (1,499 ft) in the northern flatter corner of the park, up to 2,419 metres (7,936 ft) at Chappal Waddi, Nigeria's highest mountain in the park's southern sections. It is an important water catchment area for the Benue River. There is abundant river flow even during the markedly dry season. Enclaves for local Fulani pastoralists exist within the park boundary that allow for farming and grazing.

== Park creation ==
The Gashaka Gumti region faced rampant hunting, putting immense pressure on its rich biodiversity. Recognizing the escalating threat, the Government of Northern Nigeria commissioned a land systems survey in 1966. This study, conducted by Mike Bawden and Paul Tuley, highlighted the urgent need to protect the watersheds of the forested mountains that supplied the River Taraba.

In 1969, a wildlife expert from the Food and Agriculture Organization (FAO) of the United Nations recommended the creation of a game reserve or national park to safeguard local wildlife resources. These reports coincided with a period when Nigeria, having recently gained independence, prioritised the management of its natural resources, allocating significant financial resources to conservation programs.

In 1972, the Government of the North-East State collaborated with local governments and traditional chiefs of Ganye and Gashaka Gumti divisions to establish three game sanctuaries—Serti, Gashaka, and Gumti. The ban on hunting within these sanctuaries marked a crucial step towards conservation.

As Nigeria's economy faltered in the early 1980s, budgets for conservation initiatives, including Gashaka Gumti, were slashed. Neglect ensued, affecting infrastructure, patrolling, and overall park management. The park faced a catastrophe in 1983–84 with the outbreak of pan-African rinderpest, leading to the decimation of ungulates and a surge in poaching.

In the late 1980s, the Department for International Development (DFID) extended a lifeline to the park, injecting funds for critical projects. Simultaneously, the Nigerian Conservation Foundation (NCF) proposed to the Federal Government that Gashaka Gumti be designated a national park. Eleven main reasons were identified, ranging from the protection of watersheds to the development of ecotourism.

In 1991, Gashaka Gumti National Park was designated under new legislation. Managed by the NCF in partnership with the Gongola State Government's Wildlife Unit, the project aimed to address various conservation challenges. Faith Ananze, an experienced manager, led the initiative, assembling a dedicated team of workers to embark on the revitalization of the park.

== Fauna ==
The fauna of the national park is very diverse. 103 species of mammals have been recorded at censuses. Species include yellow-backed duiker, African golden cat (Caracal aurata), The African buffalo, the largest population in Nigeria of chimpanzee (Pan troglodytes) is found within the boundaries of the national park. To protect the animals and the ecosystem, the Gashaka Primate Project was launched. Living in the national park are also African bush elephants (Loxodonta africana), klipspringers (Oreotragus oreotragus), giant forest hogs (Hylochoerus meinertzhageni), hartebeests (Alcelaphus buselaphus), giant elands (Taurotragus derbianus), roan antelope (Hippotragus equinus), kob (Kobus kob), oribi (Ourebia ourebi), and the rare mountain reedbuck (Redunca fulvorufula) in larger stocks. Predators such as lions (Panthera leo), leopards (Panthera pardus) and African wild dogs (Lycaon pictus manguensis) can also be found in the park.

The avian fauna is very rich and diverse, there are stocks are up 1 million birds estimated. The park is officially labelled as one of Africa's "Important Bird Areas" - and with more than 500 species found, and visiting bird watching enthusiasts are constantly adding new species to the list. The red-faced lovebird is only found here and in the Central African Republic's Bamingui-Bangoran National Park and Biosphere Reserve.

== Flora ==
In November 2002 an isolated population of the red sunbird bush, an ornate species of the acanthus family, was discovered in the 8 km^{2} Leinde Fadale forest in the uplands adjacent to the park. The species occurs here at 1,600 to 1,670 m.a.s.l., and some 1,200 km from the nearest populations in the Afromontane archipelago. It has been suggested that the park boundary should be extended to protect the forest. There are various tree species in the park with different tree species growing in different sectors of the park. At Northern Gumti sector, there are tall trees such as Acacia spp, Afzelia africana, Khaya senegalensis, Daniellia oliveri, Isoberlinia doka and Vitellaria paradoxa. At the Gashaka, which is the Southern part of the park, vegetation is closely related to the Southern Guinea Savanna. The dominant tree species in the area include Triplochiton scleroxylon, Aubrevillea kerstingii, Symphonia globulifera and Mallettia spp.

== Climate ==
The Gashaka Gumti National Park, situated in a local steppe climate, is characterised by minimal precipitation throughout the year. The Köppen-Geiger classification categorizes its prevailing climate as BSh. Its proximity to the equator makes it challenging to distinctly delineate seasons, with January, February, June, July, August, September, October, November, and December being widely considered as the peak season for visitation.

Statistical analysis places the average annual temperature at approximately 26.4 °C or 79.5 °F. The temperature variation throughout the year exhibits a range of 7.4 °C or 13.4 °F. The minimum temperature occurs in January at 16.1 °C or 61 °F, while the maximum is recorded in April and May at 38 °C or 100.3 °F. The monthly temperature averages, displayed in the table, offer insight into the seasonal variations.

Annual precipitation in the national park amounts to 672 millimetres or 26.5 inches. The difference in precipitation between the driest (January) and wettest (August) months is notable, reaching 200 milimetres or 8 inches. Rainfall is generally scarce, with January experiencing virtually no precipitation. Conversely, August is the wettest month with 130 milimetres or 5 inches of rainfall.

Relative humidity fluctuates across the months, with August exhibiting the highest at 84%, while March records the lowest at 13%. August also sees the highest number of rainy days (14) compared to January, which experiences virtually none. This indicates a distinct wet season during August.

Gashaka Gumti National Park experiences varying daily sunshine hours throughout the year. On average, April records the highest daily sunshine hours at approximately 10.93, accumulating to a total of 338.77 hours.

Climate data for Gashaka
Month	Jan	Feb	Mar	Apr	May	Jun	Jul	Aug	Sep	Oct	Nov	Dec	Year
Mean daily maximum °C (°F)	32.1 (89.8)	35.3 (95.5)	37.9 (100.3)	38.0 (100.4)	35.2 (95.4)	32.1 (89.8)	29.1 (84.3)	27.3 (81.2)	28.5 (83.3)	30.6 (87.1)	32.9 (91.3)	31.8 (89.3)	32.6 (90.6)
Daily mean °C (°F)	23.9 (75.1)	27.0 (80.6)	30.1 (86.1)	31.2 (88.1)	29 (85)	27.2 (80.9)	25 (77)	23.7 (74.7)	24.3 (75.7)	25.3 (77.6)	25.6 (78.1)	23.9 (75.1)	26.4 (79.5)
Mean daily minimum °C (°F)	16 (61)	19.1 (66.3)	21.9 (71.5)	24.3 (75.8)	24.2 (75.6)	23.0 (73.4)	21.6 (70.9)	20.8 (69.5)	20.8 (69.5)	20.7 (69.2)	18.6 (65.4)	17 (62)	20.7 (69.2)
Average precipitation cm (inches)	0 (0)	0 (0)	0 (0)	0 (0)	5.1 (2)	5.1 (2)	13 (5)	18 (7)	13 (5)	5.1 (2)	0 (0)	0 (0)	59.3 (23)
Average rainy days	0	0	0	3	8	10	14	18	16	8	0	0	77
Average relative humidity (%)	21	15	13	27	50	66	77	84	83	69	34	25	47
Mean daily sunshine hours	10.4	10.6	10.9	11.1	10.9	9.9	7.6	6.1	7.5	9.7	10.5	10.4	9.6
Source: climate-data.org

== Tourism ==
Tourism Statistics for the Gashaka Gumti National Park
S/No	Year	No. of domestic tourists (Local)	No. of international tourists (Foreign)
1	2005	166	55
2	2006	80	61
3	2007	282	44
4	2008	90	53
5	2009	276	71
6	2010	1643	88
7	2011	932	92
8	2012	1028	50
9	2013	992	61
10	2014	804	12
11	2015	420	25
12	Total	6,713	612

The table above provides insight into the visitation patterns at Gashaka Gumti National Park from 2005 to 2015. While the total number of visitors during this period was 7,325, the park experienced a notable decline in tourism after 2012. This drop is attributed to insecurity threats in the northeastern part of the country, primarily caused by insurgent activities and conflicts between cattle rearers and crop farmers in the region. Despite this decline, the park continues to attract international tourists, with scholars from Britain comprising a significant portion.

The table below shows tourism revenue at the national park, which breaks down the revenue sources from 2005 to 2015. The park generated approximately ₦44 million ($144,000) during this period, with accommodation facilities and compensation emerging as the primary revenue contributors.

Revenue from Tourism Activities
Year	Catering/Bar (₦)	Accommodation (₦)	Compensation (₦)	Park Entering (₦)	Other Sources (₦)	Total (₦)
2005	69,800	984,050	84,100	108,500	5,200.00	1,251,650
2006	174,340	951,675.60	693,850	257,576.25	280,251.7	2,357,693.55
2007	9,000	242,502.75	323,140.00	173,150.00	302,971	1,050,763.75
2008	565,000	576,220	92,000	91,500	85,940	1,410,660
2009	484,720	1,115,475.00	1,484,000.00	47,729.75	197,480.	3,329,404.75
2010	79,909	1,707,800	867,700	224,410	230,040	3,109,859
2011	548,62.2	1,020,174	2,361,360	1,182,260	399,090	5,017,462
2012	216,75.9	1,679,150	2,416,813.8	423,170	3,213,411.4	7,754,221.1
2013	225,955	1,475,650	6,453,060	694,800	309,060	9,158,525
2014	220,065	888,500	3,984.00	1,113,412	5,955,227	8,181,188
Total (₦)	1,905,327.1	10,641,197.35	14,776,0238	4,061,508	10,978,670.7	42,781,427.15

A critical aspect of tourism is its role in providing employment opportunities. Gashaka Gumti National Park, during the study period, employed 269 full-time and 8 casual staff, contributing to both direct and indirect employment. The workforce comprised a mix of 150 indigenes and 119 non-indigenes.

Gashaka Gumti National Park boasts a rich tapestry of ecotourism resources, making it a captivating destination for nature enthusiasts. Some key attractions include:

- The Hippo Pool: Offering a close encounter with hippos in their natural habitat. The German Fort: A historic site with ruins of a pre-colonial German fort.
- GGNP Museum: Showcasing natural history specimens, fishing gear, and hunting equipment.
- Game Trail: Allowing visitors to witness diverse fauna, including chimpanzees, leopards, and various antelope species.
- Primate Watching: Highlighting the park's importance as a stronghold for primates like chimpanzees and baboons.
- Bird Watch: GGNP, classified as an Important Bird Area, hosts over 500 bird species, making it a paradise for birdwatchers.
- The Mayo Kam River: The largest river in the park, teeming with fish and wildlife during the dry season.
- Kiri Waterfall: A majestic waterfall in the northern sector, attracting visitors with its natural beauty.
- Mountaineering: GGNP offers challenging highlands and ranges for mountaineering and cave exploration.
- Safari and Nature Walk: Allowing visitors to explore the vast park, creating lasting memories.
- Well Paved Trail Tracks: Guided trails through rugged terrains, accompanied by fascinating tales from knowledgeable guides.
- Sport Fishing: Ideal spots for fishing in the Mayo Kam River during the dry season.
- Outdoor Camping: Designated camping areas for those seeking a rustic experience.
- Hot Spring: Natural hot springs near Gashaka village, adding to the park's allure.

The park management has made efforts to enhance visitor experiences by providing facilities such as accommodation, conference centers, and viewing vehicles. With a variety of lodging options, including suites, luxury rooms, and VIP accommodations, GGNP aims to cater to diverse preferences. Additionally, the park has well-trained guides to assist visitors in exploring its wonders.

== Conflicts ==
Gashaka Gumti National Park has faced significant challenges and conflicts, particularly stemming from illegal logging activities. These conflicts have resulted in the loss of lives among the park's Rangers and posed a serious threat to the conservation efforts in the region.

According to a 2019 report, illegal loggers have been responsible for the deaths of at least nine Rangers, with several others sustaining injuries over the past few years. The Conservator of the Park, Alhaji Mohammed Kabir, revealed that the deceased Rangers include Usman Yahya, Joshua Mamman, Adamu Hamman, Ajayi Peter, Hamman Njidda, Hamman Dikko, Zamani Teituly, Sunday Ali, and Yakubu Umaru. These tragic incidents are directly linked to the activities of loggers and the insecurity surrounding the park and its support zone communities.

The conflicts have primarily arisen due to the increased desperation for illegal logging of Rosewood (pterocarpus erinaceous), locally known as Madrid. The economic importance and abundance of this species were discovered between 2014 and 2015 in Gashaka Local Government Area (LGA) and around the national park, creating a serious security threat to the park's workers.

The Conservator, Alhaji Mohammed Kabir, highlighted the challenges faced by the park, including illegal logging, illegal grazing, high-level insecurity, poaching, and various other illegal human activities. The discovery of Rosewood in the region has led to sleepless nights for park managers and Rangers as they strive to protect the forest resources from desperate loggers.

Traditional leaders, such as the Lamdo Gashaka, Dr Zubairu Hammangabdo, emphasized the collective responsibility of conserving the national park. They pledged to mobilize their subjects to protect what is described as "the largest and most diverse conservation enclave in Nigeria". The leaders warned against illegal logging and poaching, stressing that the park is not only a pride for the people of Gashaka but for the entire Taraba State and Nigeria.

Efforts to address these conflicts involve commemorating World Rangers Day on the 31st of July each year, as designated by the International Ranger Federation (IRF). This day serves to honor the selfless service rendered by Rangers who have been killed or injured in the line of duty, highlighting the critical work they do in protecting the natural resources of the Gashaka Gumti National Park.

== Human animal conflict in Gashaka Gumti National Park ==
Human animal conflict is rampact in all settlements where man and animals share the same environment or where conservation areas share boundaries with human settlement. In the Gashaka Gumti Park, the communities in the environment experience the same conflict. There are about 25 communities residing in the immediate surroundings of the park.
