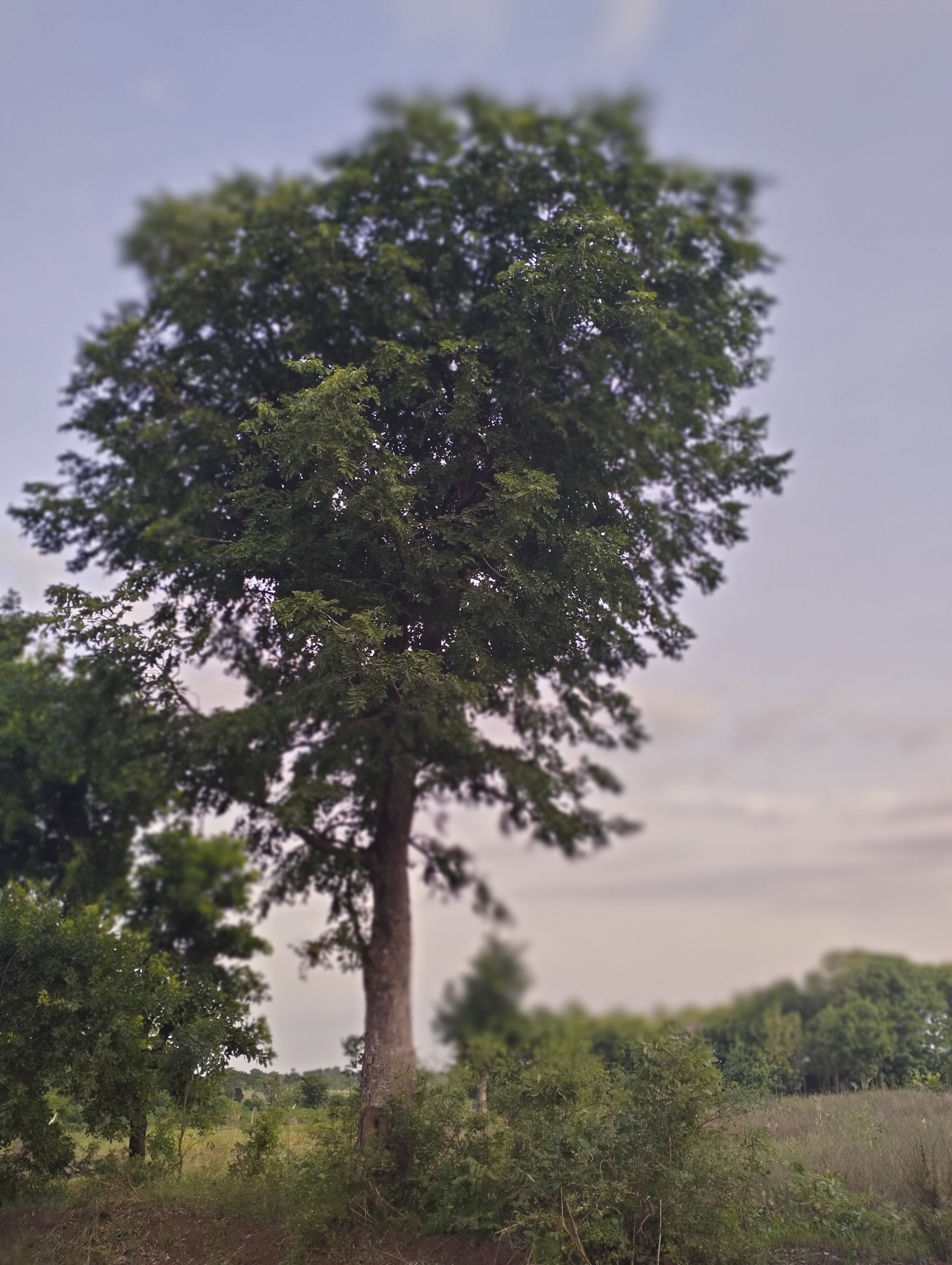

Scientific classification
- Kingdom: Plantae
- Clade: Tracheophytes
- Clade: Angiosperms
- Clade: Eudicots
- Clade: Rosids
- Order: Fabales
- Family: Fabaceae
- Genus: Daniellia
- Species: D. oliveri

Binomial name
- Daniellia oliveri (Rolfe) Hutch. & Dalziel

= Daniellia oliveri =

Species of tree, the African copaiba balsam tree

Daniellia oliveri is a species of tree in the family Fabaceae. It is native to tropical West and Central Africa and is commonly known as the African copaiba balsam tree, or the West African copal tree.

== Description ==
Daniellia oliveri is a medium-sized, deciduous tree growing to a height of 25 m (80 ft) or more. It has a sometimes twisted trunk up to 200 cm (80 in) in diameter, and a broad, flat-topped crown, and usually lacks branches on the lowest 9 m (30 ft) of trunk. The bark is greyish-white, smooth at first but later flaking off in patches. The alternate leaves are pinnate, up to 15 cm (6 in) long, with six to eleven pairs of leaflets and no terminal leaflet. The inflorescence is a compound raceme, the individual scented bisexual flowers having five, unequal creamy-white petals. These are followed by flattened oblong pods each containing one seed.

== Distribution and habitat ==
Daniellia oliveri is found in tropical West and Central Africa, its range extending from Senegal to Sudan, Uganda and the Democratic Republic of the Congo. It is a typical constituent of the forest-savanna mosaic ecoregion and grows in wooded savannas, where it is often the largest tree.

== Uses ==
The wood is used for such purposes as flooring, joinery, furniture, boatbuilding, cattle troughs and drums, but the timber exudes too much gum for high quality joinery and carving. It is also used for firewood and for charcoal manufacture. Long strips of the bark are used to make beehives. The gum produces a fragrant smoke when burned and is used to make torches and incense, and to fumigate houses. The powdered gum is used to make cloth shiny and to create a varnish for furniture.

The young leaves of this tree are cooked and eaten in times of famine; they are also used for cattle fodder, and the leaves, bark, roots and gum are used in traditional medicine, both internally and externally, for a range of conditions. Lumps of gum can be chewed, used to fill teeth or made into beads, and the bark is used in brewing beer. The tree is a pioneer species and is used in forest regeneration, and the fragrant flowers are a rich source of nectar for bees.
