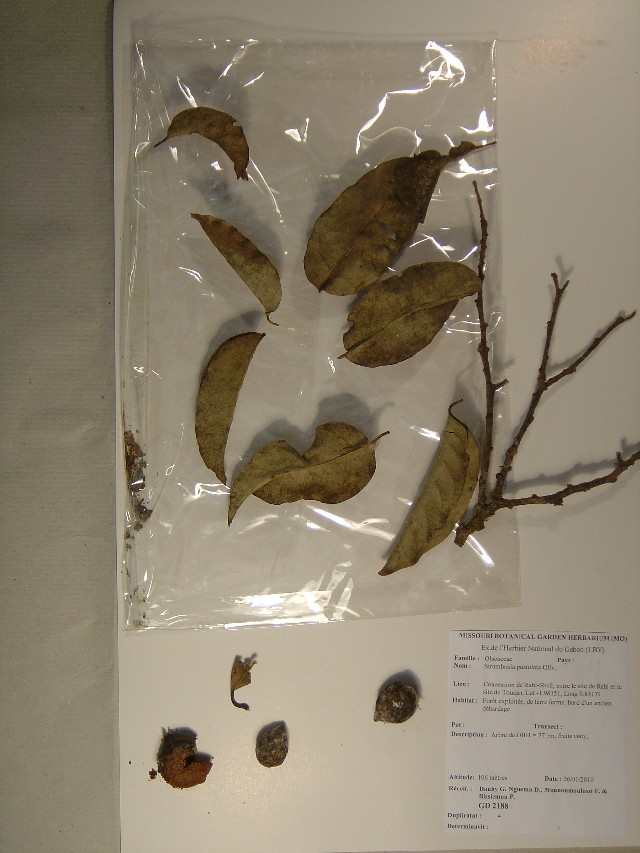

Conservation status
- Least Concern (IUCN 3.1)

Scientific classification
- Kingdom: Plantae
- Clade: Tracheophytes
- Clade: Angiosperms
- Clade: Eudicots
- Order: Santalales
- Family: Olacaceae
- Genus: Strombosia
- Species: S. pustulata

Binomial name
- Strombosia pustulata Oliv.

Synonyms
- Strombosia glaucescens Engl.

= Strombosia pustulata =

Species of rainforest tree in West and Central Africa

Strombosia pustulata is a species of tree in the family Olacaceae. It is native to the rainforests of tropical West and Central Africa. Common names for this tree include itako in Nigeria, afina in Ghana, poé in Abé spoken in Côte d'Ivoire and mba esogo in Equatorial Guinea.

== Description ==
Strombosia pustulata is a medium-sized evergreen tree growing to a height of 25 to 35 m (80 to 110 ft). The trunk is cylindrical and up to a metre in diameter, flaring slightly at the base. The bark is greyish-black with small corky lenticels, developing greenish scales in older trees. The inner bark is thin, hard and yellowish, with a granular texture. The crown is compact and rounded, and the twigs are slightly angled. The leaves have short petioles and are alternate, oblong-elliptical, about 10 cm (4 in) long with asymmetric bases and acute apices; their texture is thick and papery, and they are somewhat pustular in appearance. The flowers are very small and numerous, growing on the twigs, white, yellow or green, with parts in fives. The fruits are globular drupes up to 3 cm (1 in) in diameter, purplish-black when ripe, each enclosed in a fleshy calyx. Each fruit contains a single seed with a wrinkled surface.

== Distribution and habitat ==
Strombosia pustulata is native to the tropical rainforests of West and Central Africa, its range extending from Senegal to the Central African Republic and the Democratic Republic of the Congo. Its typical habitat is well-drained soil in dense forest in high rainfall areas, often beside rivers or lakes, at altitudes of up to about 770 m (2,500 ft).

== Human uses ==
The heartwood is pinkish-brown and the sapwood is thick and yellowish. The timber is hard and durable and is resistant to termites. It is used in construction and for transmission poles, as well as for making tool handles, wood veneers, carving and heavy-duty flooring. The tree is also used in folk medicine, with the bark, leaves and seeds being used for varying purposes in different parts of its range.

== Ecology ==
The fruits are eaten both by birds, such as hornbills, and by elephants, and these play a part in distributing the seeds.
