= Economy of Nigeria =

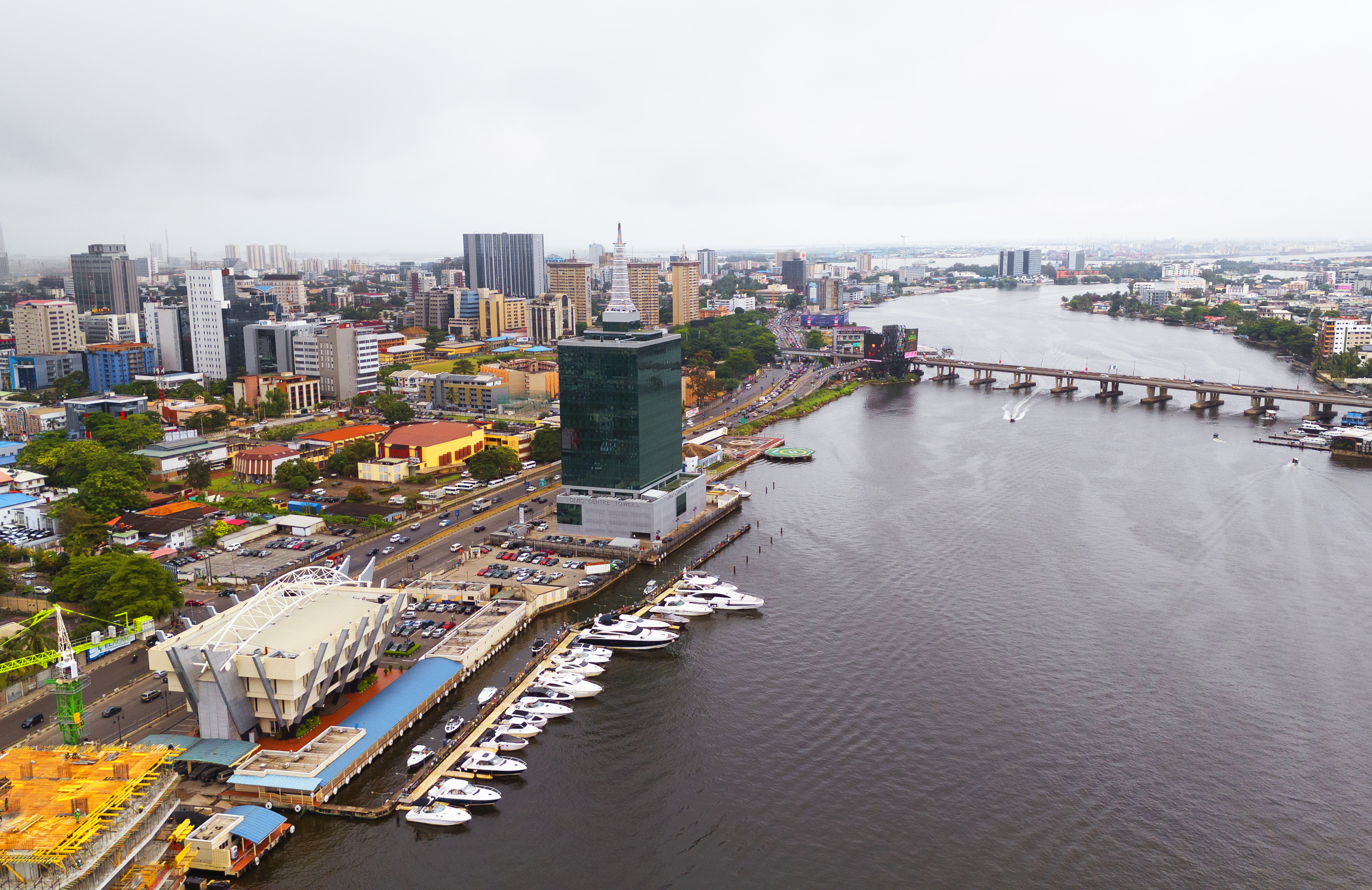
- Lagos, the financial centre of Nigeria
- Currency: Nigerian naira (NGN, ₦)
- Fiscal year: 1 January – 31 December
- Trade organisations: AU, AfCFTA, ECOWAS, WTO, UN, Commonwealth of Nations, NAM, G24, OIC, Developing-8
- Country group: Developing/Emerging; Lower-middle income economy

Statistics
- Population: ▲223,804,632 (2023)
- GDP: ▲$285.003 billion (nominal; 2025); ▲$2.254 trillion (PPP; 2025)
- GDP rank: 52nd (nominal; 2025); 19th (PPP; 2025)
- GDP growth: ▲4.1% (2026)
- GDP per capita: ▲$1,200 (nominal; 2025); ▲$9,488 (PPP; 2025)
- GDP per capita rank: 173rd (nominal; 2025); 135th (PPP; 2025)
- GDP per capita growth: 1.9% (2024)
- GDP by sector: Agriculture: 28.66%; Industry: 15.42%; Services: 55.92%; (2025)
- Inflation (CPI): ▲15.69% (April 2026) NBS; 16.0% (2026 est.) IMF
- Population below national poverty line: ▲30.9% on less than $2.15/day (2025) ▲63.5% on less than $3.65/day (2025)
- Gini coefficient: ▼35.1 medium (2018/2025 baseline)
- Human Development Index: ▲0.560 medium (2023) (161st)
- Corruption Perceptions Index: ▲26 out of 100 points (2025, 142nd rank)
- Labour force: ▲100,571,000 (Q1 2024)
- Labour force by occupation: Farming, forestry, and fishing (Agriculture): 26.1%; Retail, wholesale trade, and hospitality (Services): 23.4%; Manufacturing, mining, and quarrying (Industry): 12.8%; Accommodation, food, and transportation: 11.5%; Professional, science, and technology: 9.2%; Managerial, finance, and insurance: 6.1%; Education and health services: 5.8%; Other services and administration: 5.1%; (2025)
- Unemployment: ▼4.9% (2025 est.)
- Informal employment: 92.8% (2024)
- Main industries: Cement, oil refining, construction and construction materials, food processing and food products, beverages and tobacco, textiles, apparel and footwear, pharmaceutical products, wood products, pulp paper products, chemicals, ceramic products, plastic and rubber products, electrical and electronic products, base metals: iron and steel, information technology, automobile manufacturing, and other manufacturing (2015)

External
- Exports: ▲$61.68 billion (2025)
- Export goods: Petroleum and crude oil products, liquefied natural gas, kerosene-type jet fuel, other petroleum gases, Urea, manufactured goods, and standard quality cocoa beans (2025)
- Main export partners: Netherlands 10.72%; India 9.64%; Spain 9.02%; France 7.19%; Canada 5.42%; (2025)
- Imports: ▼$46.85 billion (2025)
- Import goods: Premium Motor Spirit (petrol), durum wheat, crude petroleum oils, cane sugar (for refining), used vehicles, chemicals, machinery, and industrial raw materials (2025)
- Main import partners: China 31.22%; United States 9.34%; Netherlands 8.80%; India 6.47%; Brazil 3.97%; (2025)
- FDI stock: ▼$69.21 billion (2024 stock); ▼ Abroad: $11.83 billion (2024 stock)
- Current account: ▲$14.04 billion (31 December 2025)
- Gross external debt: ▼$51.86 billion (31 December 2025)

Public finance
- Government debt: ▼35.0% of GDP (2026 est.)
- Foreign reserves: ▲$48.45 billion (April 2026)
- Budget balance: ▲ ₦23.85 trillion ($17.37 billion); 4.5% of GDP (2026 est.)
- Revenue: ₦34.332 trillion ($24.99 billion); 11.3% of GDP (2026 est.)
- Spending: ₦68.323 trillion ($49.73 billion); 15.6% of GDP (2026 est.)
- Credit rating: Standard & Poor's: B (Domestic); B (Foreign); Outlook: Stable; Fitch: B; Outlook: Stable; Moody's: B3; Outlook: Stable
- All values, unless otherwise stated, are in US dollars.

Nigeria has a lower-middle-income, mixed economy and emerging market, with expanding manufacturing, financial, service, communications, technology, and entertainment sectors. It is ranked as the 52nd-largest economy in the world in terms of nominal GDP, the second largest in Africa in terms of purchasing power parity, and the 19th-largest in terms of purchasing power parity. The country's re-emergent manufacturing sector became the largest on the continent in 2013, and it produces a large proportion of goods and services for the region of West Africa. Nigeria's debt-to-GDP ratio was 36.63% in 2021 according to the IMF.

Although oil revenues contributed 2/3 of state revenues, oil only contributes about 9% to the GDP. Nigeria produces about 2.7% of the world's oil supply. The largely subsistence agricultural sector has not kept up with the country's rapid population growth. It was once a large net exporter of food, but currently imports some of its food products. Mechanization has led to a manufacturing resurgence and food export and there was consequently a move towards food sufficiency.

In 2006, Nigeria came to an agreement with the Paris Club to buy back the bulk of its owed debts from them, in exchange for a cash payment of roughly US$12 billion. According to a report by Citigroup, published in February 2011, Nigeria had the highest projected average GDP growth in the world between 2010 and 2050. Nigeria is one of two countries from Africa among the 11 Global Growth Generators countries.

== Overview ==
In 2014, Nigeria established a new base level GDP to account for fast-growing industries such as telecommunications, banking, and its film industry to its economy. Human capital is underdeveloped, as Nigeria ranked 161 out of 189 countries in the United Nations Development Index in 2019, and non-energy-related infrastructure is inadequate.

Nigeria has advanced efforts to provide universal primary education, and protect the environment.

Economic development has been hampered by government corruption. However, while broad-based progress has been slow, these efforts are becoming visible in international surveys of corruption. Nigeria's ranking has mostly improved since 2001, ranking 154 out of 180 countries in Transparency International's 2021 Corruption Perceptions Index.

The Nigerian economy suffers from an ongoing supply crisis in the power sector. Despite a rapidly growing economy, some of the world's largest deposits of oil, coal, and gas, and the country's status as Africa's largest oil producer, power supply difficulties are frequently experienced by residents.

Two-thirds of Nigerians expect living conditions to improve in the coming decades. According to the National Bureau of Statistics (NBS) Nigeria's GDP grew by 3.19% in Q2 2024. The non-oil sector drove growth, expanding by 4.13%, while the oil sector contracted by -3.83%.

== History ==
=== Pre-colonial times, the transatlantic slave trade ===
Before 1800, the 14 Hausa states in northern Nigeria were civilisational leaders; at that time, there was already a body of Hausa literature, including historical works (the Kano Chronicle) and anthropological studies (on the Yoruba). For their part, the Yoruba, with the Oyo Empire, formed a second centre of power in pre-colonial Nigeria, combining superior economic strength with military dominance. Slavery had long existed in large parts of Nigeria, but this was increasingly exacerbated from 1700 onwards by the European (affluent) demand for slaves for plantations in North and South America.

Only where the savannah in West Africa reached the coast were there European trading posts: tiny settlements that changed hands repeatedly due to the constant illness of their light-skinned inhabitants (Africa was, for good reason, regarded as the 'white man's grave'). Along the much longer stretches where mosquito-infested lagoons lie between land and sea (and thus provide ideal conditions for the transmission of malaria), European trading ships – British, French, Dutch, Danish – anchored at a safe distance, whilst local traders approached in small boats to offer their wares for sale. In addition to ivory and gold, these goods also included slaves; accordingly, the West African coastal regions were named the Ivory Coast, the Gold Coast (Ghana) and the Slave Coast (Nigeria). According to historian Toyin Falola, European demand after 1700 transformed the previously mixed economy of southern Nigeria into a veritable slave economy. Other buyers of slaves were the Fulani rulers in northern Nigeria, who by 1805 had subjugated the 14 Hausa states and established an Islamic theocracy, thereby heralding a civilisational, technological and economic decline in northern Nigeria.

As a result of Napoleon's Continental Blockade, the transatlantic slave trade shifted to Portuguese, Cuban and Brazilian galleons and brigs. By 1800, England, Denmark and Scotland had already abolished slavery; in 1807, Great Britain also enacted the Slave Trade Act and began hunting down slave ships in the Atlantic (a large portion of the Royal Navy's budget was allocated to this effort, with the freed slaves being disembarked and the ship's crew tried in Freetown, Sierra Leone). The Royal Navy also exerted pressure in negotiations with local rulers to put a stop to the slave trade. They met with resistance, as many local kings financed themselves by selling their subjects into slavery (such as the kings of Benin or King Pebble of Bonny; in Lagos, the slave trade was in the hands of the king's sister, Efunroye Tinubu). The local nobility therefore had little interest in following the somewhat sudden British shift from slave traders to opponents of slavery. – At the same time, British and German missionaries began establishing outposts in Badagry, Abeokuta and Calabar. Here they built churches, hospitals and mission schools, but also trading houses to finance them (the firm that would later become Nigeria's largest cocoa trader was consequently named the 'Basel Mission'). The missionaries' activities also aroused the displeasure of the local rulers, whereupon the Europeans sought protection from their home countries. Thanks to the widespread use of quinine as a prophylactic against malaria, it had been possible since 1855 to station European troops permanently on the African mainland. In London, Paris, Brussels, Lisbon and elsewhere, it was therefore deemed necessary and feasible to establish pointlike bases of influence along the West African coast; the chapter on the transatlantic slave trade was thus brought to a close by opening a new chapter: that of colonial rule.

After Lagos became a 'consulate' in 1851, a naval base in 1855 and a British colony (and the nucleus of the future colony of Nigeria) in 1861, the transatlantic slave trade from the Nigerian coast to America was a thing of the past. Instead, in 1861 the lagoon city began a rapid rise to become the dominant regional trading centre. The local trading magnates and moneylenders (predominantly 'Saro', i.e. slaves who had returned from Sierra Leone, and 'Aguda', former slaves who had remigrated from Brazil and Cuba) transformed the marshy islet of Lagos into the 'Venice of West Africa' during a 30-year economic boom, laying the foundations for today's financial, commercial, technological and media metropolis.

The years following the Panic of 1873 were marked by a prolonged global economic crisis (1873 to 1888), whilst in Brazil the local rubber and cocoa barons flaunted their wealth (they even had opera houses and theatres built in the jungle using imported building materials). In 1879, Captain James Davies broke the Brazilian cocoa monopoly in an adventurous manner and made the area around Lagos, inhabited mainly by the Yoruba, quite prosperous through the production of the raw material for chocolate (until it was overtaken by the Ivory Coast around 1930). These events triggered the “Scramble for Africa” in Europe – the expansion of previously pointlike colonies into planar areas in order to cultivate the cold-sensitive but profitable cocoa and rubber plants there. Shortly afterwards, from 1893 to 1903, Great Britain expanded its colonial holdings in what is now Nigeria, first into Yoruba territory, and ultimately at the expense of the Fulani Empire in the north. In doing so, a new type of weapon was deployed: the machine gun, the 'Maxim'. In January 1914, the colonial power consolidated the conquered territory under the artificial name 'Nigeria' to act as a counterweight to the German colony of Cameroon, which had almost doubled in size by 1911 (see Second Moroccan Crisis).

Unlike their ancestors, however, the British of that era were no longer driven by missionary zeal or the liberation of slaves, but by imperialist ambitions. They allowed slavery to continue in their new territory for another 33 years, did not build hospitals or schools as they had previously done in the south, and accepted Islam – not out of religious tolerance, but out of indifference to the question of which god His Majesty's new subjects worshipped. Thus, the backwardness imposed by the Fulani Caliphate exacerbated in northern Nigeria even under the British flag. The once-great culture and literature of the Hausa fell increasingly into oblivion.

=== Colonial economy ===
During the colonial era under British rule, the Nigerian economy was primarily dependent on the export of cocoa, palm oil and groundnuts, and thus on fluctuations in the respective world market prices and structural shifts. Imports consisted primarily of spirits (rum, schnapps, gin/genever), as well as, to a much lesser extent, English cloth, building materials and, in fourth place, machinery/tools. Nigeria's trade balance was largely in equilibrium during the colonial era. Over 95% of the Governor's state budget was financed by import and export duties; thanks to its seaports such as Lagos, Badagry, Warri, Port Harcourt, Bonny and Calabar, the southern half of the colony was among the few 'profitable' colonial administrations in Africa, whereas the impoverished and feudal north had to be financed by the British Crown.

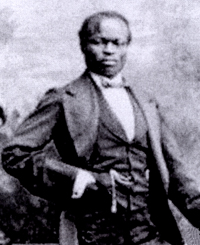
James Pinson Labulo Davies, introduced cocoa cultivation in Africa, 1862

As a British colony, Nigeria benefited from 'Imperial Preference' – a tariff reduction granted by the United Kingdom to its colonies and dominions, setting the rate at a quarter of that levied on imports from other countries. (The aim – particularly following the Empire's Economic Conference in Ottawa in 1932 – was to bring the British-ruled territories together into a single economic zone. At that time, Great Britain ruled over a quarter of the world's land mass, so the 'Imperial Preference' effectively constituted a very large economic union.) Transactions were settled in West African pounds, which were pegged at a 1:1 ratio to the British pound. Whilst this brought Nigeria fiscal stability, it also paralysed the economy – both in the mother country and in colonies such as Nigeria – particularly from 1925 onwards, following Britain's return to the gold standard. Even as a colony, Nigeria thus suffered from an overvalued national currency and the resulting economic consequences. Among these was the fact that the Ivory Coast, as a French colony, overtook Nigeria as the world's leading cocoa producer, and the cocoa trees in Agege were felled in 1930.

Nigeria's colonial economy differed in several respects from other African colonies of the time. In terms of population, Nigeria was the British Empire's second-largest colony after India (Canada, Australia, New Zealand and South Africa were dominions, whilst Egypt was formally an independent kingdom), and the colonial power sought to govern the country with as little personnel as possible. Against this backdrop, extensive use was made of the local human potential, in return for which civil and economic freedoms were granted that were unknown in other African colonies.

Agricultural products were not produced by European settlers on plantations, but by local smallholders. Farmers, particularly cocoa farmers, were considered wealthy and were often organised into agricultural cooperatives such as Jacob Kehinde Coker's Agege Planters' Union, Africa's first agricultural cooperative (1903). Under British rule, Nigeria had a good infrastructure (e.g. the second-largest rail network in Africa, after South Africa) and a relatively well-developed industry (in the Lagos suburb of Ebute Metta, for example, locomotives and railway carriages were manufactured for the Nigerian Railways). The colony's financial sector and property market were predominantly in the hands of locals such as Candido da Rocha (the son of a Brazilian slave) and Taiwo Olowo, who laid the foundations for Lagos's current status as an African financial centre. Commercial banks and credit institutions were even run exclusively by locals such as Richard Beale Blaize and Isaac B. Williams, until around 1900 when the Bank of British West Africa (now First Bank of Nigeria) and the Sterling Bank established branches in Lagos (though they primarily acted as customer banks). The trading houses in colonial Nigeria were initially predominantly local and later predominantly European, as the local traders like Samuel Pearse concentrated their businesses heavily on their own person and therefore had difficulty in appointing a suitable successor. German traders (G.L. Gaiser, Witte & Bausch, Königsdorfer, A. Schlesinger, G. Gottschalck) as well as three Swiss cocoa buyers (e.g. the aforementioned Basel Mission, later known as the Union Trade Company, or the Société Commerciale de l'Ouest Africain, SCOA) dominated import and export trade after the First World War. The British colonial administration (unlike, for example, that of German South-West Africa) did not restrict ships to those of the colonial power's national shipping companies in the ports, but allowed international competition at the quayside. Nigerian ports were therefore served not only by the mail ships of the British Elder Dempster Company and the cargo ships of John Holt, but also by Hamburg's HAPAG, Bremen's Lloyd, Geneva's MSC, the Holland-Africa-Lijn, the Compagnie Maritime Belge, the Danish Møller-Mærsk, etc. There was no indigenous shipping company, but Nigerian merchants often chartered cargo ships on their own initiative to export the country's produce overseas when the rates charged by the aforementioned shipping companies seemed too high to them. In 1916, the Nigerian merchant Peter Thomas (also a descendant of slaves) alone accounted for 13% of the cargo leaving Nigeria by ship in this manner.

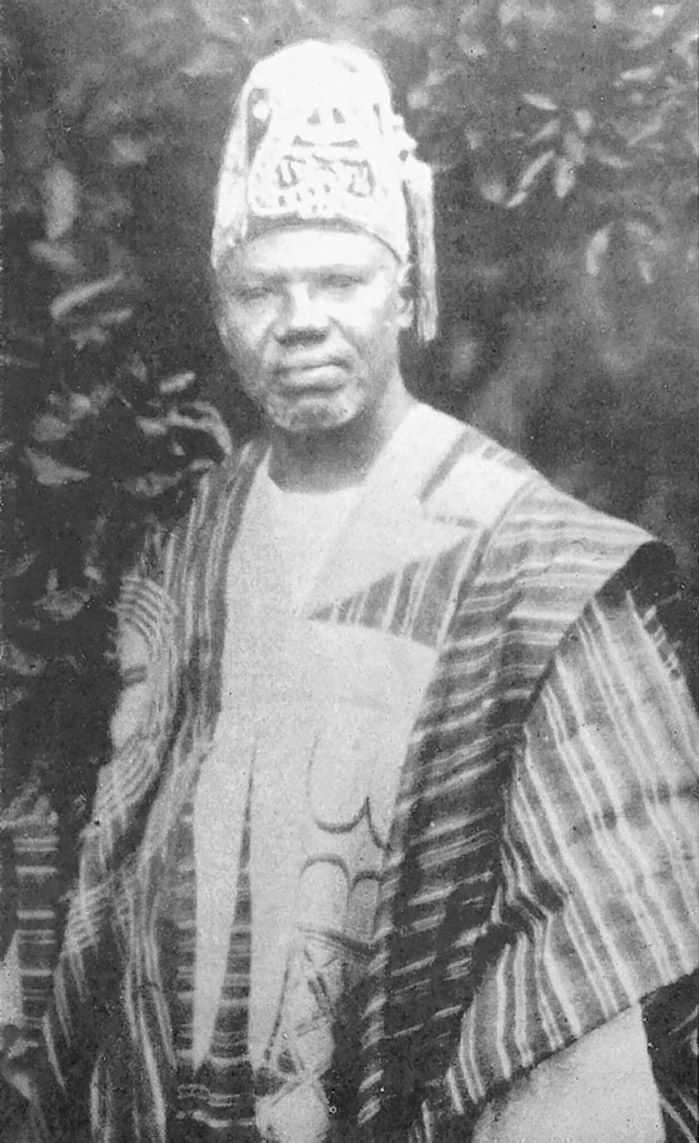
Jacob Kehinde Coker, founder of the first African cooperative, father of cocoa cultivation in Yorubaland, father of the "African Church"

The British allowed a free and prosperous press in Nigeria (again, unlike other colonial powers such as France, Germany, Portugal, Belgium or Italy), including the most critical publications: Nnamdi Azikiwe's West African Pilot and Anthony Enahoro's Daily Comet. Local press magnates such as Olayinka Herbert Macaulay were heavyweights in both economic and political spheres (Macaulay, 'the wizard', even had his own intelligence service and reportedly read the telegrams from the Colonial Office to the British governor before they reached the latter) Macaulay and Azikiwe were also leaders of independent parties (the NNDP, NYM and NCNC respectively), which called for independence in an increasingly urgent tone. There were also labour unions that successfully organised strikes on behalf of workers, including the teachers' union NUT under Israel Oludotun Ransome-Kuti, the father of the future singer Fela Kuti, and Nigeria's oldest union, the PWU, representing public service employees (founded in 1908). The most radical trade unions were those of the railway workers, the RWU, led by the turner Michael ('Pa') Imoudo, and those of the miners in the coal mines of Enugu. The best-connected group was the market women's association, led by Funmilayo Ransome-Kuti, the wife of the aforementioned Israel Kuti. – It is also significant that Nigeria's highest court of appeal, the Privy Seal in London, was already overturning governors' decisions as early as the 1920s.

This advocacy by the local press, the political parties, the labour and cooperative movements, and the legal profession also achieved successes. As early as 1895, an angry mob of local (dark-skinned) homeowners in Lagos outside the governor's villa had prevented the planned property and land tax from being introduced (instead, the duty on spirits was increased). In 1921, Macaulay successfully secured a substantial compensation payment for Chief Tijani from the Privy Seal for land that the governor had confiscated for the construction of Apapa Harbour. In doing so, Macaulay put his skills as an editorial writer and his legal expertise to good use. In 1929, a women's uprising (the so-called 'Women's War') had prevented the introduction of a general income tax (which would not be introduced until 2025). In 1930, Macaulay won a case before the Privy Seal against the expulsion of the Oba of Lagos, Eshugbayi Eleko, from the capital on the orders of Governor Graeme Thomson. Macaulay had spent several years litigating through all the courts and reported on it extensively in his gazettes; following his legal defeat, the frustrated Thomson had himself transferred to the governorship of Ceylon, now Sri Lanka. In 1937, the outraged public in the Gold Coast (Ghana) and Nigeria brought about the dissolution of the cartel of 17 European cocoa buyers (including subsidiaries of Unilever and Cadbury) just a few weeks after its formation. In the summer of 1945, the first general strike organised by the Nigeria Trades Union Congress (NTUC) ultimately led to the removal of the reactionary Governor Richards and the release of Imoudo, who had been imprisoned since 1943 on charges of sabotage.

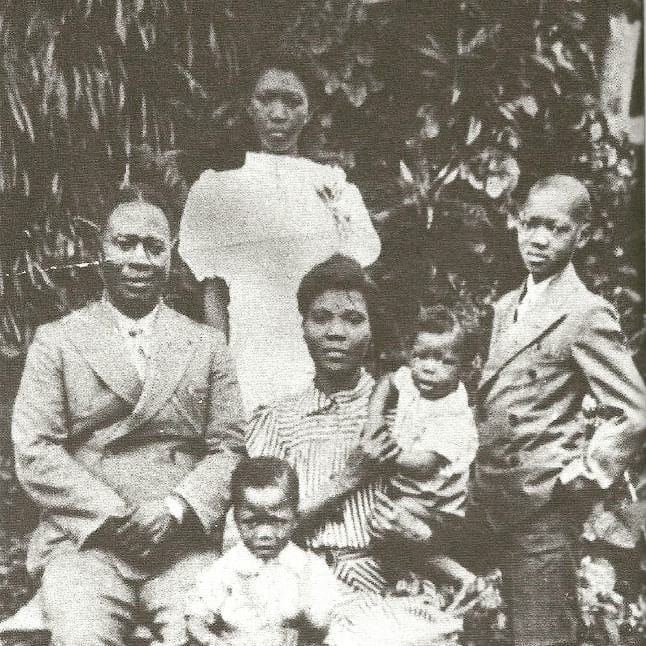
Israel Kuti (left), Funmilyao Kuti (centre), Fela Kuti (bottom), ca. 1940

Only the upper and middle echelons of the colonial administration remained (until independence in 1960) a purely European ('white') affair – dark-skinned people were allowed to rise no higher than the rank of 'chief clerk' (office manager), even though prior to 1890 the acting governor (Charles Pike), the colonial police chief (A. C. Willoughby) and the head of the education authority (Henry Carr) had been dark-skinned and had performed their duties well. Where projects could not be managed by the British, this was largely left to members of the Igbo, who, having embraced Christianity, the alphabet and basic arithmetic a little faster than other ethnic groups (some even receiving secondary education), allowed themselves to be posted to every corner of the country for the jobs delegated by the British, and soon became quite unpopular with their compatriots – with far-reaching consequences (see next chapter).

The high level of economic participation by the local population, their dominance in the capital and property markets and in the ownership of the most important means of production, the colony's openness to international markets, the effective representation of local interests, and the favourable stance of the highest court of appeal were unthinkable in other African colonies (and at times also in European countries such as Germany and Italy). This raises the question of whether 'exploitation' by the colonial power, Great Britain, took place in the strict sense of the word in colonial Nigeria, and whether the term 'colonialism' needs to be defined more broadly.

=== Independence, oil and civil war ===
After the British pound (and, shortly afterwards, the currencies of other colonial powers such as France, Belgium, Portugal and the Netherlands) had lost over 30% of its value in September 1949, the already loss-making colonial system exceeded what the economy of the United Kingdom could still afford. The embarrassment suffered by the British and French during the Suez Crisis of 1956 thus made a 'healthy downsizing' of the British, French and Belgian economies inevitable. Within a few years (1957 to 1964), almost all African colonies were granted independence. In the hasty decolonisation process, it was not even clarified who was to pay the pensions of the former colonial officials. – The rush came from the former colonial rulers, whilst in northern Nigeria, for example, the locals sought to delay and postpone decolonisation as much as possible. In fact, the independence movement was not prepared for the sudden responsibility of government and had neither the necessary experts nor a plan for how to turn the Europeans' loss-making colonial enterprise with cocoa beans, palm oil and peanuts into a profitable venture under its own management. However, the problem seemed to resolve itself.

In 1956, oil fields were discovered in the south of the country; Nigeria has been producing and exporting oil since 1958. Given the civil achievements of the Yoruba and Igbo in the southern Nigerian port cities listed above and the prospect of the lucrative oil business in the Niger Delta, international forecasts regarding Nigeria's independence in 1960 were extremely optimistic. The name 'Nigeria' still had a positive ring to it. Yet commentators generally overlooked the fact that in the north, amongst the Hausa and Fulani, there was a vast hinterland where these favourable developments had passed completely by and where quasi-medieval conditions still prevailed (around 1880, northern Nigeria apparently had the world's largest slave population – even ahead of Brazil; slavery had only been banned in the northern half of Nigeria in 1936 at the insistence of Governor Bourdillon). The enormous social and ethnic tensions would ultimately tear Nigeria's 'First Republic' apart and lead to pogroms against the Igbo as well as to civil war (the Biafran War, 1967 to 1970), one of the worst humanitarian disasters of modern times. In this, 'black gold' played a fateful, conflict-exacerbating role. Following the defeat of Biafra and the (better-educated) Igbo, Nigeria lost many skilled professionals, especially as many Britons had returned home after independence in 1960. Over the following decades, Nigeria faced a shortage of skilled workers and qualified managers.

=== Seemingly golden times ===
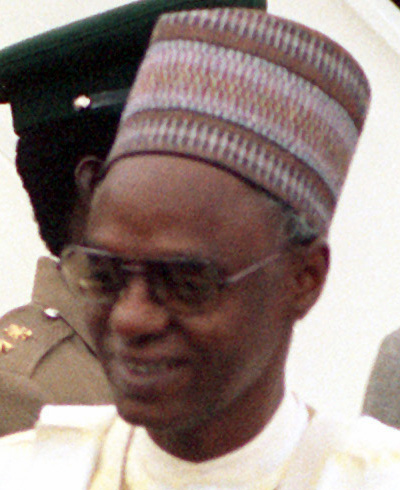
Shehu Shagari 1980

In the 1970s, under dictator Gowon (1967 to 1975), the oil companies' lucrative oil production and export licences were consolidated organisationally within the NNPC and placed under the central government to make it more difficult for a province to break away again. Nigeria ranked eighth in the world among oil-producing nations, became a member of OPEC cartel and enjoyed its 'golden years'. Many – including nonsensical – projects were launched. Millions of migrants from neighbouring West African countries worked for Nigerians (according to historian Toyin Falola, every Nigerian family at the time allegedly had a nanny from Ghana).

Oil revenues far exceeded other export earnings and led to an increase in the value of the national currency (one naira was worth almost two US dollars). As a result, other sectors of the economy lost their international competitiveness, and the one-sided nature of the Nigerian economy, its low level of vertical integration and its dependence on the price of oil were exacerbated (see Dutch disease). It was cheaper for Nigerians to import essential products such as rice, cassava etc. than to produce them themselves. Well-intentioned attempts, for example by the VW Group or Peugeot, to manufacture vehicles in Nigeria were unable to compete with the cheap imports of second-hand cars facilitated by the strong naira – despite their great popularity in the country. Attempts to remedy the economic imbalance failed. During Nigeria's “Second Republic” (1979–1983), under the democratically elected President Shagari, the “Green Revolution” in Nigerian agriculture, a housing programme and the development of a steel industry with Soviet assistance all failed due to mismanagement and a lack of skilled labour (the steelworks in Ajaokuta has had thousands of employees since the 1990s, but apparently, due to the lack of a blast furnace, has not yet produced a single pound of steel; no information can be found online regarding the other steelworks built under Shagari, such as the one in Jos). As the state-owned NNPC became increasingly inefficient and oil prices fell, Shagari summarily expelled all migrant workers from the country in 1983 (“Ghana must go”), thereby securing his re-election, but triggering a long-lasting economic crisis and soon being ousted by a coup.

=== Securing power at the expense of the national economy ===
The long-standing dictator Babangida (1985 to 1993) implemented an austerity programme (under which he, for example, abolished the free healthcare system), skilfully juggled the tranches of the national debt and completed the vertical integration of the oil industry – long demanded by economic experts – through four oil-processing refineries in Port Harcourt, Warri and Kaduna. However, after a few productive years, he placed them under the control of non-specialist followers to secure his own power, whereupon the four refineries fell into disrepair. Since then, Nigeria has had to re-import all oil derivatives such as petrol/diesel/kerosene, propane/butane, polypropylene (plastic), engine oils, bitumen/tar etc. for expensive foreign exchange from the European and American refineries to which the crude oil had previously been sold. – Also to consolidate his power, Babangida introduced subsidies for fossil fuels, an ecologically nonsensical cost item for the Nigerian treasury, which, due to the rapidly rising population and the even more sharply increasing number of vehicles of all kinds with combustion engines, strained the Nigerian national budget to such an extent by 2023 that the Nigerian government was rendered virtually incapable of acting. – Babangida also yielded to pressure from the trade unions to artificially prop up the value of the national currency, the naira, to many times its actual worth through constant intervention purchases and strict foreign exchange controls. This made foreign goods very cheap for the average Nigerian consumer; however, domestic products were no longer competitive as a result. Nigerian agriculture and industry, as well as tourism and the already strained state coffers, were ruined by the policy of the strong naira.

Following the sudden death of dictator Abacha in 1998, Nigeria's economy, its infrastructure and all 430 state-owned enterprises were in complete disarray (such as the state-owned airline Nigeria Airways, whose aircraft had crashed, been seized abroad or sold off by management in exchange for lavish bonuses, yet which still had thousands of employees on its payroll; such as the state-owned shipping line, which had lost its cargo ships in a similar manner, and the Nigerian Railways, whose trains no longer ran, which had owed its employees wages for years and whose pension provisions had vanished). To make matters worse, Abacha had turned Nigeria into a foreign policy pariah through his lack of cooperation in the international fight against drugs – which may well have been due to his own drug use.

As Nigeria's dilapidated state-owned refineries were no longer technologically capable of removing sulphur compounds from the fuel (in modern refineries, this is the first step in processing incoming crude oil), 'foul fuel' was dispensed from the petrol pumps. The sulphurous fuels not only assaulted Nigerians' noses with the stench of rotten eggs, but were both toxic and carcinogenic, and destroyed the engines of the vehicles running on them within a few months. The refineries themselves were also, in a sense, destroyed from within by the chemical aggressiveness of the sulphurous products (which can even dissolve steel). Columns, heat exchangers and pipelines, which had only recently passed a visual inspection, appeared to rupture unexpectedly, causing explosions and fires. The damage has not yet been fully repaired (as of 2026). The vertical integration of the Nigerian economy had thus failed for the next thirty years. It was not until 2023 that a new (privately run) refinery was opened, which improved Nigeria's economic vertical integration (see below).

Through his disregard for human rights, Abacha had also sparked a costly guerrilla war with local resistance groups such as MOSOP in the inaccessible Niger Delta (where the oil wells are located). In this neglected and difficult-to-control region, roughly the size of Wales or Massachusetts, tens of thousands of illegal, primitive distilleries, which (to this day) heat crude oil siphoned from pipelines over campfires, extract the lighter and commercially valuable components such as kerosene, and simply dump the remaining heavy components ('heavy oil') into the lagoon. Due to the numerous fire pits, often fed with old car tyres, a smoky haze hangs over the region; its centre, Port Harcourt, ranks among the cities with the worst air quality in the world. Because of the proximity of volatile hydrocarbons to open flames, such illegal distilleries occasionally explode; their operators can be recognised by the scarred burns they bear from minor workplace accidents.

=== Democracy since 1999 ===
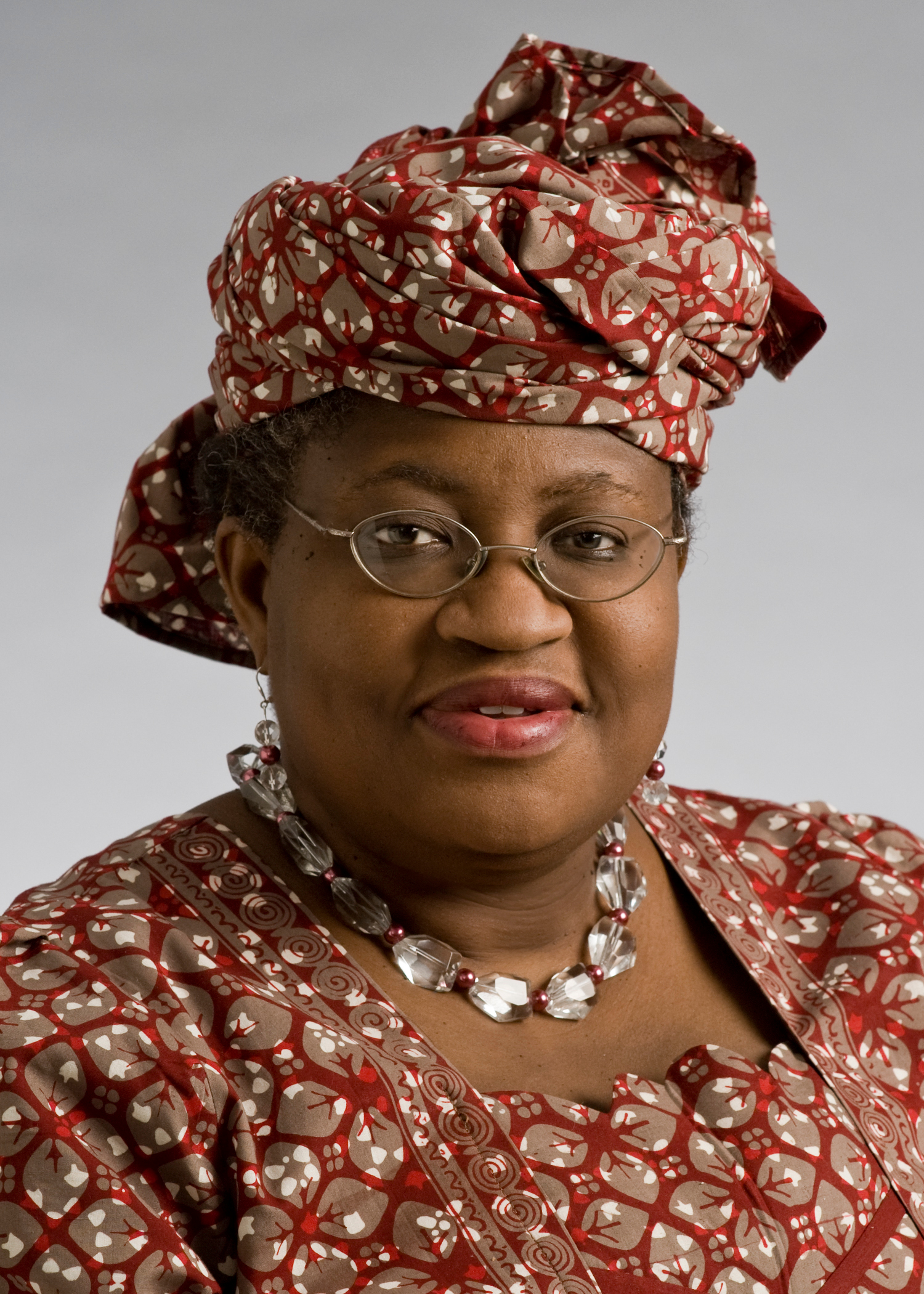
Ngozi Okonjo-Iweala 2008

With Nigeria's return to democracy in 1999 and thanks to the competent economic experts (Ngozi Okonjo-Iweala, Obiageli "Oby" Ezekwesili, Charles Soludo, Nuhu Ribadu) in the cabinet of the first President of the Fourth Republic, Olusegun Obasanjo, the economic situation improved somewhat. (In 2007, Obasanjo even paid off the entire national debt.) However, the lack of vertical integration and the creation of skilled jobs, the policy of a strong naira, petrol subsidies and the low-intensity conflict in the Niger Delta continued to weigh on the Nigerian economy, not to mention other problems such as government incompetence and corruption.

In 2015, for the first (and so far only) time, a sitting President of Nigeria, Goodluck Jonathan of the People's Democratic Party, was voted out of office. He was succeeded by Muhammadu Buhari of the Progressives, who was regarded as incorruptible. Several corrupt officials were removed from office, charged and convicted, including Chief Justice Walter Onnoghen, Attorney General Mohammed Bello Adoke and the head of the anti-corruption agency, Ibrahim Magu. The listed problems facing the Nigerian economy persisted; moreover, oil production fell from its peak in 2005 to half that level due to the increasing rigidity of the state-owned oil company NNPC, leaving Nigeria in 17th place among oil-producing nations. However, through his austerity policies and thanks to capable ministers such as Tunde Fashola (Works) and Rotimi Amaechi (Transport), Buhari was able to free up sufficient funds to implement a number of infrastructure projects (such as the Niger River Bridge at Onitsha and the standard-gauge railway line between Lagos and Ibadan, which has since been operating at a small profit). There were some bright spots in the economy. In 2022, it was revealed that Lagos – and by extension Nigeria – is home to five 'unicorns': high-tech companies valued at over €1 billion. This is on a par with Manchester or Chicago. The Nigerian film industry moved away from low-budget video productions, focused on higher quality and achieved one record-breaking box office success after another (most recently A Tribe Called Judah by Funke Akindele) and even gained international acclaim (My Father's Shadow by Akinola Davies in 2025). Animation studios ventured into the lucrative field of game development. The Nigerian music industry, Afrobeats, took a giant leap forward with the creative use of AutoTune and performances by artists such as Davido, Burna Boy, Wizkid, Asake, Ayra Starr and Tems, and regularly sweeps the board at music awards. In his final days in office, Buhari inaugurated the project of Nigeria's richest man, Aliko Dangote: the privately run oil refinery on the Lekki Peninsula, 50 km from the city centre of the metropolis of Lagos, but 600 km from the country's oil wells. As there was no training centre for oil processing in Lagos and no functioning refinery in the country with the necessary specialists, the prospects for the Dangote refinery were met with scepticism. Dangote had hired 57,000 people for his refinery, but it was unclear whether the quantity of staff was matched by their qualitative suitability.

=== “Hardship” – hard times ===
==== See: The 2023 Nigerian currency crisis ====
Buhari was succeeded in May 2023 by his party colleague Bola Tinubu. In his inaugural speech, he announced the end of petrol subsidies, whereupon petrol stations tripled their prices. A full tank of petrol thus costs the average Nigerian a large portion of his monthly salary. – A month later, Tinubu ended the policy of the strong naira: he floated the national currency, and within 12 months it plummeted to a fifth of its former value. The era of “hardship” had begun. Due to the unfavourable exchange rate, Nigerians suddenly found themselves among the poorest people in Africa, and Tinubu became the most unpopular president in the country's history. The fact that Tinubu introduced consistent income tax for the first time in Nigeria did little to improve his popularity either. Furthermore, the president's haste regarding his biggest project – the coastal motorway from Lagos to Calabar, for which he bypassed parliamentary procedures – caused irritation. At least Tinubu received support from an unexpected quarter: the most important resistance group in the Niger Delta, MOSOP, welcomed the resulting infrastructure in their region.

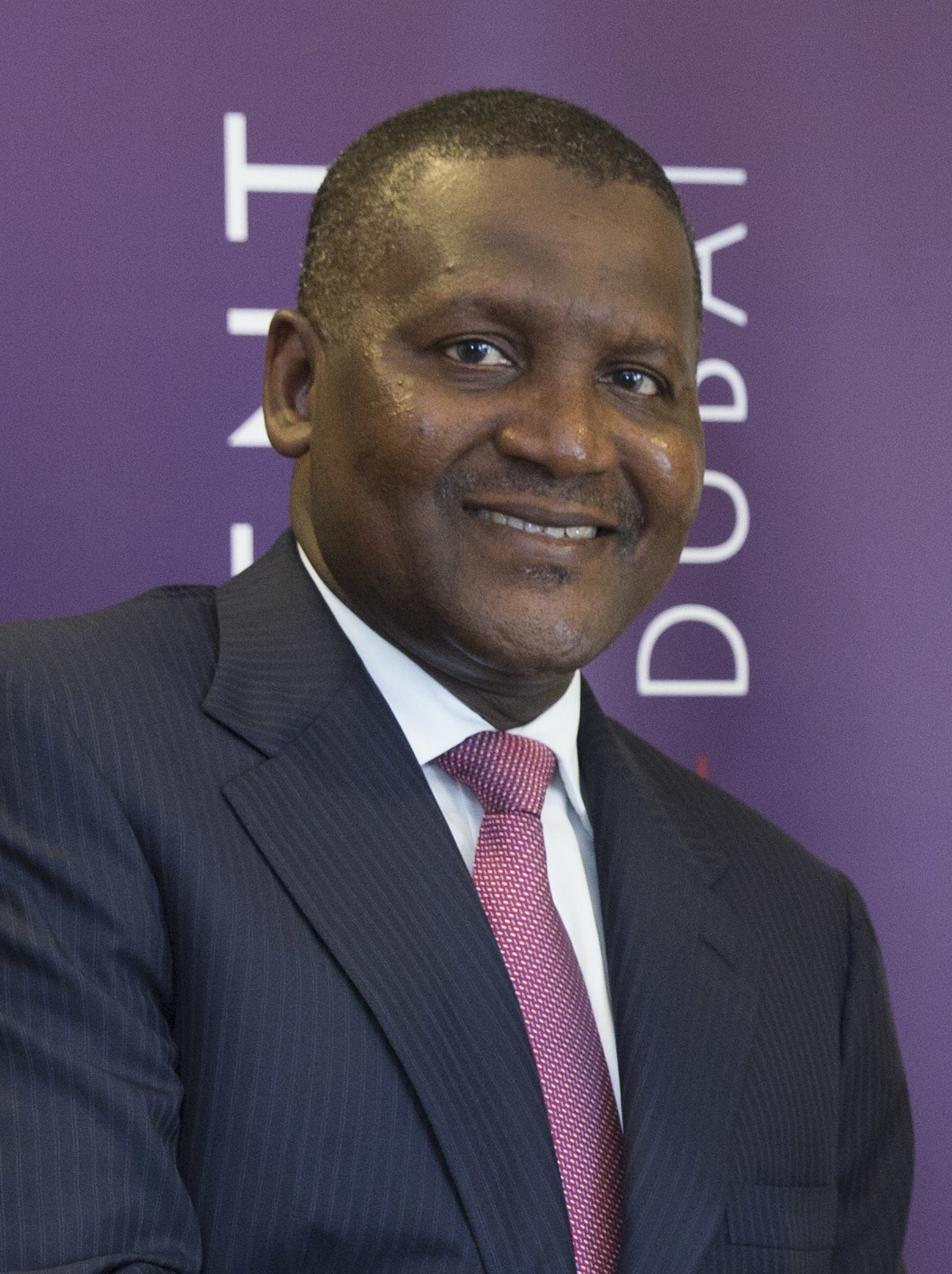
Aliko Dangote 2014

Positive news in Lagos in 2023 included the completion of the “Blue Line”, the first section of the much-needed light rail system, by State Governor Sanwo-Olu and his energetic LAMATA chief Abimbola Akinajo, as well as favourable reports from the Dangote refinery, which soon received European certificates for compliance with environmental standards. At the end of 2025, Aliko Dangote announced a doubling of refinery capacity – the refinery at Lekki would thus become the largest in the world. Almost at the same time, the neighbouring states of Ogun and Ondo began construction of their own refineries. In July 2026, West Africa's largest lithium ore processing plant began operations in Endo (Nasarawa) – marking a further step for Nigeria away from raw material exports and towards greater vertical integration.

Polls in 2026 show that the President's popularity has recovered somewhat, with 53% of respondents viewing him favourably. Tinubu's supporters include, above all, farmers and traders, both of whom benefit from his radical economic policies. Industry, tourism and the regulated share market are also showing signs of a noticeable revival. In April 2026, the Nigerian stock index passed the 200,000-point mark for the first time, after FTSE Russell upgraded Nigeria's economy from 'unclassified' to 'frontier market' and the security situation in the Niger Delta had stabilised.

The state-owned oil company NNPC has underperformed during this period. After one of the four state-owned oil refineries in Port Harcourt had been completely rebuilt in 2025, it emerged in 2026 that operations there had not commenced because it was deemed unprofitable. Other companies in the oil industry have, however, profited from the Strait of Hormuz crisis, and the refinery at Lekki is growing as planned and providing nearly 100,000 people with a comparatively good income and skilled work.

=== Historical statistics ===
As the Central Bank of Nigeria pursued a policy of maintaining a strong naira between 1980 and 2023, Nigeria's currency was systematically overvalued at (ultimately) four to five times its actual value. Any figures for the country's GDP from this period, where expressed in US dollars, must be treated with due reservation.

The following table shows the main economic indicators in 1990–2023 (with IMF staff estimates in 2024–2029). Inflation under 10% is in green.

Year	GDP (in bn. US$PPP)	GDP per capita (in US$ PPP)	GDP (in bn. US$nominal)	GDP per capita (in US$ nominal)	GDP growth (real)	Inflation rate (in Percent)	Government debt (in % of GDP)
1990	165.5	1,739	62.2	653	n/a	n/a	71.7%
1991	▲170.2	▲1,743	▼60.1	▼616	▼-0.6%	n/a	▲75.0%
1992	▲177.9	▲1,776	▼52.3	▼522	▲2.2%	n/a	▼70.2%
1993	▲185.0	▲1,801	▲56.8	▲553	▲1.6%	n/a	▲71.0%
1994	▲189.4	▼1,799	▲80.1	▲761	▲0.3%	n/a	▼55.9%
1995	▲197.0	▲1,825	▲132.2	▲1,225	▲1.9%	n/a	▼34.0%
1996	▲208.7	▲1,886	▲172.7	▲1,560	▲4.1%	▲29.3%	▼25.2%
1997	▲218.5	▲1,925	▲187.9	▲1,656	▲2.9%	▲10.7%	▼24.1%
1998	▲226.4	▲1,947	▲209.7	▲1,803	▲2.5%	▲7.9%	▼22.3%
1999	▲230.8	▼1,935	▼57.5	▼482	▲0.5%	▲6.6%	▲64.9%
2000	▲249.1	▲2,037	▲67.8	▲555	▲5.5%	▲6.9%	▼57.6%
2001	▲271.7	▲2,167	▲73.1	▲583	▲6.7%	▲18.9%	▼53.1%
2002	▲316.2	▲2,459	▲94.0	▲731	▲14.6%	▲12.9%	▼43.3%
2003	▲353.1	▲2,677	▲102.9	▲780	▲9.5%	▲14.0%	▼42.1%
2004	▲400.4	▲2,959	▲130.3	▲963	▲10.4%	▲15.0%	▼35.5%
2005	▲441.9	▲3,182	▲169.6	▲1,222	▲7.0%	▲17.9%	▼18.9%
2006	▲486.2	▲3,411	▲222.8	▲1,563	▲6.7%	▲8.2%	▼9.4%
2007	▲535.9	▲3,662	▲262.2	▲1,792	▲7.3%	▲5.4%	▼8.1%
2008	▲585.5	▲3,897	▲330.3	▲2,198	▲7.2%	▲11.6%	▼7.3%
2009	▲638.4	▲4,137	▼297.5	▼1,927	▲8.4%	▲12.5%	▲8.6%
2010	▲718.9	▲4,535	▲369.1	▲2,328	▲11.3%	▲13.7%	▲9.4%
2011	▲769.6	▲4,727	▲414.1	▲2,544	▲4.9%	▲10.8%	▲17.4%
2012	▲817.4	▲4,888	▲461.0	▲2,756	▲4.3%	▲12.2%	▲17.6%
2013	▲876.2	▲5,101	▲515.0	▲2,998	▲5.4%	▲8.5%	▲18.3%
2014	▲947.7	▲5,372	▲568.5	▲3,223	▲6.3%	▲8.0%	▼17.5%
2015	▲981.9	▲5,421	▼492.4	▼2,719	▲2.7%	▲9.0%	▲20.3%
2016	▼975.2	▼5,244	▼404.6	▼2,176	▼-1.6%	▲15.7%	▲23.4%
2017	▲1,000.7	▼5,242	▼375.7	▼1,969	▲0.8%	▲16.5%	▲24.3%
2018	▲1,041.7	▲5,318	▲421.7	▲2,153	▲1.9%	▲12.1%	▲27.7%
2019	▲1,123.3	▲5,590	▲474.5	▲2,361	▲2.2%	▲11.4%	▲29.2%
2020	▲1,145.7	▼5,558	▼432.7	▼2,099	▼-1.8%	▲13.2%	▲34.5%
2021	▲1,200.1	▲5,677	▲441.6	▼2,089	▲3.6%	▲17.0%	▲35.7%
2022	▲1,327.5	▲6,124	▲476.5	▲2,198	▲3.3%	▲18.8%	▲39.7%
2023	▲1,414.6	▲6,367	▼363.8	▼1,637	▲2.9%	▲24.7%	▲46.4%
2024	▲1,489.8	▲6,543	▼199.7	▼877	▲2.9%	▲32.5%	▲51.3%
2025	▲1,564.9	▲6,706	▼195.0	▼835	▲3.2%	▲25.0%	▼50.0%
2026	▲1,641.5	▲6,866	▲224.8	▲940	▲3.0%	▲15.2%	▼48.9%
2027	▲1,727.6	▲7,054	▲239.4	▲978	▲3.3%	▲15.4%	▼48.5%
2028	▲1,818.0	▲7,248	▲261.0	▲1,040	▲3.3%	▲14.0%	▼49.0%
2029	▲1,912.8	▲7,447	▲268.9	▲1,047	▲3.3%	▲14.0%	▼49.3%

Year	Gross domestic product, (PPP, in billions)	US dollar exchange	Inflation index (2000=100)	Per capita income (as % of US)
1980	*58	1 Naira	1.30	7%
1985	*82	3 Naira	3.20	5%
1990	*118	9 Naira	8.10	2.5%
1995	*155	50 Naira	56	3%
2000	170	100 Naira	100	3.5%
2005	291	130 Naira	207	4%
2010	392	150 Naira	108	5%
2012	451	158 Naira	121	7%
2014	972	180 Naira	10	11%
2015	1,089	220 Naira	10	10%
2016	1,093	280 Naira	17	10%
2017	1,125	360 Naira	5 (est)	10%

NOTES:

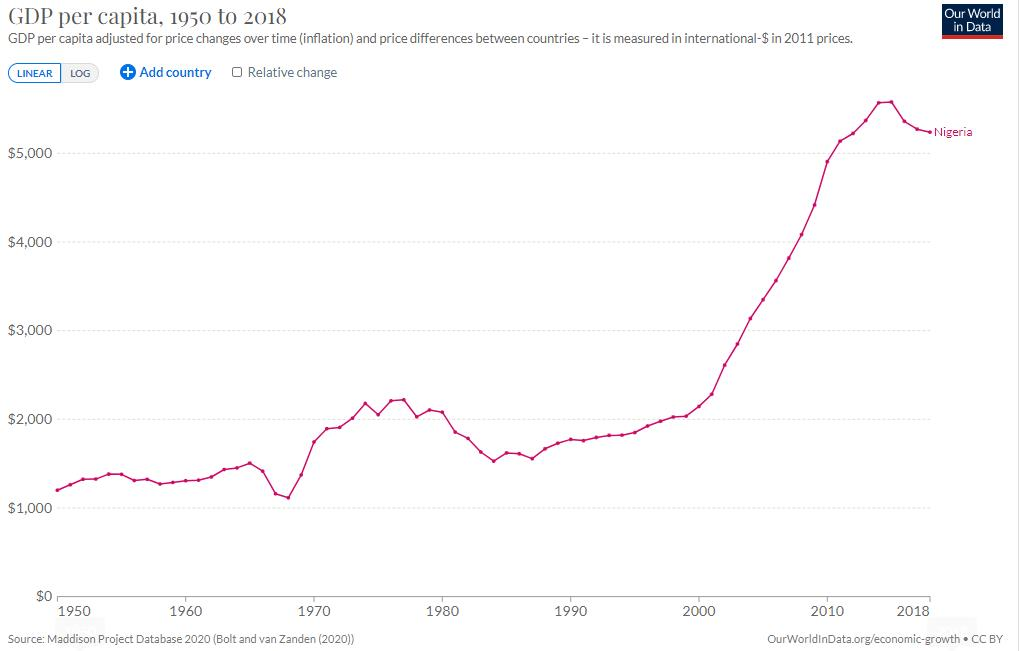
Change in per capita GDP of Nigeria, 1950–2018. Figures are inflation-adjusted to 2011 International Geary–Khamis dollars.

The US dollar exchange rate is an estimated average of the official rate throughout a year and does not reflect the parallel market rate at which the general population accesses foreign exchange. This rate ranged from a high of 520 in March 2017 to a low of 350 in August 2017, due to a scarcity of forex (oil earnings had dropped by half), and speculative activity as alleged by the Central Bank. All the while the official rate was pegged at 360.

Per capita income (as % of US) is calculated using data from estimates in the PPP link above, and census estimates, based on growth rates between census periods. For instance, 2017 GDPs were 1,125 billion (Nigeria) vs. 19,417 billion (US) and populations were estimated at 320 million vs 190 million. The ratio is, therefore (1125/19417) / (190/320), which roughly comes to 0.0975. These are estimates and are intended to get a feel for the relative wealth and standard of living, as well as the market potential of its middle class.

This is a chart of trends of the global ranking of the Nigerian economy, in comparison with other countries of the world, derived from the historical List of countries by GDP (PPP).

Year	2005	2006	2007	2008	2009	2010	2011	2012	2013	2014	2015	2016	2017 (est.)
Ranking	52	47	38	37	34	31	31	30	23	20	21	22	23

This chart shows the variance in the parallel exchange rate at which the Dollar can be obtained with Naira in Lagos, with "Best" being cheaper for a Nigerian (i.e. stronger Naira).

Year	2015	2016	2017	2018	2019
Best	195	345	350	370	380
Worst	237	490	520	430	490

For purchasing power parity comparisons, the US dollar is exchanged at US$1 to 314.27 Nigerian naira (as of 2017).

The current GDP per capita of Nigeria expanded 132% in the sixties reaching a peak growth of 283% in the seventies. But this proved unsustainable, and it consequently shrank by 66% in the 1980s. In the 1990s, diversification initiatives finally took effect and decadal growth was restored to 10%. Although GDP on a PPP basis did not increase until the 2000s.

In 2012, the GDP was composed of the following sectors: agriculture: 40%; services: 30%; manufacturing: 15%; oil: 14%. By 2015, the GDP was composed of the following sectors: agriculture: 18%; services: 55%; manufacturing: 16%; oil: 8%

In 2005 Nigeria's inflation rate was an estimated 15.6%. Nigeria's goal under the National Economic Empowerment Development Strategy (NEEDS) program is to reduce inflation to the single digits. By 2015, Nigeria's inflation stood at 9%. In 2005, the federal government had expenditures of US$13.54 billion but revenues of only US$12.86 billion, resulting in a budget deficit of 5%. By 2012, expenditures stood at $31.61 million, while revenues were $54.48 billion. In 2024, the Central Bank of Nigeria (CBN) raised the Monetary Policy Rate (MPR) again, this time to 18.5%, the 6th consecutive increase since September 2022.

== Agriculture ==
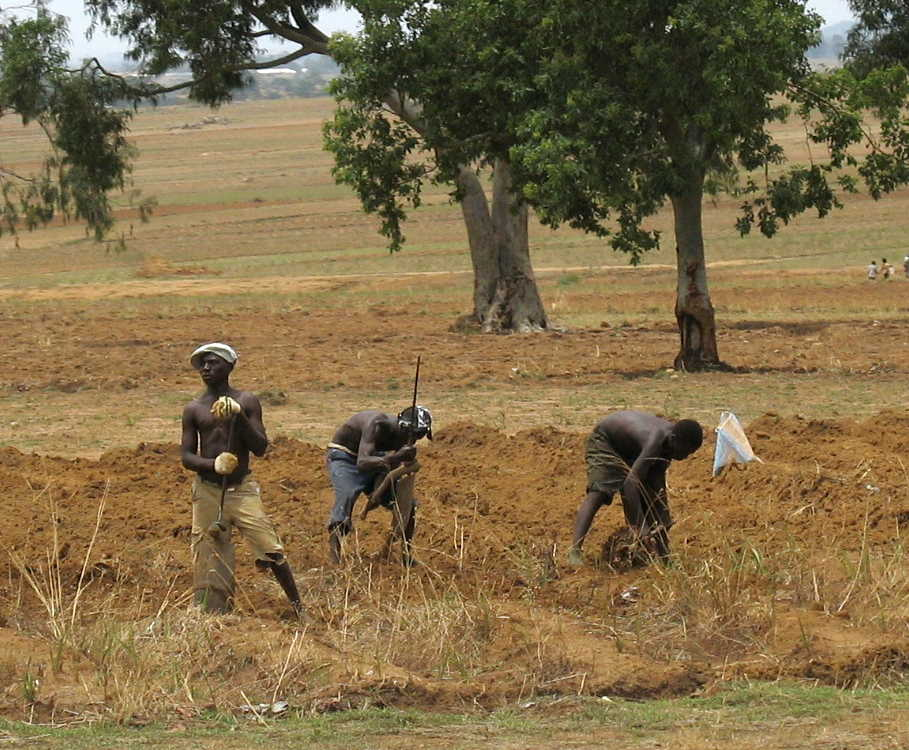
Nigerian farmers in the Middle Belt (2006). 30% of Nigerians are employed in agriculture.

The agricultural sector suffers from extremely low productivity, reflecting reliance on antiquated methods. While Nigeria's population has grown rapidly, its domestic agricultural output has lagged behind, resulting in increased imports of staple crops. However, efforts are being made towards making the country food sufficient again.

=== Crop production ===
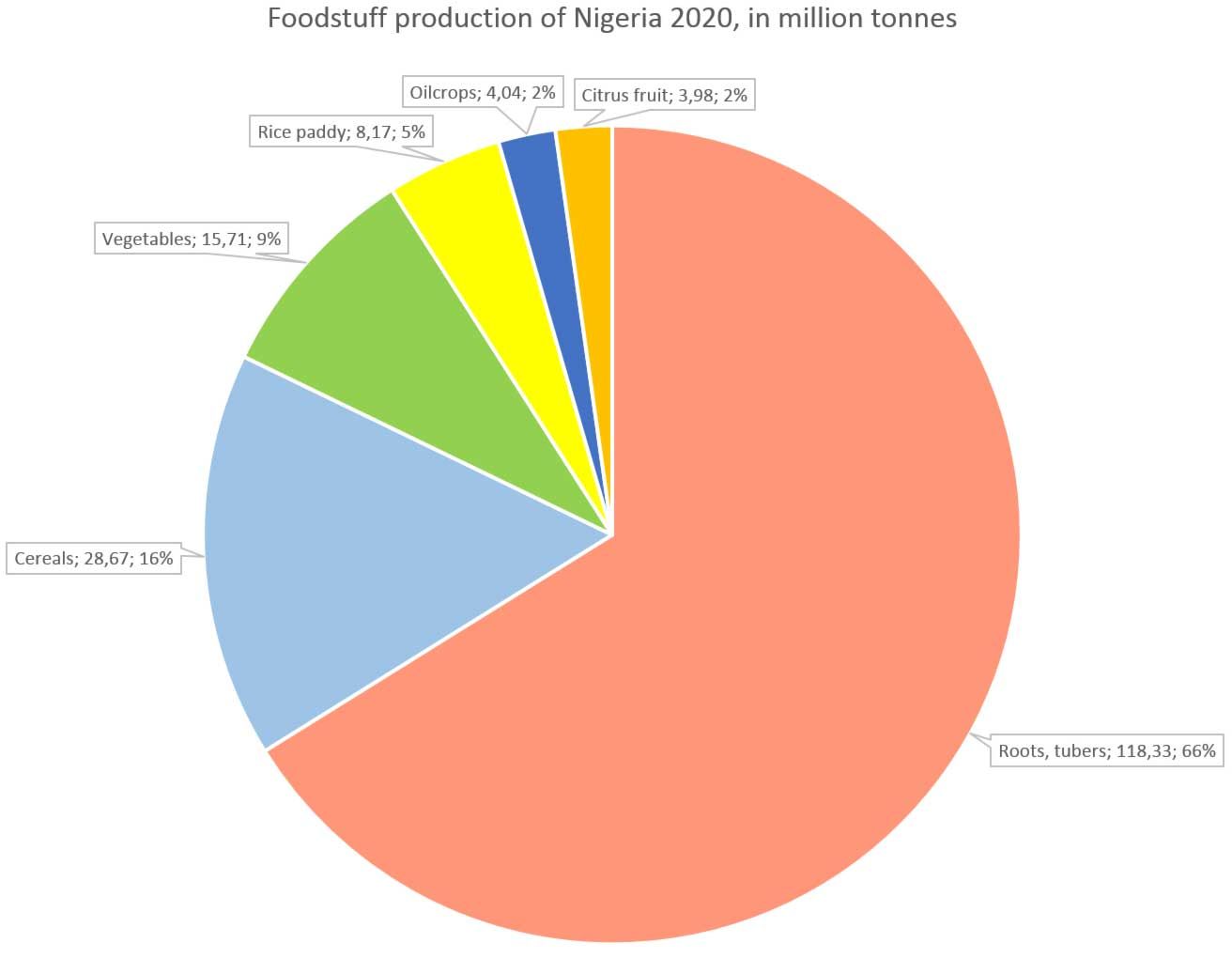
Plant based food production in Nigeria, 2020, in million tonnes

Nigeria ranks sixth worldwide and first in Africa in farm output. The sector accounts for about 18% of GDP and almost one-third of employment. Though Nigeria is no longer a major exporter, due to local consumer boom, it is still a major producer of many agricultural products.

==== Roots and tubers ====
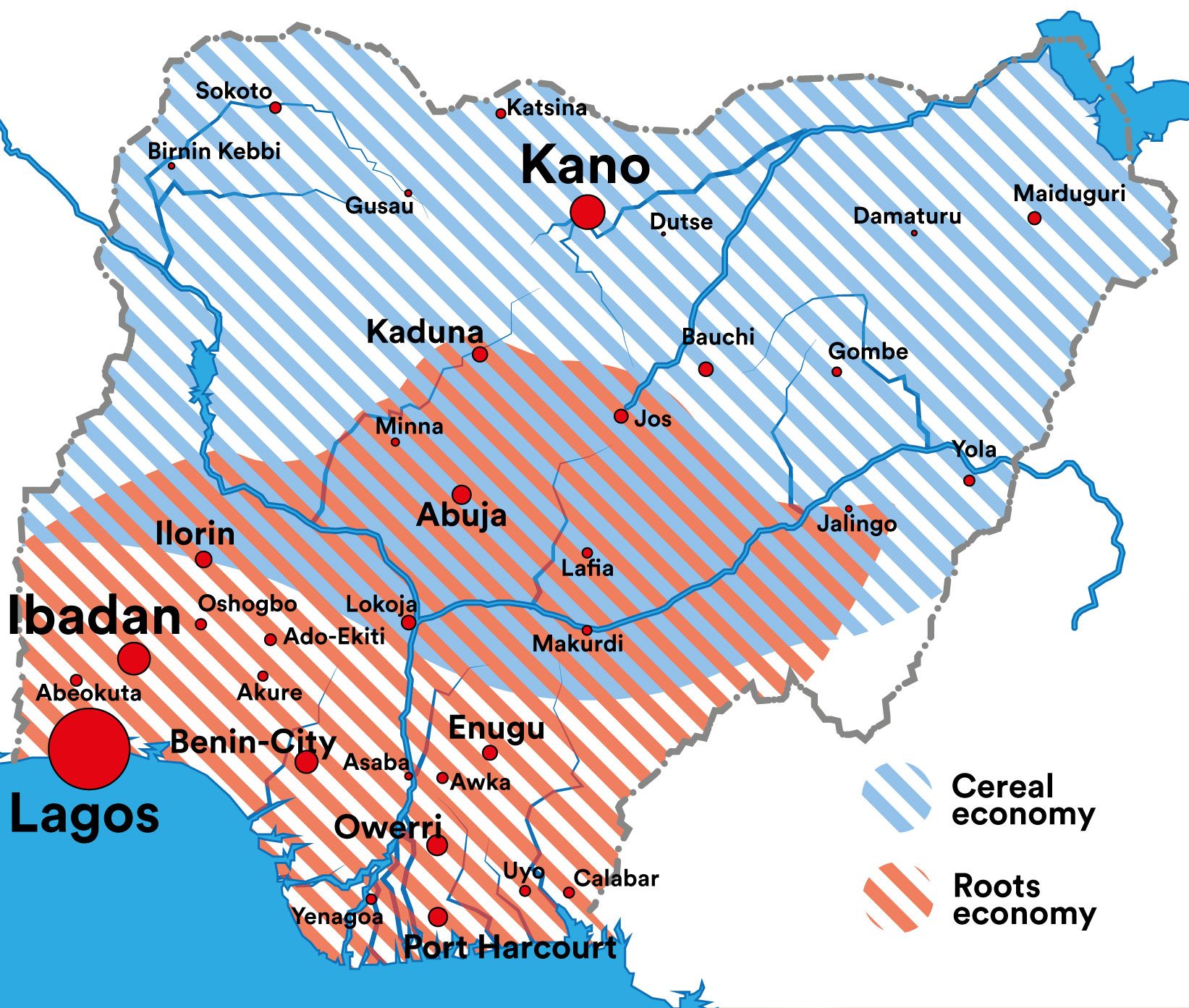
Roots economy in the South and cereal economy in the North of Nigeria

Counting by weight, this "underground food" is the largest group of food produced in Nigeria, with 118 million tonnes in 2020. This group includes yam, cassava, potatoes and sweet potatoes. These food products are cultivated mostly in the south of Nigeria ("Roots economy").

==== Cereals ====
The group of sorghum, Pearl millet etc. is the second-largest group of food produced in Nigeria, with 28.6 million tonnes in 2020. 50% or 14 million tonnes of this is sorghum. The sugar cane production adds another 1.5 million tonnes to this. Cereals are mostly cultivated in the savannah zone of the country, and on the 23rd of June Nigeria's grain market report, the International Grains Council (IGC) placed Nigeria's total 2022–23 grains production at 21.6 million tonnes, this specific figure was reviewed from the previous month's forecast which was 21.1 million, It set the production in the year 2021–22 at 21.5 million which demonstrates and proves that there is an increase in the production of grains on the 23rd of June 2022 – 2023.

==== Additional crops ====
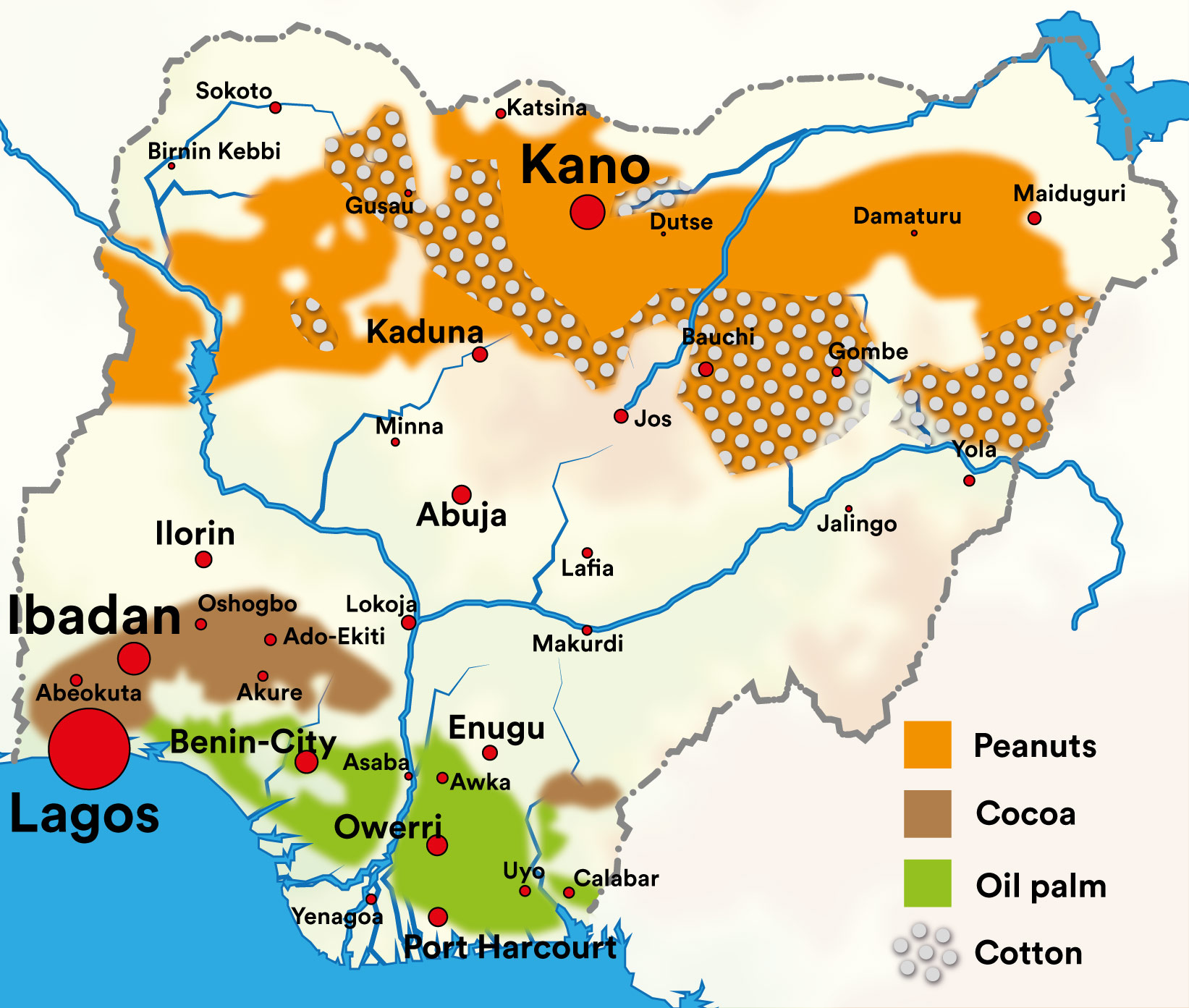
Peanut, oil palm, cocoa and cotton production in Nigeria

Further crops produced in Nigeria include rice, paddy, food oils (soybean, sunflower seed, canola and peanut), citrus fruits (tangerine, grape, lemon and lime), and cocoa. Beans, melons, pepper and vegetables are grown on chopping fields. Oil palms, rubber, and bananas are grown for export. Palm oil plays a major role in Nigeria's burgeoning personal care products industry.

=== Livestock and ===
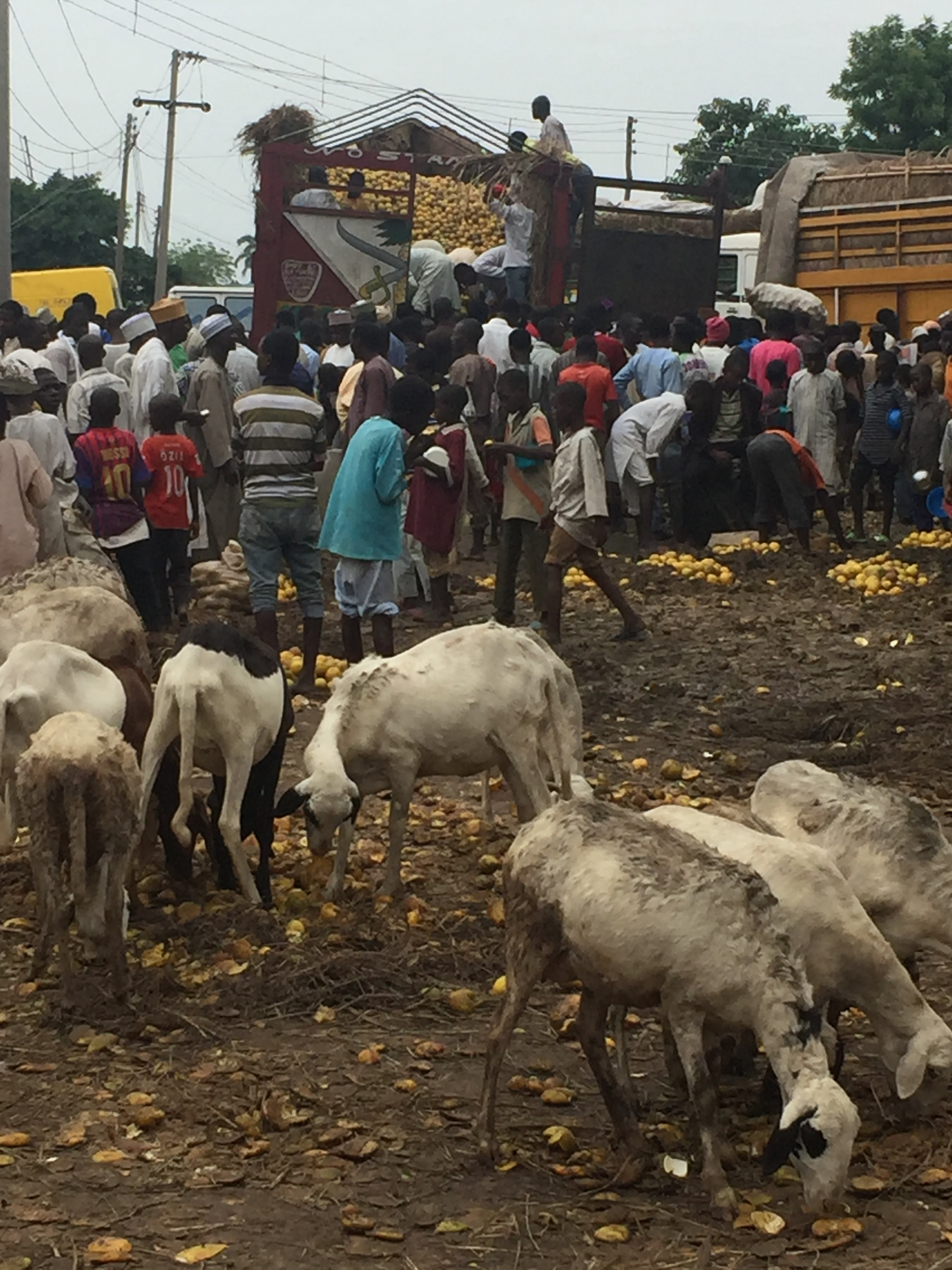
Livestock in Kano fruit market, Nigeria

In total, about 15 million head of cattle are kept. In addition, about five million pigs are kept. Small livestock such as sheep, goats and chickens are kept mainly for subsistence.

An estimated 42% of Nigerians own chicken. As a result, poultry and eggs represent a popular commodity within the food industry. 46% of the poultry is kept in an extensive / free-range system. 300 thousand tonnes of poultry meat and 650 thousand tonnes of eggs are produced annually in Nigeria (estimation).

In 2003, Nigeria recorded a fish production of 505.8 metric tons. In 2015, production stood at 1,027,000 tonnes.

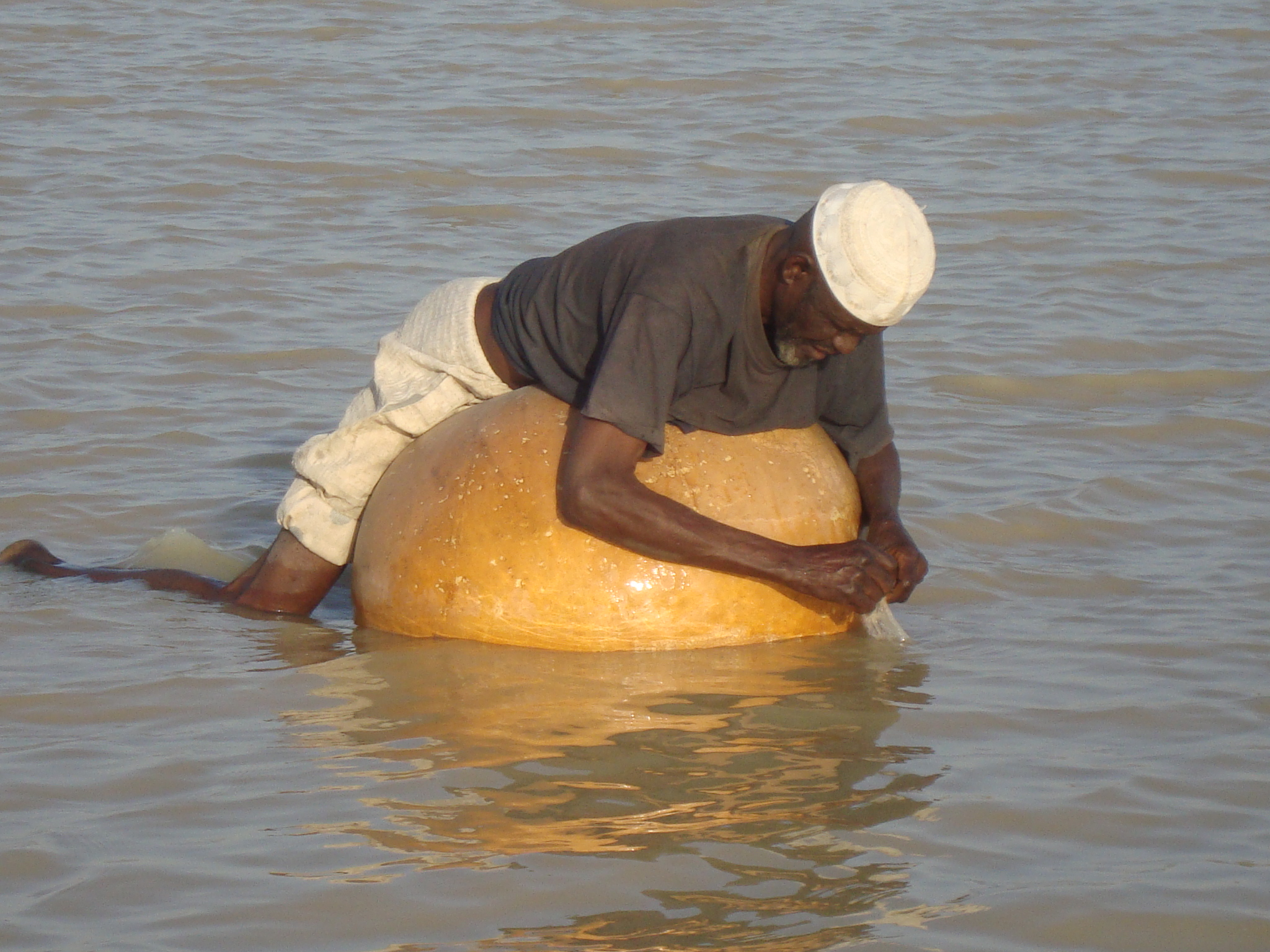
A man catching fish

=== Timber ===
Roundwood removals totaled slightly less than 70 million cubic meters, and sawn wood production was estimated at 2 million cubic meters.

The paper industry in Nigeria has a long history that dates back to the 1960s and 1970s, when the government established three integrated pulp and paper mills: the Nigerian Paper Mill in Jebba, the Nigeria Newsprint Manufacturing Company in Oku Iboku, and the Iwopin Pulp and Paper Company. These mills were meant to meet the domestic demand for paper products and reduce import dependence.

However, these mills have faced various challenges over the years, such as lack of maintenance, obsolete equipment, inadequate power supply, and scarcity of raw materials. As a result, they have either become moribund or are operating at low capacity. According to a report by allAfrica.com, only the Jebba mill still has a showing of life.

The local production of paper products in Nigeria is estimated at 265,000 metric tons per year, while the domestic demand is estimated at 3 million metric tons per annum. This means that Nigeria relies heavily on importation of paper products to meet its needs, which costs the country about N182 billion annually. Importing paper products also exposes the country to fluctuations in foreign exchange rates and international market prices.

=== Food processing ===
==== Peeling/milling ====
Until now, Nigeria exported unhusked rice but imported husked rice, the country's staple food. The rice mill in Imota, near Lagos, is expected to do the relevant processing domestically, improve the balance of trade and the labour market, and save unnecessary costs for transport and middlemen. It began operations in 2023 at low levels, and is expected to employ 250,000 people and produce 2.4 million 50-kg bags of rice annually when fully operational.

==== Coconut oil milling and refining ====
A multi-billion Naira coconut oil refinery, first of its kind in Africa started business in Akwa Ibom State. The St.Gabriel Coconut Refinery in Mkpat Enin was inaugurated in May 2022. The governor of Akwa Ibom promised to commence immediate training of indigenous hands to man the refinery, said the facility has a daily capacity to crack 1,000,000 coconuts and will employ no fewer than 3,000 direct and indirect staff. Coconut oil goes for $1,326 per barrel, according to Governor Emmanuel.

==== Dairy and meat ====
Nigeria has 19 million head of cattle, the largest number in Africa. Yet the dairy sector in Nigeria is only able to supply less than 10% of the country's demand for dairy products (as of June 2021), a gap expected to grow in line with population growth.

Fan Milk, a Danone Group company, manufacturer of popular frozen dairy and ice cream brands, unveiled its newly completed model dairy in Odeda, Ogun state, in June 2022. This dairy farm is Danone's first investment in dairy farming in sub-Saharan Africa to boost local milk production in Nigeria. Fan Milk will launch a dairy farm and training institute, leveraging the expertise of parent company Danone.

In Lekki's Free Trade Zone, the Dano Milk Factory (Arla) opened in 2022. - In 2021 farmer owned dairy co-operative Arla Foods started to build a dairy farm in Kaduna state with 200 hectares. It will keep 400 dairy cows and will have modern milking parlors and technology, also grass lands and living facilities for 25 employees.

==== Bakery, household cereals, etc. ====
Nigeria's bread sector is growing rapidly, with 72 percent dominated by small- and medium-scale bakers, according to a 2016 KPMG report. The bakery market of Nigeria is a $621 million industry.

"Fresh bread and miscellaneous bakery" is the bakery product group with the highest consumption (8.5M tonnes), which is 91% of total volume. "Fresh bread and miscellaneous bakery" exceeded the figures recorded for the second-largest product group "gingerbread, sweet biscuits and waffles" (689K tonnes), more than tenfold. The Nigerian bakery product market size is expected to show significant growth in the forecast period 2020–2026.

Primera Food in cooperation with Michael Foods started production of noodles on a big scale in Ogun state in 2022.

Kellogg's opened a production plant for her products in the Lekki Free Trade Zone in Lagos in 2022. It is the second factory Kellogg's has built in Africa.

In Jos, NASCO Foods produces biscuits and corn flakes. In 2022 they expanded their Jos factory.

== Mining and fossil fuels ==
=== Mining ===
The mining of minerals in Nigeria accounts for 0.3% of its gross domestic product. The domestic mining industry is largely underdeveloped, and minerals that it could produce domestically, such as salt or iron ore, are imported. Rights to ownership of mineral resources is held by the Federal Government of Nigeria, which grants titles for mineral exploration, mining, and sale of mineral resources.

Mining regulation is handled by the Ministry of Solid Minerals Development, which oversees the management of all mineral resources. Mining law is codified in the Federal Minerals and Mining Act of 1999.

=== Oil ===
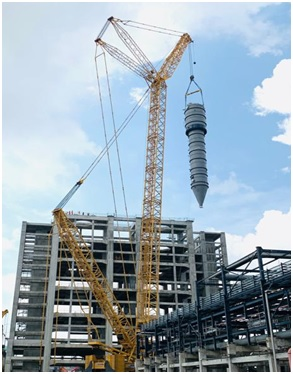
Dangote oil refinery

The types of crude oil exported by Nigeria are Bonny light oil, Forcados crude oil, Qua Ibo crude oil and Brass River crude oil. The U.S. remains Nigeria's largest buyer of crude oil, accounting for 40% of the country's total oil exports; Nigeria provides about 10% of overall U.S. oil imports and ranks as the fifth-largest source of U.S. imported oil.

The United Kingdom is Nigeria's largest trading partner followed by the United States. The stock of U.S. investment is nearly $7 billion, mostly in the energy sector. ExxonMobil and Chevron are the two largest U.S. corporations in offshore oil and gas production.

=== Natural gas pipeline Nigeria–Morocco ===
The supply of natural gas to Europe, which is threatened by the Russian invasion of Ukraine, is pushing projects to transport Nigerian natural gas via pipelines to Morocco or Algeria. In December 2022, Morocco's National Office of Hydrocarbons and Mines signed Momoranda of Understanding with Nigeria, Gambia, Guinea Bissau, Guinea, Sierra Leone, and Ghana to start building the African Atlantic Gas Pipeline through the countries.

=== Process and Industrial Developments dispute ===
Process and Industrial Developments Ltd (P&ID) entered into a 20-year contract with the Nigerian government for natural gas supply and processing. Nigeria was to provide the gas, which PI&D was to refine so that it could be used to power the Nigerian electrical grid. PI&D could keep valuable byproducts for its own use. In 2012, PI&D demanded arbitration in London, alleging that Nigeria had not supplied the agreed quantity of gas or to construct the infrastructure it had agreed to build. The arbitral tribunal awarded damages of more than £4.8 billion. The compensation was valued £8.15 billion with interest when the case was heard in London High Court in December 2022.

== Industry ==
=== Cement ===
Dangote and BUA are the dominating companies in the cement market of Nigeria. In May 2022, BUA opened a new, large-scale cement plant in Sokoto, including its own 50 MW power station.

=== Oil-based products ===
Historically, Nigeria has exported crude oil, but imported the majority of petroleum products consumed in the country. In September 2024, Dangote Oil Refinery began operations with capacity to produce 650,000 barrels (~103 m liters) of petrol per day and the potential to significantly reduce Nigeria's reliance on imported petroleum products. NNPC, Nigeria's state-owned oil firm, is the sole customer of the refinery.

=== Fertiliser and paint ===
On 3 May 2022, after years of construction, a fertiliser production plant was commissioned near Lagos that will be able to produce 3 million tonnes of fertiliser a year. With no more Russian fertiliser coming onto the world market in 2022 due to the invasion of Ukraine, Nigeria is filling a gap in the market. "The fertiliser market is a seller's market", enthused company boss Dangote at the plant's opening. "People are begging for us to sell and we are choosy about who we sell to". In June 2026, a decision was taken to expand fertiliser production from three to nine million tonnes, which is roughly equivalent to the European Union's fertiliser consumption. The expansion is being financed by the Africa Finance Corporation.

Not far from the Dangote refinery, BASF opened a factory in Lekki. BASF is mostly known for fertilisers, paints, and lacquers.

=== Bodycare products, cleaning detergents ===
The Colgate factory in the Lekki Free Trade Zone close to Lagos started to produce body care products in 2022.

=== Pharmaceutical industry ===
Nigeria hosts about 60 percent of the pharmaceutical production capacity in Africa (status 2022) and is projected to grow between $60 billion to $70 billion after COVID-19, experts say. The pharmaceutical industry in Nigeria has headroom for growth and can potentially reach $4 billion over the next 10 years. Goldstein Market Intelligence analyst forecast the Nigeria pharmaceuticals market size is set to grow at a CAGR of 9.1% over the forecast years of 2017–2030. Most large pharmaceutical companies in Nigeria are located in Lagos.

The pharmaceutical producer with the most employees in Nigeria appears to be Emzor Pharmaceutical Industries Ltd. They produce more than 140 pharmaceutical products, including painkillers, vitamins, haematinics, antimalarials, antitussives, antibiotics, anthelmintics, antihistamines, antacids and cardioprotectants.

Fidson Healthcare Plc produces painkillers, anti-allergies, blood pressure medicines, digestive aids, sleeping pills and cough syrup. May & Baker Nig. Plc produces remedies against malaria, hypertension, diabetes, depressions and pain. Swiss Pharma Nigeria produces pharmaceutical products of BAYER.

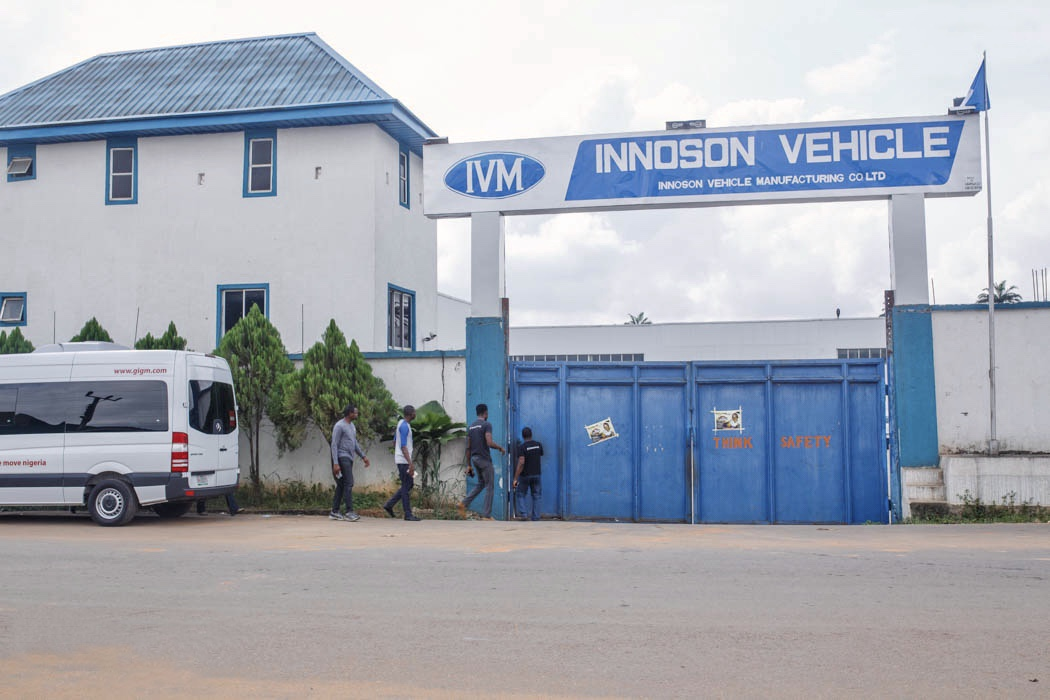
Innoson Vehicle Manufacturing in Nweri

=== Vehicle industry ===
Nigerians buy 720,000 cars per year. Of those, less than 20% of these are produced within Nigeria itself.

Indigenous manufacturers

Innoson Vehicle Manufacturing is located in Nnewi. It produces buses, SUVs and since May 2022 tricycles which are locally known as "kekes".

Nord Automobiles Ltd has two assembly plants: one in Sangotedo, where all eight models are currently assembled; a plant in Epe is still under construction. The company currently manufactures its own plastic parts and plans to add steel stamping in the future.

30 km north-east of Lagos Proforce Ltd. produces armoured vehicles. Proforce sold an unknown number of armoured vehicles to Belarus in March 2022. This is the first time that vehicles manufactured in Nigeria have been supplied to a European country.

Jet Motor Company in Epe, Lagos State, is producing Nigeria's first electric-powered delivery trucks in partnership with GIG Logistics.

In Idah, Kogi State, Electric Motor Vehicle Company manufactures electrically powered vehicles. The company is owned by Prince Mustapha Mona Audu, a Glasgow-educated computer specialist and son of a former governor. In May 2022, Audu unveiled the four-seater Adoja, which he claims is the most environmentally friendly vehicle in Nigeria.

Foreign manufacturers

The Stallion Group assembles 45,000 Volkswagen models in Lagos per annum.

Peugeot Automobiles Nigeria (PAN) operates in Kaduna. In April 2022, Peugeot left the conglomerate and Aliko Dangote bought its shares. The company name was changed to DPAN. DPAN will assemble mainly the Chinese brands Chery and Higer using pre-produced parts. A new production line, Greenfield, will increase the output to 120 cars per day.

=== Toolmaking industry ===
In Oshogbo, there is a modest toolmaking industry. Products are e.g. CNC turning machines and industrial drilling machines, but also stud bolts and flanges. Target market is the oil industry in the Niger delta.

=== Electronics ===
The most successful manufacturer of laptops in Nigeria is, by their own admission, the indigenous Zinox Technologies in Lagos.

=== Steel production ===
According to its website, Ajaokuta Steel Company Limited produces 1.3 million tonnes of steel per year. Steel plants in Katsina, Jos and Osogbo no longer appear to be active.

== Services ==
Nigeria ranks 27th worldwide and first in Africa in services output.

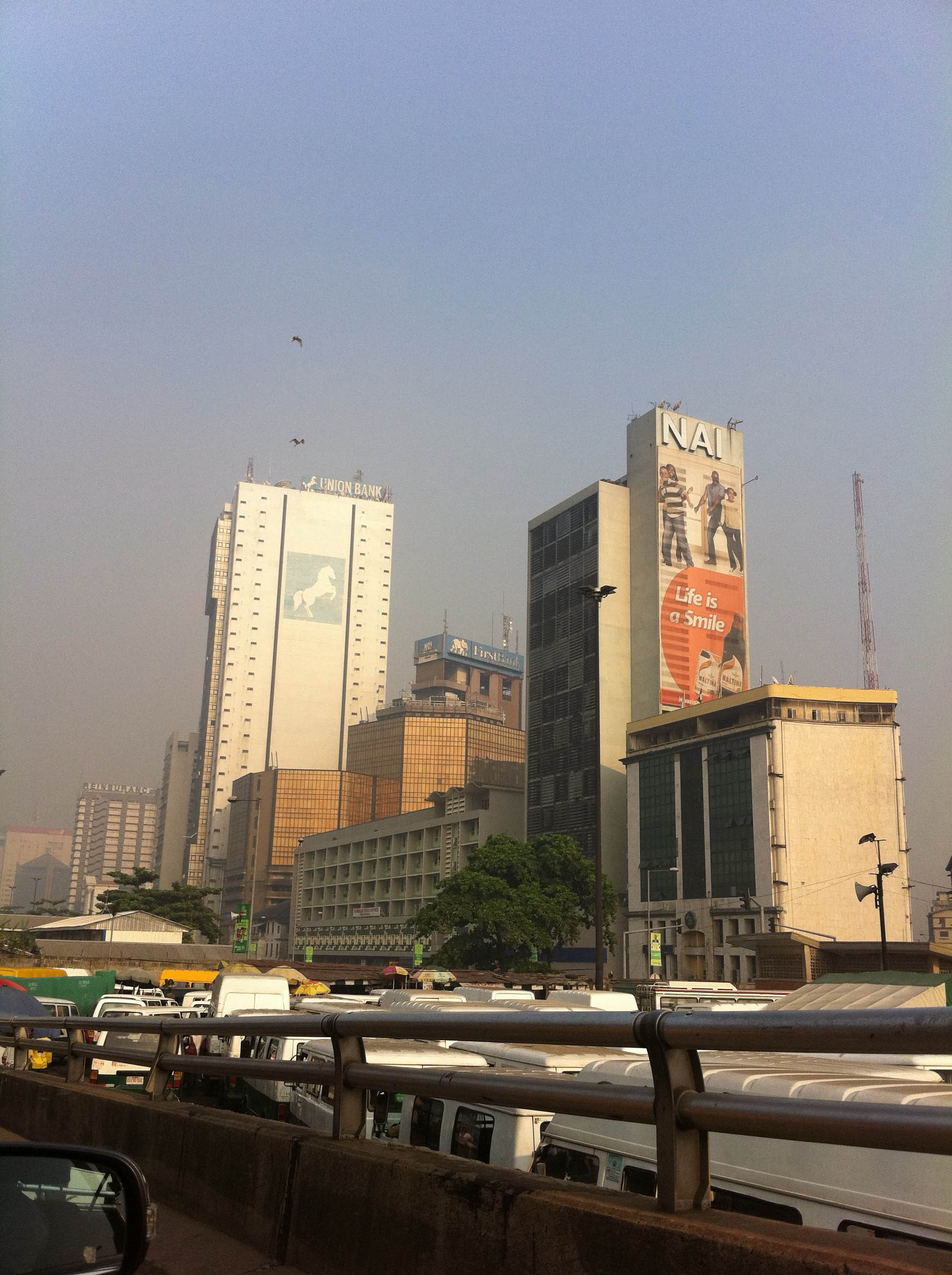
Financial district in Lagos

=== Finance sector ===
Nigeria is the largest financial market in Africa. As of November 2018, 21 commercial banks were licensed by the Central Bank of Nigeria (CBN). Nigeria has a relatively well-developed banking sector by regional standards, with regionally high level of banking penetration (44.2% vs. regional average of 17.8% for West Africa) and robust use of advanced financial instruments in the local economy. The country is also well connected to international financial markets and following the 2016–17 oil crisis, the country has seen an increasing influx of foreign capital over the past 12–18 months – capital importation in Nigeria jumped to US$6.3 billion in Q1–18 (594% yoy growth) vs. $12.3 billion for full year 2017 and $5.1 billion in 2016. However, the country is weighed down by high lending rates, which limits access to credit for smaller firms, particularly in the non-oil economy. In 2024, the country's National Assembly denied that it had proposed to strip the central bank of the power to set interest rates.

Nigeria leads the fintech sector, accounting for 28% of all fintech companies on the continent. As of January 2024, Africa has over 1,263 active fintech companies.

=== Telecommunication ===
The Nigerian Communications Commissions (NCC) said on 14 January 2022 the telecommunications sector contributed 12.45per cent to Nigeria's Gross Domestic Product (GDP). The commission through its chief executive officer (CEO), Prof Umar Garba Danbatta, during his convocation lecture, titled, "Empowering the Nigeria Youth Through Information and Communications Technology (ICT)" held at Fountain University, Osogbo, made this known. Prof Garba disclosed that the ICT sector has been consistently contributing above 10% of Nigeria's GDP for over 10 years. He noted, "Nigeria is Africa's largest ICT market with 82per cent of the continent's telecoms subscribers and 29per cent of internet usage."

Nigeria ranks 11th in the world in the absolute number of internet users and 7th in the absolute number of mobile phones.

=== Transport sector, forwarding, shipment ===
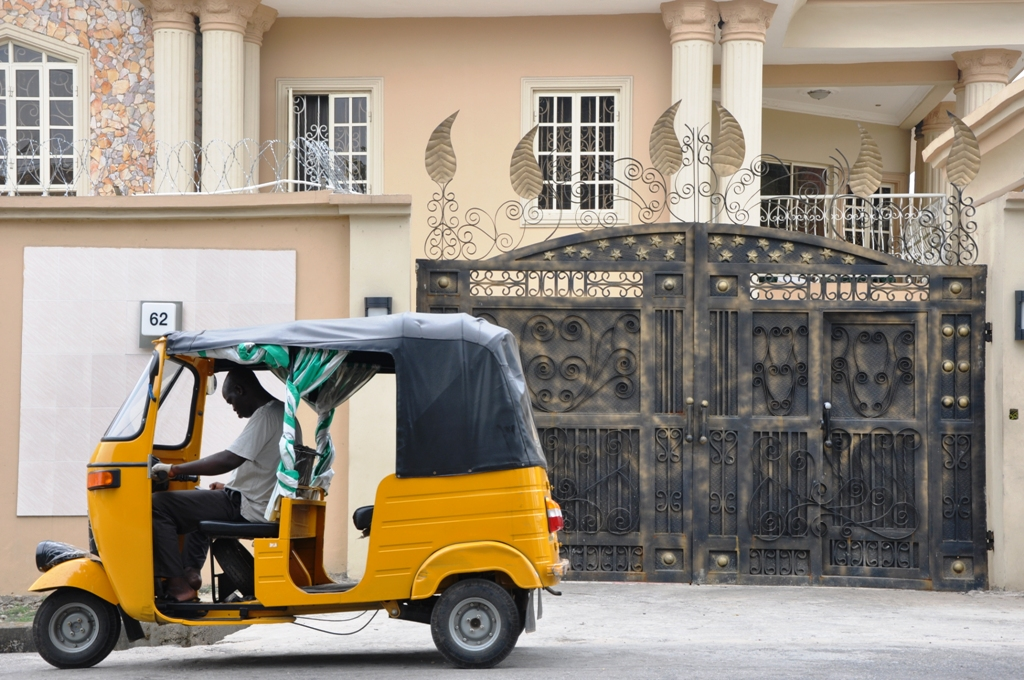
Keke in Ikeja, Lagos

Due to Nigeria's location in the centre of Africa, transport plays a major role in the national service sector.

The Buhari administration made improvements to the infrastructure after 2015. Extensive road repairs and new construction have been carried out gradually as states in particular spend their share of increased government allocations. Representative of these improvements is the Second Niger Bridge at Onitsha, which is nearly completed in May 2022.

Since 2009, Nigeria has been laying new railway tracks. These are operated by the state-owned Nigerian Railway Corporation. This has apparently generated a surplus since 2019, despite the covid epidemic.

Principal ports are at Lagos (Apapa and Tin Can Island), Port Harcourt (Onne), and Calabar. A deep seaport in Lekki, 50 km east of Lagos, is about to open in 2022.

Five of Nigeria's airports (Lagos, Kano, Port Harcourt, Enugu and Abuja) currently fly to international destinations. The new national airline, "Nigeria Air", was scheduled to start operations in mid-2022. It was suspended indefinitely in 2024.

=== Entertainment ===
==== Movie industry, Television, Streaming ====
From Nollywood, films and soaps are broadcast to the whole of Africa. Nigeria is the second largest film nation in the world after India and ahead of the US.

==== Music industry ====
Perhaps Nigeria's most famous musician is the inventor of Afrobeat, Fela Anikulapo Kuti, who gave concerts with his band "Africa 70" at the "Shrine" in Lagos. Other characteristic musical styles include Jùjú, Apala, Fuji and Sakara. In the field of pop music, Nigerian musicians living in Europe such as Sade Adu or Dr. Alban were very successful in the 1980s and 1990s. In Europe, Nneka is one of the best-known Nigerian pop musicians. One of the very few Nigerian artists living in Nigeria who has had commercial success in Europe is D'Banj. He even reached the European singles charts in summer 2012 with Oliver Twist. Wizkid reached number 1 in 2016 alongside Drake.

==== Social media ====
Nigerians are passionate users of social media. In 2021 Nigerians spent 3 hours and 41 minutes on social media in average every day. This is much higher than the global average of 2 hours 22 minutes. The number of active social media users in Nigeria increased in 2021 by 22 percent, compared with a global average increase of 13 per cent. WhatsApp and Facebook are the most used social media platforms in Nigeria.

=== Fashion ===
The Lagos Leather Fair is the largest leather fair in West Africa. Nigeria is the sixth largest leather exporter in the world, with brands such as Prada, Gucci and Louis Vuitton sourcing their goods here. Fashion journalist Waridi Schrobsdorff even puts 'Milan, Paris, Lagos' on the same level on news channel N-tv.

=== Tourism ===
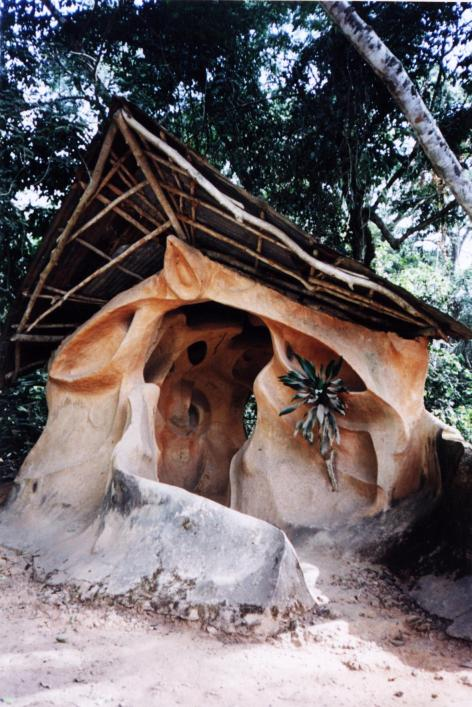
The temple of Yoruba goddess Oshun at Osun-Osogbo, an attraction for pilgrims and tourists alike

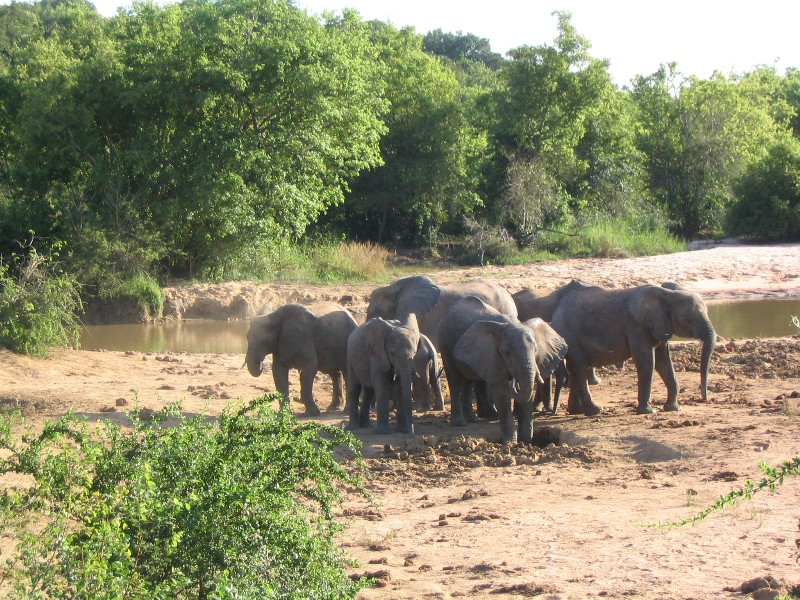
African bush elephants in Yankari National Park, Bauchi State

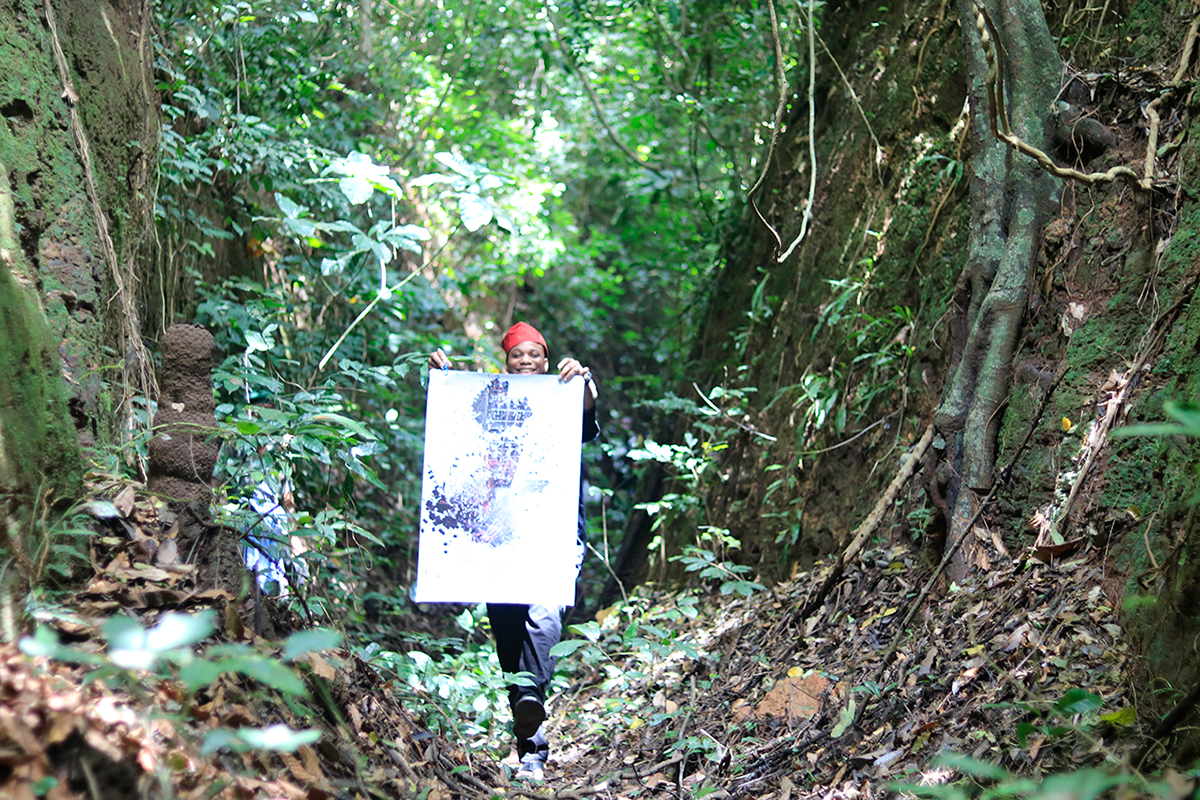
Multidisciplinary technologist Ade Olufeko inside Sungbo's Eredo in 2017

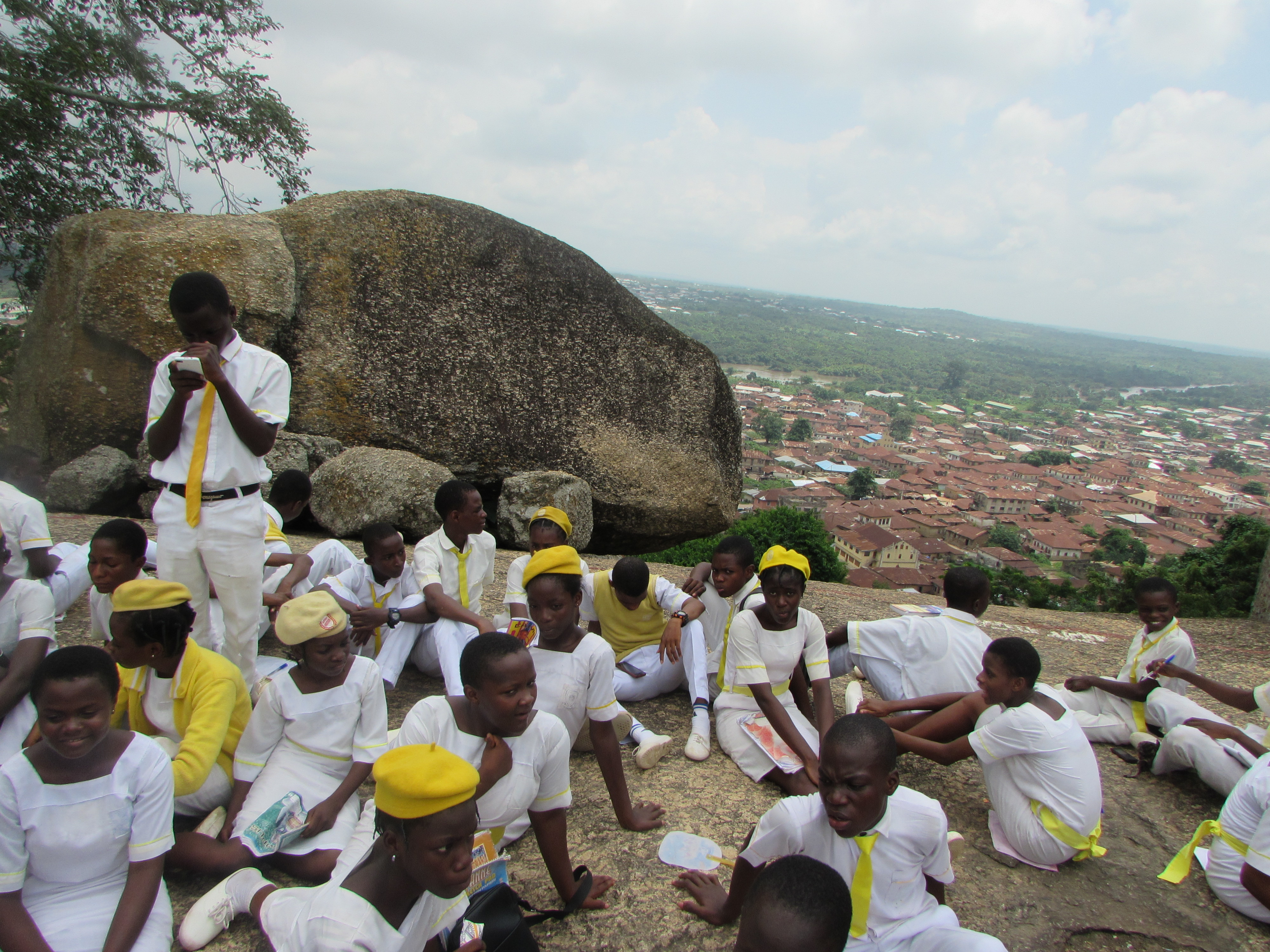
Students of the African Church on an excursion to the Olumo Rock

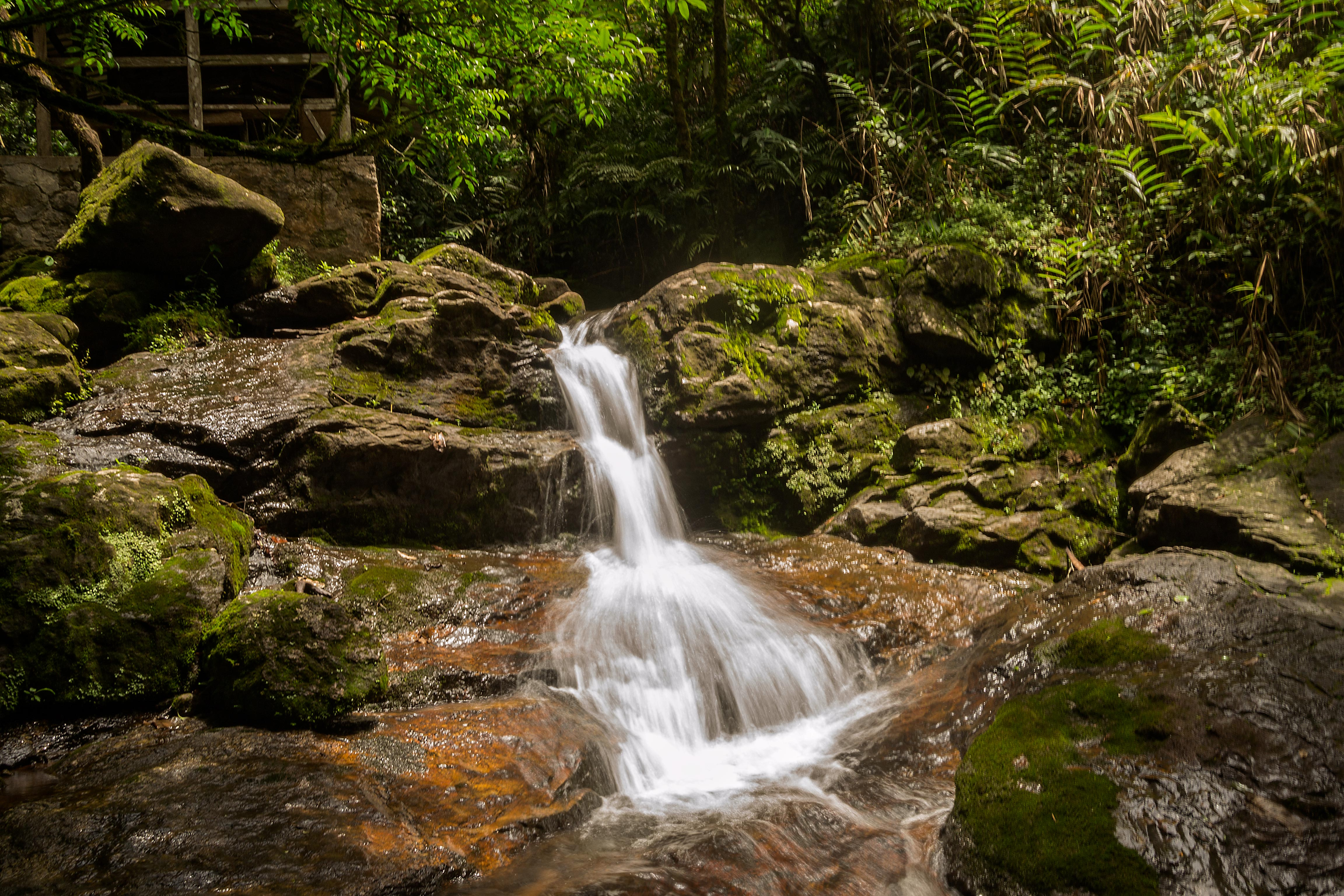
Mini waterfall at the grotto in Becheve Nature Reserve

Tourism in Nigeria remains largely untapped, despite the dramatic devaluation of the country’s currency, the naira, in 2023, its numerous attractive sights and its hospitable people. The World Travel and Tourism Council (WTTC) estimates Nigeria’s revenue from 2025 at US$7.5 billion, representing a three per cent increase compared with 2024 (in Africa, tourism grew by ten per cent over the same period). The tourism sector therefore accounts for three per cent of Nigeria’s GDP.

According to the Nigerian Tourism Development Corporation (NTDC), Nigeria recorded around 1.2 million international tourist arrivals in 2025, representing a 20 per cent increase on the previous year. This figure pales in comparison with other African countries. Kenya, for example, attracted 2.5 million tourists. Apart from ‘traditional’ tourists and business travellers, the number of Nigerians living abroad who return to their homeland for holidays and family occasions is likely to be significant among Nigeria’s visitors from overseas. In December (‘Detty December’), the influx of affluent compatriots from the international diaspora into cities such as Lagos even leads to temporarily inflated prices in the hospitality sector.

== Data ==
Electricity – production: 43.00 billion kWh (2025)

Electricity – production by source:

- fossil fuel: 77.23%
- hydro: 22.54%
- nuclear: 0%
- other (solar/renewables): 0.24%

Electricity - consumption: 34.14 billion kWh (2025)

Electricity - exports: 5.12 billion kWh (2025)

Electricity - imports: 0 kWh (2025)

Oil - production: 1.46 million barrels per day (232×10³ m^{3}/d) (2025)

Oil - consumption: 495,000 bbl/d (78,700 m^{3}/d) (2025 est.)

== Overseas remittances ==
A major source of foreign exchange earnings for Nigeria are remittances sent home by Nigerians living abroad.

According to data compiled by the World Bank and financial tracking agencies, diaspora remittance inflows into Nigeria climbed sustainably over two decades, stabilizing at $19.5 billion in 2023 and rising toward a projected $26 billion ($26.00 billion) by 2025. This high volume represents approximately 6.0% to 8.4% of the nation's nominal Gross Domestic Product (GDP), consolidating remittances as the second-largest stream of foreign currency behind petroleum receipts.

The United States represents the single largest sovereign source corridor for documented remittance capital flowing into Nigeria, followed closely by the United Kingdom, Canada, and Germany, reflecting modern immigration patterns. On the African continent, South Africa, Egypt, and regional hubs within West Africa drive the highest intra-continental inflows, while Saudi Arabia and the United Arab Emirates constitute the fastest-growing source corridors across Asia and the Gulf region.

== Labour force ==
In 2015, Nigeria had a labour force of 74 million. In 2003, the unemployment rate was 10.8% overall; by 2015, unemployment stood at 6.4%.

Since 1999, the Nigerian Labor Congress (NLC) a union umbrella organization, has called six general strikes to protest domestic fuel price increases. However, in March 2005 the government introduced legislation ending the NLC's monopoly over union organizing. In December 2005, the Nigerian Labour Congress (NLC) was lobbying for an increase in the minimum wage for federal workers. The existing minimum wage, which was introduced six years earlier but has not been adjusted since, has been whittled away by inflation to only US$42.80 per month.

According to the International Organization for Migration, the number of immigrants residing in Nigeria has more than doubled in recent decades – from 477,135 in 1991 to 971,450 in 2005. The majority of immigrants in Nigeria (74%) are from neighbouring Economic Community of West African States (ECOWAS), and that this number has increased considerably over the last decade, from 63% in 2001 to 97% in 2005.

The government has to pay a high interest rate on bonds in part because of the high fertility rate; there are many children and less savings.

=== Human capital ===
As of 2019, Nigeria's HDI (Human Development Index) is ranked 161st at 0.539. The comparative value for Sub-Saharan Africa is 0.547, 0.926 for the US, and 0.737 for the world average.

The value for the education index is 0.499, compared to the average in the US of 0.900. The expected years of schooling in Nigeria is 10.0 (16.3 in the US), while the mean years of schooling for adults over 25 years is 6.7 years (13.4 years in the US). Additionally, Nigeria is also facing a relatively high inequality, worsening the problem regarding the formation of human capital.

=== Child labour ===
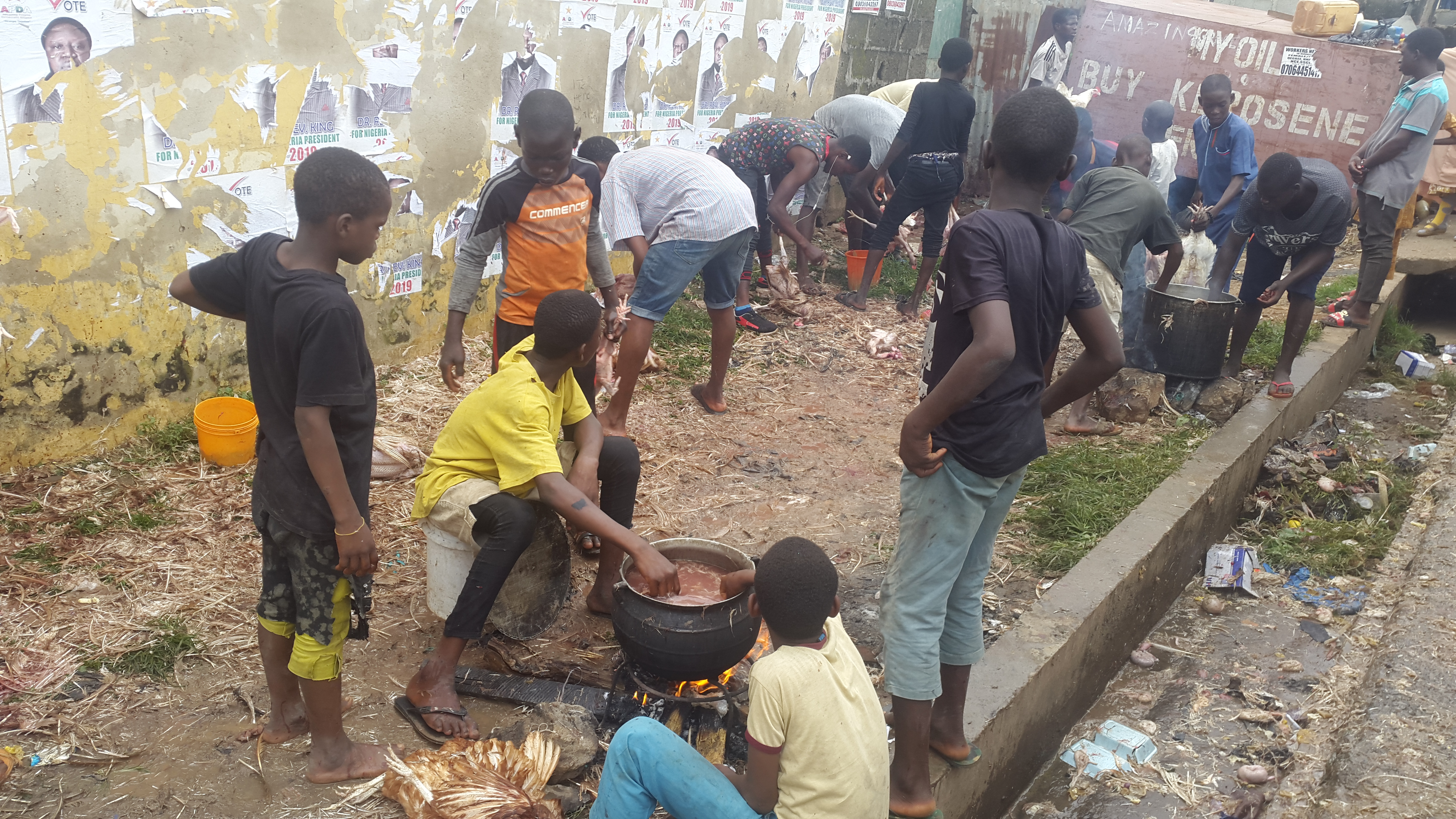
Child labour in Nigeria

Child labour in Nigeria is the employment of children under the age of 18 in a manner that restricts or prevents them from basic education and development. Child labour is pervasive in every state of the country. In 2006, the number of child workers was estimated at 15 million. Poverty is a major factor that drives child labour in Nigeria. In poor families, child labour is a major source of income for the family.Nigeria has over 62.9 million children aged 5-17, making up 30.3% of the population, according to data from the NCFLS, which surveyed 16,418 households nationwide.

About 6 million of Nigeria's children do not go to school at all. In the current conditions, these children do not have the time, energy or resources to go to school. Domestic servants were the least visible form of child labour, and often sexually harassed. Amongst informal economy and public places, street vending employed 64%. Midst informal enterprises in semipublic places, children were often observed as mechanics and bus conductors.

== Government policy ==
=== Inflation ===
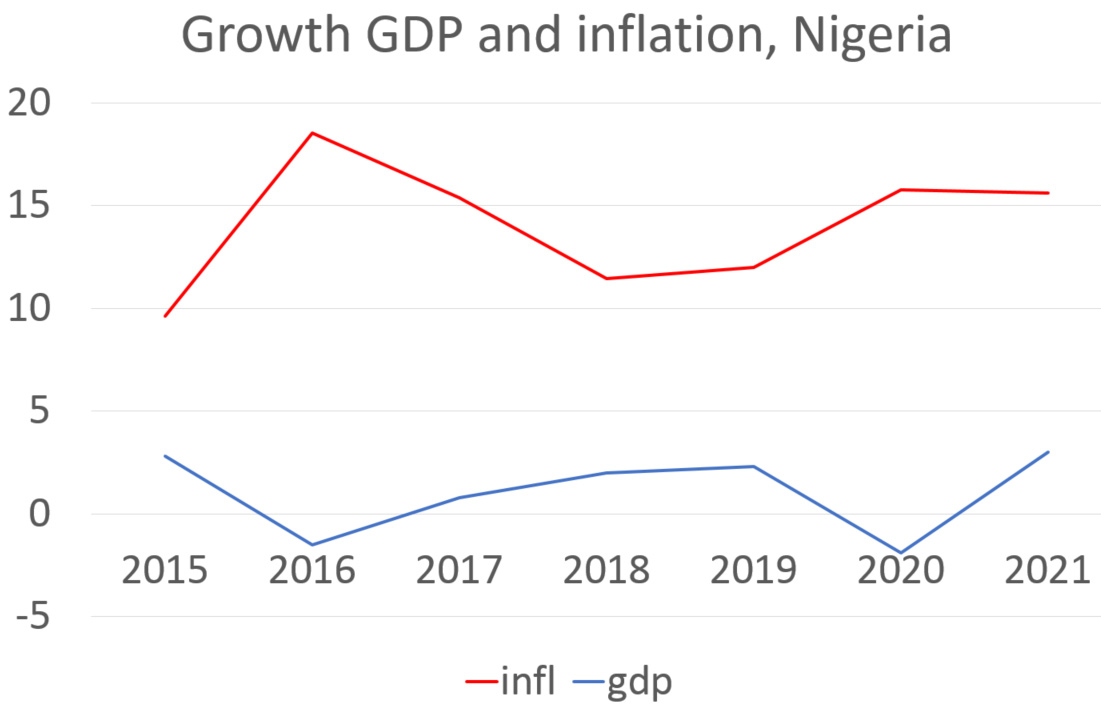
Inflation and gdp growth in Nigeria, 2015–2021, Source: National Bureau of Statistics

In 2016, the black-market exchange rate of the Naira was about 60% above the official rate. The central bank releases about $200 million each week at the official exchange rate. However, some companies cite that budgets now include a 30% "premium" to be paid to central bank officials to get dollars.

Nigeria's inflation rate rose to 15.63 per cent in December 2021 compared to 15.40 per cent in November, the National Bureau of Statistics announced on 17 January 2022. The statistics office said the prices of goods and services, measured by the Consumer Price Index, increased by 15.63 per cent in December 2021 when compared to December 2020. According to the NBS, this rise in the food index was caused by increases in prices of bread and cereals, food products, meat, fish, potatoes, yam and other tubers, soft drinks and fruits.

In 2024 President Bola Tinubu sought to increase the 2024 budget by $13.7 billion to $77.3 billion. The proposed additional funds were $7.1 billion for infrastructure projects and $6.7 billion for recurrent expenditure.

== Foreign economic relations ==
Nigeria's foreign economic relations revolve around its role in supplying the world economy with oil and natural gas, even as the country seeks to diversify its exports, harmonize tariffs in line with a potential customs union sought by the Economic Community of West African States (ECOWAS), and encourage inflows of foreign portfolio and direct investment. In October 2005, Nigeria implemented the ECOWAS common external tariff, which reduced the number of tariff bands.

Prior to this revision, tariffs constituted Nigeria's second largest source of revenue after oil exports. In 2005 Nigeria achieved a major breakthrough when it reached an agreement with the Paris Club to eliminate its bilateral debt through a combination of write-downs and buybacks. Nigeria joined the Organization of the Petroleum Exporting Countries in July 1971 and the World Trade Organization in January 1995.

If the global transition to renewable energy is completed and international demand for Nigeria's petroleum resources ceases, Nigeria will be significantly weakened. It is ranked 149 out of 156 countries in the index of Geopolitical Gains and Losses after energy transition (GeGaLo).

=== External trade ===
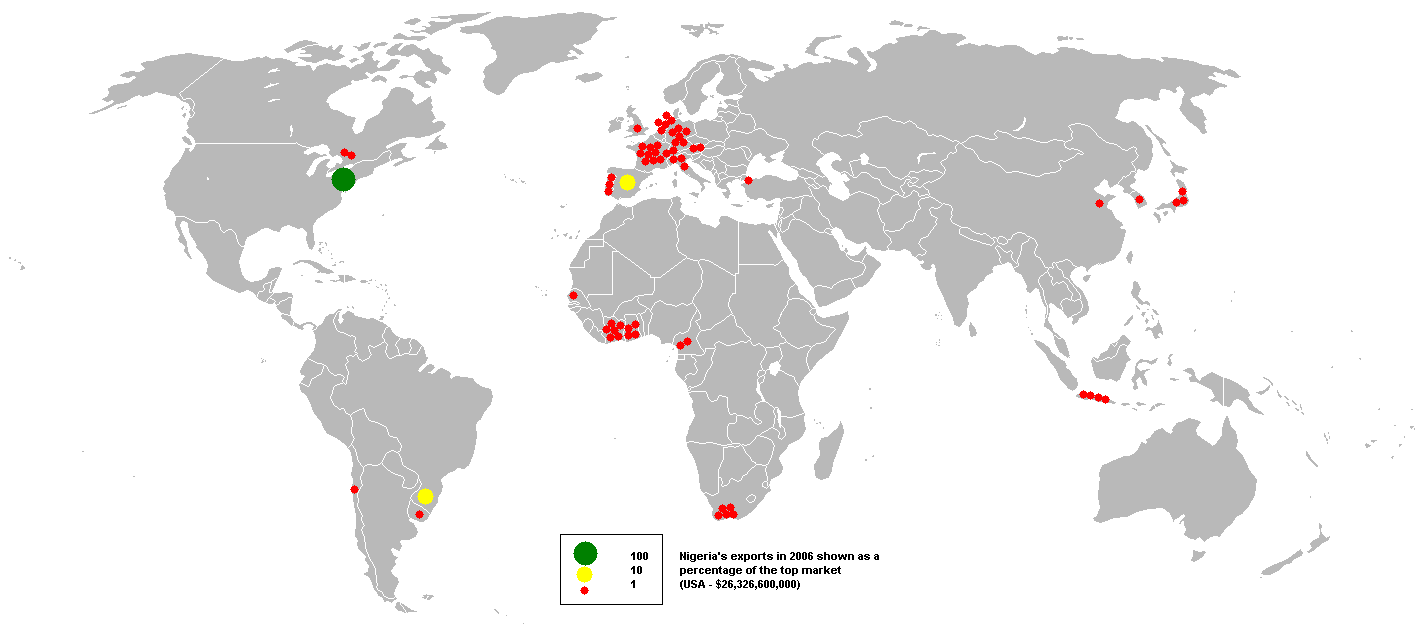
Nigeria's exports in 2006

Exports of Nigeria by product category (2019) Chemical products Transportation Machines Mineral products Plastics and rubbers Metals Foodstuffs Precious metals Textiles Instruments Animal products Vegetable products Paper goods Footwear and headwear Miscellaneous Stone and glass Wood products Animal and vegetable bi-products Animal hides Arts and antiques Weapons

In 2017, Nigeria imported about US$34.2 billion of goods. In 2017 the leading sources of imports were China (28%), the Belgium-Luxembourg (8.9%), the Netherlands (8.3%), South Korea (6.4%), the United States (6.0%) and the India (4.6%). Principal imports were manufactured goods, machinery and transport equipment, chemicals, and food and live animals.

In 2017, Nigeria exported about US$46.68 billion worth of goods. In 2017, the leading destinations for exports were India (18%), the United States (14%), Spain (9.7%), France (6.0%) and the Netherlands (4.9%). In 2017 oil accounted for 83% of merchandise exports. Natural rubber and cocoa are the country's major agricultural exports.

In 2005, Nigeria posted a US$26 billion trade surplus, corresponding to almost 20% of gross domestic product. In 2005, Nigeria achieved a positive current account balance of US$9.6 billion. The Nigerian currency is the naira (NGN). As of June 2006, the exchange rate was about US$1=NGN128.4. As of June 2019, it stands at US$1 =NGN357. In recent years, Nigeria has expanded its trade relations with other developing countries such as India. Nigeria is the largest African crude oil supplier to India – it annually exports 400,000 barrels per day (64,000 m^{3}/d) to India valued at US$10 billion annually.

India is the largest purchaser of Nigeria's oil which fulfills 20% to 25% of India's domestic oil demand. Indian oil companies are also involved in oil drilling operations in Nigeria and have plans to set up refineries there.

The trade volume between Nigeria and the United Kingdom rose by 35% from US$6.3 billion in 2010 to US$8.5 billion in 2011.

In Q1 2024, Nigeria's exports were dominated by petroleum products, including crude oil and liquefied natural gas. Major export destinations included China, India, and the Netherlands.

This period saw a notable increase in energy exports, reinforcing Nigeria's role as a key player in the global energy market. The Apapa Port in Lagos handled the bulk of these exports, showcasing the port's significance in the country's trade infrastructure.

=== Foreign trade statistics ===
Year	Goods Export (million US$)	Goods Imports (in million US$)	Net trade (in million US$)
2023	▼$55,820	▼$47,746	▲$8,075
2022	▲$64,227	▲$58,229	▲$5,998
2021	▲$46,859	▼$51,421	▼$-4,561
2020	▼$35,944	▼$52,346	▼$-16,402
2019	▲$64,978	▲$62,110	▲$2,868
2018	▲$61,221	▲$40,754	▲$20,467
2017	▲$45,817	▼$32,669	▲$13,148
2016	▼$34,701	▼$35,240	▼$-536
2015	▼$45,888	▲$52,335	▼$-6,447
2010	▲$79,618	▲$49,520	▲$30,098
2000	▲$19,132	▲$8,717	▲$10,415
1990	▼$13,585	▼$4,932	▲$8,653
1980	$25,945	14,728	▲$11,217

=== External debt ===
In 2012, Nigeria's external debt was an estimated $5.9 billion and N5.6 trillion domestic, putting total debt at $44 billion.

In April 2006, Nigeria became the first African country to fully pay off its debt owed to the Paris Club. This was structured as a debt write off of approximately $18 billion and a cash payment of approximately $12 billion.

=== Foreign investment ===
In 2012, Nigeria received a net inflow of US$85.73 billion foreign direct investment (FDI), much of which came from Nigerians in the diaspora. Most FDI is directed toward the energy and banking sectors. Any public designed to encourage inflow of foreign capital is capable of generating employment opportunities within the domestic economy. The Nigerian Enterprises Promotion (NEP) Decree of 1972 (revised in 1977) was intended to reduce foreign investment in the Nigerian economy.

The stock market capitalisation of listed companies in Nigeria was valued at $97.75 billion on 15 February 2008 by the Nigerian Stock Exchange.

=== Swiss Banks to return Abacha Stolen Funds ===
The Swiss foreign ministry says it has done all it can to ensure that funds stolen by the late Nigerian dictator Sani Abacha were used properly in his homeland. The authorities were responding to allegations that $200 million (SFr240 million) of $700 million handed back by the Swiss Banks to Nigeria had been misappropriated.

== See also ==
- Poverty in Nigeria
- Steel industry in Nigeria
- United Nations Economic Commission for Africa

== Sources ==
- Nigerian Federal government Recruitment careerwatch.ng 23 February 2020
