= Pharmaceutical industry in Nigeria =

The pharmaceutical industry in Nigeria is oligopoly, being a multi-product industry. It is characterized by a combination of Stackelberg equilibrium (Leadership/Followership), Cournot (classical) model, quasi-competitive model, for various groups of products, and generally by market price stability of the kinked demand curve model, ruling out collusion model and stackelberg disequilibrium. Concerning the investigation of the prospects of the industry to contribute to national development in terms of contribution to growth as a leading sector and promotion of self-reliance through net export earnings, findings show that the sector's prospects are poor in this respect as it is not above average for the Nigerian economy.

Desirable policy strategies required for efficient conduct and performance of the industry include better government funding of research and development through the National Institute for Pharmaceutical Research and Development in collaboration with universities, support for the establishment of professional distribution network, completion of the third phase of petrochemical project, and the need for the Raw Material Research and Development Council (RMRDC) to also focus on active pharmaceutical ingredients.

List of pharmaceutical companies operating in Nigeria:

- MeCure Industries Plc.
- Emzor Pharmaceutical Industries Limited
- Neimeth International Pharmaceuticals Plc
