= G24 =

G24 may refer to:

- G24 Anti-Materiel Rifle, used by the German Armed Forces
- Bondei language, a Bantu language of Tanzania
- Brazilian landing ship Belmonte (G24)
- Group of 24, a grouping of developing countries
- HMCS Huron (G24), a Tribal-class destroyer of the Royal Canadian Navy
- Junkers G 24, a German aircraft
