= G.L. Gaiser =

G.L. Gaiser was a German firm headquartered in Hamburg that was engaged in a large trading operation in West Africa during the latter part of the nineteenth century. The firm was founded by Gottlieb Leonhard Gaiser in 1859 and began business by operating palm kernel crushing mills. To secure raw materials for its mills, Gaiser delved into importing supplies from west Africa where it later became prominent in the export trade in Lagos between 1880 and 1900.

== History ==
In 1869, the firm partnered with another Hamburg trader John Witt to buy the Lagos operations of Wilhelm O'swald. The Gaiser and Witt partnership lasted for seven years and thereafter, John Witt left to form another trading partnership. Gaiser gradually gained influence in the trade between Lagos and Hamburg. It earned this advantage due to ownership of its own steamships to trade in palm kernels and import of gin. After the acquisition of O'swald station, the firm continued with the former's import of cowries as a form of exchange before it introduced silver coins for commercial exchange. Gaiser's use of currency gave it significant advantage until competition from the African Banking Corporation challenged its leadership.

Gaiser increased its specialization in the West Africa trade starting in 1899 after it sold its steamers to Woermann Line and sold off its oil mills in Hamburg. Further investment was then made in the Lagos market with spirits imports and exports of palm kernels. Between 1898 and 1911, the firm opened trading stations in Ibadan, Itori, Abeokuta, Osogbo, Kano and Zaria.

In 1914, the assets of G.L. Gaiser was acquired and sold by the colonial authorities after deeming it an enemy estate.
