= Isaac Benjamin Williams =

Nigerian merchant (1865–1925)

Isaac Benjamin Williams (b. 1846, d. 1925) was a key figure in the rise of Lagos (Nigeria) as a financial hub in West and Central Africa. He was a merchant in the early colonial times until 1889; he later became an innovative financier of commercial transactions secured against property, which made him one of the first trade bankers of the city. He was the first merchant in Lagos to introduce leasing, served as a role model for Candido da Rocha, and thus laid the foundations for Lagos as a financial centre.

== Youth ==
Isaac Williams was born in Aberdeen, Sierra Leone, on 28 August 1846. He moved to Lagos, along with his younger brother, Jacob Silvanus Williams (1849-1933), in January 1957.

== Trader ==
Williams began working as a trader in Lagos at a young age. The port city had experienced a rapid boom after being made a British colony in 1861. Traders such as Taiwo Olowo were successful in the import business. The Saro in Lagos (returning freed slaves from Sierra Leone) in particular served as the successful link between European producers and the Yoruba in the hinterland, which was not yet under British control. (Many Saro had Yoruba roots themselves and had a better understanding of the specific property rights in the Yoruba culture.) Lagos grew from 25,000 inhabitants in 1866 to 42,000 in 1901.

Over the decades, however, demand in the hinterland became increasingly saturated and the number of traders had risen, causing the viable profit margins to gradually decline.

After a while, Williams therefore decided to restructure his main business.

== From trader to banker and landlord ==
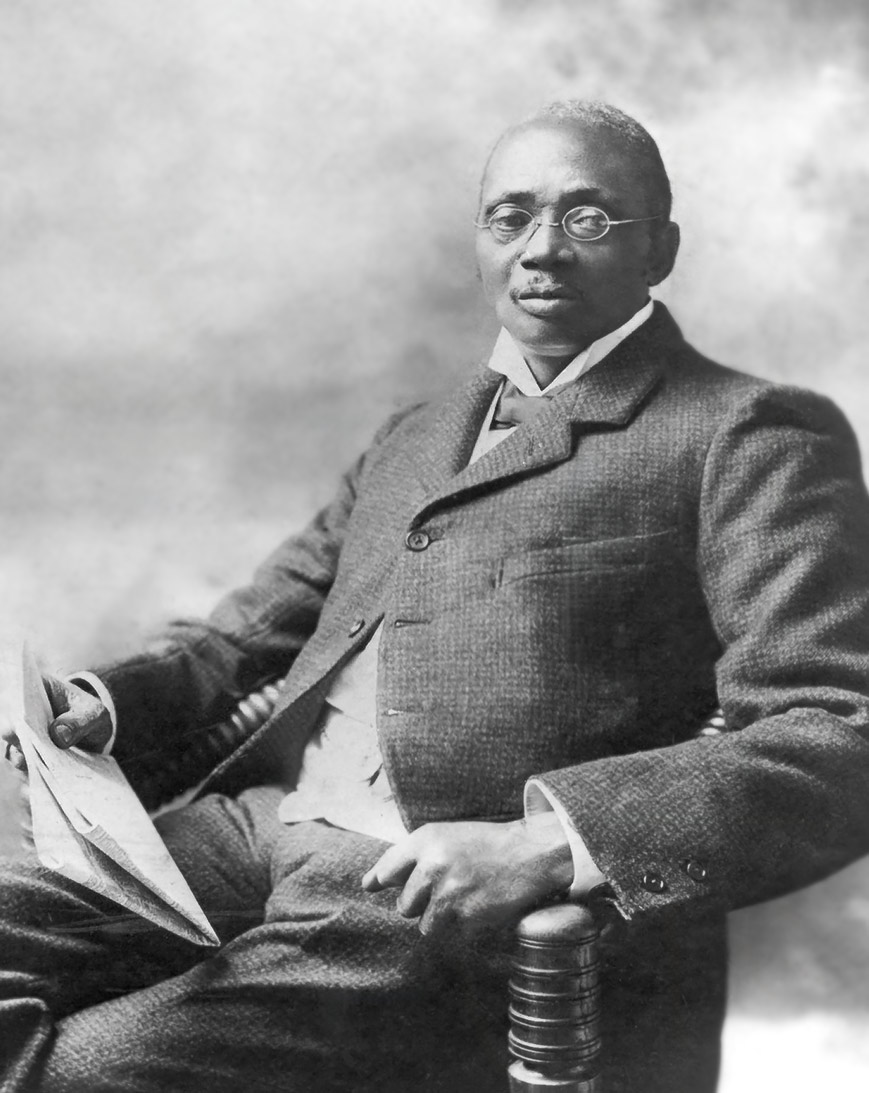
Isaac Benjamin Williams (1865 - 1925)

Williams sold his trading business to Lagos Stores in 1889, as the high margins in the import trade, which had been generated following the colonisation of Lagos in 1861, began to shrink. He subsequently became a private banker.

Population growth and commercial development greatly increased the demand for land and housing in Lagos. Williams recognised the high demand for loans and cash and granted these against crown concessions for land. Where his borrowers were unable to repay their loans, he thus became the owner of the property that had previously served as security. Over time, Williams became one of the largest landlords in Lagos.

Williams also financed other residents of Lagos and the surrounding area who shaped the economic life of the port city. In 1905, for example, Williams granted Jacob Kehinde Coker a loan secured against Rose Cottage on Marina Road to finance the Agege Planters' Union. Coker was only able to repay the loan once his cocoa plantation became profitable.

== Residence ==
Williams's company headquarters was Raymond House on the corner of Broad Street and Martin Street, on the site of which Afriland Towers now stands.

== Private life ==
Williams was married three times. His first wife was Mary Williams, who died early. His second marriage was to Jane H. Beckley. His third wife was Marion Williams, from whom he divorced, but the couple kept living with each other.

Williams died 1925 childless.

== Philanthropy ==
Williams was a generous patron of the Wesleyan Church and bequeathed three houses to it. His business was continued by his nephew Jacob Olatunde Williams. Even during his lifetime, his wife Marion had established her own trading business.

== Legacy ==
Historian A. G. Hopkins describes Williams '...not just as a merchant prince (...), but as the pioneer of the finance and property business that is so important to the economy of Lagos today.'
