= Energy in Nigeria =

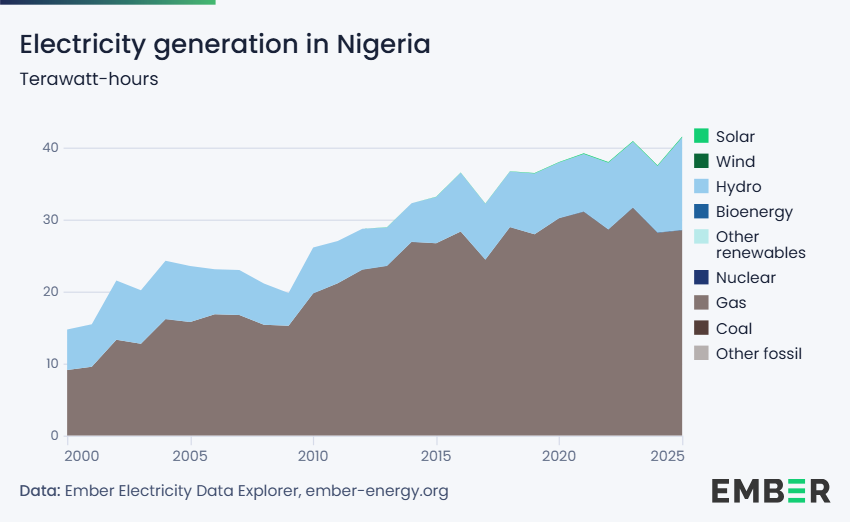
Electricity generation in Nigeria in terawatt-hours

Development of carbon dioxide emissions

In 2018, Nigeria's primary energy consumption was about 155 Mtoe. Most of the energy comes from traditional biomass and waste, which accounted for 73.5% of total primary consumption in 2018. The rest is from fossil fuels (26.4%) and hydropower.

Coal, petroleum reserves, natural gas, peat, hydroelectricity, solar and wind are major energy resources in Nigeria and the country remains a top producer of crude oil and natural gas in Africa. Its production in 2022 averaged 1.2 million barrels of oil per day (bopd), and 300 barrels per day (bpd) of condensate, making it the biggest oil producer on the continent. Nigeria has oil reserves of about 37 billion barrels and gas reserves of about 206 Tcf, ranking 10th and 8th in the world, respectively, and giving it plenty of room to further grow its hydrocarbons industry. However, Nigeria is also a member of the Organization of the Petroleum Exporting Countries (OPEC) and is frequently subject to production quotas.

According to BMC, "Nigeria is Africa's energy giant. It is the continent's most prolific oil-producing country, which, along with Libya, accounts for two-thirds of Africa's crude oil reserves. It ranks second to Algeria in natural gas. Most of Africa's bitumen and lignite reserves are found in Nigeria. In its mix of conventional energy reserves, Nigeria is simply unmatched by any other country on the African continent. It is not surprising therefore that energy export is the mainstay of the Nigerian economy and the government is targeting 90% electrification rate by 2030. Also, primary energy resources dominate the nation's industrial raw material endowment." There was a need for the country to scale up sustainable investment due to the destabilization of oil prices as a result of geopolitical risks and energy transition.

== Overview ==
Energy in Nigeria
	Population (million)	Primary energy (TWh)	Production (TWh)	Export (TWh)	Electricity (TWh)	CO_{2} emissions (Mt)
2004	128.7	1,151	2,668	1,508	13.4	47.6
2007	148.0	1,241	2,695	1,445	20.3	51.4
2008	151.3	1,293	2,638	1,343	19.1	52.4
2009	154.7	1,259	2,660	1,419	18.6	41.2
2010	158.42	1,315	3,005	1,691	21.62	45.90
2012	162.47	1,376	2,988	1,607	24.45	52.85
2012R	168.83	1,555	3,160	1,625	26.22	64.56
2013	174.00	1,554	2,973	1,415	24.52	61.00
Mtoe = 11.63 TWh. Prim. energy includes energy losses 2012R = CO_{2} calculation criteria changed, numbers updated

== Petroleum ==
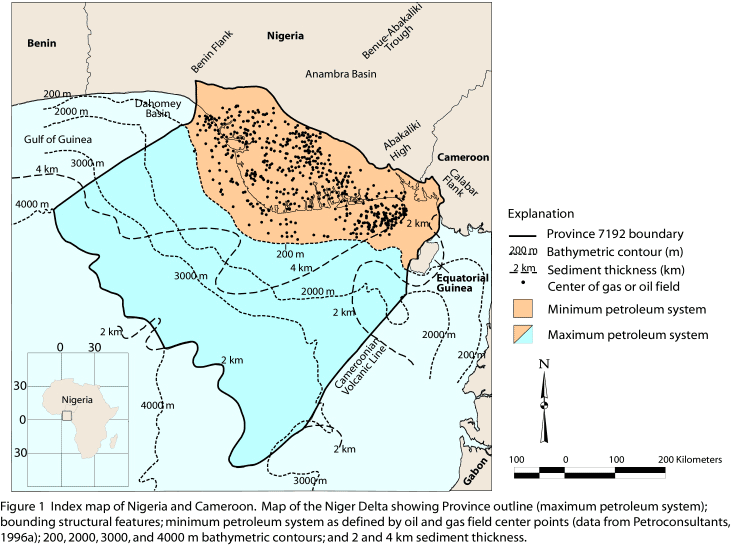
Oil and gas in Nigeria

The first oil well in Nigeria was drilled in 1958 in Oloibiri which is present day Bayelsa State. This acted as a milestone for the production of oil and gas in Nigeria and the emergence of the country as a top oil & gas producer globally. In 2022, Nigeria was still Africa's biggest oil producer and one of the largest in the world.

International Oil Companies (IOCs) like Shell, TotalEnergies, ExxonMobil, Chevron Corporation, Eni, and Equinor, have invested in Nigeria for decades and remain the biggest producing companies in the country, especially offshore. However, heavy security challenges in the Niger Delta coupled with persistent crude theft on onshore pipeline systems have steadily pushed IOCs out of onshore areas, leaving place for Nigerian independents to take over critical oil & gas assets.

Such divestments by IOCs have allowed the rise of several Nigerian Exploration and Production (E&P) companies in the Niger Delta, including Seplat Energy, Oando (Owned by Adewale Tinubu), Amni International, Conoil, First E&P, ND Western, Neconde Energy, First Hydrocarbons Nigeria and many more.

=== Ogoniland ===
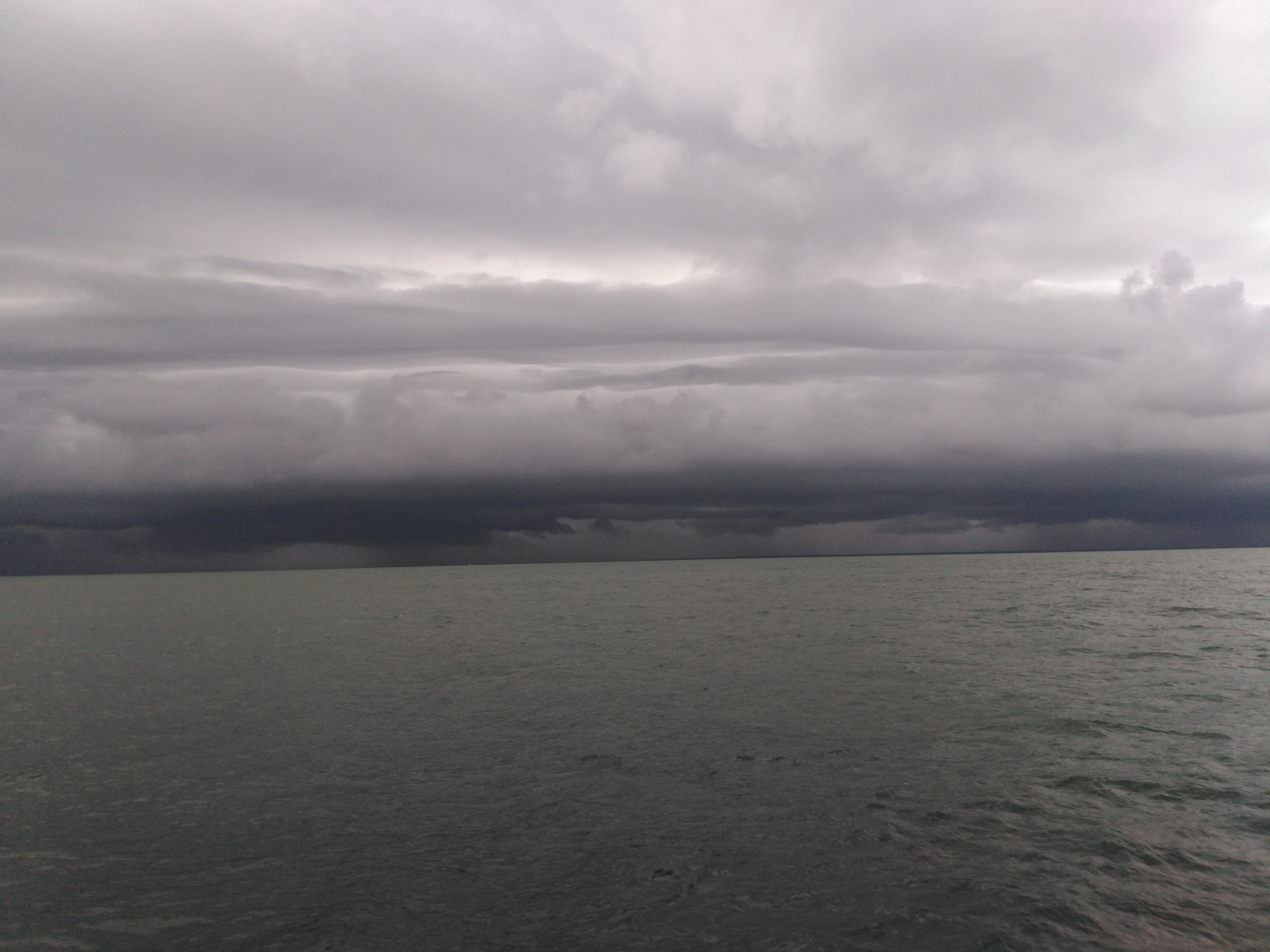
Forcados Offshore Nigeria, Shell Oil Field.

The Ogoni people live historically in the Niger Delta in the southeastern region of Nigeria.Ogoniland oil facilities are operated mainly by the Shell Petroleum Development Corporation in the upstream and the Nigerian National Petroleum Company in the downstream since the 1950s. The Ogoni campaign against Shell Oil was led by the Movement for the Survival of the Ogoni People (MOSOP). MOSOP is campaigning for the expulsion of Shell from Ogoniland.

According to a United Nations Environment Programme (UNEP) assessment in August 2011, oil contamination is widespread in the Ogoniland and oil spillage still continues even in the old oil field areas. The Ogoni people live with this pollution every day. As Ogoniland has high rainfall, delay in the cleaning of the oil spills leads to spread oil contamination in the farmlands. Oil contamination of land areas, sediments and swampland are extensive. The wetlands around Ogoniland are highly degraded and facing disintegration. Fishermen must move to less contaminated areas in search of fish. The current Ogoniland community has lived with chronic oil pollution throughout their lives. Of most immediate concern in December 2011, community members at Nisisioken Ogale are drinking water contaminated with benzene, a known carcinogen, at level over 900 times above the WHO guideline.

=== Environmental damage ===
The Niger Delta is one of the most polluted regions in the world. More oil is spilled each year than in the Gulf of Mexico in 2010. Nigerian government reports more than 7,000 spills between 1970 and 2000 and 2,000 major spillage sites.

Pollution and environmental damage of the oil industry has a serious impact on people living in the Niger Delta. The environment laws are poorly enforced. Government agencies responsible for enforcement were ineffective and, in some cases, compromised by conflicts of interest. Communities in the Niger Delta frequently had no access to vital information about the impact of the oil industry on their lives. On 1 May 2010, crude oil from a leaking oil from an offshore platform of ExxonMobil's Qua Iboe oilfield reached the shores of the Ibeno community, Akwa Ibom state.

Representatives of Anglo-Dutch oil giant Shell are appearing in a Dutch civil court to face accusations of polluting Nigerian villages in 2012. The UNEP report (2011) concludes that pollution of soil by petroleum hydrocarbons in Ogoniland is extensive inland areas, sediments and swampland.

==== Oil spills ====
- Shell Nigeria announced 40,000 barrels of the crude oil spill in Nigeria in December 2011. Bonga Field produces around 200,000 barrels a day. The spill was among the worst off the coast of Nigeria in 10 years.
- 280,000 barrels of oil were estimated spilled in 2008 in two leaks in the Bodo region in the Ogoni district in 2008. Bodo is at the epicenter of several pipelines that collect oil from nearly 100 wells. Nearly 80% of people in Bodo were fishermen dependent on clean water.

=== Human rights ===
The Niger Delta area is oil-rich.

Because of Nigeria's role as a regional power, leading oil exporter, and major contributor of troops to United Nations peacekeeping missions, foreign governments—including the United States and the United Kingdom—have been reluctant to publicly criticize Nigeria's human rights record. In 2010 the UK increased funding to £140 million in aid to Nigeria, including security sector aid, without demanding accountability for Nigerian officials and members of the security forces implicated in corrupt practices and serious human rights abuses.

== Coal ==
Coal is a fossil fuel and the remnant affected by prehistoric vegetation originally accumulated in swamps and peat bogs. It is made up of carbon, hydrogen, sulphur and nitrogen which makes it combustible. It could be used as fuel for electricity, in the production of cement, it is also used as fuel for extraction of iron from iron ore. The production of coal started in Nigeria in 1902 in Enugu where it was first discovered. Coal mines are also found in Kogi and Benue State. The Nigerian Coal corporation established in 1950 is the agency in charge of coal mining activities in Nigeria.

In the past, coal was the major source of energy for the country as it was used to power electricity plants. It was also used for locomotives that made use of coal. Nigeria has a coal reserve of 379,194,640 tons. She is ranked 44th in position of the world's total reserve of 1,139,471 million tons (MMst); with proven reserves equivalent to 1,961.4 times its annual consumption. This implies Nigeria has about 1,961 years of Coal left at current consumption levels and excluding unproven reserves.

== Gas ==
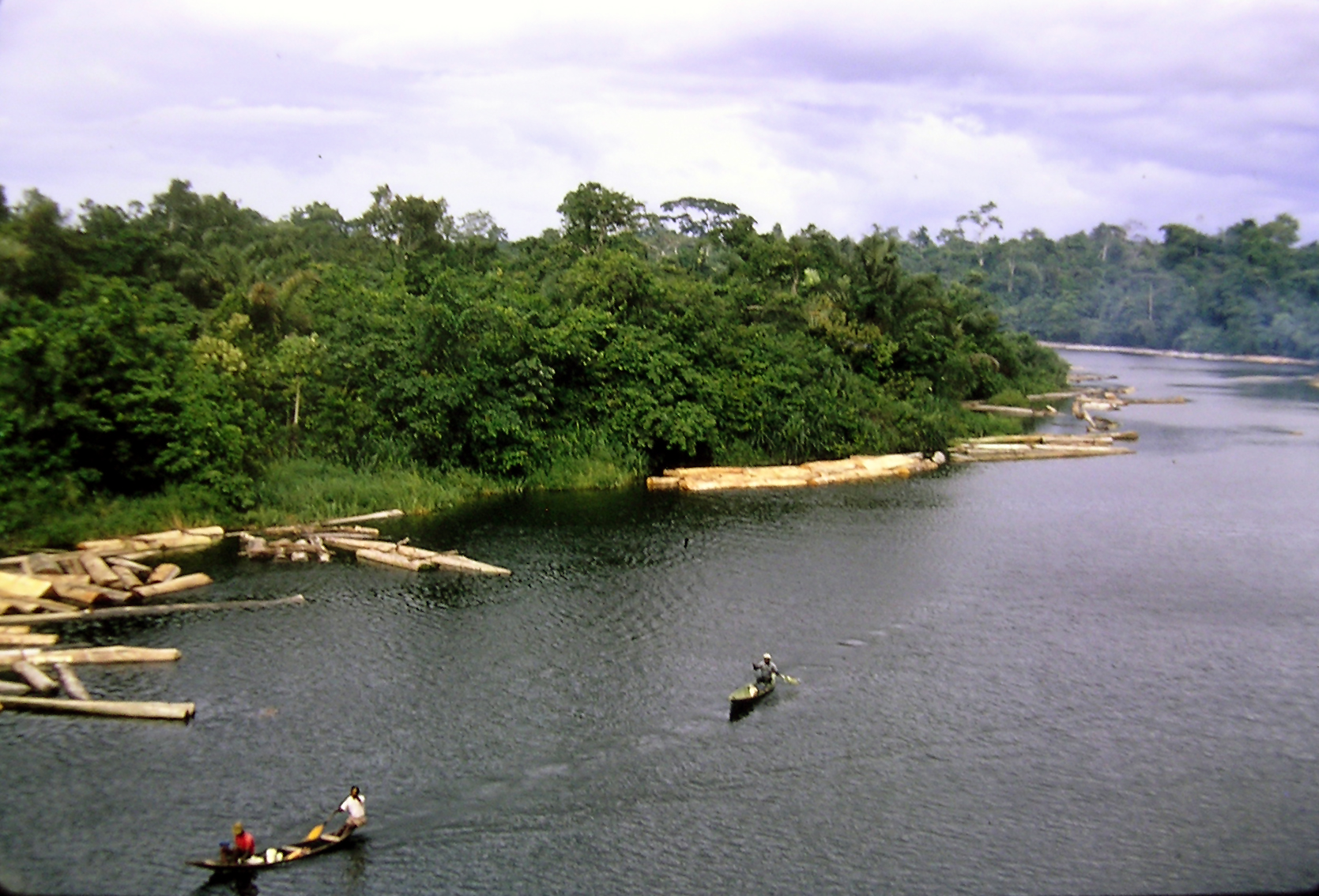
Niger Delta River

Since gas well drilling started in Nigeria in the 1950s, significant reserves of Associated Gas (AG) and Non-Associated Gas (NAG) were discovered onshore and offshore, leading to the exportation of gas as liquid natural gas (LNG) and its monetization in-country for power generation.

Gas in Nigeria is supplied to a variety of industrial users in and around Lagos and Port Harcourt. The gas originates in the Niger Delta area before it is injecting into the Escravos-Lagos Pipeline System (ELPS), whose construction and installation started on October 15, 2011. A number of major industrial users utilize this gas in captive power plants such as Guinness's Ogba and Benin breweries. It has become a cleaner and cheaper source of energy in the manufacturing sector particularly in southern Nigeria (Lagos, Rivers, Edo, cross river).

Process and Industrial Developments Ltd (P&ID) entered into a 20-year contract with the Nigerian government for natural gas supply and processing. Nigeria provided the gas, which PI&D refined so that it could be used to power the Nigerian electrical grid. PI&D could keep valuable byproducts for its own use. In 2012, PI&D demanded arbitration in London, alleging that Nigeria had not supplied the agreed quantity of gas or to construct the infrastructure it had agreed to build. The arbitral tribunal awarded damages of more than £4.8 billion. The compensation was valued £8.15 billion with interest when the case was heard in London High Court in December 2022.

== Hydropower ==
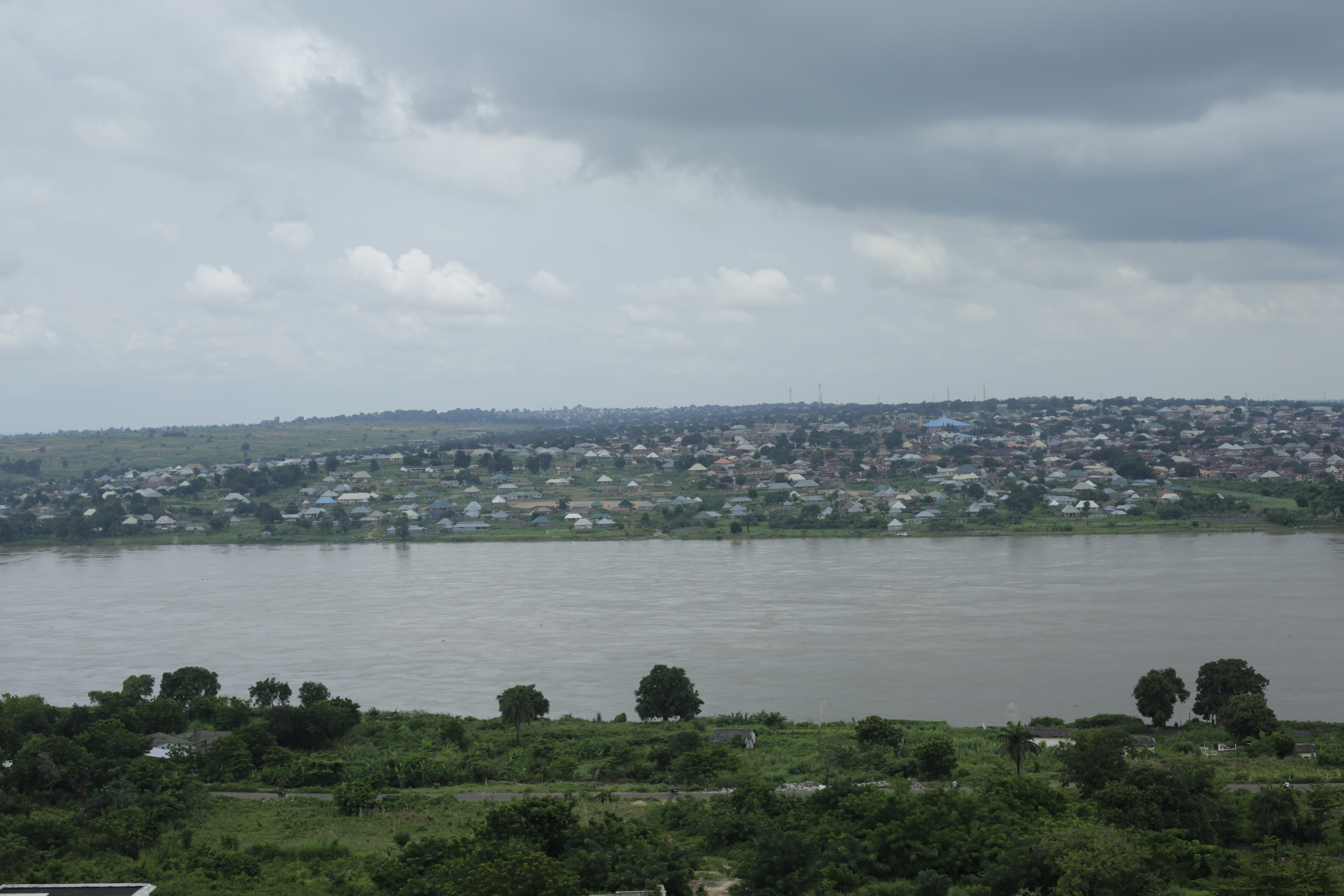
River Benue

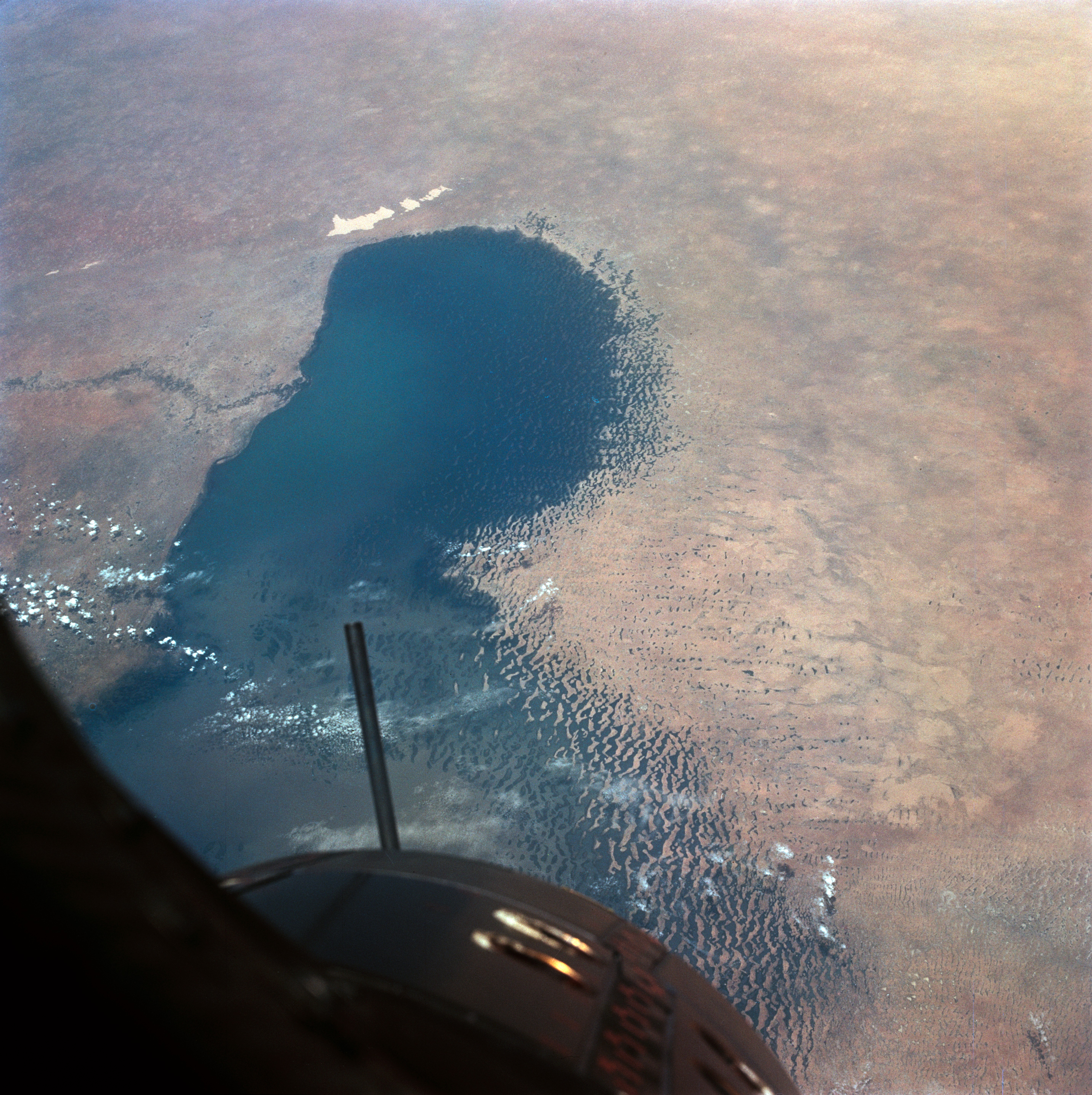
Lake Chad

The country, Nigeria, is rich in natural resources including large rivers and natural falls. Niger River, River Benue and Lake Chad Basin inclusive are the country's major water resources providing Hydropower to the country. Nigeria's hydropower total installed capacity is 12,522 Megawatts (this excludes off-grid generation which is 2,062 Megawatts). Total exploitable potential of hydropower is estimated at over 14,120 MW, which amounts to more than 50,800 GWh of electricity annually. Nearly 85 per cent of hydropower is yet to be developed, and this provides solutions in addressing existing power shortages.

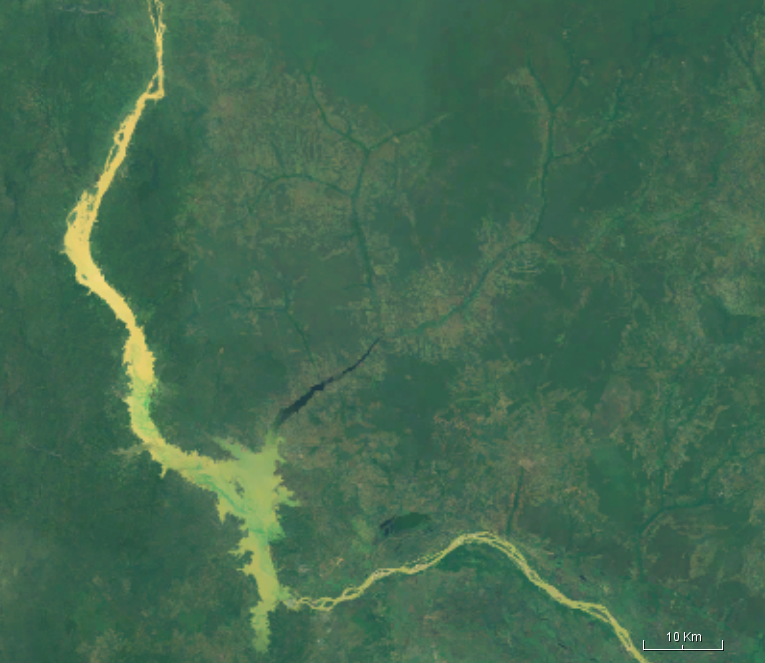
Lake Jebba

The Jebba hydropower plant has an installed capacity of 578.4MW which is located on the Niger river; also has six turbines with a capacity of 96.4MW respectively.

Mambilla Hydroelectric Power Station would be the largest power station in the country but construction is stalled.

== Nuclear ==
Since 2004 Nigeria has a Chinese-origin research reactor at Ahmadu Bello University, and has sought the support of the International Atomic Energy Agency to develop plans for up to 4,000 MWe of nuclear capacity by 2027 according to the National Program for the Deployment of Nuclear Power for Generation of Electricity. Nigeria hoped to begin construction in 2011 and start nuclear power production in 2017–2020. On 27 July 2007 Nigeria's President Umaru Yar'Adua has urged the country to embrace nuclear power in order to meet its growing energy needs. Construction has not begun but plans have not been canceled by 2016.

In April 2015, Nigeria began talks with Russia's state-owned Rosatom to collaborate on the design, construction and operation of four nuclear power plants by 2035, the first of which will be in operation by 2025. In June 2015, Nigeria selected two sites for the planned construction of the nuclear plants Neither the Nigerian government nor Rosatom would disclose the specific locations of the sites, but it is believed that the nuclear plants will be sited in Akwa Ibom State, in South-South Nigeria, and Kogi State, in the central northern part of the country. Both sites are planned to house two plants each.

In 2017, agreements were signed for the construction of the Itu nuclear power plant. In 2021, an OPEN100 reactor design was also proposed by Transcorp Energy as a way to improve access to electricity.

=== Uranium mining ===
Uranium exploration in Nigeria, started in 1973 and has been recorded in six states, which include Cross River, Adamawa, Taraba, Plateau, Bauchi and Kano. Presently, findings have shown that the deposit size and potential of uranium in Nigeria are still not sufficient to encourage resource drilling and feasibility studies.

== Renewable energy ==
Developments in solar and wind power are gradually increasing with the discovering of their high potentials and benefits for Nigeria's environment and society. Much of this growth has come from off-grid solar installations, the market for which grows at around 22% a year.

Nigeria may suffer a deterioration of its position in international affairs if the global transition to renewable energy is completed and international demand for its petroleum resources ceases. It is ranked 149 out of 156 countries in the index of Geopolitical Gains and Losses after energy transition (GeGaLo).

=== Current and future projects in renewable energy ===
Nigeria is only able to supply power to half of its population of 198 million. Currently, Nigeria generates a small amount of energy from renewable sources such as hydropower, solar, wind and biomass. In 2005, the Energy Commission of Nigeria developed the Renewable Energy Master Plan (REMP), which suggests ideas for renewable energy policies, as well as possible technologies that can be used to fulfill their goals. They are targeting to expand their energy access to 90 percent of the population by 2030 and 30 percent of their total generation to be from renewable sources.

Due to its geographic location near the equator, Nigeria has the potential to generate most of its energy through solar. Most of the big cities in Nigeria (Lagos, Abuja, Benin City, Port Harcourt, Kaduna and Kano) now power their street lighting with solar energy through state beautification projects. Low Energy Designs, a firm from the United Kingdom, was contracted to build solar powered street lights across Nigeria. This twelve-month project is expected to cover about 300 km and cost about 7 million U.S. dollars. In addition, the World Bank has lent Nigeria about 350 million to build a solar power grid by 2023 that will help generate power for hospitals, rural areas, schools and households.

In February 2018, Nigeria completed the Renewable Energy and Energy Efficiency Partnership project, which supplies about 261,938 citizens with clean renewable energy. This project was in partnership with USAID, private donors, government agencies, financial institutions and non-governmental organizations. The goal of the project was to build connections to 2.5 MW of power through off-grid and grid-connected sources, which will reduce carbon dioxide emissions by 4.5 million metric tons.

The Nigerian Energy Support Programme was developed in conjunction with the German development agency Deutsche Gesellschaft für Internationale Zusammenarbeit (GIZ) and International Finance Corporation. This involves training programs for Renewable energy systems and energy efficiency. Training is carried out by Nigeria's premier power systems trainer National Power Training Institute of Nigeria and other power trainers including the various energy research centers run by the Energy Commission of Nigeria.

Nigeria has secured financial support from Chinese lenders to start construction on their hydroelectric plant in Mambilla. The idea to create this project was originally proposed in 1972 and is finally ready to be put into action over 45 years later. Chinese lenders are providing 85% of the total 5.8 billion dollar project and Nigerian government will provide the rest of the funding. The 3,050 megawatt power plant is expected to take five years to build. The project will create four dams that measure about 50 meters in width and 150 meters in height.

=== Rural electrification project ===
Nigeria Electrification Project (NEP) is a Federal Government initiative that is private sector driven and seeks to provide electricity access to households, micro, small and medium enterprises in off-grid communities across the country through renewable power sources. NEP is being implemented by the Rural Electrification Agency (REA) in collaboration with the World Bank, AfDB, and other partners. The milestone reached by the initiative came through with the immense contribution of solar companies in Nigeria. The companies were awarded projects and it was carried out.

, the Rural Electrification Agency sought to improve healthcare service delivery via the deployment of off-grid solar systems under the project. The REA in partnership with the Nigeria Centre for Disease Control (NCDC), the National Primary Health Care Development Agency (NPHCDA) and State Governments, proposed a response to supply reliable electricity to a prioritized cohort of 100 isolation and treatment centres and 400 Primary Health Centres (PHC) by accelerating funds under the Nigeria Electrification Project.

=== Solar energy ===
Solar thermal energy has been utilized for decades in processes for cooking, food preservation, and agriculture. In 2016, President Buhari inaugurated the country's first solar power plant in Ibadan. As of December 2017, Nigeria's federal government has invested $20 million on solar projects throughout the country.

Nigeria's climate, resources, and economic and societal conditions made solar energy a suitable alternative energy source. The Northern part of Nigeria has the highest potential for solar. The North has an average solar insolation of 2200 kWh/m^2, while the southern part has 1800 kWh/m^2. In addition to adequate power outputs, solar energy would aid the country in reducing carbon emissions from fossil-fueled energy generation. Furthermore, solar power would provide a reliable and stable source of energy in both urban and other locations and could alleviate the resources-conflict associated with oil. In December 2020, the Federal Government of Nigeria partnered with an indigenous solar company, Arnergy, which at that time has brought in foreign investments worth over $9 million to boost solar electrification in Nigeria. WiSolar, a renewable energy company, founded in 2016 has also contributed to the Nigeria's solar energy landscape using its WiGo mobile application which allow users to purchase prepaid solar electricity for their homes by themselves with ease. The company aim to provide Nigerians with simplified solar solutions.

Off-grid solar capacity reached 1.15 GW in 2026, representing 96% of the country's solar capacity as residences and businesses have installed private systems to reduce reliance on the main power grid.

=== Wind power ===
Wind turbine generation is another developing energy source in Nigeria. Wind speeds in Nigeria typically range from 2–9.5 m/s. With such low wind speeds, investments and interest in wind energy have not been as high as solar power. However, wind power could be advantageous to rural and agricultural areas. Wind power would also be beneficial in the Southeast with wind power potentials higher than 4 m/s, and in the North where wind speeds reach up to 6 m/s at a 10 hub height. Initiatives such as Nigeria's National Renewable Energy Plan are beginning to set forth goals in wind turbine implementation. However, with insufficient data and its status as a relatively new technology, development overall has been slow and challenging.

== See also ==
- List of power stations in Nigeria
- Electricity sector in Nigeria
- Niger Delta conflicts
- Niger Delta shootings
- Oil megaprojects (2011)
- Renewable energy by country
- Renewable Energy Programme
