= CGC =

CGC may stand for:

== Companies ==
- CGC Japan, or Co-operative Grocer Chain Japan
- Cambridge Gliding Centre
- Canada Games Centre
- Canopy Growth Corporation, medical marijuana company in Smiths Falls, Ontario
- Capital Group Companies, an investment management organization
- Certified Guaranty Company, a grading service for the collecting industry
- CGCOC Group, a Chinese construction company
- China Geo-Engineering Corporation
- Canadian Grain Commission, Canadian government agency

== Science ==
- Cerebellar granule cell
- Clebsch-Gordan coefficient in representation theory
- Constrained geometry complex, a kind of catalyst
- Color-glass condensate, a type of matter theorized to exist in atomic nuclei traveling near the speed of light
- DARPA's Cyber Grand Challenge, a competition among completely-automatic hacking systems
- CGC, a codon for the amino acid arginine

== Other ==
- Chen Guangcheng, also known as the "Blind Lawyer", is a Chinese civil rights activist
- Commonwealth Grants Commission
- Consumer generated content, also known as Consumer generated media
- Canine Good Citizen, certification
- Conspicuous Gallantry Cross, a military decoration of the British Armed Forces
- United States Coast Guard Cutter
- Certified general contractor, a type of unlimited contractor in Florida as opposed to registered (limited)
- Board-Certified Genetic Counselor
- Camparini Gioielli Cup, a professional tennis tournament
- CB Gran Canaria, professional basketball club based in Las Palmas, Spain
