= Abuja Thermal Power Station =

Nigerian power station

- Country: Nigeria
- Location: Abuja
- Coordinates: 08°59′13″N 07°03′38″E
- Status: Under construction

Thermal power station
- Primary fuel: Natural gas

Power generation
- Nameplate capacity: 1,350 MW

Abuja Thermal Power Station is a 1,350 MW natural gas-fired thermal power plant under construction in Nigeria. The project is an NNPC (Nigerian National Petroleum Corporation) flagship power projects along the AKK corridor. This is part of the 3,600 MW (4,800,000 hp) cumulative power capacity which includes Kaduna IPP (900 MW or 1,200,000 hp) and Kano IPP (1,350 MW or 1,810,000 hp). The project will be delivered in collaboration with General Electric (GE) as the Original Equipment Manufacturer (OEM) and China Machinery and Engineering Corporation (CMEC) as the Engineering, Procurement and Construction (EPC) Contractor.

== Location ==
The power plant is located on a 547 hectares (1,350 acres) of land in the community of Dukpa, in the Gwagwalada Area Council of the city of Abuja, Nigeria's capital. Gwagwalada is located approximately 51 kilometres (32 mi), west of Abuja Federal Capital.

== Overview ==
Abuja Thermal Power Station is a collaborative effort between (a) the Nigerian National Petroleum Corporation (NNPC), which will supply the natural gas (b) the government of the United States, a donor to the project (c) General Electric Nigeria (GE Nigeria), who will supply the gas turbines and (d) a yet to be identified independent power producer. When completed, the power station is expected to produce 1,350 megawatts or 1,810,000 horsepower of electricity, which will be connected to the Nigerian national electricity grid. Its electricity will be sold to NBET and it is projected to generate $700-$800 million annually within the first 10yrs of operation, which would be about $8 billion in 10 years.

== Development ==
Natural gas to this power project is expected to be delivered via the Ajaokuta–Kaduna–Kano Natural Gas Pipeline, which was under development, as of 2020. The pipeline and the power station are intended to take advantage of the abundant natural gas sources in Nigeria's upstream petroleum operations, and use that gas for industrial and domestic purposes, to spur economic development.

In February 2020, the United States Trade and Development Agency (USTDA), donated US$1.16 million towards the development of this power station.

== See also ==
- Azura Thermal Power Station
- List of power stations in Nigeria
- List of power stations in Africa
