= ABIBA Solar Power Station =

Solar farm in Nigeria

- Country: Nigeria
- Location: Kaduna, Kaduna State
- Coordinates: 10°30′15″N 07°10′41″E
- Status: Proposed
- Construction cost: US$91.25 million
- Owner: Abiba Solar Consortium
- Operator: Abiba Solar Consortium

Solar farm
- Type: Flat-panel PV
- Site area: 150 hectares (370 acres)

Power generation
- Nameplate capacity: 50 MW (67,000 hp)
- Annual net output: 82.5 GWh

The ABIBA Solar Power Station, also Abiba Solar Farm, is a planned 50 MW (67,000 hp) solar power plant in Nigeria. The solar farm is under development by a consortium comprising Nigerian and European independent power producers (IPPs), and finance and investment firms. The off-taker of the electricity generated here is Nigerian Bulk Electricity Plc, for integration of the energy into the Nigerian electricity grid. An existing long-term power purchase agreement (PPA) governs the terms of sale and purchase of electricity between the sellers and buyers.

== Location ==
The power station would be located in the city of Kaduna, in Kaduna State, in northern Nigeria. Kaduna City is located about 221 kilometres (137 mi), north of Abuja, Nigeria's capital city.

== Overview ==
The power station is a ground-mounted solar park. The design calls for maximum generation capacity of 50 MW. Annual generation is calculated at 82.5 GWh, to be sold to the Nigerian Bulk Electricity Trading Plc, for integration into the Nigerian grid. The energy is estimated to be adequate to supply 200,000 Nigerian households.

Work involves the laying of solar panels, installation of generators, transformers, inverters and connecting electrical cables to the new onsite substation. New high voltage transmission lines will be laid to transmit the power from the solar farm to a place where the electricity will be injected into the national grid.

== Ownership ==
The table below, illustrates the shareholding in the power station, as of January 2022.

Shareholding In Abiba Solar Power Station
Rank	Shareholder	Domicile	Percentage	Notes
1	Access Infra Africa	United Arab Emirates		
2	EREN Renewable Energy	France		
3	Access Quaint Solar Nigeria Limited	Nigeria		

== Construction ==
As of January 2022, the power station was reported to be in the "permitting stage", with construction expected to begin later the same year. The cost of construction is reported to be approximately US$91.25 million.

== See also ==
- List of power stations in Nigeria
