= Omoba (disambiguation) =

Omoba, derived from the Yoruba language, meaning Child of a king, is a pre-nominal honorific used by kings in the Yoruba Kingdom and later adopted by kings in Benin Kingdom.

Omoba may also refer to:

- Omoba, Abia, a town in Isiala Ngwa South, Abia State, Nigeria
- D'Prince (born 1986), or Omoba, Nigerian singer
