= Escravos–Lagos Pipeline System =

Escravos Lagos Pipeline System

Location
- Country: Nigeria
- Direction: east–west
- Start: Escravos, Nigeria
- To: Itoki terminal, Lagos, Nigeria

General information
- Type: natural gas
- Owner: Nigerian Gas Company Limited (NGC)
- Operator: Nigerian Gas Company Limited (NGC)
- Commissioned: 1989

Technical information
- Length: 439 km (273 mi)
- Maximum discharge: 23×10^{6} m^{3}/d (800×10^{6} cu ft/d)
- Diameter: 36 in (914 mm)

The Escravos–Lagos Pipeline System (ELPS) is a natural gas pipeline built in 1989 to supply gas from Escravos region of Niger Delta area to Egbin power station near Lagos in Nigeria. Subsequent spur lines from the ELP supply Delta power plant at Ughelli, Warri Refining and Petrochemicals Company at Ekpan, Uvwie. The West African Portland Cement (WAPCO) Plants at Shagamu and Ewekoro, industries at Ikorodu, City Gate in lkeja Lagos. Since the NIPP power plants emerged, ELPS is the major gas supply artery to the power plants in Nigeria.

== Sources of gas supply to pipeline ==
- The pipeline start at Escravos Gas Plant (EGP) operated by Chevron which has 680 million cubic feet per day (19 million cubic metres per day) capacity. The EGP facilities deliver 6.1 million m^{3}/d (215 million cu ft/d) to the domestic gas market by Escravos–Lagos Pipeline. Part of 4.8 million m^{3}/d (170 million cu ft/d) is transferred from Escravos to West African Gas Pipeline.
- Odidi gas plant operated by Neconde with actual capacity 1.1 million m^{3}/d (40 million cu ft/d).
- Utorogu gas plant operated by NNPC which has capacity 10 million m^{3}/d (360 million cu ft/d), with ongoing upgrading to 14 million m^{3}/d (510 million cu ft/d).
- Oben gas plant operated by Seplat with capacity 8.5 million m^{3}/d (300 million cu ft/d).

== Technical description ==
The diameter of the main part of pipeline from Warri Gas Treatment Plant to Egbin tee at PS4 near Lagos is 36 inches (910 mm). The diameter of the section from Escravos to Warri and from Egbin Tee to Alagbado Tee at PS5 is 610 millimetres (24 in). The capacity of the pipeline is 23 million m^{3}/d (800 million cu ft/d) at standard pressure and do not meet expected gas consumption demand.

== Consumers ==
- Egbin power plant with demanded gas consumption about 360 million scf/d (290 MWh/d).
- Ihovbor power plant with demanded gas consumption about 120 million scf/d (96 MWh/d).
- Omotoscho I power plant with demanded gas consumption about 90 million scf/d (72 MWh/d).
- Omotoscho II power plant with demanded gas consumption about 120 million scf/d (96 MWh/d).
- Sapele power plant with demanded gas consumption about 120 million scf/d (96 MWh/d).

By 24 inches (610 mm) tee in Itoki:

- Olorunsogo I power plant with demanded gas consumption about 90 million scf/d (72 MWh/d).
- Olorunsogo II power plant with demanded gas consumption about 120 million scf/d (96 MWh/d).

By tee to Oben - Geregu pipeline ELPS can supply also Geregu I and II power stations and Ajaokuta steel mills. ELPS carry also a volume of 170 million scf/d (140 MWh/d) for West African Gas Pipeline.
