= China Energy Conservation and Environmental Protection Group =

Chinese State-owned Company

China Energy Conservation and Environmental Protection Group Corporation
- Trade name: CECIC
- Formerly: China Energy Conservation Investment Corporation
- Company type: state-owned enterprise
- Headquarters: Beijing, China
- Owner: Chinese Central Government

China Energy Conservation and Environmental Protection Group Corp.
- Simplified Chinese: 中国节能环保集团公司
- Traditional Chinese: 中國節能環保集團公司
Transcriptions

Alternative Chinese name
- Simplified Chinese: 中国节能
- Traditional Chinese: 中國節能
- Literal meaning: China Energy Conservation
Transcriptions

China Energy Conservation and Environmental Protection Group Corporation is a Beijing-based state-owned enterprise established in 1988 by the State Council of the People's Republic of China. Its investment portfolio is committed to promoting energy-saving and environmental protection technologies and projects.

CECIC has responsibility for 23 billion renminbi of investment in the national energy conservation fund for basic construction projects. It has promoted 13 major energy-saving measures and has completed more than 3,000 large-scale energy efficient and environmental protection projects.

The president is Xiaokang Wang.

== Business areas ==
China Energy Conservation Investment Corporation, through its subsidiaries, engages in the environmental protection, energy conservation, new and renewable energy, materials, and technology businesses. It involves in the treatment of environment, administration of water resources, production and supply of water, treatment and recycling of waste water, manufacture of anti-pollution equipment, and construction of environmental projects; power generation, and production and supply of heat, as well as manufacture of power transmission, distribution, and control equipment; manufacture of lighting devices and instruments, production of cold rolled steel strips, and manufacture of metal processing machines; hydroelectric and wind power generation, and gas supply; manufacture of new building materials, and mining and dressing of scarce and rare-earth metal ores; and manufacture of communication equipment, electronic devices, information chemical products, and equipment for public society security.

The company also provides services, such as computer software services, as well as assets management, technology venture investment, and financial and industrial services.

== Subsidiaries ==
- China Geo-Engineering Corporation
- China Ground Source Energy Industry Group Limited
- CECEP COSTIN New Materials Group Limited
- China Metal Recycling (Holdings) Limited

== See also ==
- Suntech Power
- Chint Group
