= Ajaokuta–Kaduna–Kano Natural Gas Pipeline =

Nigerian natural gas pipeline

Location
- Country: Nigeria
- Coordinates: 08°28′24″N 06°59′27″E
- Direction: South to North
- Start: Ajaokuta
- Passes through: Abuja; Kaduna
- To: Kano

General information
- Type: Natural gas pipeline
- Status: Under Construction
- Commissioned: July 2020; Completion Q1 2025 (Expected)

Technical information
- Length: 615 km (382 mi)
- Diameter: 1,016 mm (40 in)

The Ajaokuta–Kaduna–Kano Natural Gas Pipeline (AKKP) is a pipeline planned to transport natural gas from Ajaokuta, in Kogi State to Kano, in Kano State, through several states and urban centers, as part of the Trans Nigeria Gas Pipeline. Construction of the AKKP commenced in July 2020.

== Location ==
The pipeline originates in Ajaokuta and proceeds in a general northeasterly direction through Abuja Federal Territory, Kaduna, to end at Kano, a total distance of approximately 614 kilometres (382 mi).

== Background ==
This pipeline is intended to establish a connection between pipeline networks in the eastern, western and northern regions of Nigeria. The project strives to utilize the country’s abundant natural gas resources to sustainably supply gas to northern Nigeria. The development is expected to reduce the quantity of gas flared in the country's oil fields and thus improve air quality. The Nigerian National Petroleum Corporation (NNPC), announced tenders for this project in July 2013. The Cabinet of Nigeria approved the project in December 2017.

== Construction ==
The project has been divided into three phases, under a build and transfer (BT) model, in a public-private partnership (PPP) arrangement, which involves the contractor providing 100 percent of the financing. With 15 percent financing of about US$430 million already secured from international lenders, it is anticipated that closure on the remaining US$2.5 billion (85 percent) will be achieved with Chinese lenders during the second quarter of 2020.

=== First phase ===
This covers the section between Ajaokuta and Abuja, that measures 200 kilometres (124 mi). This phase is budgeted to cost US$855 million. In April 2018, the engineering, procurement and construction (EPC) contract for this phase was awarded to a consortium comprising OilServ and Oando.

=== Second phase ===
The second phase is from Abuja Gas Terminal to Kaduna Gas Terminal, a distance of 193 kilometres (120 mi), budgeted at US$835 million.

=== Third phase ===
The final phase of this pipeline measures approximately 221 kilometres (137 mi), from Kaduna to Kano and is estimated to cost US$1.2 billion. The EPC contract for the third phase was awarded to the Brentex/China Petroleum Pipeline Bureau consortium.

== Funding ==
In March 2020, the total project cost was budgeted at US$2,890,522,548.37. China Export and Credit Insurance Corporation (Sinosure) agreed to provide insurance cover for 85 percent of the total, which will be borrowed from Chinese financial institutions, to the sum of US$2,591,849,049.19. The Nigerian Gas Company (NGC) a subsidiary of the Nigerian National Petroleum Corporation (NNPC), will provide equity financing worth US$434 million (15 percent). Construction is expected to last 24 months.

== See also ==
- Abuja Thermal Power Station
- Azura Thermal Power Station
- Trans-Saharan gas pipeline
