= Isiala-Ngwa South =

- LGA
- Interactive map of Isiala-Ngwa South
- Country: Nigeria
- State: Abia State
- Capital: Omoba

Area
  - Total: 258 km^{2} (100 sq mi)

Population (2006)
  - Total: 136,650
  - Density: 530/km^{2} (1,370/sq mi)
- Time zone: UTC+1 (WAT)
- Postal code: 451
- Website: Official website

Isiala-Ngwa South is a Local Government Area of Abia State, Nigeria. Its headquarters are in the town of Omoba.

Omoba is a railway town located 22 kilometres (14 mi) away from Aba City Centre. After coal was discovered at Udi, the Eastern Railway with station in the town was built to Port Harcourt between 1913 and 1916. This railway was extended to Kaduna via Kafanchan in 1927, connecting the Eastern Railway to the Lagos–Kano Railway. The Eastern Railway was extended to its northeastern terminus of Maiduguri between 1958 and 1964.

The National Integrated Power Project [NIPP] saw the building of a sub-power station at the heart of Omoba which has improved power supply within the town in recent times.

The Clifford University Owerrinta, one of the 144 tertiary institutions owned and operated by the Seventh-day Adventist Church and the Eastern Polytechnic, Umuoko are among the tertiary education institutions in the local government.

According to the Audited Financial Statements Report for the year ended December 31, 2020, the total accrued revenue for the year amounted to ₦1,909,470,171.11. Over 63.70% of this amount, that is, ₦1,216,755,647.97 was realized as statutory revenue from Federal Accounts Allocation Committee (FAAC). A sum of ₦471,564,524.20 was internally generated. This amount constituted about 24.70% of the total accrued revenue. A sum of N10,206,459.83 represents Value Added Tax. This amount constituted about 0.54% of the total accrued revenue and other capital receipts of N200,235,294.12 representing 10.50%. The remaining 0.56% was Transfer from Consolidated Revenue Fund, which amounted to ₦10,708,244.99.

Total expenditure incurred during the year amounted to ₦2,038,246,642.26.This comprises ₦738,441,232.13 for Salary and ₦42,982,267.66 for Over Head; and N1,256,823,142.47 being Transfer Payments to Govt. Establishments.

It has an area of 258 km^{2} and a population of 134,762 based on the 2006 census. The first executive chairman is Chief Damian Ozurumba.

The postal code of the area is 451.

== Climate ==
Isiala-Ngwa South LGA experiences a tropical monsoon climate (Köppen: Am). This climate is characterized by a distinct wet season and dry season.

=== Temperature ===
The area experiences relatively high temperatures throughout the year. Average daily temperatures range from about 24 °C (75 °F) to 32 °C (90 °F). The hottest months are typically February to April, just before the onset of the rainy season.

=== Rainfall ===
Isiala-Ngwa South receives significant rainfall, with an annual average of approximately 2,000 to 2,500 millimetres (78 to 98 inches). The wet season generally runs from April to October, with peak rainfall occurring between June and September. The dry season lasts from November to March, with December and January being the driest months.

=== Humidity ===
Relative humidity is high throughout the year, often exceeding 80% during the rainy season. It may drop to around 60–70% during the dry season, particularly in the Harmattan period.

=== Seasons ===
The climate can be divided into four seasons:

- Long rainy season (April to July)
- Short dry season (August)
- Short rainy season (September to October)
- Long dry season (November to March)

The long dry season is influenced by the Harmattan, a dry and dusty wind that blows from the Sahara Desert.

=== Climate change impacts ===
In recent years, like many parts of Nigeria, Isiala-Ngwa South has experienced some effects of climate change, including more erratic rainfall patterns and increased frequency of extreme weather events. However, more research is needed to quantify these changes specifically for this local government area.

== List of Towns and Villages ==
=== Ovu-Ngwu ===
- Agbaragwu
- Amaede
- Eke-na-Ekpu
- Iheneriala
- Ngwama
- Okpungwu
- Umuaja
- Umuakpor
- Umuapu I
- Umuapu II
- Umuejije
- Umuihi
- Umuotiri
- Umuukuru

=== Osokwa – Nvosi ===
- Umuetegha
- Iheoji
- Ikem
- Mgbogbo-Ndiolumbe
- Nkpuruta-Ndiolumbe
- Ntigha
- Ogele-Ukwu
- Umuabali
- Umuada
- Umuhu
- Umuezu

=== Isiala Nvosi ===
- Amaku
- Kputuke
- Eziama
- Mgbokonta
- Obuba
- Ohuhu Ekwuru
- Umuawuru
- Umuofa
- Umuejea
- Umunevo
- Umunko
- Umunkpeyi
- Umunwanbi
- Umuobefu
- Umuogele
- Umuokiri
- Umuomacha
- Umungalagu

=== Ehi-Na-Uguru Nvosi ===
- Amaiyi
- Ebeyi
- Umuehim
- Umuguru
- Umuokpogho

=== Ovu-Okwu ===
- Amauha
- Obikwesu
- Okpuala
- Ovorji
- Umiri
- Umuakwa
- Umuegoro
- Umueleghele
- Umuene
- Umuowa
- Umurasi
- Umuopia

=== Omoba ===
- Umugba
- Umuagu
- Umuamosi
- Umuzoechi
- Umuikea
- Umuire
- Umuokoroukwu
- Umuoleihe
- Umuokegwu

=== Okporo Ahaba ===
- Amuke
- Mba
- Mbutu Umuoke
- Okpuhie
- Umuajuju
- Umuakuma
- Umuenere
- Umuhie
- Umuoko

=== Mbutu ===
- Amankwo
- Egbelu-Mbutu/Umuokere
- Obekwesu
- Okungwu
- Owerrinta
- Uhum
- Umogwu
- Umuduru
- Umuekwe
- Umueleke
- Umuezeocha
- Umuichi
- Umuocheala-Umuokorie
- Umuojima Efene
- Umuojima-Ukwu
- Umuokwu Umuagu
- Umuosisi
- Umuosoala
- Waterside

=== Amaise-Ahaba ===
- Mgbedeala
- Nkpuka
- Umuacha
- Umuikaa
- Umuvo

=== Ngwa Obi ===
- Amaudara
- Umuala
- Umuebi
- Umuezeoji
- Umundogu
- Umunta
- Umuokoro
- Umulelu
- Umuaro
- Umuekegwu
- Nbutu

=== Amaise ===
- Aga
- Amaokpu
- Nneoyi
- Umuekene
- Umunwanda

== See also ==
- List of villages in Abia State
