= Ihovbor Power Plant =

Power plant in Benin, Edo, Nigeria

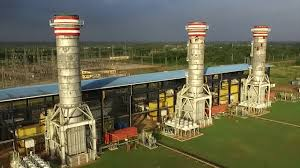
- Country: Nigeria
- Location: Benin, Edo
- Coordinates: 6°24′24.4″N 5°40′57.3″E
- Construction began: 2006
- Commission date: May 2013

Thermal power station
- Primary fuel: Natural gas

Power generation
- Units operational: 4
- Nameplate capacity: 450 MW (610,000 PS; 600,000 hp)

The Ihovbor Power Plant is a gas-fired power plant in Benin City, Edo State, Nigeria.

== History ==
The plan to establish the power plant began in 2005. The construction then started in 2006. The power plant was commissioned in May 2013.

== Technical specifications ==
The power plant consists of four generation unit of 112.5 MW (153,000 PS; 150,900 hp) with a total installed capacity of 450 MW (610,000 PS; 600,000 hp).

== See also ==
- Energy in Nigeria
- List of power stations in Nigeria
