= Alliance Federated Energy =

Alliance Federated Energy (AFE) is headquartered in Milwaukee, Wisconsin. Its principal business is to develop, build, own, and operate energy and environmental infrastructure projects with a focus on renewable and environmentally sustainable technologies.

AFE is managed by a team of industry veterans with significant experience in developing, operating, and financing energy-related businesses and projects around the globe. Collectively, the team has developed and/or financed over a dozen power generation projects over the past 30 years, including simple and combined cycle combustion turbines, pulverized coal, waste coal, waste-to-energy, wind, and liquefied natural gas facilities.

== Current projects ==
AFE is currently engaged in the development of "Project Apollo", a waste-to-energy project located in the Midwest. The facility will utilize advanced and environmentally sustainable plasma gasification technology to process municipal and industrial wastes into clean energy and reusable by-products.
