= List of natural gas processing plants in Nigeria =

This is a list of natural gas processing plants in Nigeria.

Capacity data at standard conditions. (10^{6} ft^{3}/d is million cubic feet per day. 10^{6} m^{3}/d is million cubic metres per day.)

Gas plant	OML number / operator	Capacity (AS/NAS) 10^{6} ft^{3}/d	Capacity 10^{6} m^{3}/d	Capacity ref.	Pipeline connections (domestic)	Pipeline connections (export)	Additional description
Alakiri	OML 18/ Eroton Exploration and Production Co Ltd	120	3.4		Domestic - Alakiri to Onne Gas pipeline, Alakiri -Obigbo North -lkot Abasi pipeline		
Bonga FPSO (Floating Production Storage and Offloading vessel)	OML 118 /Shell	105	3.0			Export - LNG Plant in Bonny	offshore
Bonny	OML 11 /Shell	450	13			Export - LNG Plant in Bonny	
Oben	OML 4 /Seplat	300	8.5		Domestic - Oben-Geregu pipeline, Escravos–Lagos Pipeline System		
Obiafu-Obrikom (Ob-Ob)	OML 60,61,62,63 / Oando	1,000	28		Domestic - 70 million ft^{3}/d supplying Okpai power plant	Export - LNG Plant in Bonny	
Obite	OML 58 / Total	370	10			Export - LNG Plant in Bonny	
Odidi	OML 42 / Neconde	40	1.1				
Ogbele	OML 54 / Niger Delta Exploration and Production Plc	100	2.8			Export - LNG Plant in Bonny	
Oredo	OML 111 / NPDC	65	1.8		Domestic - Escravos–Lagos Pipeline System/Ihovbor Power Plant		
Ovade-Ogharefe	OML 98 / Pan Ocean Oil Corporation	130	3.7		Domestic - Escravos–Lagos Pipeline System		
Gbaran Ubie	OML 28 / Shell	1,000	28		Domestic - planned 60 million ft^{3}/d for 225 MW NIPP power plant in Gbaran	Export - LNG Plant in Bonny	
Obigbo	OML 17 / NPDC	60	1.7	Carbon Credit Development for Flare (PDF)	Domestic - Obigbo North -lkot Abasi Pipeline, Northern Option Pipeline		
Okoloma	OML 28 / Shell	240	6.8		Domestic - Afam VI power plant (120 million ft^{3}/d)		
Soku	OML 23 / Shell	1,100	31			Export - LNG Plant in Bonny	
UQUO	OML 13 / SEPTA ENERGY	200	5.7		Domestic - Ibom power plant, NIPP Calabar power plant (planned)		
Ughelli East	OML 34 /NPDC	90	2.5		Domestic - Delta (Ughelli) power plant		
Utorogu	OML 34 /NPDC	360	10		Domestic - Escravos–Lagos Pipeline System	Part of 170 million ft^{3}/d WAGP	
Escravos - EGP	OML 140 / CHEVRON	630	18		Domestic - 215 million ft^{3}/d Escravos–Lagos Pipeline System	Export - 325 million ft^{3}/d Escravos Gas to Liquids (EGTL), part of 170 million ft^{3}/d WAGP	
