= Ibom Power Plant =

Nigerian nuclear power plant

Coordinates: 4°33′53″N 7°34′06″E

Ibom Power Company Limited (IPC) is one of the first independent power plants in Nigeria inaugurated by former President Olusegun Obasanjo during the administration of Obong Victor Attah. It is a gas-fired power plant located in Ikot Abasi, Akwa Ibom State.

The company has its corporate office in Uyo, the Akwa Ibom State capital with a liaison office at FCT Abuja. Ibom Power was registered and incorporated with the Corporate Affairs Commission (CAC) in January 2001 by Akwa Ibom Investment and Industrial Promotion Council “AKIIPOC” now Akwa Ibom Investment Corporation (AKICORP). The Company is solely owned by the Akwa Ibom State Government.

The Nigerian Electricity Regulatory Commission licensed Ibom Power to generate 191megawatts of power in May 2008. The plant began producing electricity in December 2009. The license was increased from 191megawatts to 685Megawatts in November 2015. The 191megawatts Ibom power plant receives gas from Accugas, a subsidiary of Seven Energy (now Savannah Energy) based on a 10-year Gas Sales and Purchase Agreement, GSPA. The gas is transported from a Gas Processing Facility at Uquo in Esit Eket LGA to a Gas Receiving Facility in Ikot Abasi.

Ibom power plant evacuates its output through a 49 km 132kV transmission line from Ikot Abasi to Eket 132/33kV double circuit substation. From Eket transmission substation, the power is transported to the transmission substation at Afaha Ube, in Uyo, from Uyo to Itu, and from Itu to the national grid at Alaoji, Abia State.

Ibom Power has had three different Managing Directors. Gareth Wilcox, a Briton, led the company’s management from 2001 to May 2014. Victor Udo led the company from June 2014 to 31 July 2016. Meyen Etukudo led the company from 1 August 2016 to 14 November 2024. He was succeeded by Engr. Cammillus Umoh, who has been the Acting Managing Director from 15th November to date. Ibom Power’s highest decision-making body is the Board of Directors, led by Etido Inyang as the Chairman of the Board of Directors. The Directors are Uwem Ekanem, Ayang Ayang, and Emmanuel Ebe. Ibom Power has only one customer: the Nigerian Bulk Electricity Trading Company Plc, NBET.
