= Kashimbila Hydroelectric Power Station =

Power station in Nigeria

Kashimbila Power Station
- Location of Kashimbila Power Station; Placement on map is approximate Kashimbila Power Station (Africa) Kashimbila Power Station (Earth)
- Location: Kashimbila, Wukari Federation, Taraba State, Nigeria
- Coordinates: 06°52′27″N 09°45′43″E
- Construction began: 2014
- Opening date: 2019
- Owner: Federal Government of Nigeria

Dam and spillways
- Type of dam: Gravity dam
- Impounds: Katsina-Ala River

Reservoir
- Creates: N/A

Power Station
- Commission date: 2019
- Turbines: Francis type, Gamesa Electric Company: 4 x 10 MW
- Installed capacity: 40 MW (54,000 hp)

The Kashimbila Hydroelectric Power Station, also Kashimbilla Hydroelectric Power Station is a 40 MW hydroelectric power station across the Katsina-Ala River in Nigeria. Originally intended to be an 18 megawatt installation, the dam and power station were re-configured to a 40 MW power station and the dam reservoir expanded from 200Mm^{3} to 500Mm^{3}. The energy generated here is distributed within Taraba State, helping to meet an estimated 80 percent of households and businesses, as of 2020.

== Design ==
The hydroelectric plant was intended to resolve ecological issues and increase local power supply. Zutari Engineering of South Arica was hired to carry out "a technical feasibility study" of the dam's spillway in 2011. Later, Zutari was hired to perform the "detailed design of the dam, a technical feasibility study of the hydropower station, and, eventually the detailed design of the hydropower station". Zutari also provided engineering services for the laying of an estimated 240 kilometres (149 mi) of 132kV double circuit high voltage transmission evacuation lines and 40 kilometres (25 mi) of 33kV double-circuit transmission lines and five new substations. Commercial commissioning was effected in December 2019.

== Location ==
The power station lies across the Katsina River, near the town of Kashimbila, a Kambove Territory, town under Takum LGA Wukari Federation, Taraba State, in North-eastern Nigeria, close to the international border with Cameroon. Kashimbila is located approximately 143 kilometres (89 mi) south of Wukari Town, the nearest large town. This is approximately 354 kilometres (220 mi) southwest of Jalingo, the capital of Taraba State. The geographical coordinates of Kashimbila Hydroelectric Power Station are: 06°52'27.0"N, 9°45'43.0"E (Latitude:6.874167; Longitude:9.761944).

== Overview ==
The Kashimbila Dam was conceived during the 2011 to 2015 time frame. Its objective is multipurpose. The first goal is to mitigate flooding which used to affect an estimated six million people in Taraba State, Benue State, Cross River State, Kogi State and Delta State. The second goal is to provide drinking water to neighboring communities, with an estimated population of 400,000 people. The third goal is to provide clean electricity for use, primarily in Taraba State. The fourth objective is to provide water for irrigation to an estimated 3,000 hectares (12 mi^{2}).

The energy generated at this power station is evacuated via a number of 33kV and 132kV high voltage transmission lines to locations where the electricity is integrated into the Nigerian electricity grid. The evacuation power lines and associated substations were built new, as part of this development project.

== See also ==
- List of power stations in Nigeria
- Mambilla Hydroelectric Power Station
