= Renewable Energy Programme =

- Type: Programme
- Legal status: Active
- Headquarters: Abuja, Nigeria
- Main organ: Engr. (Mrs.) Bahijjahtu Hadiza Abubakar
- Parent organization: Nigerian Ministry of the Environment
- Website: renewableenergy.gov.ng

The Renewable Energy Programme (REP) is Nigeria's contribution to the African strategy on voluntary emission reduction in response to the United Nations Framework Convention on Climate Change (UNFCC) The Federal Ministry of Environment's Renewable Energy Programme is targeted at stimulating the energy sector by attracting capital as well as promoting the development of initiatives and technologies in Nigeria.

== Mission ==
- Create awareness about Nigeria's challenges of clean energy supply
- Develop and commercialize the Renewable energy sector
- Provide avenues for private sector participation
- Influence government policy on alternative sources of energy that are clean, reliable, stable and sustainable

== Goals ==
- Stable electricity supply
- Protection of the environment
- Reduction of Green house gas emissions
- Enhance Biofuels production through agricultural and household waste
- Convert rural cooking methods from firewood and fossil fuel to smokeless alternatives
- Address pollution, deforestation and vegetation loss
- Position Nigeria as a role model in Africa's contribution to the climate change commitments
- Job and wealth creation

== Projects ==
In order for the programme to achieve its goals, such as mitigating the impacts of climate change, the following projects have been proposed:

- Nigerian Biofuels Policy and Incentives
- The National Clean Cooking Scheme (NCSS)
- The Rural Energy Access Project (REAP)
- Energy Efficient Housing Scheme
- The Abuja Green City
- Renewable Energy Village
- The Nigerian Clean Energy Access Program (NCEAP)
- Rural Women Energy Security (RUWES)
- Clean Energy Transport Scheme (CETS)

== See also ==
- Energy in Nigeria
- National Energy Policy of Nigeria
- Rural Women Energy Security
