= Nigerian crisis =

Nigerian crisis may refer to:

- 2023 Nigerian currency crisis
- Nigerian energy supply crisis
- Nigerian Oil Crisis, 2004–2006 crisis sparked by the conflict in the Niger Delta

== See also ==
- Boko Haram insurgency
- Insurgency in Southeastern Nigeria
- Nigerien crisis (disambiguation)
