= Nigeria Renewable Energy Master Plan =

The Nigeria Renewable Energy Master Plan (REMP) is a policy being implemented by Nigeria's Federal Ministry of Environment that aims to increase the contribution of renewable energy to account for 10% of Nigerian total energy consumption by 2025. The Renewable Energy Masterplan for Nigeria was produced in 2006 with support from the UNDP.

== Description ==
The Renewable Energy Master Plan (REMP) articulates Nigeria’s vision and sets out a road map for increasing the role of renewable energy in achieving sustainable development. The policy primarily addresses Nigeria's need for increased electricity supply, improved grid reliability and security.

== Targets of REMP ==
Targets for Renewable Energy Contribution to Electricity Generation (MW) in Nigeria

| Resource | Short-term | Medium-term | Long-term |
|---|---|---|---|
| Hydro (large) | 1930 | 5930 | 48,000 |
| Hydro (small) | 100 | 734 | 19,000 |
| Solar PV | 5 | 120 | 500 |
| Solar thermal | - | 1 | 5 |
| Biomass | - | 100 | 800 |
| Wind | 1 | 20 | 40 |
| All Renewables | 2036 | 6905 | 68,345 |
| All energy sources | 16,000 | 30,000 | 192,000 |
| % of Renewables | 13% | 23% | 36% |

== See also ==
- Energy in Nigeria
