= Rural Women Energy Security =

Rural Women Energy Security (RUWES) is a project of the Renewable Energy Programme, launched by the Ministry of Environment on December 10, 2013.

== Goals ==
The RUWES project aims at providing rural women with access to clean energy. This goes hand in hand with educational endeavors.

== Members ==
More than 1.36 million Nigerian women have registered under the RUWES project, including the Nigeria Market Women Association, the Federation of Muslim Women, the Catholic Women Organization and the Police Officers Wives among others.
