= Nigerien crisis =

Nigerien Crisis may refer to:

- 2009–2010 Nigerien constitutional crisis, a political conflict in Niger in 2009–10 which led to the 2010 coup d'état
- 2023–2024 Nigerien crisis, an international crisis between Niger, ECOWAS, and other states following the 2023 coup d'état

== See also ==
- Nigerian crisis (disambiguation)
