= Rumundaka Wonodi =

Nigerian energy sector professional (born 1967)

Rumundaka Wonodi (born 30 September 1967) is a Nigerian energy sector professional. He served as the inaugural managing director and chief executive officer of Nigerian Bulk Electricity Trading Plc (NBET) from 2011 to 2016.

== Early life and education ==
Wonodi was born on Hospital Road, Port Harcourt, Nigeria. He obtained a bachelor’s degree in civil engineering from the University of Benin and a Master of Business Administration from the Yale School of Management. At Yale, he was a J. Olin Research Fellow, focusing on power and natural gas markets in the United States.

== Career ==
Wonodi worked as a director in the Origination Team at Constellation Energy Commodities Group, based in Baltimore, Maryland. In that role, he was involved in transactions in North American gas and power markets, including PJM, NYISO, MISO, the Southern Pool, and NEPOOL.

In October 2010, he joined the Presidential Task Force on Power (PTFP), where he led the Regulatory and Transactions Monitoring Team supporting the privatization of Nigeria’s electricity sector. He worked with the Bureau of Public Enterprises (BPE) and the PTFP to establish Nigerian Bulk Electricity Trading Plc, a special purpose vehicle created to purchase electricity from generation companies and sell it to distribution companies.

In August 2011, Wonodi was appointed by President Goodluck Ebele Jonathan as the inaugural managing director and chief executive officer of NBET. During his tenure, NBET negotiated Nigeria’s first greenfield power purchase agreement, which supported the development of the 450-megawatt Azura Independent Power Project.

After leaving NBET, Wonodi founded ZKJ Energy Partners, an energy advisory, investment, and power development firm. He has also served on the advisory boards of PUTTRU and Geometric Power’s APL Electric Company Limited.
