= Owerrinta =

Community in Abia State, Nigeria

Owerrinta is a community in Isiala Ngwa South Local Government Area, Abia State, Nigeria. It is near the Owerri–Aba highway and on the eastern bank of the Imo River. The Bishop's Court of the Anglican Diocese of Isial-Ngwa South is at St Peter's Cathedral Compound in Owerrinta.
