= Shawnee, North Dakota =

- Unincorporated community
- Location within North Dakota
- Coordinates: 47°57′20″N 97°45′04″W
- Country: United States
- State: North Dakota
- County: Grand Forks
- Township: Elm Grove
- Founded: 1882
- Elevation: 1,234 ft (376 m)

Population (1920)
  - Total: 15
- Time zone: UTC-6 (Central (CST))
  - Summer (DST): UTC-5 (CDT)
- ZIP code: 58251 (Larimore)
- Area code: 701
- GNIS feature ID: 1033913

Shawnee is an unincorporated community in Elm Grove Township, Grand Forks County, North Dakota, United States. A population of 15 was recorded during the 1920 census.

== History ==
Shawnee was founded in 1882 as a station for the Georgia Northeastern Railroad. It was named after settler Erving Shaw and the indigenous Shawnee tribe.

A post office was established on September 6, 1902, with John Solseng as postmaster until it was closed on May 31, 1923.
