= Azura Thermal Power Station =

Nigerian power station

Azura Edo Power Station
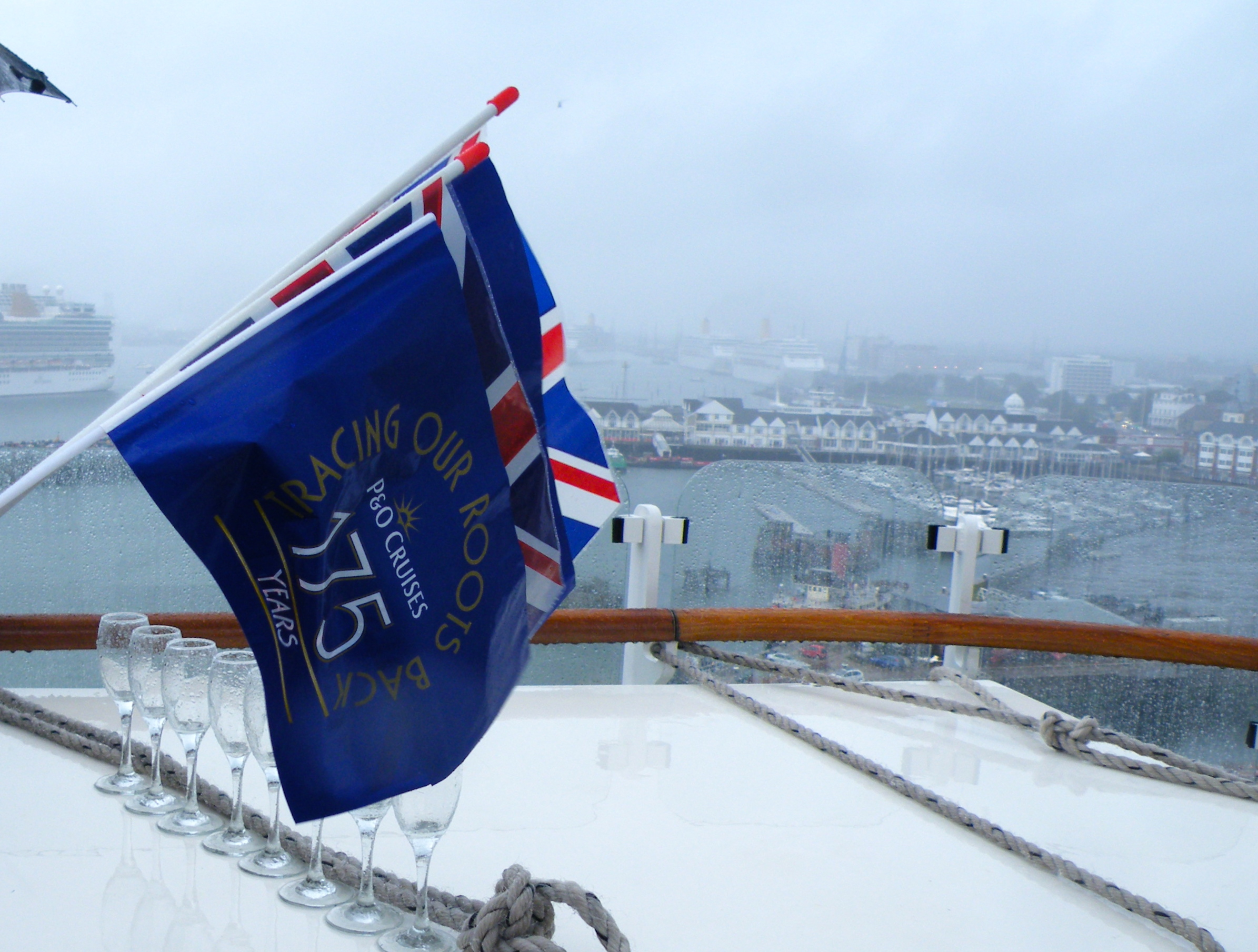
- Country: Nigeria
- Location: Edo State
- Coordinates: 06°24′32″N 05°41′01″E
- Status: Operational
- Commission date: Phase 1 - May 2018
- Owners: Amaya; Nigeria
- Operator: Seplat Petroleum Development Company

Thermal power station
- Primary fuel: Natural gas

Power generation
- Nameplate capacity: 461 MW

External links
- Website: azuraedo.com
- Commons: Related media on Commons

The Azura-Edo Power Station is a natural gas-powered open cycle electricity generation plant, with a current operational capacity of 461 megawatts, located in Benin City in Nigeria. This is the first phase of a three-phase construction project of a combined cycle gas plant with planned capacity of 1,500 megawatts.

== Location ==
The power station is located to the northeast of Benin City in Edo State, approximately 316 kilometres (196 mi), by road, east of Lagos, Nigeria's commercial capital. This location lies approximately 465 kilometres (289 mi), by road, southwest of Abuja, the country's capital city. The geographical coordinates of the power station are:06°24'32.0"N, 05°41'01.0"E (Latitude:6.408889; Longitude:5.683611).

== Overview ==
The Azura-Edo IPP is an open-cycle gas fired power plant. The power station is often referred to as the "Azura-Edo Independent Power Plant" or "Azura-Edo IPP", because the finance required to build the plant was sourced from the private sector, rather than from the government. The private sector owners of the plant took the construction risk. The post-construction risk and the operational risks are also borne by the plant's owners and their operations and maintenance contractors.

== Ownership ==
The power station is owned by Azura Power Holdings, an investment holding company for independent power projects in Africa. The majority equity investor in the Azura Power Holdings is Actis Capital, a private equity firm headquartered in London with US$7.8 billion under management. In 2004, it was spun-off from CDC Group, owned by the Government of the United Kingdom.

The minority equity investors in the plant are include: 1. Africa50, a pan-African infrastructure investment platform. 2. Anergi Group, an energy company active in Africa's emerging economies. 3. Amaya Capital, an investment firm with a focus on the infrastructure sector in Africa and 4. The Edo State Government, which holds a 2.5 percent equity stake in the plant.

== Financing ==
The power station cost US$900 million to build. The financing was obtained from fifteen financial institutions, in nine countries. The table below, illustrates the debt investors in the project. In addition, the International Bank for Reconstruction and Development (IBRD) provided partial risk guarantees; while the Multilateral Investment Guarantee Agency (MIGA) provided political risk insurance. Both IBRD and MIGA are members of the World Bank Group.

Fund Sources for Azura Thermal Power Station
No.	Name of Lender	Domicile
1	Overseas Private Investment Corporation	United States
2	CDC Group	United Kingdom
3	Proparco	France
4	German Investment Corporation	Germany
5	KfW	Germany
6	Netherlands Development Finance Company	Netherlands
7	Swedfund International	Sweden
8	International Finance Corporation	United States
9	ICF Debt Pool	Canada
10	Emerging African Infrastructure Fund	Mauritius
11	Standard Chartered Bank	United Kingdom
12	Rand Merchant Bank	South Africa
13	Standard Bank of South Africa	South Africa
14	Mauritius Commercial Bank	Mauritius
15	First City Monument Bank	Nigeria
16	Siemens Bank	Germany

== Construction ==
Construction of the plant began in January 2016 under an Engineering, Procurement and Construction ("EPC") contract with a consortium comprising (a) Siemens AG of Germany (b) Siemens Nigeria Limited and (c) Julius Berger Nigeria Limited. Siemens also provided the turbines, generators, transformers and other electrical hardware. The plant was completed on 30 April 2018, six months ahead of schedule, a record achievement for a plant of this size.

Nearly 5 million man-hours of labor were expended on the plant, without a single lost-time injury, and the names of all the developers and construction workers, numbering over 2,000 in total, are now inscribed on a brass plaque at the front of the plant's administration and control building.

== See also ==
- List of power stations in Nigeria
