= Nigerian energy supply crisis =

Ongoing failure of the Nigerian power sector

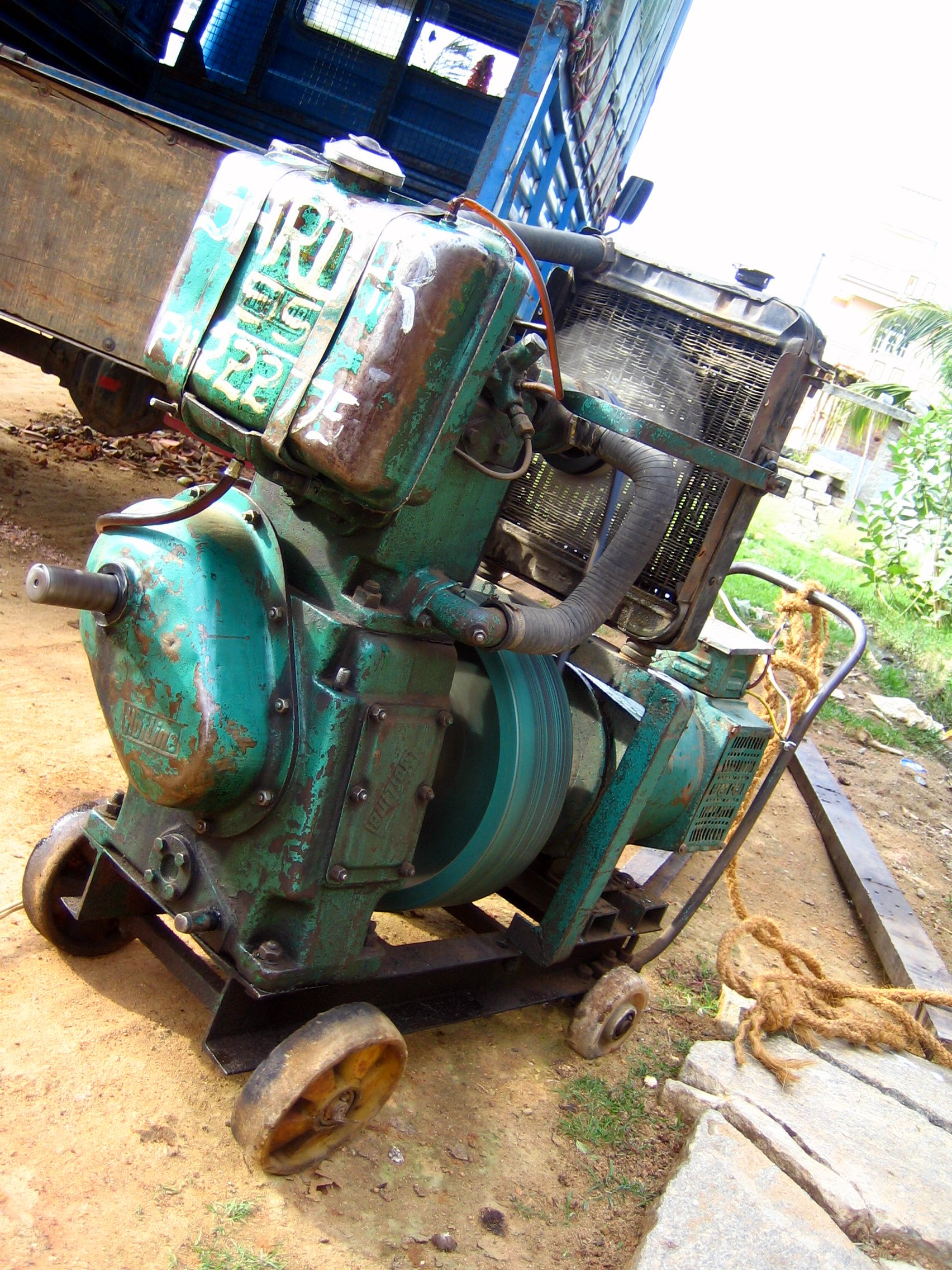
Typical diesel generator widely used in Nigeria due to lack of supply from the grid.

The Nigerian energy supply crisis refers to the ongoing failure of the Nigerian power sector to provide adequate electricity supply to domestic households and industrial producers despite a rapidly growing economy, some of the world's largest deposits of coal, oil, and gas and the country's status as Africa's largest oil producer. Currently, only 45% of Nigeria's population is connected to the energy grid whilst power supply difficulties are experienced around 85% of the time and almost nonexistent in certain regions. At best, average daily power supply is estimated at four hours, although several days can go by without any power at all. Neither power cuts nor restorations are announced, leading to calls for a load shedding schedule during the COVID-19 lockdowns to aid fair distribution and predictability.

Power supply difficulties cripple the agricultural, industrial, and mining sectors and impede Nigeria's ongoing economic development. The energy supply crisis is complex, stems from a variety of issues, and has been ongoing for decades. Most Nigerian businesses and households that can afford to do so run one or more diesel-fueled generators to supplement the intermittent supply.

Since 2005, Nigerian power reforms have focused on privatizing the generator and distribution assets and encouraging private investment in the power sector. The government continues to control transmission assets whilst making "modest progress" in creating a regulatory environment attractive to foreign investors. Minor increases in average daily power supply have been reported.

== Background ==
Until the power sector reforms of 2005, power supply and transmission was the sole responsibility of the Nigerian federal government.

As of 2012, Nigeria generated approximately 4,000 - 5,000 megawatts of power for a population of 150 million people as compared with Africa's second-largest economy, South Africa, which generated 40,000 megawatts of power for a population of 62 million. An estimated 14 - 20 gigawatts of power is provided by private generators to make up for the shortfall. Nigeria has a theoretical capacity of more than 10,000-megawatt generation capacity using existing infrastructure but has never reached close to that potential.

96% of industry energy consumption is produced off-grid using private generators.

Issues affect all areas of the sector, from generation to transmission to distribution.

Currently, the only plan the government has in place to help solve the energy crisis is to expand the fossil fuel burning sector. Alternative forms of energy are not used probably because of availability of oil in Nigeria, as it has the world’s seventh largest oil reserves.

== History of the Power Sector ==
- 1886 - First two power generators installed in the Colony of Lagos
- 1951 - Act of Parliament establishes the Electricity Corporation of Nigeria (ECN)
- 1962 - The Niger DamsAuthority (NDA) was also established for the development of hydroelectric power
- 1972 - Merger of ECN and NDA to create the National Electric Power Authority (NEPA)
- 2005 - Following reforms, the NEPA was renamed Power Holding Company of Nigeria (PHCN). The Electric Power Sector Reform (EPSR) Act was enacted allowing private investment in electricity generation, transmission, and distribution.
- November 2005, the Nigerian Electricity Regulatory Commission (NERC) was inaugurated and charged with the responsibility of tariffs regulation and monitoring of the quality of services of the PHCN.
- February 1, 2015 - The Transitional Electricity Market (TEM) was announced

== Current Challenges ==
=== Power Generators ===
The most efficient location for new power plants in the Niger Delta region due to the easy access to the sources of energy needed to run the plants.

=== Transmission Network ===
Post-reforms the transmission network continues to be government-owned and operated and remains the weakest link in the power sector supply chain. Transmission lines are old and at the point of system collapse on any given day. Even should more power be generated, the transmission network is unable to carry any additional power loading. Designed for a peak capacity of only 3,000 to 3,500MW per day breakdown of the lines is a daily occurrence. Lack of maintenance and security challenges in parts of the country only adds to the difficulties.

Currently, Nigeria uses four different types of energy: natural gas, oil, hydro, and coal The energy sector is heavily dependent on petroleum as a method for electricity production which has slowed down the development of alternative forms of energy. Three out of the four above resources used for energy production in Nigeria are linked with increasing greenhouse gas emissions: coal, oil, and natural gas, with coal, emitting the worst of the three.

Nigeria is now working to expand mini-grids and has successfully launched a pilot program that has attracted the World Bank's attention. About 80 percent of Nigeria's population lacks access to the electric grid. Nigeria now has a $750 million electrification program that it said will expand access via solar mini-grids.

== Solution to the energy and environmental problem in Nigeria ==
To increase the energy production in the country, the Federal government has started investing in solar power. Nigeria is a tropical country with a large amount of insolation. It has involved solar companies such as Hansa Energy and Arnergy in Nigeria to help in the mass production of solar plants and the distribution of solar systems for households and businesses. The Rural electrification project embarked upon by the federal government is poised to supply solar systems to 5 million households.

See the table below for a summary of the environmental impacts of the sources of electricity.

Percent of resource used for electricity production	Coal (0.4%)	Oil (24.8%)	Natural Gas (39.8%)	Hydro (35.6%)
Benefits	Nigeria has a large natural supply of this fossil fuel making it relativity easy to access and it would be the cheapest resource to develop into energy plants.	Nigeria has the seventh-largest supply of oil in the world and this makes it readily available for use as a source of electricity (Ejiogu, 2012).	Natural gas is now being mined by unconventional means (‘fracking’) which seems to have greenhouse gas emissions than former means of production. It has less greenhouse gas emissions than coal as well	Hydro is more environmentally friendly because it uses a renewable resource that is associated with less greenhouse emissions after initial development (Middleton, 2013).
Environmental Impacts	Black carbon emissions are shown to have detrimental effects on the environment because of their light-absorbing qualities. The theory is that when black carbon lands on snow and ice, the reflective properties of ice are decreased and more melting occurs.	Environmental impacts of oil production can be measured by the energy needed to produce and refine the oil, pipeline sabotage, and spills from local residents resulting in water, air and land pollution (US Energy Administration, 2013). This does not even account for the emissions created from burning the oil afterward.	Conventional and unconventional mining of natural gas potentially leaks large amounts of methane into the atmosphere which is a strong greenhouse gas emitter	Carbon dioxide methane are emitted from the area holding the water because of the vegetation decay in the area, especially in the first ten years. So for the amount of electricity generated, sometimes the amount of carbon emitted is the same (Middleton, 2013).
Barriers	Current policy discourages carbon emissions in Nigeria and there is a movement towards cleaner energy.	The barriers are all in relation to the lack of control that Nigeria has over the area where the oil is produced, causing a lack of access (US Energy Administration, 2013).	No barriers to natural gas as it is easy cheap to produce and Nigeria has a large supply of it.	Hydropower disrupts the water levels of the river and would cause tension with the neighbors of Nigeria. Post building some of the dams flood the surrounding communities.

According to the World Commission on Environment and Development (WCED), the importance of sustainability in energy is the ability to preserve its use, the importance of energy in living standards and for economic development and the significant impacts that energy systems and processes have had and continue to have on the environment (WCED, 1987). Nigeria needs to invest in sustainable resources because of the obvious signs that it will be strongly impacted by environmental change such as desertification, droughts, flooding, and water shortages. The biggest blow to Nigeria would be the low-lying areas that contain many of their natural resources being flooded if ocean levels rise as predicted. Since further development of hydro-electricity does not seem practical because of the dependence on the seasons for amount of water supply. Wind energy has potential but is unreliable for consistent energy supply. Nuclear energy could be a viable solution to the energy problem because of its lack of emissions and reliability. Nigeria also has easy access to the uranium needed for the plants.

== Environmental Solutions ==
In light of all this, there is a lot of literature surrounding different proposals of what might be done to help Nigeria develop its potential for renewable electricity. The development of renewable sources of energy is important for the future of the world. Nigeria has been in an energy crisis for a decade despite numerous attempts to reform the energy sector. The only thing that remains is to figure out which energy source is most practical for Nigeria. The development of hydroelectricity does not seem practical because of the dependence on the seasons for the amount of water supply as well as the amount of greenhouse gases it emits in the first 10 years of being built (Middleton, 2013). Wind energy has potential but is unreliable for consistent energy supply.

Two fields of arguments:

	Nuclear Energy	Wind Energy
Benefits	Increased amount of electricity would be generated, which would grow the local economy. Less greenhouse gas emissions than fossil fuels and hydropower (Middleton, 2013).	Wind is shown to be the cleanest form of energy production.
Barriers	Government corruption has led to the cancelling of multiple nuclear energy development contracts.: The power plant currently proposed would output around 10% of the country’s power which is twice as much as recommended.; Nuclear energy also requires a stable energy grid to be maintained and that independent off site power is needed, which Nigeria does not have.; Proposed sites for plants are in unstable areas where the Nigerian government does not have control of the workings of the militant groups.	Commercial energy production based on wind is limited because of variation in seasons and the speed of the winds: Relatively cheap because of cost reduction every year; Areas that had high potential for wind turbines are in the north part of Nigeria, which is the area with the least development of the power grid.

The most practical solution was mentioned by Gujba, Mulugetta, and Azapagic, (2011). The authors of this article suggested that a harmonization of different forms of energy take place. In their sustainable development scenario, they suggested some reliance on renewable energy sources and a slow change from fossil fuels to renewable energy sources. Since the rural areas are further from the electricity grid and most currently do not have power, each area would become a little hub where they would produce their own power by whatever resource was closest. For example, in the northern areas, the mini-grids would work off of wind and solar power energy. Hydropower development would have to increase in order for this to be successful. Winkler, Howells, and Baumert (2002) talk about envisioning where a country wants to end up before the development of energy resources. This is a great perspective about how to fix the energy crisis because taking the big picture into account before the development of the sector could include things outside of simply fixing the energy crisis such as poverty eradication, job creation, reducing carbon emissions, etc. Fixing the energy supply will solve many problems such as the overpricing of electricity due to the loss of the electricity within the grid (Winkler, Howells & Baumert, 2002).

== Process and Industrial Developments dispute ==
Process and Industrial Developments Ltd (P&ID) entered into a 20-year contract with the Nigerian government for natural gas supply and processing. Nigeria was to provide the gas, which PI&D was to refine so that it could be used to power the Nigerian electrical grid. PI&D could keep valuable byproducts for its own use. In 2012, PI&D demanded arbitration in London, alleging that Nigeria had not supplied the agreed quantity of gas or to construct the infrastructure it had agreed to build. The arbitral tribunal awarded damages of more than £4.8 billion. The compensation was valued £8.15 billion with interest when the case was heard in London High Court in December 2022.

== See also ==
- Energy crisis
