= Oban (disambiguation) =

Oban is a town in Argyll, Scotland. It may also refer to:

== Places ==
- Oban, New South Wales, a rural location within Armidale Regional Council area, Australia
  - Oban River, in New South Wales, Australia
- Oban, New Zealand, a settlement on Stewart Island
- Oban, Outer Hebrides, a community on Harris, Scotland
- Oban, Saskatchewan, an unincorporated area in Canada
- Oban Hills, a range of hills in Nigeria
- Oban railway station, in Argyll, Scotland

== People ==
- Eduardo Oban (born 1955), Filipino air force general
- Erin Oban, American politician and teacher

== Other uses ==
- Oban and District, a Scottish bus-company, now part of West Coast Motors
- Oban Camanachd, a shinty team from Oban
- Oban Celtic, a shinty team from Oban
- Oban Distillery, which produces Oban Scotch whisky

== See also ==
- Oben (disambiguation)
