= McCanna, North Dakota =

- Unincorporated community
- Location within North Dakota Location within the United States
- Coordinates: 48°0′21″N 97°42′36″W
- Country: United States
- State: North Dakota
- County: Grand Forks County
- Township: Elm Grove
- Elevation: 1,139 ft (347 m)

Population (2010)
  - Total: 22
- Time zone: UTC-6 (Central (CST))
  - Summer (DST): UTC-5 (CDT)
- ZIP code: 58251 (Larimore)
- Area code: 701
- GNIS feature ID: 1030133

McCanna is an unincorporated community in western Grand Forks County, North Dakota, United States. It lies approximately 37 miles (60 km) northwest of the city of Grand Forks, the county seat of Grand Forks County. McCanna has a population of 22. McCanna's elevation is 1139 feet (347 m).

== History ==
In 1881, brothers David and Simon McCanna started the McCanna Farming Company in Elm Grove Township, in Grand Forks County. David moved to Towner County just one year later in 1882, while Simon stayed and founded the town of McCanna in 1883. In 1885, Simon married Katherine O'Gorman. The couple had 8 children, with 5 sons surviving to adulthood. Simon died in 1906, passing control of the farm to his son Charles (born 1884). Under the direction of his brother Edwin McCanna, the McCanna family established the Bank of McCanna in 1911. In June 1930, the Bank of McCanna collapsed.

In 1920, the now widowed Katherine McCanna consulted with renowned Grand Forks architect Joseph Bell DeRemer, who drew up plans for a "French country home". In 1922, the home completed construction on the north side of McCanna. The house was passed through the family, until ending up in the ownership of Margery McCanna, the granddaughter of Simon and Katherine McCanna, in 1973. Margery died in 2010, willing the house and large endowment to the North Dakota Museum of Art. The McCanna house, as it's called today, was turned into a venue for artists-in-residence.

== Notable people ==
- Oben Gunderson Jr. (1927–2018), former North Dakota House of Representatives member
