= Omoba, Abia State =

Local Government headquarters of Isiala Ngwa South

Omoba or Umuoba is a town and local government headquarters of Isiala Ngwa South, Abia State, Nigeria.

Omoba is the anglicised spelling of the name Umuoba. Omoba originally is "Umuoba." The prefix "Umu" in Igbo Language means "children". The Igbo race has "Umu" attached to most of their villages and Towns. This was a way of naming a people, example "Umu Okegwu" meaning "The children of Okegwu."

The suburbs in Omoba are: Umugba, Umuagu, Umuamosi, Umuezechi, Umuokea, Umuire, Umuokoroukwu and Umuoleihe.

Omoba is a railway town 22 kilometres (14 mi) away from Aba city centre. After coal was discovered at Udi, the Eastern Railway with station in the town was built to Port Harcourt between 1913 and 1916. This railway was extended to Kaduna via Kafanchan in 1927, connecting the Eastern Railway to the Lagos–Kano Railway. The Eastern Railway was extended to its northeastern terminus of Maiduguri between 1958 and 1964.

The National Integrated Power Project [NIPP] saw the building of a sub-power station at the heart of Umuoba which has improved power supply within the town in recent times.

The Nigerian Postal Service has an office in the town. There is also a large Daily Market that service the town.

The Umuoba Central Model School established in 1937 is one of the oldest primary schools in the town. The Umuoba Group Primary School was established in 1933, Umuagu Community School, 1957 and the Migrant Farmer's School in 2008.

Town has the St George's Catholic Church, under the Aba Catholic Diocese. The Catholic parish is located at the premises of Group Primary School, Umuokoroukwu. There is also the St Banabas Anglican Church and St Mark Anglican Church located at the heart of the town. St Banabas Church is an Anglican archdeaconry headquarters. It is located close to Omoba Central Model School.

Other religious worship centres in the town include the Presbyterian Church, the Methodist Church, the Assemblies of God Church, the Seventh-day Adventist Church and the Kingdom Hall of Jehovah's Witnesses. There is also the Church of Jesus Christ of Latter-day Saints, the Redeemed Christian Church of God, the Living Faith Church, the Deeper Life Bible Church, the Apostolic Faith Church, and the Church of Christ.

Below is a list of polling units of the Independent National Electoral Commission, including villages and schools, organised by electoral ward: Umuire - Village Hall; Umuezechi - Village Hall; Omoba - Omoba Motor Park; Umuokoroukwu - Village Hall; Umuokea - Village Hall; Omoba - Central School; Umuagu - Village Hall; Umugba - Village Hall; Umuokegwu (I) - Village Hall; Amapu - Village Hall; Umuekegwu Village Hall.; Umuamosi - Village Hall; Egbelu - Egbelu Umuokegwu Village Hall.
