= Oben =

Oben is both a given name and a surname. It may refer to:

== Surname ==
- Crispín Oben (1876–1947), Filipino lawyer and politician
- Ernest Oben-Etchi (born 1975), Cameroonian footballer
- R.J. Oben (born 2001), American football player (son of Roman Oben)
- Roman Oben (born 1972), Cameroonian-born American football player, broadcaster, and NFL executive

== Given name ==
- Oben Gunderson Jr. (born 1927), American politician and farmer
- Samuel Oben Ojong (born 1980), Cameroonian footballer

== See also ==
- Oban (disambiguation)
