= Mambilla Hydroelectric Power Station =

Nigerian hydroelectric power station

- Map of Nigeria showing the location of Mambilla Hydro Power Station
- Official name: Mambilla Hydro Power Station
- Country: Nigeria
- Location: Kakara village, Taraba State
- Coordinates: 06°49′23″N 11°07′06″E
- Status: Proposed
- Construction cost: US$5.8 billion
- Owner: Federal Government of Nigeria

Dam and spillways
- Type of dam: Mass concrete
- Impounds: Donga River

Power Station
- Commission date: 2030 (expected)
- Type: Run of the river
- Turbines: 12
- Installed capacity: (planned) 3050 MW

The Mambilla Hydroelectric Power Station is a 3,050 MW (4,090,000 hp) hydroelectric power project under development in Nigeria. When completed, it will be the largest power-generating installation in the country, and one of the largest hydroelectric power stations in Africa.

== Location ==
The power station is located in Kakara village, in Taraba State, Nigeria. This is near the town of Gembu, close to the border with Cameroon. The power station sits across the Donga River, and consists of four dams and two underground power houses. Gembu is approximately 413 kilometres (257 mi), by road, southeast of Wukari, the nearest large town, all in Taraba State.

== Overview ==
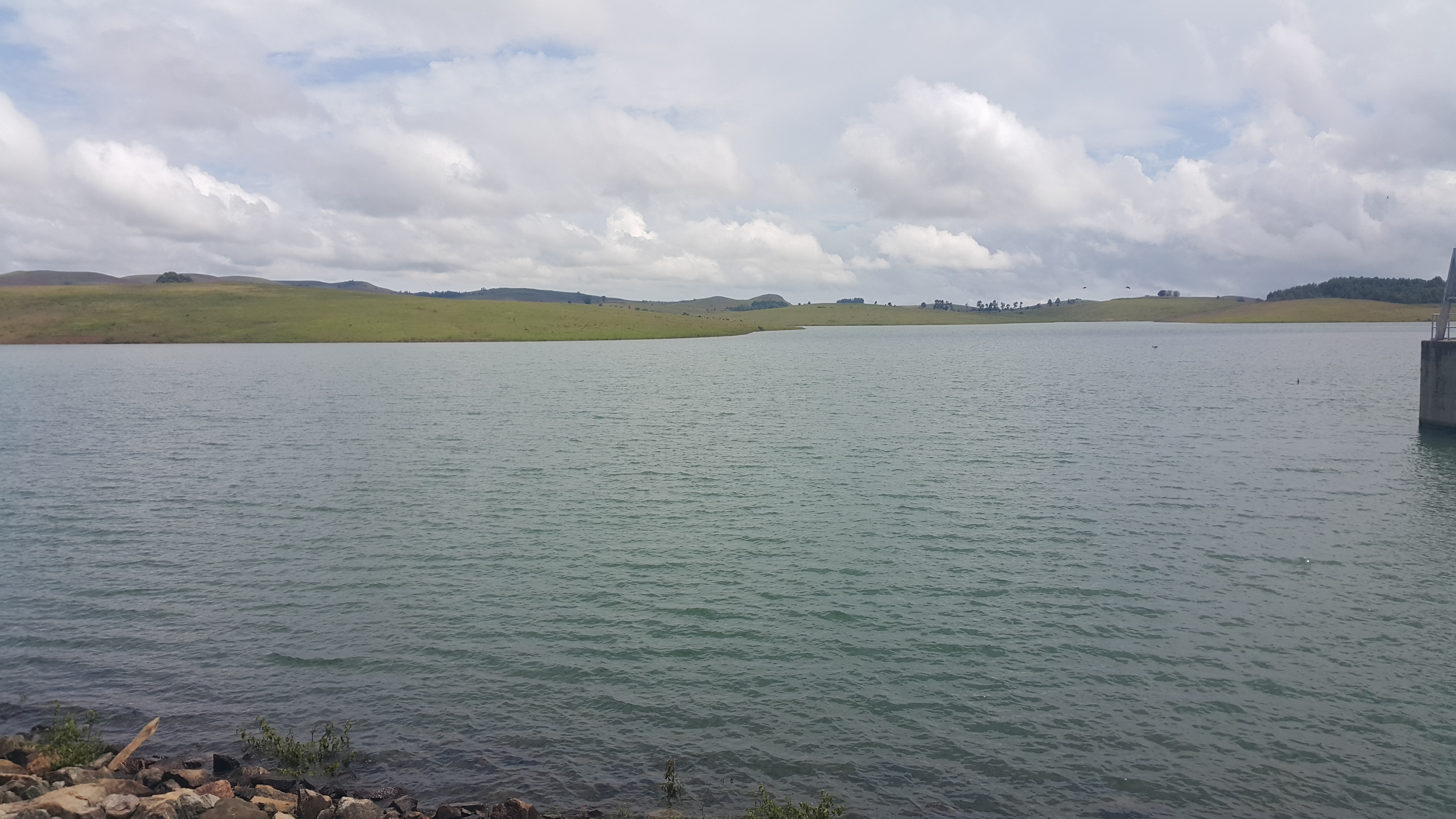
Mambilla Plateau

Constructed in 1982, the main Mambilla Dam is a large roller-compacted concrete dam and reservoir at 1,300 metres (4,300 ft) above sea level. From this dam, water is diverted off the reservoir towards the western side of the plateau through four hydraulic tunnels totaling 33 kilometres (21 mi), intercepted by four smaller dams: Nya, Sum Sum, Nghu, and Api Weir.

Beyond these dams, the tunnels lead into a 1,000 metres (3,300 ft) drop shaft tunneled down through the rock to a massive underground power station with a generating capacity of 3,050 megawatts (4,090,000 hp). Passing through a short tunnel, the water then exits the base of the plateau and flows into a tributary river that rejoins the Donga River downstream of the plateau.

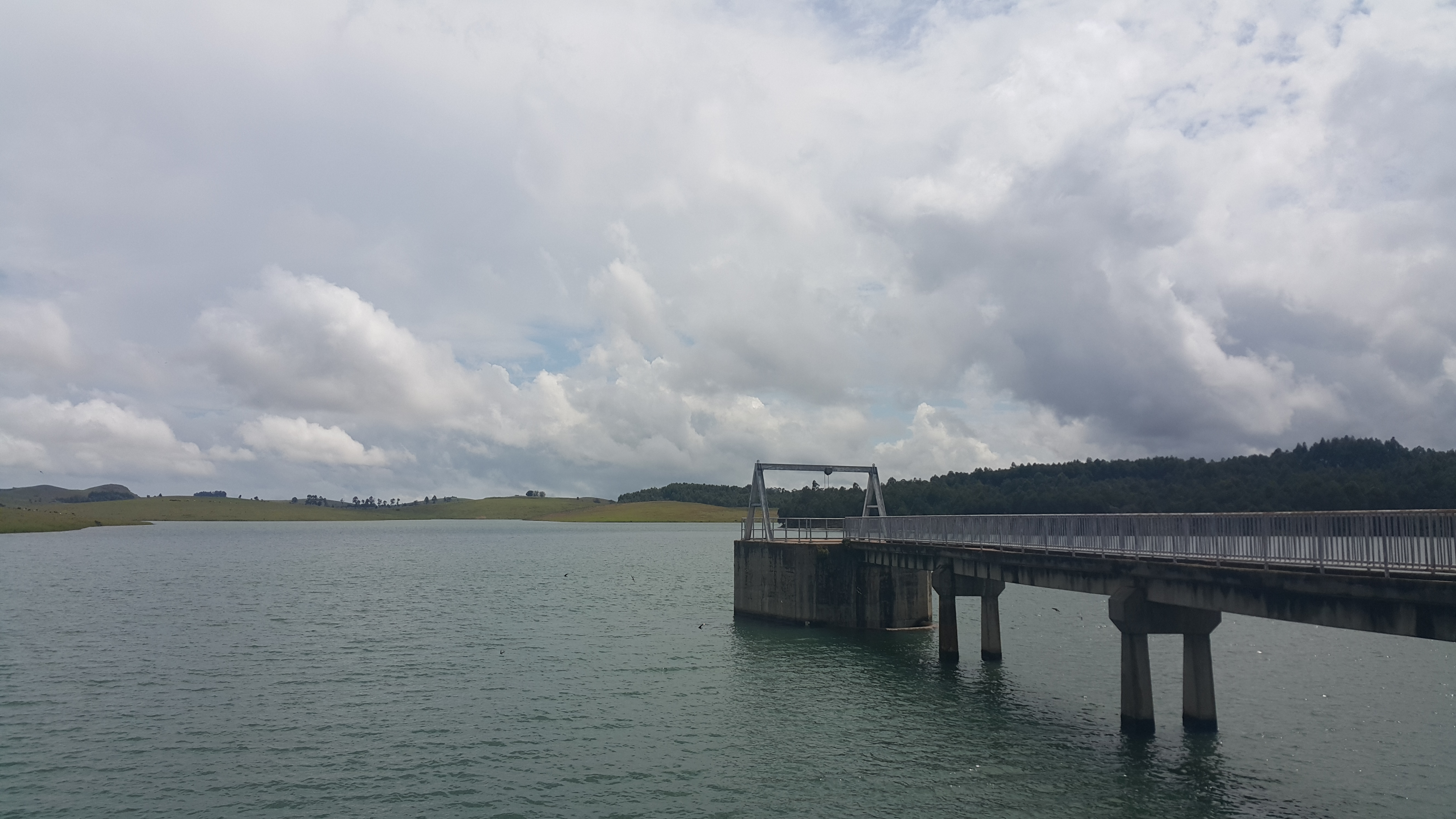
Mambilla Plateau

== Development ==
On 30 August 2017, the Federal Executive Council (FEC) approved the award of the construction contract to a consortium of Gezhouba Group, Sinohydro, and CGCOC Group.

The Mambilla Hydropower Plant Project has been planned for over 40 years. It is expected to connect to four dams across the Donga River. The first preliminary feasibility study for the Mambilla Hydropower Plant was reportedly carried out by Moto Columbus in 1972, but attempts to construct the power station up to now have been unsuccessful.

== Funding ==
The total cost of the project is budgeted at US$5.8 billion. The Exim Bank of China has agreed to lend 85 percent (US$4.93 billion) towards the construction. The funds will be paid directly to the construction consortium in tranches, as the work progresses. The Federal Government of Nigeria has committed to contribute 15 percent (US$870 million) of the construction costs.

== Construction ==
In November 2017, there were attempts to start construction of this power station. However, due to various constraints, including landslides, and a lawsuit at the International Court of Arbitration, the project stalled again. In February 2020, following the resolution of the lawsuit, there were fresh attempts to resume construction.

Construction is expected to take at least seven years from start to finish, due to the technical complexity of the project. A more realistic completion date is 2030.

== Other considerations ==
Construction of this power station is expected to generate 50,000 temporary and permanent jobs. The power generated will be sold to the Transmission Company of Nigeria, which will transmit it to two locations, where it will be integrated into the Nigerian electricity grid; one 330kV high voltage transmission line will connect to Jalingo and two to Makurdi. The entire new planned high voltage transmission system measures over 700 kilometres (435 mi).

== See also ==
- List of power stations in Nigeria
- Kashimbila Hydroelectric Power Station
