= WiSolar =

Transnational solar electricity company in Africa

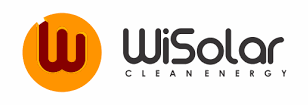
- Company type: Privately held company
- Industry: Solar Energy
- Founded: 2016
- Headquarters: Bronkhorstspruit, City of Tshwane Metropolitan Municipality, Gauteng, South Africa
- Area served: South Africa, Nigeria
- Key people: Tonye Irims (Founder & Head of WiSolar), Anteonet van der Walt (Chief of Operations)
- Services: Electricity
- Website: wisolar.co

WiSolar (pronounced wee-solar) is a transnational solar electricity company in Africa that was founded in 2016 by Nigerian-born entrepreneur Tonye Irims. The company is headquartered in Bronkhorstspruit, South Africa, with a presence in Nigeria. Its primary mission is to make solar electricity easily accessible and affordable across Africa.

== History ==
WiSolar began its journey in 2016 as an inverter Original Equipment Manufacturer (OEM) with a proprietary remote shut-off feature and solar installer. In 2019, the company transitioned into a solar electricity provider for residential and commercial customers, catering to variable loads.

== Initiatives ==
=== Solar Energy Awareness Initiative ===
In March 2017, WiSolar initiated the "Solar Scholar" campaign to promote awareness of renewable energy in South Africa. The campaign involved visiting educational institutions across the country to educate staff and students on the benefits of clean energy in homes.To further expand this initiative, WiSolar developed an online platform that allowed educational institutions and students to register and submit ideas on solar energy.

=== Prepaid Solar Electricity Roll-Out ===
In July 2019, WiSolar proposed to raise $40M in debt and equity to accelerate the roll-out of prepaid solar electricity in South Africa and Nigeria. The company aimed to eliminate environmentally polluting fuel generators, and promote renewable energy in Nigeria with specific focus on areas such as Lagos, Abuja, Enugu, Abia, Imo, Anambra, Ogun, Oyo, Ondo, and Rivers states in Nigeria. In 2022, WiSolar launched a mobile application known as WiGo. This mobile application enables users to independently purchase prepaid solar electricity for their homes.

=== Upskilling Program and Partnership ===
In November 2019, WiSolar announced plans to upskill the electrical engineering graduates of its solar academy, enhancing its internal capabilities in solar electricity. Additionally, in March 2020, the company forged a partnership with LG to incorporate high-efficiency black photovoltaic panels, enabling LG to become a provider of solar panels for WiSolar and its customers.

=== Solar Financing for Mainstream Adoption ===
As part of its efforts to make solar electricity more mainstream in South Africa, WiSolar established the Gateway Office in Bronkhorstspruit. In June 2020, the company began offering solar financing solutions to facilitate broader adoption of solar energy. In 2022, WiSolar commenced the deployment of their prepaid solar electricity to homes in residential estates within South Africa and Nigeria, after a period of delays.

== Services ==
WiSolar offers solar electricity services for both residential and commercial customers, catering to variable loads in South Africa and Nigeria.

== Recognition ==
In 2025, WiSolar was listed among Africa's Fastest-Growing Companies by the Financial Times for its contributions to renewable energy and solar electricity solutions across Africa and also listed as part of the 25 African Startups to Watch in 2025 by Bloomberg.
