= Zamfara Power Station =

Nigerian hydropower plant

The Zamfara Power Station is a hydro power plant located in Zamfara State, Nigeria. The 100 megawatt plant is situated on the Bunsuru River and was commissioned by former President Umaru Musa Yar'Adua.

== Construction ==
The hydro power plant was constructed by China Geo-Engineering Corporation and cost ₦19.2 billion to complete.
