= Elm Grove Township, North Dakota =

- Township
- Location within North Dakota
- Coordinates: 47°58′35″N 97°41′18″W
- Country: United States
- State: North Dakota
- County: Grand Forks

Area
  - Total: 36.48 sq mi (94.47 km^{2})
  - Land: 36.48 sq mi (94.47 km^{2})
  - Water: 0 sq mi (0.00 km^{2})
- Elevation: 1,129 ft (344 m)

Population (2020)
  - Total: 103
  - Density: 2.82/sq mi (1.09/km^{2})
- Time zone: UTC-6 (Central (CST))
  - Summer (DST): UTC-5 (CDT)
- ZIP code: 58251 (Larimore)
- Area code: 701
- FIPS code: 38-23700
- GNIS feature ID: 1036613

Elm Grove Township is a township in Grand Forks County, North Dakota, United States. The population was 103 at the 2020 census.

== Geography ==
Elm Grove Township has a total area of 36.474 square miles (94.47 km^{2}), all land.

The unincorporated communities of McCanna and Shawnee are located in the township.

=== Major highways ===
- U.S. Highway 2
- North Dakota Highway 18

== Demographics ==
As of the 2023 American Community Survey, there were an estimated 44 households.
