= CGCOC Group =

Chinese construction company

- Formerly: CGC Overseas Construction Group
- Company type: State-owned enterprise
- Predecessor: CGC Nigeria
- Founded: 1983 (CGC Nigeria); 2002 (CGCOC)
- Headquarters: Beijing, China
- Owner: Sinopec Group (40.7%); China Geo-Engineering Corporation (13.3%)
- Parent: SASAC of the State Council (ultimate)

CGCOC Group Co., Ltd. (Chinese: 中地海外集团) formerly known as CGC Overseas Construction Group Co., Ltd. (Chinese: 中地海外建设集团) is a Chinese construction company that ranks among the 100 largest contractors based on international projects according to the annual Engineering News Record ranking.

== History ==
The predecessor of CGCOC Group was founded by the Ministry of Geology & Mineral Resources in 1983 as CGC Nigeria Ltd.. In 2002 other investors were introduced in the incorporation of CGC Overseas Construction Group Co., Ltd., which CGC Nigeria became part of the business group.

== Shareholders ==
CGCOC Group was founded by Sinopec Star Petroleum (a wholly owned subsidiary of Sinopec Group), China Geo-Engineering Corporation (CGC), and other shareholders in 2002. As of 31 December 2015, Sinopec Star Petroleum owned 40.7% stake, China Geo-Engineering Corporation owned 13.333% stake, Shanxi Bureau of Geology Exploration (Chinese: 山西省地质勘查局) owned 4.375% stake, 13th Construction Co., Ltd. of China National Chemical Engineering Co., Ltd. owned 1.04% stake, as well as many natural person.

== Construction projects ==
The company carries out projects across Africa and in other markets. In Cameroon, the company signed a deal in December 2007 to increase water production and distribution in Douala from 115,00 to 260,000 cubic meters in a year by constructing pipe networks, wells and a potable water treatment plant.

One of the company's substantial businesses in Africa is road building in Ethiopia. In the period from 2005 to 2006, the company was awarded about $276 million in Ethiopian road projects. These projects included the Dodola Junction-Goba and Dera-Gololcha Mechara roads located in Oromia.
