= China Metal Recycling =

Chinese waste management company

China Metal Recycling (Holdings) Limited 中国再生金属资源(控股)有限公司
- Type: Privately owned company
- Industry: Recycling industry
- Founded: 2000
- Headquarters: Guangzhou, Guangdong, People's Republic of China
- Area served: People's Republic of China
- Key people: Chairman: Mr. Chun Chi-wai
- Website: Archived website

China Metal Recycling (Holdings) Limited (SEHK: 773) was formerly the largest recycler of scrap metal in mainland China by revenue. Headquartered in Guangzhou, it was engaged in collecting and processing scrap steel, copper, and other metals. The company was wound up and delisted from the Hong Kong Stock Exchange after an accounting fraud scandal.

== History ==
Founded in 2000, China Metal Recycling was listed on the Hong Kong Stock Exchange in June 2009, pricing its IPO at HK$5.15 per share. Its share price rose 24% on the first trading day to HK$6.44.

In November 2009, the company's CFO, Wong Hok-leung, abruptly resigned, citing denial of access to key information. The share price plunged 24% in a single day following the announcement.

== Fraud allegations and suspension ==
On 28 January 2013, trading of the company's shares was suspended after short-seller Glaucus Research published a report accusing the company of fabricating financial figures and overstating its import volume.

== Liquidation and delisting ==
In 2015, the Securities and Futures Commission (SFC) of Hong Kong petitioned the court to wind up the company in the public interest. The court found that China Metal Recycling had obtained its listing by fraud and ordered its winding up.

On 4 February 2016, the Hong Kong Stock Exchange announced that the company would be delisted for "obtaining listing by fraud".

== Legal consequences ==
In 2019, the SFC fined UBS HK$375 million and suspended its sponsor license for one year over failures related to China Metal Recycling's IPO. China Merchants Securities was also fined HK$27 million. In 2022, the liquidators filed suit against UBS AG for alleged negligence, but portions of the claim were dismissed due to procedural errors.
