= Omotoso =

Omotoso or Omotosho is a Nigerian surname.

- Akin Omotoso (born 1974), Nigerian film director, writer, and actor living in South Africa, son of Kole and brother of Ywande
- Kole Omotoso (1943–2023), Nigerian writer who lived in South Africa
- Mike Omotosho (died 2022), Nigerian politician, chairman of the Labour Party 2015–2016
- Omolara Omotosho (born 1993), Nigerian sprinter
- Rosaline Omotosho (died 1999), Nigerian judge
- Tim Omotoso (born 1958), Nigerian televangelist and senior pastor of the Jesus Dominion International
- Wale Omotoso (born 1985), Nigerian boxer
- Yewande Omotoso (born 1980), South African-based novelist, architect and designer living in South Africa, daughter of Kole and sister of Akin
