= National Energy Policy of Nigeria =

The National Energy Policy of Nigeria establishes guidelines for the protection of the environment in the exploitation of Nigeria's fossil fuels. It also emphasizes the exploration of renewable and alternative energy sources, primarily solar, wind, and biomass.

At the COP26 in 2021, the Nigerian government announced an Energy Transition Plan that seeks to meet its mid-century decarbonisation targets.
