= Oben Gunderson Jr. =

American politician (1927–2018)

Member of the North Dakota House of Representatives from the 19th district
- In office 1971–1982

Personal details
- Born: May 6, 1927 McCanna, North Dakota
- Died: September 5, 2018 (aged 91) Grand Forks, North Dakota
- Party: Republican
- Profession: Farmer

Oben Gunderson Jr. (May 6, 1927 – September 5, 2018) was an American politician who was a member of the North Dakota House of Representatives. He represented the 19th district from 1971 to 1982 as a member of the Republican party. Gunderson attended Concordia College in Moorhead, Minnesota and became a grain farmer and licensed pilot. He lived in McCanna, North Dakota.
