= List of power stations in Nigeria =

Nigeria produces its grid-connected electricity primarily by hydroelectric and fossil-fueled thermal power stations. With a total installed capacity of 8,457 MW (81 percent of the total) in early 2014, thermal power plants (gas-fired plants) dominate the Nigerian power supply mix. Electricity production from hydroelectric sources as reported at 17.59% in 2014, according to the World Bank.

== Ownership ==
The power plants are classified, based on ownership, as either:

- Fully owned by the Federal Government of Nigeria (FGN). There is a plan to privatize these power plants.
- Owned by the Niger Delta Power Holding Company (NDPHC). The NDPHC is owned by the three tiers of government in Nigeria (federal, state, and local). These power plants are referred to as being part of the National Integrated Power Project (NIPP).
- Wholly owned by state governments and/or private companies/individuals. Such a power plant is referred to as an independent power producer (IPP).

== Capacity, generation and demand ==
As of December 2013, the total installed or nameplate capacity (maximum capacity) of the power plants was 6,953 MW. Available capacity was 4,598 MW. Actual average generation was 3,800 MW.

As of December 2014, the total installed capacity of the power plants was 7,445 MW. Available capacity was 4,949 MW. Actual average generation was less than 3,900 MW.

The Presidential Task Force on Power's peak demand forecast is 12,800 MW (April 2015).

== Fossil fuel power stations ==
=== Natural gas ===
Power station	Community	Coordinates	Type	Capacity	Status	Year completed	Gas supply source
AES Barge (IPP)	Egbin	6°33′33″N 3°36′54″E	Simple cycle gas turbine	270 MW	Non-operational	2001	Escravos–Lagos Pipeline System
Aba Power Station (IPP)	Aba Abia State	5°09′11″N 7°18′38″E	Simple cycle gas turbine	140 MW		2012	
Afam IV-V Power Station (FGN)	Afam, Rivers State	4°51′05″N 7°15′17″E	Simple cycle gas turbine	726 MW (Afam IV -6 x 75 MW (GT 13-18), Afam V -2 x 138 MW (GT 19-20))	Non-operational	1982 (Afam IV)- 2002 (Afam V)	Okoloma gas plant
Afam VI Power Station (IPP)	Afam, Rivers State	4°50′58″N 7°15′24″E	Combined cycle gas turbine	624 MW	Partially operational	2009 (gas turbines), 2010 (steam turbines)	Okoloma gas plant
Alaoji Power Station (NIPP)	Abia state	5°04′00″N 7°19′24″E	Combined cycle gas turbine	1074 MW	Partially operational	2012-2015	Norten Option Gas Pipeline from Obigbo gas plant
Calabar Power Station (NIPP)	Calabar	5°11′21″N 8°16′25″E	Simple cycle gas turbine	561 MW	Non-operational	2014	UQUO gas plant (planned)
Egbema Power Station (NIPP)	Imo State	5°33′56″N 6°44′18″E	Simple cycle gas turbine	338 MW	Non-operational	2012-2013	Gbarain Ubie gas plant (planned)
Egbin Thermal Power Station (FGN but privatized)	Egbin	6°33′47″N 3°36′55″E	Gas-fired steam turbine	1320 MW (six 220-MW units)	Partially operational (1000 MW)	1985-1986	Escravos–Lagos Pipeline System
Geregu I Power Station - privatized	Geregu Kogi State		Simple cycle gas turbine	414 MW	Partially operational	2007	Oben-Geregu pileline, Oben gas plant
Geregu II Power Station (NIPP)	Geregu Kogi State		Simple cycle gas turbine	434 MW	Partially operational	2012	Oben-Geregu pileline, Oben gas plant
Ibom Power Station (IPP)	Ikot Abasi	4°33′53″N 7°34′06″E	Simple cycle gas turbine	190 MW	Partially operational (90 MW)	2009	
Ihovbor Power Plant (NIPP)	Benin City	6°24′20″N 5°41′00″E	Simple cycle gas turbine	450 MW	Partially operational	2012-2013	Escravos–Lagos Pipeline System
Okpai Power Station (IPP)	Okpai		Combined cycle gas turbine	480 MW	Operational	2005	Obiafu-Obrikom(Ob-Ob) gas plant
Olorunsogo Power Station	Olorunsogo	6°52′55″N 3°18′52″E	Simple cycle gas turbine	336 MW (8 x 42 MW)	Partially operational	2007	Escravos–Lagos Pipeline System
Olorunsogo II Power Station (NIPP)	Olorunsogo	6°53′08″N 3°18′56″E	Combined cycle gas turbine	675 MW NDPHC (4x112.5 MW and 2x112.5 MW steam turbines). Working below capacity due to gas supply issues.	Partially operational	2012	Escravos–Lagos Pipeline System
Omoku Power Station (IPP)	Omoku		Simple cycle gas turbine	150 MW (6 x 25 MW gas turbines)	Operational	2005	Agip (Obiafu-Obrikom (Ob-Ob) gas plant)
Omoku II Power Station (NIPP)	Omoku		Simple cycle gas turbine	225 MW (2 x 112.5 MW gas turbines)	Non-operational	Incomplete	
Omotosho I Power Station (FGN-privatized)	Omotosho	6°44′09″N 4°42′39″E	Simple cycle gas turbine	336 MW; (8 x 42 MW)	Partially operational	2005	Escravos–Lagos Pipeline System
Omotosho II Power Station (NIPP)	Omotosho		Simple cycle gas turbine	450 MW (4x112.5 MW)	Partially operational	2012	Escravos–Lagos Pipeline System
Sapele Power Statio - privatized	Sapele	5°55′31″N 5°38′44″E	Gas-fired steam turbine and simple cycle gas turbine	1020 MW (phase I: 1978-1980 6 x 120 MW gas-fired steam turbines, phase II: 1981 4 x 75 MW gas turbines)	Partially operational (135 MW)	1978–1981	Escravos–Lagos Pipeline System
Sapele Power Station (NIPP)	Sapele	5°55′40″N 5°38′41″E	Simple cycle gas turbine	450 MW (4x112.5 MW)	Partially operational	2012	Escravos–Lagos Pipeline System
Transcorp Ughelli Power Station (privatised), known also as Delta power station	Ughelli, Delta State	5°32′28″N 5°54′56″E	Simple cycle gas turbine	900 MW	Partially operational (465 MW)	1966-1990: Plant was built in 4 phases. I: 1966 (decommissioned), II: 1975 6 x 25 MW, III: 1978 6 x 25 MW, IV: 1990 6 x 100 MW.	Utorogu, Ugheli East gas plant
Ibom Power Plant (AKSG)	Ikot Abasi		Combined cycle gas turbine. Consists of two GE Frame 6B and one Frame 9E turbine generators installed in a simple cycle configuration, using the conventional open cycle gas turbine (OCGT) technology. These three gas turbines are GTG 1 (model PG 6551B), GTG 2 (model PG 6561B), and GTG3 (model PG 9171E), combined to give an installed capacity of 191MW.	191MW	Operational since 2009	2010→	Uquo CPF by Frontier Oil Limited / 7E JV
Azura Power Station (IPP)	Benin City	6°24'47.71"N 5°40'42.96"E	Simple cycle gas turbine	450 MW	Fully operational	2018	

=== Coal ===
The Itobe coal power plant was proposed for up to 2,400 MW but plans are dormant. The Oji River Thermal Power Plant was a coal-fired power plant. It is no longer operational.

== Hydroelectric ==
=== In service ===
Hydroelectric station	Community	Coordinates	Type	Capacity (MW)	Year completed	Name of reservoir	River
Kainji Power Station	Kainji, Niger State		Reservoir	800	1968	Kainji Lake	Niger River
Jebba Power Station	Jebba, Niger State		Reservoir	540	1985	Lake Jebba	Niger River
Shiroro Power Station	Shiroro, Niger State		Reservoir	600	1990	Lake Shiroro	Kaduna River
Zamfara Power Station			Reservoir	100	2012	Gotowa Lake	Bunsuru River
Dadinkowa Power Station	Dadinkowa, Gombe State		Reservoir	40	2018	Lake Dadinkowa	Gongola River
Kashimbila Power Station	Kashimbila Taraba State		Reservoir	40	2019		Katsina-Ala River

=== Under construction or proposed ===
Hydroelectric station	Community	Coordinates	Type	Capacity (MW)	Year completed	Name of reservoir	River
Kano Power Station			Reservoir	100	2015		Hadejia River
Zamfara Power Station			Reservoir	100	2012	Gotowa Lake	Bunsuru River
Dadin Kowa Power Station	Gombe State		Reservoir	40	2018	Lake Dadinkowa	Gongola River
Mambilla Power Station	Taraba State	6°41′46″N 11°09′16″E	Reservoir	3050	2024	Gembu, Sum Sum and Nghu Lake	Donga River

== Solar ==
=== Under construction or proposed ===
Solar power station	Community	Coordinates	Capacity (MW)	Year expected completed
Ashama Solar Power Station	Delta State	06°09′54″N 06°25′35″E	200	2023

== See also ==
- List of power stations in Africa
- List of largest power stations in the world
