= Nigerian Bulk Electricity PLC =

Administrator of the Nigerian electricity supply industry

The Nigerian Bulk Electricity Trading (NBET) Plc.
- Founded: July 29, 2010; 15 years ago
- Headquarters: Abuja, Nigeria
- Key people: Nnaemeka Ewelukwa, CEO
- Website: www.nbet.com.ng

The Nigerian Bulk Electricity Trading (NBET) Plc. (NBET) is the manager and administrator of the electricity pool (‘The Pool’) in the Nigerian electricity supply industry (NESI). It was incorporated on the 29th day of July 2010 and is 100% owned by the Federal Government of Nigeria.

In line with the “Roadmap to Power Sector Reform” of August 2010, and, in fulfillment of the requirements of EPSRA, the Nigerian Bulk Electricity Trading PLC, (NBET) a.k.a. the Bulk Trader, was incorporated on July 29, 2010, as the SPV for carrying out, under license from NERC, the bulk purchase and resale function contemplated by the EPSRA. As such NBET has been set up “engage in the purchase and resale of electric power and ancillary services from independent power producers and from the successor generation companies”

== Background ==
Nigerian's deficient power sector supply has been a challenge that the past three presidential administrations have steadfastly sought to address. In 2001, the federal Government, in a bid to address the deficiency in power sector supply, adopted the National Electric power policy for the reform of the sector. Following suit, the Electric Power Sector Reform Act (EPSRA), was passed into law in March 2005. A key thrust of the sector from public to private sector. In furtherance of this goal, the Act saw the creation of the Power Holding Company of Nigeria (PHCN) which assumed the assets, Liabilities and employees of the erstwhile Nigeria Electricity Power Authority (NEPA); the subsequent unbundling of PHCN into 18 successor companies, the establishment of the Rural Electrification Agency (REA) and the provision for the establishment of two special purpose vehicles (SPVs) to undertake electric power trading and management of extant liabilities respectively

== History ==
NBET was incorporated on July 29, 2010, in line with the "Roadmap to Power Sector Reform" and, in fulfillment of the requirements of the Electric Power Sector Reform Act (EPSRA) of 2005, for a "trading licensee holding a bulk purchase and resale license" to "engage in the purchase and resale of electrical power and ancillary services from independent power producers and from the successor generation companies".

On August 23, 2011, the President, Dr. Goodluck Ebele Jonathan, GCFR, inaugurated a nine-person Board of Directors that included Mr. Rumundaka Wonodi as its pioneer managing director and chief executive officer (2011 - 2016).

NBET's power purchase agreements (PPAs) with independent power producers are backed by credit enhancement instruments offered by the FGN.

== Services ==
NBET purchases electricity from the Generating Companies through Power Purchase Agreements (PPAs) and sells to the Distribution Companies through Vesting Contracts. The Generating Companies include the privatized PHCN successor companies, the Niger Delta Power Holding Companies (NIPPs), the already existing Independent Power Producers (IPPs) and the new IPPs.
