= Nigerian National Integrated Power Project =

The Nigerian National Integrated Power Project (NIPP) was conceived in 2004 when Olusegun Obasanjo was the President of the Federal Government of Nigeria. It was formed to address the issues of insufficient electric power generation and excessive gas flaring from oil exploration in the Niger Delta region. Seven power plants were designed in gas-producing states as part of the project.

Planned power plants included:

- Ihovbor Power Station Benin, Edo State with the capacity of 4 x 112.5 MW (ISO 126 MW).
- Calabar Power Station, Cross River State with the capacity of 5 x 112.5112.5 MW (ISO 126 MW).
- Egbema Power Station, Imo State with the capacity of 3 x 112.5 MW (ISO 126 MW).
- Gbarain Power Station, Yenagoa, Bayelsa State with the capacity of 2 x 112.5 MW (ISO 126 MW).
- Sapele Power Station, Delta State with the capacity of 4 x 112.5 MW (ISO 126 MW).
- Omoku Power Station, Rivers State with the capacity of 2 x 112.5 MW (ISO 126 MW).
- Ikot Abasi Power Station, Akwa Ibom with the capacity of 2 x 112.5 MW (ISO 126 MW) (replaced later by Ibom Power Station).

Together, the projects generated contracts worth $414,000,000 for the supply of turbines and electricity generation equipment to General Electric (GE). The primary turbine is GE 9E gas turbine with a nominal ISO rating of 126MW. After adjusting for site conditions, the capacity was set to 112.5 MW. The plants are low efficiency simple cycle but have provision for future extension to combined cycle.

Administration changes in 2007 interrupted funding for more than two years. The NIPP project includes 11 power plants and 4 FGN Power Stations:

- Alaoji Power Station, Abia State, combined cycle plant with the capacity of 4 x 112.5 MW (ISO 125 MW) and 2x steam 255 MW
- Omotosho II Power Station, Ondo State, with the capacity of 4 x 112.5 (ISO 125 MW)
- Olorunsogo II Power Station, Ogun State, combined cycle plant with the capacity of 4 x 125 MW and 2 x steam 125 MW
- Geregu II Power Station, Kogi State, with the capacity of 434 MW

Following the Afam V and Geregu I plants, Geregu II is now the third gas-turbine power plant to be constructed by Siemens in Nigeria as a turnkey project and completed on schedule. The scope of delivery supplied by Siemens for Geregu II included three SGT5-2000E gas turbines, three SGen5-100A generators, as well as all the electrical systems and the SPPA-T3000 control system.

The Ikot Abasi NIPP power plant has been replaced by Ibom Power, which is a 190 MW project of the Akwa Ibom State Government. The revised project involves large scale transmission projects across all of Nigeria which are crucial to ensure power distribution from generation plants to final customers.
