= Arnergy =

Nigerian solar power company

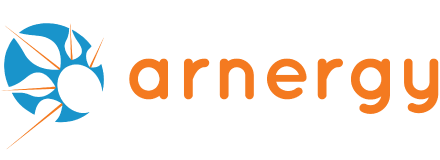
- Industry: Solar
- Founded: 2013; 13 years ago
- Founders: Femi Adeyemo & Kunle Odebunmi
- Headquarters: Lagos, Nigeria
- Area served: Nigeria
- Website: arnergy.com

Arnergy Solar Limited is a Nigerian solar power company based in Lagos, Nigeria. It provides energy for small businesses in Nigeria.

== History ==
The company was started in 2013 by Femi Adeyemo, the incumbent CEO, and Kunle Odebunmi from personal savings and capital.

In July 2015, Nigeria's Bank of Industry invested in the company to fund a project to provide rural communities with off-grid solar systems which was also supported by UNDP.

In December 2015, the Solar Nigeria Programme, part of the Department for International Development (DfID), granted a 100,000 Pounds (US$146,000) to expand the operations in Northern Nigeria.

In June 2019, Breakthrough Energy Ventures along with Norfund invested US$9 million in the company.

In December 2020, the Federal Government of Nigeria gave $9 million to provide solar energy to 20,000 micro, small and medium businesses in rural communities in the country.

In April 2025, Arnergy successfully closed an $18 million Series B funding round. The capital raise included a $3 million initial tranche in 2024 and a $15 million extension led by CardinalStone Capital Advisers (CCA). Other participants included the Bill Gates-backed Breakthrough Energy Ventures, British International Investment (BII), Norfund, and Shell-funded All On. This brought Arnergy's total capital raised to over $27 million. The company announced that the funds would be used to install an additional 12,000 solar systems across Nigeria by 2029.

== Recognition and award ==
In February 2021, it was recognized by Canada High Commissioner for their energy optimization efforts in Nigeria. By March of the same year, it received Africa Brand Award for its contribution in development of solar energy in Nigeria.
