= Seplat Petroleum Development Company =

Nigerian oil & gas company

Seplat Energy
- Type: Public
- Traded as: LSE: SEPL; NGX:SEPLAT
- ISIN: NGSEPLAT0008
- Industry: Oil and Gas
- Founded: 2009; 17 years ago
- Headquarters: Lagos, Nigeria
- Key people: Roger brown(CEO); Udoma Udo Udoma (chairman)
- Products: Crude oil, Natural gas
- Website: www.seplatenergy.com

Seplat Energy (formerly Seplat Petroleum Development Company) is a Nigerian oil & gas dual listed company listed on both the London and Nigerian Stock Exchanges with assets in the Niger Delta.

== History ==
Seplat was formed as Seplat Petroleum Development Company in June 2009 through the partnership of Shebah Petroleum Development Company Limited and Platform Petroleum Joint Ventures Limited to specifically pursue upstream oil and gas opportunities in Nigeria, and in particular divestment opportunities arising out of the incumbent Major IOC's portfolios.

In July 2010, SEPLAT acquired a 45 percent interest in, and was appointed operator of, three onshore producing oil and gas blocks in the Niger Delta (OMLs 4, 38 and 41). SEPLAT subsequently grew oil production to a peak rate of 85,200 barrels (13,550 m^{3}) of oil per day and had almost doubled its remaining reserves at the end of 2015. In June 2013, SEPLAT acquired an interest in the Umuseti/Igbuku marginal field area within OPL 283 and in February 2015 acquired interests in OML 53 and OML 55.

Alongside its oil business, the company has also developed its gas reserves. In 2015–16, SEPLAT installed and commissioned a new 375 million cu ft/d (10.6 million m^{3}/d) gas processing facility at its Oben hub, taking gross overall processing capacity to 525 million cu ft/d (14.9 million m^{3}/d).

On February 8, 2015, it was announced that Seplat had purchased stakes in two onshore Nigeria blocks from Chevron Nigeria for a combined $391.6 million.

Seplat changed its name from Seplat Petroleum Development Company to Seplat Energy in 2021.

In December 2024, Seplat finalised its $1.28 billion acquisition of Mobil Producing Nigeria Unlimited from ExxonMobil. This deal was initially stalled due to a legal challenge by the Nigerian National Petroleum Company (NNPC) in 2022, but was resolved after President Bola Ahmed Tinubu's intervention.

The acquisition added significant assets to Seplat's portfolio, including: 40% operated interest in OML 67, 68, 70, and 104, 40% operated interest in the Qua Iboe export terminal and the Yoho FSO, 51% operated interest in the Bonny River Terminal (BRT) NGL recovery plant and 9.6% participating interest in the Aneman-Kpono field. Approximately 1,000 staff and 500 contractors joined Seplat as part of the deal.
