= Simple cycle combustion turbine =

Typically used for jet engines or electric power generation

A simple-cycle combustion turbine (SCCT) is a type of gas turbine typically used in the power generation, aviation (jet engine), and oil and gas industries (for electricity generation and mechanical drives). The simple-cycle combustion turbine follows the Brayton Cycle and differs from a combined cycle operation in that it has only one power cycle (i.e. no provision for waste heat recovery).

== Advantages ==
There are several advantages of an SCCT. The primary advantage of a SCCT is the high power generated to weight (or size) ratio, when compared to alternatives.

Another advantage is the ability for it to quickly reach full power, unlike other baseload power plants that may have a minimum time of being online once started. This "minimum up" is a common term in the power industry when referring to this requirement. Therefore, SCCTs are usually used as peaking power plants, which can operate from several hours per day to a couple of dozen hours per year, depending on the electricity demand and the generating capacity of the region. In areas with a shortage of baseload and load following power plant capacity, a gas turbine power plant may regularly operate during most hours of the day and even into the evening. A typical large simple-cycle gas turbine may produce 100 to 300 megawatts of power and have 35–40% thermal efficiency. The most efficient turbines have reached 46% efficiency.

For power generation applications, the investment costs are cheaper than combined cycle combustion turbine plants (in 2003, the Energy Information Administration estimated that the cost of a combined cycle plant was US$500–550/kW, as opposed to the SCCT cost of US$389/kW), but at reduced efficiency. SCCTs require smaller capital investment than either coal or nuclear power plants and can be scaled to generate small or large amounts of power. Also, the actual construction process can take as little as several weeks to a few months, compared to years for base load power plants that require extensive plumbing and large waste heat dissipation systems.

== Disadvantages ==
A simple cycle combustion turbine has a lower thermal efficiency than a combined cycle machine. Although they may be less expensive to build, simple cycle combustion turbines, due to their low efficiency, cost more to run than most other plants. This results in increased cost per kWh during peak electrical loads. Compared to combined cycle NG turbines, the lower efficiency increases the amount of NG fuel required to produce the same amount of electricity.
