= China Geo-Engineering Corporation =

Chinese construction company

- Native name: 中国地质工程集团公司
- Company type: State-owned enterprise
- Headquarters: Beijing, China
- Owner: Chinese central government (100%)
- Parent: China Energy Conservation and Environmental Protection Group
- Subsidiaries: CGC International

China Geo-Engineering Corporation
- Simplified Chinese: 中国地质工程集团公司
- Traditional Chinese: 中國地質工程集團公司
- Literal meaning: China Geo-Engineering Group Corporation
Transcriptions

Alternative Chinese name
- Simplified Chinese: 中地集团
- Traditional Chinese: 中地集團
Transcriptions

China Geo-Engineering Corporation (abbreviated as CGC) is a Chinese construction company that ranks in the Engineering News Record annual compilation of construction firms as one of the 250 largest international contractors by sales, with international project revenue of $665.6 million in 2012.

The company has performed work on several water-related infrastructure projects across Africa. In 2005, it won a tender against a field of 10 companies and consortia in Mozambique to build the water supply network in the cities of Xai-Xai and Chokwe. In Zambia, the company worked on the Kabwe water and sanitation project, powering through the project despite delays by the Zambian government in disbursing counterparty funding. By the end of 2007, the government had moved to fund the 1 billion Zambian kwacha in delayed payments, an action praised by the Lusaka Times in an editorial as "a very good development". When the company started in Ghana in 2005, it started out drilling water holes before moving on to other water projects and infrastructure.

The Ghana branch of the company is well developed with, as of 2013, about 1000 employees, 800 of whom are local, and does about $50 million in business every year. It works on contracts for water, roads, and hospitals.
