= KRPC Kaduna Refinery =

Kaduna Refining and Petrochemical Company (KRPC)
- Type: Subsidiary
- Industry: Oil refining, petrochemicals
- Founded: 1980
- Headquarters: Kaduna, Nigeria
- Key people: Managing Director (position holder varies)
- Products: Premium Motor Spirit (PMS), Household Kerosene (HHK), Aviation Turbine Kerosene (ATK), Automotive Gas Oil (AGO), Liquefied Petroleum Gas (LPG), Fuel Oil, Lube Base Oils, Asphalt, Wax, Linear Alkyl Benzene (LAB)
- Owner: Nigerian National Petroleum Company Limited (NNPC Ltd.)

Kaduna Refining and Petrochemical Company (KRPC), also known as the Kaduna Refinery, is an oil refinery and petrochemical complex located along Kachia Road in Kaduna, Kaduna State, Nigeria. It is wholly owned by the Nigerian National Petroleum Company Limited (NNPC Ltd.) and it is one of the Nigeria's four state-owned refineries, alongside the two Port Harcourt refineries and the Warri Refinery.

Unlike Nigeria's other refineries, which process only crude oil into fuels, KRPC was designed with an additional petrochemical and lubricants complex, making it, as at the time of construction, one of the largest facilities of its kind in Nigeria and West Africa as a whole.

== History ==
The refinery was commissioned in 1980 to supply petroleum products to northern Nigeria, with an initial capacity of 50,000 barrels per day (bpd). Planning for the facility was carried out by the Dutch consulting firm King Wilkinson of The Hague in conjunction with engineers from the Nigerian National Petroleum Corporation, and construction was awarded to Chiyoda Chemical Engineering & Construction Company of Yokohama, Japan, in 1977.

In 1983, the refinery's capacity was expanded to 100,000 bpd through the addition of a second 50,000 bpd crude distillation train dedicated to the production of lubricating oils, and a fuels processing plant was commissioned the same year. A 30,000-metric-tonne-per-year petrochemical plant was added and commissioned in 1988. In 1986, the capacity of the original crude train was further expanded to 60,000 bpd, bringing the refinery's overall nameplate capacity to 110,000 bpd.

By the 2010s, the refinery's second crude distillation unit, which feeds the lubricants train, had ceased operating because its supporting utilities could no longer meet operational requirements.

=== Rehabilitation efforts ===
Like Nigeria's other government-owned refineries, KRPC fell into prolonged disrepair over the 2000s and 2010s, and NNPC undertook repeated turnaround maintenance programmes intended to restore it to full operation. In March 2023, Daewoo E&C Nigeria Limited began a contract for quick-fix repairs at the refinery, scheduled to run for 24 months.

In January 2025, NNPC Ltd. stated that the Kaduna Refinery, along with the second Port Harcourt refinery, was undergoing a comprehensive overhaul intended to bring both plants up to world-class standards, describing the work as going beyond conventional turnaround maintenance. The following month, NNPC group CEO Mele Kyari said the refinery had reached more than 60 percent mechanical completion and was expected to come on stream later that year.

In August 2024, KRPC managing director Mustafa Sugungun told a Senate ad hoc committee on petroleum downstream that rehabilitation was around 40 percent complete and that the plant was expected to begin operating at 60 percent of nameplate capacity by the end of 2024, with full capacity to follow within a year.

Despite these projections, the refinery remained non-operational into mid-2025. In May 2025, the Petroleum Products Retail Outlets Owners Association of Nigeria (PETROAN) criticised the repeated delays and called on NNPC to appoint a substantive managing director and provide a definite completion timeline. In October 2025, NNPC Ltd. announced that it had begun a technical and commercial review of the Kaduna refinery together with the Port Harcourt and Warri refineries to assess their operational and financial viability, noting that none of the three had produced fuel at commercial scale in over a decade despite a combined nameplate capacity of about 445,000 bpd. In November 2025, NNPC GCEO Bayo Ojulari acknowledged that the Kaduna, Warri, and Port Harcourt refineries were operating well below international standards, and NNPC subsequently set a June 2026 deadline to select private technical partners to overhaul all three plants.

== Facilities and products ==
The refinery's fuels train uses two crude distillation units. The first was designed to process 50,000 bpd of a blend of Escravos and Forcados crude oil and was later revamped to 60,000 bpd; the second, larger unit feeds the lubricants complex. The plant also imports heavier crude oil for the production of lube base oil, asphalt, and waxes.

Products historically produced at KRPC include:

- Premium Motor Spirit (PMS)
- Household and aviation kerosene
- Liquefied Petroleum Gas (LPG)
- Automotive Gas Oil (AGO/diesel)
- Low and high pour fuel oil
- Lube base oils and hydro-finished wax
- Asphalt
- Linear Alkyl Benzene (LAB) and other petrochemical products such as benzene, toluene, and normal paraffins

== Ownership and management ==
KRPC operates as a wholly owned subsidiary of NNPC Ltd. (formerly the Nigerian National Petroleum Corporation), in the same manner as the other state refineries.

== See also ==
- Port Harcourt Refining Company
- Warri Refinery
- NNPC Limited
- Dangote Refinery
- Petroleum industry in Nigeria
