= Ubeji Community =

Ubeji Community is an Itsekiri community located in the Warri South Local Government Area of Delta State, Nigeria. Ubeji community is near the Warri Refining and Petrochemicals Company (WRPC or Warri Refinery) in Warri, Warri South and as such, suffers huge environmental pollution. It is home to a large number of Itsekiris, it is a Suburb of the City of Warri It shares boundaries with Ifie Community, Aja-Etan Community, Ijala-Ikenren Community, Ekpan Community, etc.

The Olu of Warri is the King of Warri Kingdom and as such, he reigns over Ubeji Community like all other communities in Warri Kingdom.
