= Port Harcourt Refining Company =

Crude oil refinery of Nigeria

Port Harcourt Refining Company Limited
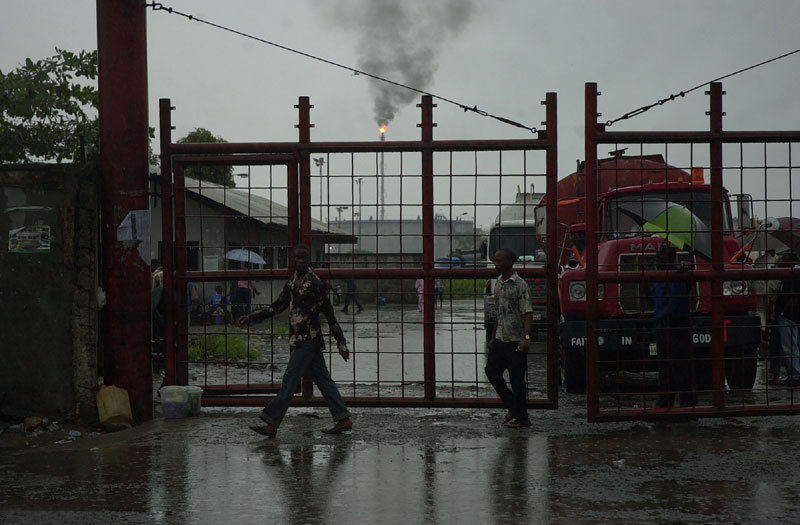
- The Port Harcourt Refining Company Ltd.
- Type: State-owned
- Industry: Oil and gas
- Founded: 1965
- Headquarters: Port Harcourt, Nigeria
- Area served: Nigeria
- Key people: Ahmed Dikko (Managing Director), Mr. Babatunde Sofowora (Executive Director Services), Mr.Reginald Udeh (Executive Director Finance)
- Products: Petroleum and derived products
- Owner: Nigerian National Petroleum Corporation
- Website: www.nnpcgroup.com/nnpcbusiness/subsidiaries/phrc.aspx

The Port Harcourt Refining Company, (abbreviated PHRC), is a Nigeria-based oil and gas company primarily specializing in the refining of crude oil into petroleum products. It is headquartered in Port Harcourt metropolitan area of Rivers State, southeastern Nigeria. The company is a subsidiary of the Nigerian National Petroleum Corporation (NNPC).

Located in Alesa Eleme just to the southeast of Port Harcourt, the company operates two oil refineries, including an old plant commissioned in 1965 that can process 60,000 barrels (9,500 m^{3}) per stream day, as well as the new plant commissioned in 1989, which has a capacity of 150,000 barrels (24,000 m^{3}) per stream day. Both oil refineries possess a combined capacity of 210,000 barrels (33,000 m^{3}) per stream day.

The refinery in Port Harcourt, along with other state-owned refineries in the country, has only utilised a fraction of its capacity in recent decades due to inefficient processes and a lack of maintenance. This has led to Nigeria, Africa's largest crude oil producer, becoming increasingly reliant on imports of refined petroleum products.

In March 2021, the Nigerian government approved expenditure of GBP 1.08 billion (USD 1.5 billion) for the refurbishment and modernisation of the refinery complex in Port Harcourt. The main contract for the modernisation of the refinery was also awarded in the same month.

The renovation project for the refinery in Port Harcourt, which will be carried out in three phases, is scheduled for completion by 2025.

== Old plant ==
The old refinery comprises a crude distillation unit (CDU), a catalytic reforming unit (CRU) and a liquefied petroleum gas (LPG) plant.

== New plant ==
The new refinery in Port Harcourt includes a crude distillation unit (CDU), a vacuum distillation unit (VDU), a naphtha hydrotreating unit (NHTU), a catalytic reforming unit (CRU), a continuous catalyst regeneration unit (CCR), a paraffin hydrotreating unit, a fluid catalytic cracking (FCC) unit and a dimersol unit for converting propylene into a petrol blend product. (You can find a comprehensive description of most of these units in the article about the Dangote refinery in Lekki here.)

There is also a butamer isomerisation plant, an alkylation plant, a hydrogen purification plant, a fuel gas vaporiser and plants for treating acidic water and lye.

== The refinery complex ==
The refinery complex has an 84 MW gas fired electric power plant, and four boilers each with a steam generation capacity of 120 tonnes (t) per hour.

The refinery products include petrol, diesel, liquefied petroleum gas, paraffin for aircraft and households, low-viscosity fuel oil (LPFO) and high-viscosity fuel oil (HPFO).

== Recent Developments ==
On May 24, 2025, NNPC announced the shut down the Port Harcourt refinery for planned maintenance, merely six months after it claimed to have resumed operations. No timeline or scope provided for the shutdown following the latest round of repair costing $1.5B.

In an August 29, 2025 meeting with leadership of Petroleum and Natural Gas Senior Staff Association of Nigeria (PENGASSAN) in Abuja, the group CEO of the Nigerian National Petroleum Company Limited (NNPCL), Mr Bayo Ojulari, who took office on April 2, 2025, stated that a review after his arrival showed that the refinery was losing between $300m and $500m million each month it operated. He claimed that only about 40% equivalent value of the 50,000 barrels (per day?) of crude inputs were realized as refined output products, a significant efficiency gap. Operations were thus suspended until a plan for profitability could be developed. Several reports in fact dispute whether the facility ever really produced saleable products after its repairs before it was shut down again, with petroleum marketers and the local community saying NNPCL was misstating the refinery's status.

=== Critiques ===
Since about 2013, the government has reported spending over $27 billion trying to fix its three “moribund” refineries which remain not operating.

Meanwhile, the 650,000 barrels per day (bpd) Dangote Petroleum Refinery was set up with about $20 billion and is already operating (compared to at least $28B spent on repairing the combined refining capacity of 445,000 bpd of NNPC assets ).

== See also ==
- Warri Refinery
- Dangote Refinery
