= Maikanti Baru =

Nigerian engineer (1959–2020)

Group Managing Director of the Nigerian National Petroleum Corporation
- In office 4 July 2016 – 7 July 2019
- Preceded by: Ibe Kachikwu
- Succeeded by: Mele Kyari

Managing Director Carlson Services (UK) Limited
- In office 7 December 2004 – 25 January 2007

NNPC Chief Technical Negotiator West African Gas Pipeline project.
- In office July 1999 – April 2004

Personal details
- Born: 7 July 1959 Misau, Bauchi State
- Died: 29 May 2020 (aged 60)
- Education: Ahmadu Bello University; University of Sussex

Maikanti Kachalla Baru (7 July 1959 – 29 May 2020) was a Nigerian engineer, crude oil marketer and the 18th Group Managing Director of the Nigeria's state oil firm, Nigerian National Petroleum Corporation (NNPC). He served in the position from July 2016 to July 2019 and had previously served as the Group General Manager (GGM) of National Petroleum Investment Management Services. Baru was a fellow of Nigerian Society of Engineers and Nigerian Institution of Mechanical Engineers.

== Early life and education ==
Baru was born in July 1959 in Misau, Bauchi State. He attended Federal Government College, Jos for his secondary education where he graduated in 1978. He obtained his bachelor of engineering degree from Ahmadu Bello University in 1982 and a doctorate in Computer Aided Engineering from the University of Sussex.

== Career and death ==
Baru worked with the Jos Steel Rolling Company for three years from 1988 before he left to join the Nigerian National Petroleum Corporation in 1991 as an Engineering Manager. He held various positions within the organization including general manager, Gas Development Division from 1997 to 1999 and briefly as executive director, operations Nigeria Gas Company (NGC) in 1999. From 1999 to 2004, he served as the Chief Technical Negotiator on the West African Gas Pipeline project. He was also a GGM, National Petroleum Investment Management Services. He once served as GGM, Liquefied Natural Gas.

Baru was appointed as the 18th Group Managing Director of NNPC, on 4 July 2016.

On reaching the statutory age of 60, he retired on 7 July 2019 and was succeeded by Mele Kyari.

Baru died on Friday, 29 May 2020 from COVID-19.
