= China National Chemical Engineering =

Chinese state-owned engineering and construction company

China National Chemical Engineering Co. Ltd. (CNCEC)
- Company type: State-owned
- Industry: Construction
- Headquarters: Beijing, People's Republic of China
- Parent: China National Chemical Engineering Group Corp.
- Website: www.cncec.com.cn

China National Chemical Engineering Co., Ltd. (CNCEC) is a Chinese engineering and construction company specializing in chemical engineering, petrochemical projects, industrial infrastructure, and related services. The company is one of the world's largest engineering contractors.

The parent company of China National Chemical Engineering Co., Ltd. (SSE: 601117) is China National Chemical Engineering Group Corp., a state-owned enterprise supervised by the State-owned Assets Supervision and Administration Commission of the State Council.

== History ==
China National Chemical Engineering Group Corp. was established in 1984 through the consolidation of several Chinese chemical industry construction and design entities under the Ministry of Chemical Industry. The company became one of China's principal engineering contractors for chemical plants, fertilizer facilities, petrochemical complexes, and industrial infrastructure projects during the country's period of rapid industrialization.

During the 1990s and 2000s, CNCEC expanded internationally, undertaking engineering and procurement contracts across the Middle East, Africa, and Central Asia. The company's overseas activities grew alongside broader Chinese overseas infrastructure and industrial investment initiatives.

In 2008, the operating subsidiary China National Chemical Engineering Co., Ltd. was restructured as a joint-stock company. The company was subsequently listed on the Shanghai Stock Exchange in 2010.

By the 2020s, CNCEC had become one of the world's largest engineering and construction contractors by revenue, with major operations in industrial engineering, coal chemical projects, oil refining, and infrastructure construction.

In November 2020, U.S. president Donald Trump signed Executive Order 13959, restricting American investment in 31 companies including China National Chemical Engineering Group Co Ltd.

== Projects ==
- In May 2012, CNCEC announced a deal with the government of the United Arab Emirates worth approximately US$2.95 billion to complete the National House Scheme over five years.
- CNCEC participated in the construction of the Dangote Refinery in Nigeria, one of the world's largest single-train oil refineries. The company was involved in engineering and construction work for parts of the refinery and associated petrochemical facilities.
- In January 2024, the Iraqi government announced the start of a US$2 billion project to build a new residential city west of Baghdad, involving CNCEC and two other companies.
