= Austin Avuru =

Nigerian Geologist

Austin Avuru is a Nigerian geologist, entrepreneur, and oil and gas executive. He is the co-founder and former Chief Executive Officer (CEO) of Seplat Petroleum Development Company. In April 2025, he was appointed a non-executive director of the Nigerian National Petroleum Company (NNPC) by President Bola Tinubu.

== Early Life and background ==
Avuru was born on August 17, 1958 in Ipetu Ijesa.

== Education ==
Austin obtained his first school leaving certificate at Orogun Grammar School. He graduated with a Bachelor's degree in Geology from the University of Nigeria Nsukka in 1980, where he was the best overall student. In 1983, he completed a four-month course at the Petroleum Training Institute (PTI), Effurun, Warri, where he emerged as the best overall student in Petroleum Engineering, Geology, and Geophysics. He is a graduate of the Owner/President Management (OPM) program at Harvard Business School.

== Career ==
Austin Avuru began his career in 1980 at the Nigerian National Petroleum Corporation (NNPC), where he held various positions including Wellsite Geologist, Production Seismologist, and Reservoir Engineer over a 12-year period.

In 1992, he joined Allied Energy Resources, serving as Exploration Manager and later as Technical Manager for a decade.

In 2002, Avuru founded Platform Petroleum Limited and served as its Managing Director. During this time, he played a pivotal role in the development of Nigeria's local content policy, chairing the technical subcommittee that drafted the policy blueprint which became the Nigerian Content Act of 2010.

In 2009, he co-founded Seplat Petroleum Development Company and was appointed as its Chief Executive Officer (CEO) on May 1, 2010. Under his leadership, Seplat achieved significant growth, including dual listing on both the Nigerian and London Stock Exchanges. Avuru retired as CEO in July 2020 and continued to contribute to the company in a non-executive capacity.

In 2025, he was appointed as a non-executive director of the Nigerian National Petroleum Company Limited (NNPC), by President Bola Tinubu.

== Publications and Recognitions ==
Austin has written books including: Politics, Economics and the Nigerian Petroleum Industry. He co- authored a handbook: Nigeria’s oil industry, including Nigerian Petroleum Business.

He was recognized with the Ernst & Young Entrepreneur of the Year award in 2013 for Nigeria and West Africa.
