= NNPC =

National Oil Company of Nigeria

Nigerian National Petroleum Company

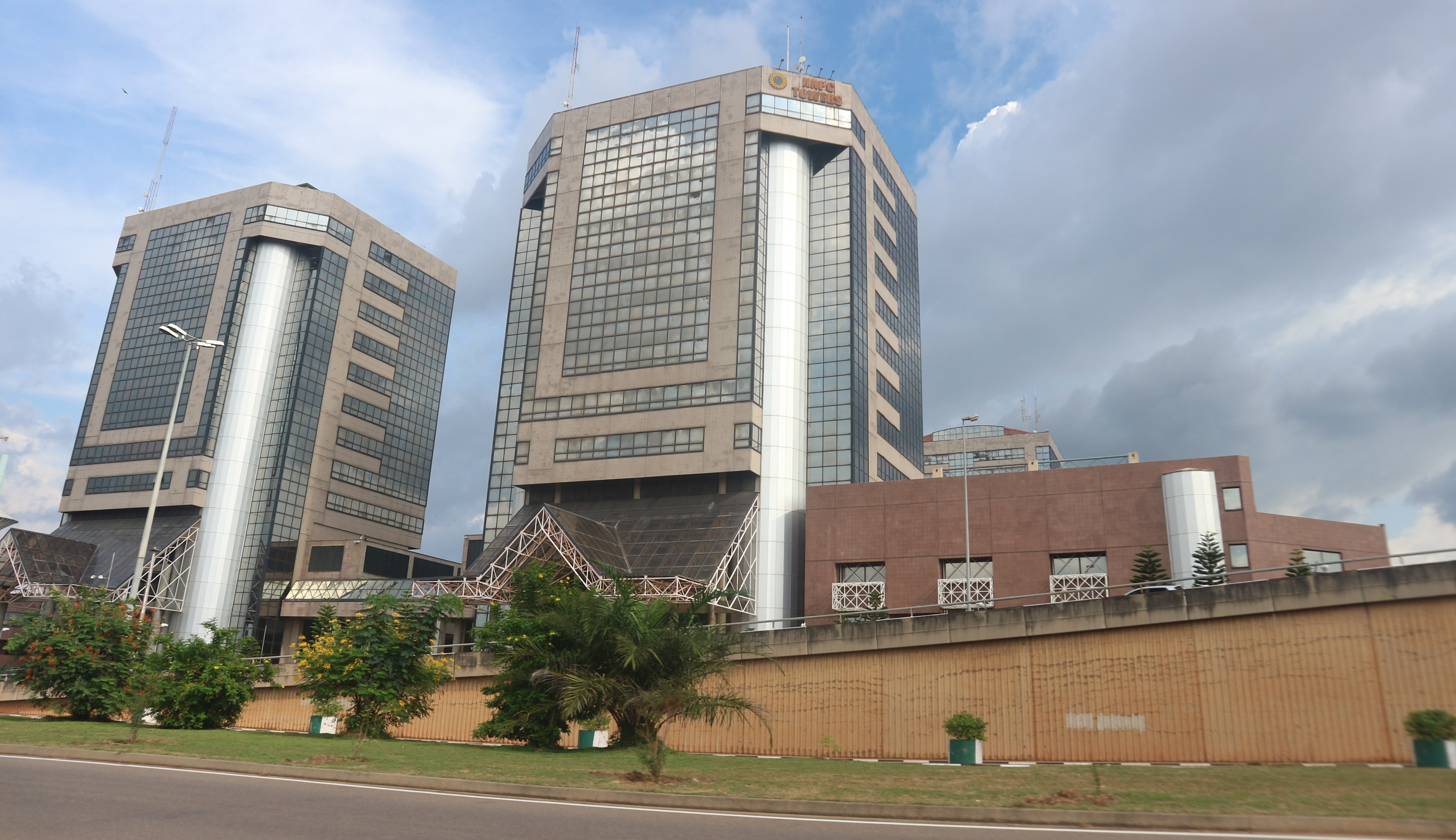
- The NNPC Towers
- Type: Government owned
- Industry: Oil and gas
- Founded: 1977; 49 years ago
- Headquarters: NNPC Towers, Herbert Macaulay Way, CBD, Abuja, FCT, Nigeria
- Key people: Bayo Ojulari (GCEO); Ahmadu Musa Kida (board chairperson)
- Products: Crude Oil; Gas; Petroleum product; Petrochemical
- Website: nnpcgroup.com

The Nigerian National Petroleum Company (NNPC) Limited is a state-owned oil company in Nigeria. Still a fully owned government company, it was transformed from a corporation into a limited liability company in July 2022. NNPC Limited is the only entity licensed to operate in the country's petroleum industry. It partners with foreign oil companies to explore Nigeria's fossil fuel resources. The NNPC, with an asset of $153B (USD), is the largest national oil company in Africa. The company boasts of extensive infrastructure and investment in the downstream, midstream and upstream of the Nigerian petroleum industry.

== History ==
NNPC by law manages the joint venture between the Nigerian federal government and a number of foreign multinational corporations, which include Royal Dutch Shell, Agip, ExxonMobil, TotalEnergies, Chevron, and Texaco (now merged with Chevron). Through collaboration with these companies, the Nigerian government conducts petroleum exploration and production.

The NNPC Towers, located in Abuja, serves as the headquarters of the Nigerian National Petroleum Corporation (NNPC). The complex consists of four identical towers and is situated on Herbert Macaulay Way in the Central Business District of Abuja. NNPC also maintains zonal offices in cities including Lagos, Kaduna, Benin City, Port Harcourt, and Warri. Additionally, it operates an international office in London, United Kingdom.

In October 2019, NNPC announced the signing of a $2.5 billion pre-payment agreement with Nigeria LNG to fund upstream gas development projects.

In December 2021, the Federal Government of Nigeria and NNPC Ltd signed a ₦621 billion Memorandum of Understanding to finance the construction of critical road infrastructure across the country.

Following passage of a Petroleum Industry Act in August 2021, NNPC now operates as a commercial entity without relying on government funding and direct controls. NNPC was established as a limited liability corporation in the hopes that a private entity will find it easier to access international capital markets. The company will continue to ensure energy security in Nigeria. On 27 June 2024, it delivered its first DES LNG Cargo at Futtsu, Japan.

== Leadership ==
On 2 April 2025, President Bola Ahmed Tinubu dissolved the board of NNPC Limited and appointed Bayo Ojulari as the new group chief executive officer(GCEO). Ahmadu Musa Kida was appointed the new non-executive chairman, replacing Chief Pius Akinyelure.

Subsequently, on 22 May 2025, President Bola Ahmed Tinubu officially inaugurated the new board and executive leadership at a ceremony held at Aso Rock Villa, Abuja. The 11-member board comprises representatives from Nigeria’s six geopolitical zones, including:

- Non-Executive Chairman: Ahmadu Musa Kida
- Group Chief Executive Officer: Bashir Ojulari

Board Members:

- Adedapo Segun (North West)
- Bello Rabiu (North West)
- Yusuf Usman (North East)
- Babs Omotowa (North Central), former Managing Director of Nigeria Liquefied Natural Gas
- Austin Avuru (South-South), Non-Executive Director
- David Ige (South-West)
- Henry Obih (South-East)
- Lydia Jafiya, Permanent Secretary of the Federal Ministry of Finance (Ministry’s representative)
- Aminu Ahmed (Ministry of Petroleum Resources representative)

The Group Chief Executive Officer, Bayo Ojulari, has since resumed his duties and represented NNPCL at various official events, including an empowerment program for National Youth Service Corps (NYSC) members.

== Organisational structure ==
The NNPC's business operations are managed through Strategic Business and Corporate Services Units (SBUs/CSUs) in diverse locations across Nigeria.

The NNPC Group comprises the NNPC Board, the group managing director's office, Five directorates as listed below. Each of the directorate is headed by an executive vice president (EVP). Its divisions are headed by chiefs, while its subsidiary companies are headed by managing directors. NNPC has several subsidiaries, two partly owned subsidiaries and 16 associated companies.

Directorates:

- Upstream
- Downstream
- Gas, Power and New Energy
- Finance
- Business Services

Strategic Business & Corporate Services Units:

SBU's/CSU's	SBU's/CSU's
NNPC Upstream Investment Management Services (NUIMS)	NNPC Trading Limited (NTL)
Corporate Secretariat, Legal Division	NNPC Exploration & Production Limited (NEPL)
Strategy and Sustainability	NNPC Energy Services Limited (Enserv)
Corporate Communications	NNPC Retail Limited (NRL)
Human Capital Management	NNPC Gas Infrastructure Company (NGIC)
Information Technology Division	NNPC Gas Marketing Company Limited (NGML)
NNPC Foundation	Kaduna Refining & Petrochemicals Company
Leadership Academy	Warri Refining & Petrochemicals Company
Financial Controller	Port Harcourt Refining Company PHRC
Treasury	Gas & Power Investments Services
	NNPC Pipeline & Storage Company (NPSC)
	NNPC Properties
	NNPC Shipping Limited
	NNPC Engineering & Technical Company (NETCO)
	NNPC Health Maintenance Organization (HMO)
	NNPC Medical Services Limited (NMSL)
	NNPC Pension Fund

NNPC acquired Oando's OVH Energy in September 2022 and took over its 380 filling stations.

== Installations ==
NNPC has sole responsibility for upstream and downstream developments. In 1988, the corporation was commercialised into 11 strategic business units, covering the entire spectrum of oil industry operations: exploration and production, gas development, refining, distribution, petrochemicals, engineering, and commercial investments.

== Legal premise ==
According to the Nigerian constitution, all minerals, gas, and oil the country possesses are legally the property of the Nigerian Federal Government. The revenue gained by the NNPC accounts for 76% of federal government revenue and 40% of the entire country's GDP. As of 2000, oil and gas exports account for 98% of Nigerian export earnings.

== Transparency at the NNPC ==
=== NNPC Bags Transparency Award ===
The efforts of the Mallam Mele Kyari-led Management of the Nigerian National Petroleum Corporation (NNPC) to entrench the culture of transparency in the system have begun to receive recognition with the Corporation named as the “Government Agency of the Year 2020 (Transparency)” by the New Telegraph.

=== NNPC, NEITI Set Up Joint Committee to Strengthen Transparency ===
In keeping with the Transparency, Accountability, and Performance Excellence (TAPE) agenda of the Mele Kyari-led management of the Nigerian National Petroleum Corporation (NNPC), the corporation and the Nigeria Extractive Industries Transparency Initiative (NEITI) have set up a joint committee to deepen collaboration in order to promote transparency in the Oil and Gas Industry.

Speaking at the inauguration of the NNPC-NEITI Joint Committee on Mainstreaming and Remedial Issues, group managing director of NNPC, Kyari, said the joint committee was part of efforts to further deepen the robust history of collaboration that both organisations had enjoyed over the years.

He said NNPC was in complete sync with the activities of NEITI because it was the right of the over 200 million Nigerians who are the shareholders of the corporation to know everything about the operations of their company.

=== Mele Kyari: Matching action with words 365 days on ===
Stakeholders continue to commend the commitment and speed with which the NNPC boss, Mele Kyari, has been carrying out his assignment.

According to the head of Nigeria's extractive industry watchdog NEITI, Waziri Adio, the decision of NNPC to make public its audited accounts on its website for the first time in its history is laudable. Just as the executive director of the global Extractive Industries Transparency International's (EITI), Mr. Mark Robinson, commended the corporation for setting a new standard of reporting.

Also, Publicity Secretary of the Nigerian Association of Petroleum Explorationists (NAPE), Mr. Lateef Amodu, said, in one year, Kyari has been able to stabilise the industry through robust policies that have helped stakeholders make informed investment decisions.

NNPC Limited is ranked seventh (7th position) on LinkedIn's 25 best companies to work in Nigeria in 2023.

== See also ==
- Warri Refinery
- Dangote Refinery
