= Mele Kyari =

Nigerian geologist

Group chief executive officer of the NNPC Limited
- In office 7 July 2019 – 2 April 2025
- President: Muhammadu Buhari; Bola Tinubu
- Preceded by: Maikanti Baru
- Succeeded by: Bayo Ojulari

Nigerian National Representative, Organization of Petroleum Exporting Countries (OPEC)
- Incumbent
- Assumed office 2018

Group General Manager, Crude Oil Marketing Division, NNPC
- In office 2015–2019

Personal details
- Born: 8 January 1965 (age 61) Nigeria, Maiduguri, Borno State
- Education: University of Maiduguri
- Occupation: Public Servant

Mele Kolo Kyari OFR (born 8 January 1965) is a Nigerian geologist, crude oil marketer and was the Group Chief executive officer (GCEO) of the Nigerian National Petroleum company limited (NNPC Limited) from 2019 to 2025. Before this appointment, Kyari was the Group General Manager, Crude Oil Marketing Division of the NNPC and the Nigerian National Representative at the Organization of Petroleum Exporting Countries (OPEC) since 2018.

== Early life and education ==
Kyari was born on 8 January 1965 in Maiduguri, Borno State. He attended Government Community Secondary School Biu in Borno State between 1977 and 1982. In 1987, he obtained his Bachelor of Science (BSc) in geology and earth science from the University of Maiduguri.

== Career ==
After the retirement of Maikanti Baru from the corporation on 7 July 2019, Kyari was appointed by the administration of President Muhammadu Buhari as the 19th GMD of the Nigerian National Petroleum Corporation. In 1991, he joined NNPC Processing Geophysicist with Integrated Data Services Limited. In 1991, he started his career with the Department of Geological Survey of Nigeria as Field Geologist. He worked as an Exploration Geophysicist with the National Petroleum Investment Management Services (NAPIMS) in 1998. In 2007, Kyari headed the Production Sharing Contracts Management in Crude Oil Marketing Division (COMD). In 2014, he became the General Manager, Crude Oil Stock Management while in 2015 he was promoted to the post of Group General Manager, COMD. He's the focal person for the Open Government Initiative, the initiative helps the government to track the buyer and seller of crude oil. On 13 May 2018, he became the Nigerian National Representative at OPEC. While celebrating 60 years, he reflected on his progress how he journeyed from being an Almajiri (Tsangaya) boy to NNPCL boss.

== Corruption allegations and misconduct ==
The Oduduwa Transparency Network alleged that Mele Kyari funnel stolen refinery funds into the MSM Groups $2.4 billions cement manufacturing venture. On 6 August 2025 OTN president Mahmud Adebayo accused Kyari and his associates of using his in-law company MSM Group as a front to launder $2.8 billion meant for the rehabilitation of nigerias Port Harcourt, Warri, and Kaduna refineries. Adebayo also highlighted MSM Group sudden rise, particularly its $2.4 billion deal with Kebbi State government to build a three million metric ton per annum cement plant, which was announced by Chairman MSM Group Alhaji Muazam Mairawani who was a rent seekers who benefited from the porosity of his father in law Mele Kyari, his MSM Group has no any business operations, asset and income.

The Federal High Court Abuja in has ordered the temporary freezing his four Jaiz Bank Accounts over allegations on fraud. Mele Kyari is under investigated in offences of conspiracy, abuses of office and money laundering. The account number: 0017922724 Jaiz Bank and another Jaiz Bank account number: 0018575055 with account name: Guwori Community Development. The EFCC revealed that 661,464,601.50 naira (Six hundred and sixty one million four hundred and sixty four thousand) which suspected to be proceeds of unlawful activities in four different accounts belongs to Mele Kyari. The EFCC revealed over 80 billion has been traced to the personal accounts of Mele Kyari. On 23 April 2025 The National Transparency Network demand probe of Mele Kyari, the group condemned the lack of action since Kyari's removal and questioned the $2billion debt to Matrix Energy being repaid with crude oil allocation.

== Awards and recognition ==
- Order of the Federal Republic (OFR): In October 2022, President Muhammadu Buhari conferred a national honour of the Order of the Federal Republic (OFR) on Kyari.
- Outstanding Employer of The Year 2022 Award: Kyari was named the outstanding employer of the year 2022 by the Trade Union Congress of Nigeria (TUC) in April 2023.

== See also ==
- NNPC Limited
