= Trimethylpentane =

Trimethylpentane may refer to:

- 2,2,3-Trimethylpentane
- 2,2,4-Trimethylpentane
- 2,3,3-Trimethylpentane
- 2,3,4-Trimethylpentane
