= Alkylation unit =

Component of a petroleum refinery

An alkylation unit (alky) is one of the conversion processes used in petroleum refineries. It is used to convert isobutane and low-molecular-weight alkenes (primarily a mixture of propene and butenes) into alkylate, a high octane gasoline component. The process occurs in the presence of an acid such as sulfuric acid (H_{2}SO_{4}) or hydrofluoric acid (HF) as catalyst. Depending on the acid used, the unit is called a sulfuric acid alkylation unit (SAAU) or hydrofluoric acid alkylation unit (HFAU). In short, the alky produces a high-quality gasoline blending stock by combining two shorter hydrocarbon molecules into one longer chain gasoline-range molecule by mixing isobutane with a light olefin such as propylene or butylene from the refinery's fluid catalytic cracking unit (FCCU) in the presence of an acid catalyst.

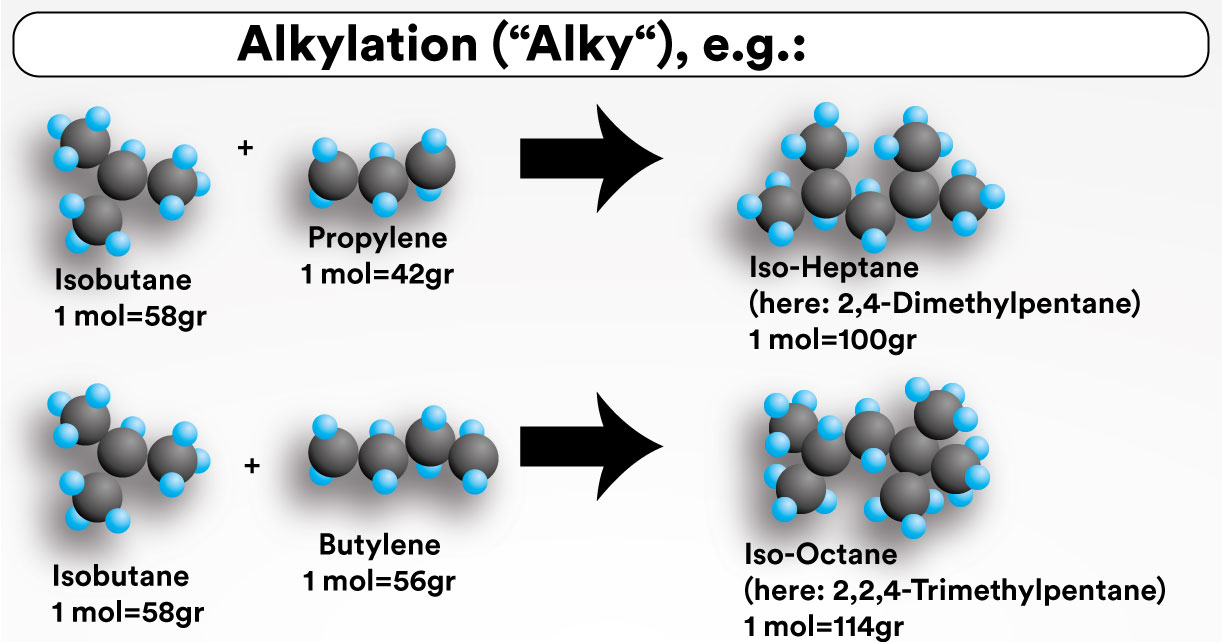
The two main chemical processes in the alkylation unit

Since crude oil generally contains only 10–40% of hydrocarbon constituents in the gasoline range, refineries typically use an FCCU to convert high molecular weight hydrocarbons into smaller and more volatile compounds, which are then converted into liquid gasoline-size hydrocarbons. Byproducts of the FCC process also include other low molecular-weight alkenes and iso-paraffin molecules which are not desirable. Alkylation transforms these byproducts into larger iso-paraffin molecules with a high octane number.

The product of the unit, the alkylate, is composed of a mixture of high-octane, branched-chain paraffinic hydrocarbons (mostly trimethylpentanes). Alkylate is a premium gasoline blending stock because it has exceptional antiknock properties and is clean burning. The octane number of the alkylate depends mainly upon the kind of alkenes used and upon operating conditions. For example, isooctane results from combining isobutylene with isobutane and has an octane rating of 100 by definition. There are other products in the alkylate effluent, however, so the octane rating will vary accordingly.

== Capacity installed and available technologies ==
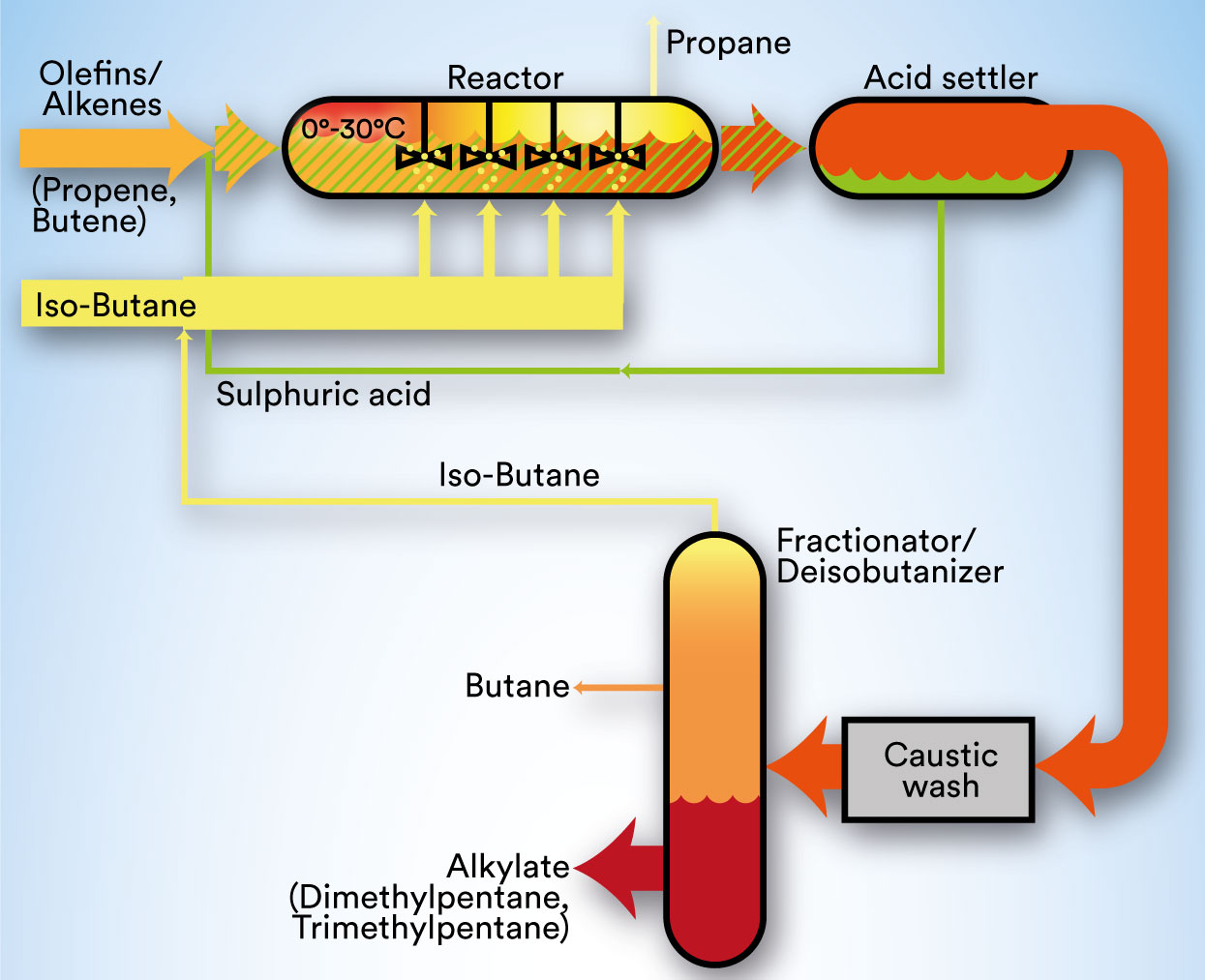
Alkylation unit in a refinery, line width corresponds approximately to the mass flow (SAAU technology)

The first alkylation units entered in service in 1940. In 2009 around 1,600,000 barrels per day of capacity were installed worldwide, with an equal share of 800,000 barrels per day for SAAU and HFAU technologies. On the 1st January 2016 according to the Oil & Gas Journal the worldwide installed alkylation capacity was 2,056,035 barrels per day. Since 2009 over 90% of the additional installed capacity was based on SAAU technology.

According to the Oil & Gas Journal on the 1st January 2016 there were 121 refineries operated in US with an overall capacity of 18,096,987 barrels per day. These refineries had 1,138,460 barrels per day of alkylation capacity.

Alkylate is a component of choice in gasoline, because it is free of aromatics and olefins. About 11% of the gasoline winter pool in the U.S. is made up of alkylate. In the gasoline summer pool, the content of alkylate can be as high as 15% because lower Reid vapor pressure (RVP) reduces the possibility to blend butane.

For safety reasons, SAAU is the prevalent current technology of choice. Indeed, in 1996 around 60% of the installed capacity was based on HF, but since then this ratio has been reducing because during the last decade on 10 new alkylation units commissioned, more than 8 of them were SAAU.

The two major licensors (sharing a similar share of the market) of the HFAU process were UOP and ConocoPhillips, which have been combined as UOP under the ownership of Honeywell. The main technology used for the SAAU is the STRATCO process licensed by DuPont, recently divested into privately held Elessent Clean Technologies. This is followed by the EMRE technology owned by ExxonMobil. From the mid-2000s to the mid-2010s, in excess of 85% of the SAAU capacity added worldwide has utilized Elessent's STRATCO technology.

== Catalysts ==
The availability of a suitable catalyst is also an important factor in deciding whether to build an alkylation plant.

=== Sulfuric acid ===
In a sulfuric acid (H_{2}SO_{4}) alky, significant volumes of the acid are used. Access to a suitable plant is required for the supply of fresh acid and the disposition of spent acid. Constructing a sulfuric acid plant specifically to support an alkylation unit has a significant impact on both the initial requirements for capital and ongoing costs of operation. It is possible to install a WSA Process unit to regenerate the spent acid. No drying of the gas takes place, which means no loss of acid, no acidic waste material, and no heat is lost in process gas reheating. The selective condensation in the WSA condenser ensures that the regenerated fresh acid will be 98% weight, even with the humid process gas. It is possible to combine spent acid regeneration with disposal of hydrogen sulfide by using the hydrogen sulfide as a fuel.

=== Hydrofluoric acid ===
The typical hydrofluoric acid (HF) alkylation unit requires far less acid than a sulfuric acid unit to achieve the same volume of alkylate. The HF process only creates a small amount of organofluorine side products which are continuously removed from the reactor and the consumed HF is replenished. HF alky units are also capable of processing a wider range of light-end feedstocks with propylenes and butylenes, and produce alkylate with a higher octane rating than sulfuric plants. However, extreme caution is required when working with or around HF. Due to its hazardous nature, the acid is produced at very few locations and transportation is stringently managed and regulated.

=== Solid acids ===
Research in the area of a solid catalyst for alkylation has been ongoing for many years. Numerous patents exist for different catalysts, catalyst supports, and processes. Lewis acids will catalyze the alkylation reaction (alkylation of isobutane with olefins was discovered using aluminium chloride promoted with HCl). Several of the current preferred solid catalysts use a salt of HF: either boron trifluoride (BF_{3}) or antimony pentafluoride (SbF_{5}). Since every alkylation process produces heavy polymers, solid catalysts have the tendency to foul quickly. Therefore, solid catalyst processes have two major hurdles to overcome: catalyst life and catalyst regeneration.

Solid alkylation catalyst technology was first commercialized on August 18, 2015, with the successful start-up of an alky unit at the Wonfull Refinery in Shandong Province, China. The unit uses the AlkyClean® process technology jointly developed by Albemarle Corporation, CB&I and Neste Oil, and has a capacity of 2,700 barrels per stream day of alkylate production. The AlkyClean process, together with Albemarle's AlkyStar catalyst produces high-quality alkylate product without the use of liquid acid catalysts in the alkylate manufacturing process.

=== Ionic liquids ===
An alternative to using HF and H_{2}SO_{4} as alkylation catalysts is the use of ionic liquid (IL). ILs are liquid salts that have melting points below 100 °C. They exhibit strong acid properties, so they can be used as acid catalysis without using conventional liquid acids. Ionic liquids are salts in liquid state, composed mostly of ions that convert C4 paraffins and other olefins into excellent gasoline-range blending products.

Many parameters are available for fine-tuning IL properties for specific applications, and the choice of cation and anion affects the IL's physical properties, such as melting point, viscosity, density, water solubility, and reactivity. Chloroaluminate IL has been studied in the literature for its ability to catalyze the alkylation reaction. However, pure chloroaluminate IL exhibits low selectivity towards synthesizing high-octane isomers.

A composite ionic liquid (CIL) alkylation technology called ionikylation has been developed by the China University of Petroleum that utilizes a chloroaluminate IL base and a proprietary mixture of additional IL additives to overcome high-octane isomer selectivity issues. The ionikylation technology is reported to produce alkylate with octane rating generally ranging from 94-96, and as high as 98. The CIL catalyst used in ionikylation is non-hazardous and non-corrosive, which allows entire operating system to be constructed using carbon steel. Three CIL alkylation units, each with 300,000 ton-per-year capacity, came online in China in 2019 at Sinopec’s refineries in Jiujiang City, Anqing City, and Wuhan City. As of 2022, there were three such units operated by PetroChina and seven in total, including a converted HF alkylation unit at Sinopec's Wuhan plant.

== Feeds ==
The olefin feed to an alkylation unit generally originates from a FCCU and contains butene, isobutene, and possibly propene and/or amylenes. The olefin feed is also likely to contain diluents (such as propane, n-butane, and n-pentane), noncondensables (such as ethane and hydrogen) and contaminants. Diluents in principle have no effect on the reaction of alkylation but occupy a portion of the reactor and can influence the yield of secondary reactions of polymerisation and of undesired organofluorine side products. Incondensable are from a chemical perspective similar to diluents but they do not condense at the pressure and temperature of the process, and therefore they concentrate to a point that must be vented. Contaminants are compounds that react with and/or dilute the sulfuric acid catalyst. They increase acid consumption and contribute to produce undesirable reaction products and increase polymer formation. Common contaminants are water, methanol and ethanol.

The isobutane feed to an alkylation unit can be either low or high purity. Low purity makeup isobutane feedstock (typically < 70% vol isobutane) usually originates from the refinery (mainly from the reformer) and need to be processed in the deisobutanizer (DIB). High purity feedstock (> 95% vol isobutane) normally originates from an external De-isobutanizer (DIB) tower and is fed directly to the alkylation unit reaction zone. Such isobutane feed does not normally contain any significant level of contaminants.

== Mechanism ==
The catalyst protonates the alkenes (propene, butene) to produce reactive carbocations, which alkylate isobutane. The reaction is carried out at mild temperatures (0-30 °C) in a two-phase reaction. Because the reaction is exothermic, cooling is needed: SAAU plants require lower temperatures so the cooling medium needs to be chilled, for HFAU normal refinery cooling water will suffice. It is important to keep a high ratio of isobutane to alkene at the point of reaction to prevent side reactions which produces a lower octane product, so the plants have a high recycle of Isobutane back to feed. The phases separate spontaneously, so the acid phase is vigorously mixed with the hydrocarbon phase to create sufficient contact surface. Unfortunately, a number of secondary reactions take place and they reduce the quality of the alkylate effluent.

Polymerization results from the addition of a second olefin to the C8 carbocation formed in the primary reaction. The resulting C12 carbocation can continue to react with an olefin to form a larger carbocation. As with the previously described mechanisms, the heavy carbocations may at some point undergo a hydride transfer from isobutane to yield a C12 – C16 isoparaffin and a t-butyl cation. These heavy molecules tend to lower the octane and raise the boiling end point of the alkylate effluent.

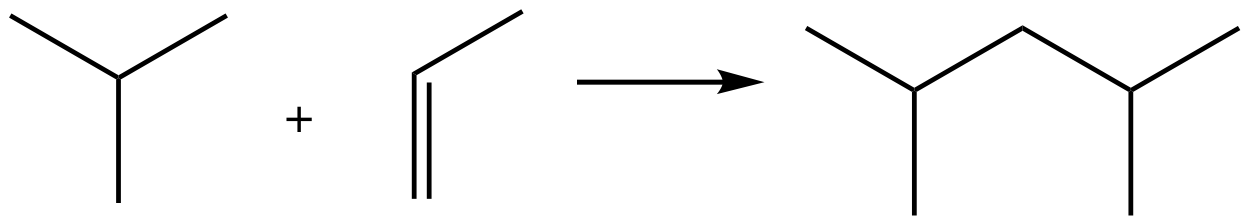
Typical acid-catalyzed route to 2,4-dimethylpentane.

== Process description ==
=== HFAU process description ===
The HFAU can be divided into three main sections: reaction, fractionation, and defluorinating / alumina treating.

The purpose of the unit is to react an olefin feed with isobutane in the reaction section in the presence of the HF acting as catalyst to produce alkylate. Prior to entering the reaction section, the olefin and isobutane feed are treated in a coalescer to remove water, sulfur and other contaminants.

Temperature is held at 60 to 100 °F (16 to 38 °C), which is convenient as it does not require refrigeration, and sufficient pressure is maintained so that the components are in the liquid state.

In the fractionation section, alkylate is separated from excess isobutane and acid catalyst through distillation. Unreacted isobutane is recovered and recycled back to the reaction section to mix with the olefin feed. Propane is a major product of the distillation process. Some amount of n-butane that has entered with the feed is also withdrawn as a side product.

Propane and butane that have not been separated from the treated olefin pass through the unit. Although they do not participate directly in the reactions, and adversely impact product quality, they provide an avenue for organic fluorides to leave the unit. The propane stream is removed (typically in a tower called the HF stripper) and are then processed in the defluorinating section to remove combined fluorides and any trace acid that may be present due to mis-operation. Many units also remove butane, which typically gets treated in a separate defluorinating section.

=== SAAU process description ===
A SAAU can be divided into five major sections: reaction, refrigeration, effluent treating, fractionation and blowdown.

In the reaction section the reacting hydrocarbons (olefin feed with both fresh and recycled isobutane) are brought into contact with sulfuric acid catalyst under controlled conditions and at a temperature of 15.6 °C (60 °F). The feeds are treated to remove impurities, especially water in order to reduce corrosion.

The heat of reaction is removed in the refrigeration section and the light hydrocarbons are purged from the unit. In the effluent treating section the free acid, alkyl sulfates and di-alkyl sulfates are removed from the net effluent stream to avoid downstream corrosion and fouling using a settler.

The sulfuric acid present in the reaction zone serves as a catalyst to the alkylation reaction. Theoretically, a catalyst promotes a chemical reaction without being changed as a result of that reaction. In reality, however, the acid is diluted as a result of the side reactions and feed contaminants. To maintain the desired spent acid strength, a small amount of fresh acid is continuously charged to the acid recycle line from the acid settler to the reactor and an equivalent amount of spent acid is withdrawn from the acid settler. In the fractionation section the unreacted isobutane is recovered for recycle to the reaction section and remaining hydrocarbons are separated into the desired products.

The spent acid is degassed in an acid blowdown drum, waste water pH is adjusted and acid vent streams are neutralized with caustic in a scrubber before being flared. Spent acid goes to storage and is periodically removed.

=== Operating variables ===
Many variables impact the product quality and operating costs of an alkylation unit.

- Isobutane Concentration

In order to promote the desired alkylation reactions, which are those involving isobutane and olefins, it is necessary to maintain a high concentration of isobutane in the reaction zone. Low isobutane-olefin ratios increase the likelihood of olefin-olefin polymerization that will result in lower octane. Polymerization reactions also have a higher rate of production of acid soluble oils, resulting in higher acid consumption.

- Temperature

Typically, alkylation is carried out in the neighborhood of 20 °C. Higher reaction temperatures dramatically favor polymerization reactions that will dilute the acid. Equipment corrosion will also increase with higher reaction temperatures. Low reaction temperatures slow the settling rate of the acid from the alkylate. Lower temperature than ambient cannot be achieved without refrigeration as the coldest possible temperature is that of the cooling fluids (air and water). Seasonal factors influence the production of polymerization reactions, therefore in summer the consumption of acid is higher, especially in HFAU.

- Acid strength

As the concentration of the acid catalyst is reduced, the rate of production of acid soluble polymers increases. Feeds that contain high amounts of propylene have a much higher rate of acid consumption over the normal range. High acid concentration must be maintained in order to minimize polymerization and red oil production. When concentration is too low catalyst activity is substantially decreased and polymerization enhanced to the point that it is difficult to maintain acid strength. This condition is known as acid runaway. In SAAU recent studies have found that both butylenes and amylenes can be spent to a lower acid concentration without entering into a runaway condition. While the economics of alkylating both butylenes and amylenes will benefit from lowering the acid spending strength, the acid consumption of amylenes has a greater response than that of butylenes. Also the expected decrease in octane of alkylates produced at lower acid concentrations is less for amylenes than butylenes.

- Olefin space velocity

Olefin space velocity is defined as the volume of olefin charged per hour divided by the average volume of sulfuric acid in the contactor reactor. In general, higher olefin space velocities tend to increase sulfuric acid consumption rates and decrease alkylate octane.

- Mixing

Mixing is an important parameter, especially in SAAU because the alkylation reaction depends on the emulsion of the hydrocarbon into the sulfuric acid. This is an acid continuous emulsion and it is presumed that the reaction occurs at the interface of acid and hydrocarbon. The better the emulsion, the finer the droplets and the better the reaction.

== Economics ==
Refineries examine whether it makes sense economically to install alkylation units. Alkylation units are complex, with substantial economy of scale. SAAU and HFAU have comparable capital investment costs. It is not surprising that the two processes are competitive on a capital cost basis, when one considers the basic process differences. The SAAU has a more expensive reactor section and requires refrigeration. However, equal costs are realized in the HF unit by the need for feed driers, product treating, regeneration equipment and more exotic metallurgy. In addition, most refiners will require a dedicated cooling system for an HF unit, to remove the risk of site-wide corrosion in the case of an HF leak. These capital cost estimates do not account for the additional safety and mitigation equipment now required in HF units. Due to the possible hazardous aerosol formation when the HF catalyst is released as a superheated liquid, expensive mitigation systems are now required in many locations throughout the world where HF is used as an alkylation catalyst.

In addition to a suitable quantity of feedstock, the price spread between the value of alkylate product and alternate feedstock disposition value must be large enough to justify the installation. Alternative outlets for refinery alkylation feedstocks include sales as LPG, blending of C_{4} streams directly into gasoline and feedstocks for chemical plants. Local market conditions vary widely between plants. Variation in the RVP specification for gasoline between countries and between seasons dramatically impacts the amount of butane streams that can be blended directly into gasoline. The transportation of specific types of LPG streams can be expensive so local disparities in economic conditions are often not fully mitigated by cross market movements of alkylation feedstocks.

A common source of the C_{3} and C_{4} alkenes for the alkylation is the gas recovery unit processing the effluents of the Fluid catalytic cracking Unit. Isobutane is partly made available from the catalytic reforming and from the atmospheric distillation, although the proportion of the isobutane produced in a refinery is rarely sufficient to run the unit at full capacity and additional isobutane needs therefore to be brought to the refinery. The economics of the international and local market of gasolines dictates the spread that a buyer need to pay for isobutane compared to standard commercial butane.

For all these reasons the margin of the process is very volatile but in spite of its volatility during the early 21st century it has been on a growing trend. In 2015 alkylation gross margin (calculated according to the prices of alkylation feedstocks and effluents) on the US Gulf Coast market reached US$80/barrel of alkylate produced while in the decade preceding 2021, it averaged about $40/bbl. As of 2018, alkylation was considered one of the highest value added operations on a refinery.

Gross margin however excludes variable and fixed operating costs and depreciation. Notably, variable costs greatly depend on the technology used, the factor making the difference being the acid consumption. Between 50 and 80 kg of H_{2}SO_{4} is frequently required to produce 1 ton of alkylate. At preferred condition, the consumption of acid can be much lower, such as 10–30 kg of acid per ton of alkylate, assuming feedstocks without diene impurities leading to undesired side reactions. In a SAAU acid costs frequently account for about one third of the total operating costs of alkylation, hence there is considerable incentive to reduce H_{2}SO_{4} consumption. HF required quantity is in the range of 10–35 kg per ton of alkylate but most of the acid is recovered and recycled, so only a make-up is necessary to replace the consumed HF. In practice acid consumption in a SAAU is more than 100 times bigger than in a HFAU.

Utility costs tend to favor the SAAU. Many HFAU units require isobutane-to-olefin ratios on the order of 13 - 15/1 to produce an acceptable octane product. Other HFAU and most of SAAU develop conditions of mixing and recycle optimization such that they produce similar octane products with isobutane to olefin ratios on the order of 7 - 9/1. Clearly the latter, better-designed units operate with significantly lower fractionation costs.

Currently, many HF units are operating below the design isobutane-to-olefin ratio, but to obtain the required octane, due to increasingly tight gasoline specifications, these ratios will need to be increased back to design ratios. The SAAU process employs either electric or turbine drives for the reactors and compressor to optimize refinery utilities. Horsepower input to the HF reaction zone is lower than to the H_{2}SO_{4} reaction zone. In addition, the HF process does not require refrigeration. Therefore, power costs are less for HF units. Normally, the difference in fractionation costs outweighs this advantage when comparing overall utility costs. However, HF units may show a utility advantage if fuel cost is low relative to power cost.

=== Market specifications of the alkylate ===
Alkylate is a blending component so as opposed to a finished gasoline ready for consumption it has no specifications to be marketable. Nevertheless, independent provider of energy and petrochemicals information like Platts reports trades for alkylate ready for blending in the gasoline pool, with RVP < 5.5 psi, (RON + MON)/2 > 92 and of course free of aromatics, olefins and sulfur.

== Maintenance ==
Maintenance costs and data are difficult to obtain on a comparable basis. HFAU have much more peripheral equipment (feed driers, product treaters, acid regeneration column and an acid-soluble oil neutralizer), thus more pieces of equipment to operate and maintain. SAAU have larger pieces of equipment, such as the compressor and reactor, but maintenance costs are generally lower. Unit downtime to prepare for a full unit turnaround can take longer for HF units, since the reactor-settler system and all the fractionators must be neutralized before maintenance work can proceed. In H_{2}SO_{4} units, only the reactor-settler system requires neutralization. In addition, extensive safety equipment (breathing apparatus, etc.) is required whenever maintenance is performed with a potential of HF release. Once work is completed, the maintenance worker must go through a neutralization chamber to cleanse the safety equipment. A face shield and gloves are the only typical requirements when performing maintenance on an SAAU.

== Safety ==
Alkylation units have two primary process hazards: 1) The unit process large volumes of light hydrocarbons which are highly flammable and potentially explosive. 2) The acid catalyst is corrosive and toxic. Both SAAU and HFAU contain similar volumes of hydrocarbon with similar risks, but the risks associated with each acid are quite different. HF requires much stricter precautions because of its greater potential for harm (this is due to its lower boiling point and higher harmful potential). In light of this high risk, the American Petroleum Institute has issued a Recommended Practice specifically for HF alkylation units (API RP 751). This publication recommends in Section 2.6 that access to an HF alkylation unit be strictly limited due to the potential hazards of HF. No similar, specific safety document is required for sulfuric acid alkylation.

Because of its low boiling point, spent HF is regenerated by fractionation within the HF alkylation unit. However, fresh HF must still be brought into the refinery to replace the HF consumed. The unloading and handling of fresh HF must be undertaken with great care since this operation carries the same risk to the refinery workers and surrounding community from an HF release as previously discussed. Perhaps the greatest transportation risk related to HF is the potential release during an accident while transporting fresh acid from the manufacturer to the refinery. Since no mitigation equipment would be available at an accident site, the consequences could be catastrophic.

Spent sulfuric acid is regenerated by thermal decomposition outside the battery limits of the sulfuric acid alkylation unit. This may be accomplished on the refinery site in sulfuric acid regeneration equipment operated by the refinery or in a commercial sulfuric acid regeneration plant which serves several refiners. The choice between these two options is site specific and usually depends on capital versus operating cost considerations and the proximity of the refinery to an existing commercial regeneration plant. As there is low risk from the sulfuric acid itself, the choice to regenerate on-site the acid or elsewhere is based on consideration of economic nature. Of course, even this relatively minor risk is eliminated with on-site sulfuric acid regeneration equipment.

=== Corrosion issues ===
Despite significant advances in process technology, there continue to be recurring corrosion problems that affect the safety and reliability of HFAU. Any section of the unit in contact with HF needs to be built with suitable materials in mind. Carbon steel is by far the most common material used, although it requires tight controls on composition and hardness. Alternative, more corrosion resistant materials such as such as Monel are sometimes used, but these materials are significantly more expensive and carry their own unique risks, such as stress corrosion cracking. Proper inspection is critical on HFAUs and typically occurs on a much more frequent basis than most other units in a refinery.

The tanks containing the alkylate produced through a HFAU needs to be monitored continuously. Indeed, alkylate produced in such units contains small impurities of HF corrosion products. If the alkylate enters in contact with water (for example in the bottom of the tank), HF can re-form in the water and cause corrosion of the steel. For this reason, many refiners utilize a weak caustic "heel" of water in the bottom of their alkylate tanks, in order to neutralize any acid that may form. pH monitoring of the tank water is however necessary to assess if any HF is formed downstream.

Conversely in SAAU corrosion is a less dominant issue and can be mastered by minimizing the amount of water entering in the process.
