= Waziri Adio =

Nigerian journalist (born 1968)

- Born: Waziri Onibiyo Adio; June 13, 1968 (age 58); Iwo, Osun, Nigeria
- Education: University of Lagos (BSc) Columbia University (MSc) Harvard University (MPA)
- Occupations: Journalist, Public Policy Expert
- Years active: 1993–present
- Known for: Executive Secretary of NEITI, Founder of Agora Policy

Waziri Onibiyo Adio (born June 13, 1968) is a Nigerian journalist, media strategist, and former public official. He is the founder and executive director of Agora Policy, a Nigerian public policy institute. He was widely recognised for his leadership as the Executive Secretary of the Nigeria Extractive Industries Transparency Initiative (NEITI) from 2016 to 2021 and he wrote a memoir, The Arc of the Possible.

== Early life and education ==
Adio is from Iwo in Osun State, Nigeria. He earned a Bachelor of Science in Mass Communication from the University of Lagos in 1992. He went on to obtain a Master of Science in Journalism from Columbia University Graduate School of Journalism in New York in 1999, and a Master in Public Administration (MPA) from the Harvard Kennedy School of Government in 2009. At Harvard, he was both a Nieman Fellow in Journalism (2001–2002) and a Mason Fellow (2008–2009). Adio is also a fellow of the Africa Leadership Initiative – West Africa (ALIWA) under the Aspen Global Leadership Network

== Career ==
=== Journalism and media ===
Adio started his journalism career at TEMPO Magazine in the early 1990s before moving to ThisDay Newspapers, where he served in various senior roles including Political Editor, New York Bureau Chief, Editorial Page Editor, Contributing Editor, and Editor-at-Large. He wrote an influential column, Postscript, on the back page of ThisDay on Sunday and continues to contribute opinion pieces and commentary. He was the publisher and editor-in-chief of Metropole Magazine (2012–2016), a publication dedicated to life and governance in Abuja.

=== Public policy and government roles ===
Between 2003 and 2004, Adio served as Special Adviser on Research and Strategy to the President of the Nigerian Senate. He later worked as Communications Specialist at the United Nations Development Programme (UNDP) Country Office in Nigeria (2004–2007), where he led advocacy around the Millennium Development Goals and supervised regional communication officers. In 2007, he joined NEITI as Director of Communications, where he played a key role in the passage of the NEITI Act and built its public communications strategy. From February 2016 to February 2021, Adio served as the Executive Secretary and Board Member of NEITI His tenure was credited with reinvigorating NEITI's domestic and international influence in the extractive transparency and governance space.

== Book ==
He is the author of The Arc of the Possible – A memoir detailing his five-year tenure at NEITI and reflections on public service, policy reform, and governance in Nigeria.

== Personal life ==
Adio is married to Sandra Adio, and they have three children.
