= Bashir Ojulari =

Nigeria engineer and expert in petroleum, process and production engineering

Bashir Bayo Ojulari
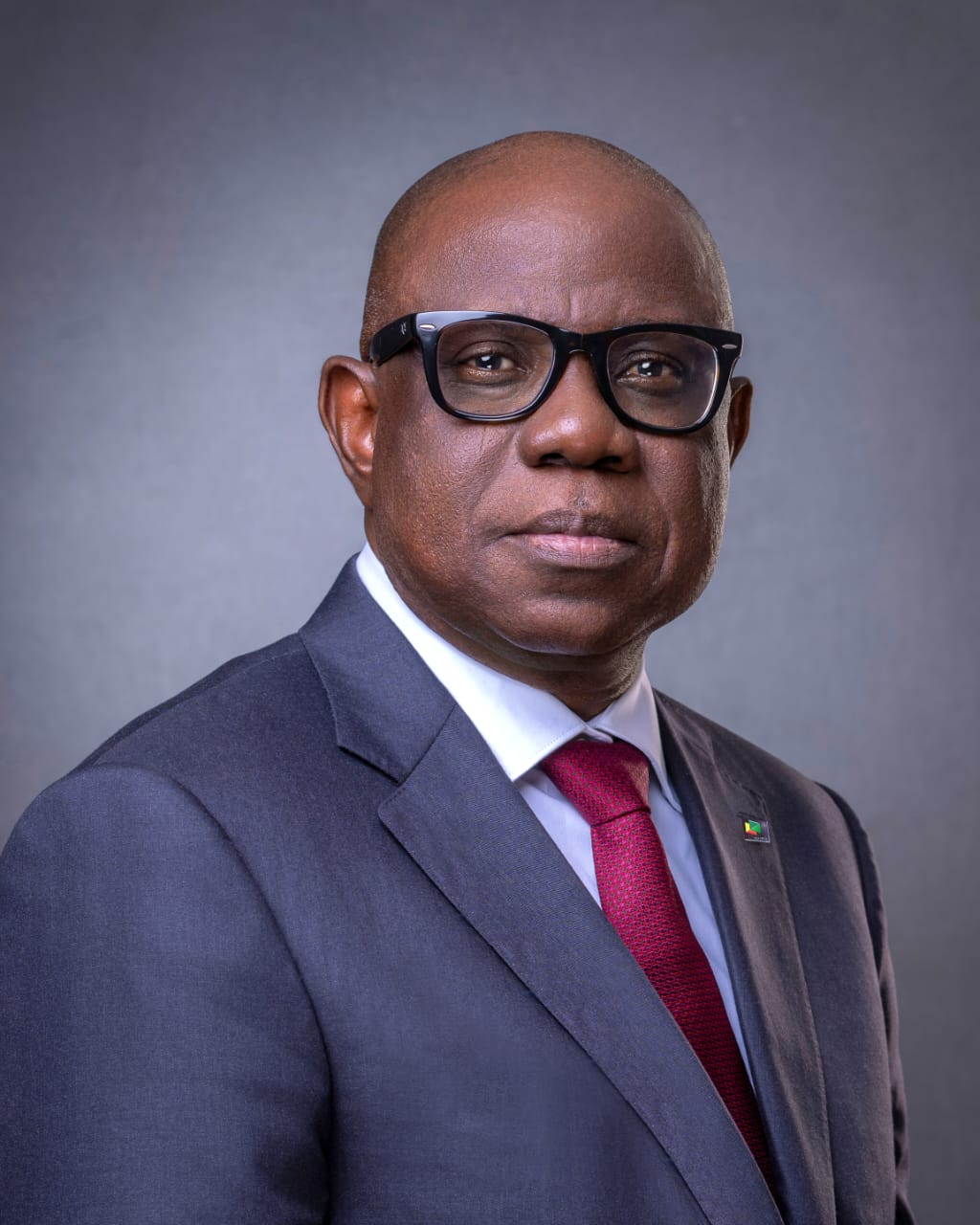

Group Chief Executive Officer of the NNPC Limited
- Incumbent
- Assumed office 2 April 2025
- President: Bola Tinubu
- Preceded by: Mele Kyari

Executive Vice-President and Chief Operating Officer, Renaissance African Energy Company
- In office January 2024 – March 2025

Managing Director, Shell Nigeria Exploration and Production Company
- In office 2015–2021

Personal details
- Born: June 3, 1965 (age 61) Ilorin
- Occupation: Engineer

Bashir Bayo Ojulari is a Nigerian engineer and expert in petroleum, process and production engineering currently serving as Group Chief Executive Officer of the Nigerian National Petroleum Company Limited (NNPC Ltd). In January 2024, Ojulari joined Renaissance African Energy Company as executive vice-president and chief operating officer and led a consortium of local energy companies in a $2.4 billion Shell Petroleum Development Company of Nigeria (SPDC) acquisition deal. He was managing director of Shell Nigeria Exploration and Production Company from 2015 to 2021. President Bola Tinubu appointed him as the Group Chief Executive Officer of the NNPC Ltd on 2 April 2025.

== Education ==
Ojulari graduated with a degree in Mechanical Engineering from Ahmadu Bello University, Zaria in 1989.

== Career ==
Ojulari is a Fellow of Nigerian Society of Engineers. His career in energy is focused on exploration, field development, production management, strategic planning and investment evaluation. He began his career in 1989 as a field and process engineer at Elf Petroleum Nigeria before moving to Shell in 1991 as an associate production technologist. At Shell, Ojulari worked in Europe and the Middle East in different managerial capacities in Petroleum Engineering, Process Engineering, Production Engineering and in health and safety roles. From June 1994 to October 1995, Ojulari served on the Shell integrated studies team at its headquarters in the Netherland. In late 1990, Ojulari served in different leadership positions in Nigeria engineering professional organisations including as chairman and member of board of trustees of Society of Petroleum Engineers (SPE Nigeria Council) from 1998 to 1999.

In 1997, he became the head of planning, economics and budgeting of Shell Petroleum Development Company (SPDC) and served in this position until 1999 when he was transferred to Oman SPDC where he was head, production technologists and asset leader. In 2003, Ojulari returned to Shell headquarters as a regional planner for sub-Saharan Africa and later served in different capacities at SPDC including as manager corporate planning and strategy, and asset development (onshore and shallow water).

In 2010, Ojulari was appointed as a director at SPDC leading petroleum engineering of 100 oil and gas fields and 15 major projects with well budget of $700 million.

Ojulari was appointed Managing Director Shell Nigeria Exploration and Production Company and as general manager, Deepwater in November 2015. Within this period, he served as a member of the board of directors of Shell Petroleum Development Company (SPDC) responsible for Onshore and Offshore Petroleum Engineering, Technical Integration of Development, Well and Project Engineering. During his term he developed Nigeria’s first deepwater project - Bonga field and increased production to 320,000 barrels per day with cost-saving plan that reduced operational expenses by 30 per cent. He retired from his positions in Shell in July 2021.

In 2021, he founded BAT Advisory & Energy, a company specialising in upstream and midstream advisory serving as the chairman of its board. In January 2024, Ojulari joined Renaissance African Energy Company as executive vice-president and chief operating officer. In this position, he led a consortium of indigenous energy firms – ND Western, Aradel Energy, First Exploration & Production, Waltersmith, and Petrolin in a $2.4 billion Shell Petroleum Development Company of Nigeria acquisition deal.

=== GCEO NNPC Limited ===
On 2 April 2025, Nigerian President Bola Tinubu appointed Ojulari as group chief executive officer (GCEO) of Nigeria state oil company, NNPC Limited. Ojulari initiated several reforms in the NNPC Limited operations including terminating crude oil swaps to fund inactive national oil refineries repairs to block revenue leakages and halted the direct involvement of the NNPC Limited in the Turnaround Maintenance (TAM) of same refineries which had costed the country over ₦13 trillion in two decades. He proposed a new model - Technical Equity Partnership which would give international operators majority controlling stake in the refineries reducing NNPC Limited’s equity stake down to between 10% and 40% for efficient running of the refineries.

In 2025, NNPC Limited recorded a “historic” profit after tax of ₦7.2 trillion for the 2025 financial year up 33% in profits year-on-year earnings driven by Ojulari’s 25% cut in administrative running cost of NNPC Limited operations and debt recovery from outstanding balance on crude oil transactions owed to company by its long-standing customers. Same period, joint-venture contract renegotiations freed up $3.4 billion in structural savings for the state oil company and Nigeria exceeded its Opec quota as crude oil output averaged 1.7 million barrels per day from average 1.55 mbpd prior to Ojulari’s administration.
