= Dangote refinery =

Oil refinery in Lagos, Nigeria

Coordinates: 06°27′10″N 04°00′04″E

Dangote Refinery
- Interactive map of Dangote Refinery
- Location: Lekki, Lagos, Nigeria

Refinery details
- Owner: Dangote Group
- Opened: 22 May 2023
- Capacity: 700,000 barrels per day (110,000 m^{3}/d)
- Complexity index: 10.5
- No. of employees: 3,000+
- Website: refinery.dangote.com

Dangote Refinery is owned by the Dangote Group and located in Lekki, Nigeria. The refinery was officially commissioned on May 22, 2023 and began operations in January 2024, processing crude into products like diesel and aviation fuel. The production of Premium Motor Spirit (PMS), began in September 2024. Originally intended to have a refining capacity of about 650,000 barrels of crude oil per day at full operation, the refinery is the largest single-train refinery in the world with initial investments in excess of $19 billion.

As at February 2026, the refinery had hit full refining capacity. The refinery has also significantly increased exports of refined petroleum products, shipping large volumes across Africa — including to Ghana, Cameroon, Togo and Tanzania — and to a number of international markets across the globe. Also, in March 2026, several African governments, including South Africa, were reported to be in discussions with the Dangote Refinery for long‑term supply arrangements, with South Africa inquiring about a 12‑month contract for refined petroleum products amid global fuel market disruptions; governments such as Ghana and Kenya have also expressed interest in diversified supply sources.

In October 2025, Aliko Dangote, the refinery's founder and majority owner announced ongoing expansion efforts which would increase the refining capacity to 1.4 million barrels per day. This would make it the largest refinery in the world based on current global refinery capacities. The expansion, estimated at $14.3 billion, is expected to be completed by 2029.

== History ==
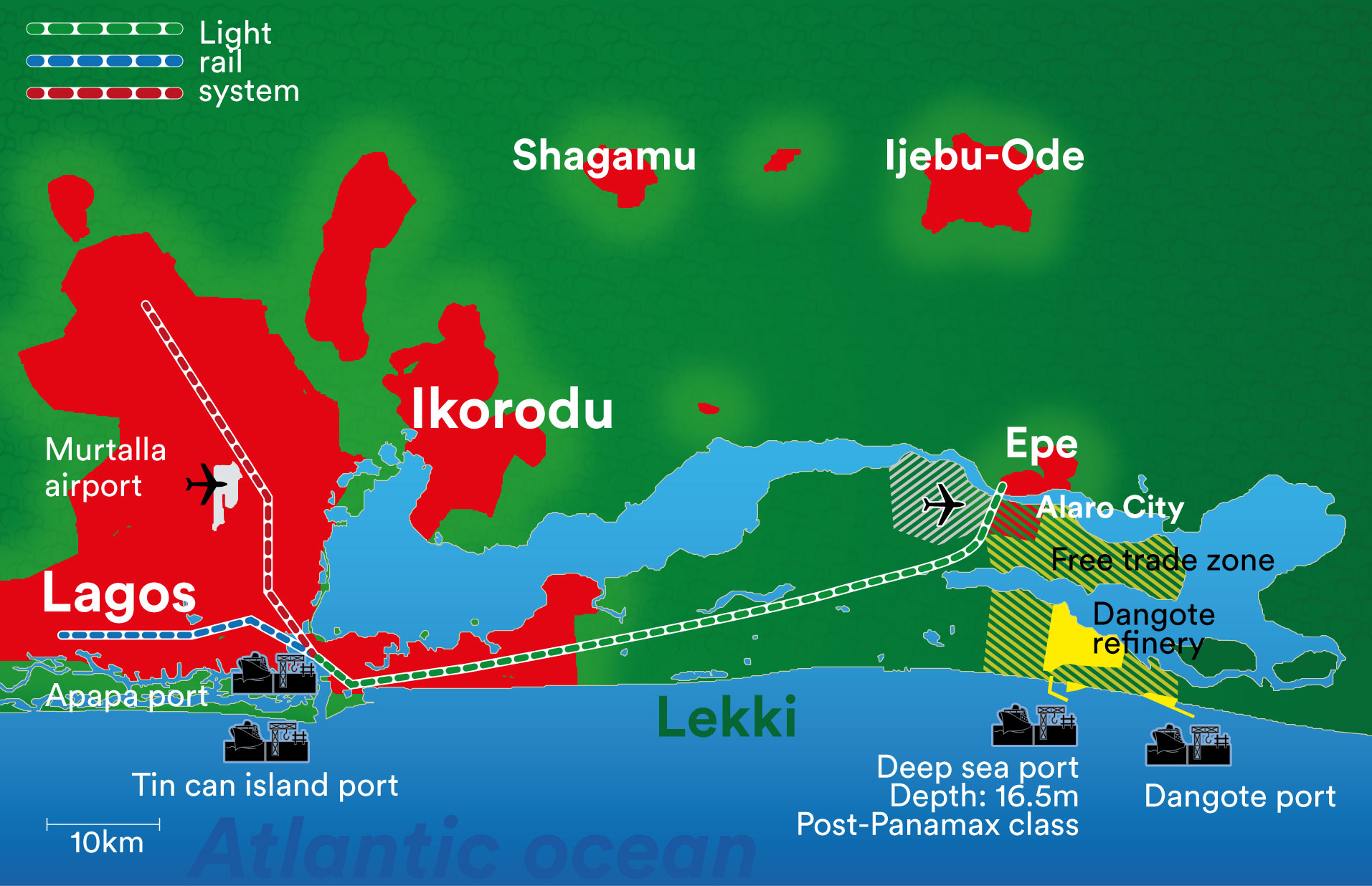
Dangote refinery and Free Trade Zone Lekki, east of Lagos

Nigerian businessman Aliko Dangote unveiled early plans for the refinery in September 2013, when he announced that he had secured about $3.3 billion in financing for the project. At the time, the refinery was estimated to cost about $9 billion, of which $3 billion would be invested by the Dangote Group and the remainder via commercial loans, and begin production in 2016. However, after a change in location to Lekki, construction of the refinery did not begin until 2016 with excavation and infrastructure preparation, and the planned completion was pushed back to late 2018.

The main contractor for the project was China's state-owned China National Chemical Engineering Company (CNCEC), which was responsible for large-scale engineering, procurement, and construction works at the site under a US$520 million contract. Engineers India Limited, a state-owned Indian firm, was appointed in March 2014 under a US$139 million contract for the provision of project management services for the refinery and polypropylene plant.

About 150,000 tonnes of prefabricated structural steel were supplied from Hangxiao Steel Structure and shipped to Nigeria from China in knocked-down condition for assembly on site. Large equipment, including flue gas steam generators, heat recovery steam generators, boilers, furnaces, and airfin coolers, was modularized in India and transported complete with structures, piping, electrical, and instrumentation for installation using some of the largest capacity cranes in the world.

In July 2017, major structural construction began. An associated project at the site of the refinery, a urea fertilizer factory, was scheduled to begin operation in late 2018 and produce about three million tons of urea annually. In 2018 the project was expected to cost up to $15 billion in total, with $10 billion invested in the refinery, $2.5 billion in the fertilizer factory, and $2.5 billion in pipeline infrastructure.

In July 2022, Dangote - Nigeria's richest resident - had to borrow 187 billion naira (about 442 million USD) at 12.75% resp. 13.5% p.a. to complete the refinery. At the same time, all of the four refineries of the state-owned oil company NNPC in Kaduna, Port Harcourt and Warri are idle and expect to process crude oil again in 2023 after revamping.

In September 2023, the refinery announced that it will start producing Diesel and kerosene in October 2023 and gasoline one month later.

In September, it became clear that the refinery would not yet be able to start operations because the supply of crude oil was stalling. This caused considerable public reaction. On 25 November, the Financial Times gave a new date for the start of operations in December 2023, with the refinery expecting a delivery of 6 million barrels of crude oil in December, after which operations could begin. This would be the first delivery of a total of six.

On 7 December, the refinery received its first delivery of 1 million barrels of Agbami crude oil. The delivery of the Supersuez tanker OTIS did not take place in the refinery's harbour, but via Single Point Mooring, a buoy-like floating facility for unloading liquid cargo off the coast.

The production of diesel fuel and aviation fuel A1 started in January 2024.

The Dangote Refinery is capable of supplying 100% of Nigeria's oil needs, with a surplus for export.

On 26 June 2024, a minor fire occurred in the refinery with video from the scene showing smoke and flame billowing from one corner of the plant. The operator said in a statement that the blaze had no impact.

At the end of May 2024, Aliko Dangote announced that within 2 months the refinery would attain the capacity of 500,000 barrels a day. The refinery would continue to import oil from the United States, since the domestic oil production can't deliver. "We can't wait" Mr. Dangote said. At the same time the spokesman of the refinery announced that the Dangote Refinery aims to be listed both at the London Stock Exchange (LSE) and the Nigerian Stock Exchange (NSE) in Lagos.

In July 2024, Aliko Dangote made an offer to sell the Dangote Refinery to the Nigerian National Petroleum Corporation Limited after allegations of being a monopolist.

In October 2024, the Nigerian National Petroleum Company Limited (NNPC) ended its exclusive purchase agreement with Dangote Refinery, allowing other marketers to buy petrol directly from the refinery. The NNPC had been buying petrol from Dangote Refinery at ₦898.78 per litre and selling to marketers at ₦765.99 per litre, shouldering a subsidy of almost ₦133 per litre. Following the NNPC's withdrawal as the sole off-taker, subsidies ceased to exist in Nigeria as marketers had to buy directly from Dangote and sell at cost price, adding their own differential. This led to a hike in the product's price.

In November 2024, it was reported that Dangote was in talks with commercial lenders, development banks, oil traders, and other industry participants to secure funds for crude supplies.

In September 2025, the refinery dismissed 800 employees whom it accused of sabotage. This led to a protest strike by the Petroleum and Natural Gas Senior Staff Association of Nigeria.

The refinery reported an after-tax profit of $1.82 billion in the first half of 2026, compared with a loss of $476 million for all of 2025.

== Facility ==
The refinery is situated on a 6,180 acre site at the Lekki Free Trade Zone, Lekki, Lagos State. It is supplied with crude oil by the largest sub-sea pipeline infrastructure of the world (1,100 km long). When fully operational it will provide 135,000 permanent jobs in the region.

On October 26, 2025, Aliko Dangote announced plans to expand the refining capacity of the Dangote refinery to 1.4m bpd.

=== High complexity ===
The Dangote Oil Refinery has a Nelson complexity index of 10.5 which means that it will be more complex than most refineries in the United States (average 9.5) or Europe (average 6.5). (The largest refinery in the world, the Jamnagar Refinery in India, has a complexity of 21.1.) The Nelson complexity index basically increases with the number and capacity of chemical procedures after the distillation, e.g. hydrocracking, NHT, CCR, RFCC, polymerization etc.

Like other refineries, the Dangote refinery separates the molecules of crude oil in the distillation column by their length, breaks the longer molecules into shorter ones ("cracking") and combines short molecules into medium-sized ones ("alkylation"). It improves the knock resistance RON by remodelling initially linear molecules into ring structures ("CCR") or branch structures ("Penex"). It removes harmful sulphur in the Merox system, with the NHT and by SCANfining.

=== Superlatives ===
The Dangote refinery is the seventh-largest oil refinery in the world, see here.

In 2019, the world's largest crude distillation column, weighing 2,350 tonnes, was installed in place at the Dangote refinery by a specialist Dutch company. With a height of 112 metres it is slightly taller than the Saturn V rocket which brought the first man to the moon (110.6m) and 16 metres taller than Big Ben. In the same year, three more records were set when the world's heaviest refinery regenerator was installed - having already been the "heaviest item ever to be transported over a public road in Africa" at a stately 3,000 tonnes and also being "the heaviest single piece of steel structure" of the world.

=== Marine facilities ===
The self sufficient marine facility has the ability for freight optimization. To the marine facilities belong:

- 2 crude SPM (single point mooring, see image below) for unloading ships from Aframax to ULCC (ultra-large crude carrier)
- 3 product SPM for product exports up to Suezmax vessels
- 2 subsea crude pipelines (diameter 48" or 1.22 metres) with interconnection
- 4 subsea pipelines for products and imports (diameter 24" or 0.61 metres)
- ca. 120 km subsea pipeline

== Targeted performance ==
With a single crude oil distillation unit, the refinery will be the largest single-train refinery in the world.

At full production, the facility will process about 650,000 barrels of crude oil daily, transported via pipelines from oil fields in the Niger Delta, where natural gas will also be sourced to supply the fertilizer factory and be used in electrical generation for the refinery complex. This corresponds with 50,000,000 litres (13,000,000 US gal) of Euro-V quality gasoline and 17,000,000 litres (4,500,000 US gal) of diesel daily, as well as aviation fuel and plastic products. With a greater capacity than the total output of Nigeria's existing refining infrastructure, the Dangote Refinery will be able to meet the country's entire domestic fuel demand, as well as export refined products.

Bloomberg recently reported that Aliko Dangote plans to more than double the capacity of his oil refinery, creating a facility that will be among the largest in the world. His expressed intentions are to expand the refining capacity to 1.4m bpd. Currently, the Reliance Industries owned Jamnagar refinery in India is the largest single refinery in the world, with an aggregate refining capacity of 1.24m bpd.

== Initial public offering ==
In 2025, the president of the Dangote Group, Aliko Dangote, had announced plans to list the Dangote Petroleum Refinery through an initial public offering (IPO), with a target timeline of 2026.

The planned listing is intended to broaden the refinery’s investor base and may involve the sale of a minority stake in the business on the Nigerian Exchange (NGX) in 2026. Reports have indicated that up to around 10% of the refinery could be offered to investors as part of broader financing and expansion plans.

The IPO is also linked to the Dangote Group’s wider strategy to unlock value from its energy assets and support future expansion of the refinery.

The IPO went live on Monday, September 14, 2026.

Aliko Dangote had stated that the offering will include features aimed at attracting investors, including the option of foreign-currency-linked returns reflecting the refinery’s export-oriented revenue model. More recently, in a televised interview, he indicated that investors, even if subscribing in Naira, would have the option to receive dividends in either Naira or U.S. Dollars, as the refinery's revenues are in U.S. Dollars. In September 2026, the refinery advanced the offering on the Nigerian Securities and Exchange Commission, offering 4.1 billion ordinary shares at ₦525 (US$0.40) per share. The offering is expected to raise approximately ₦2.15 trillion (US$1.63 billion). The offering includes a greenshoe option allowing up to 30% additional shares to be sold if demand exceeds the initial offering. Proceeds are intended primarily to finance the refinery's planned expansion.

== Gallery ==
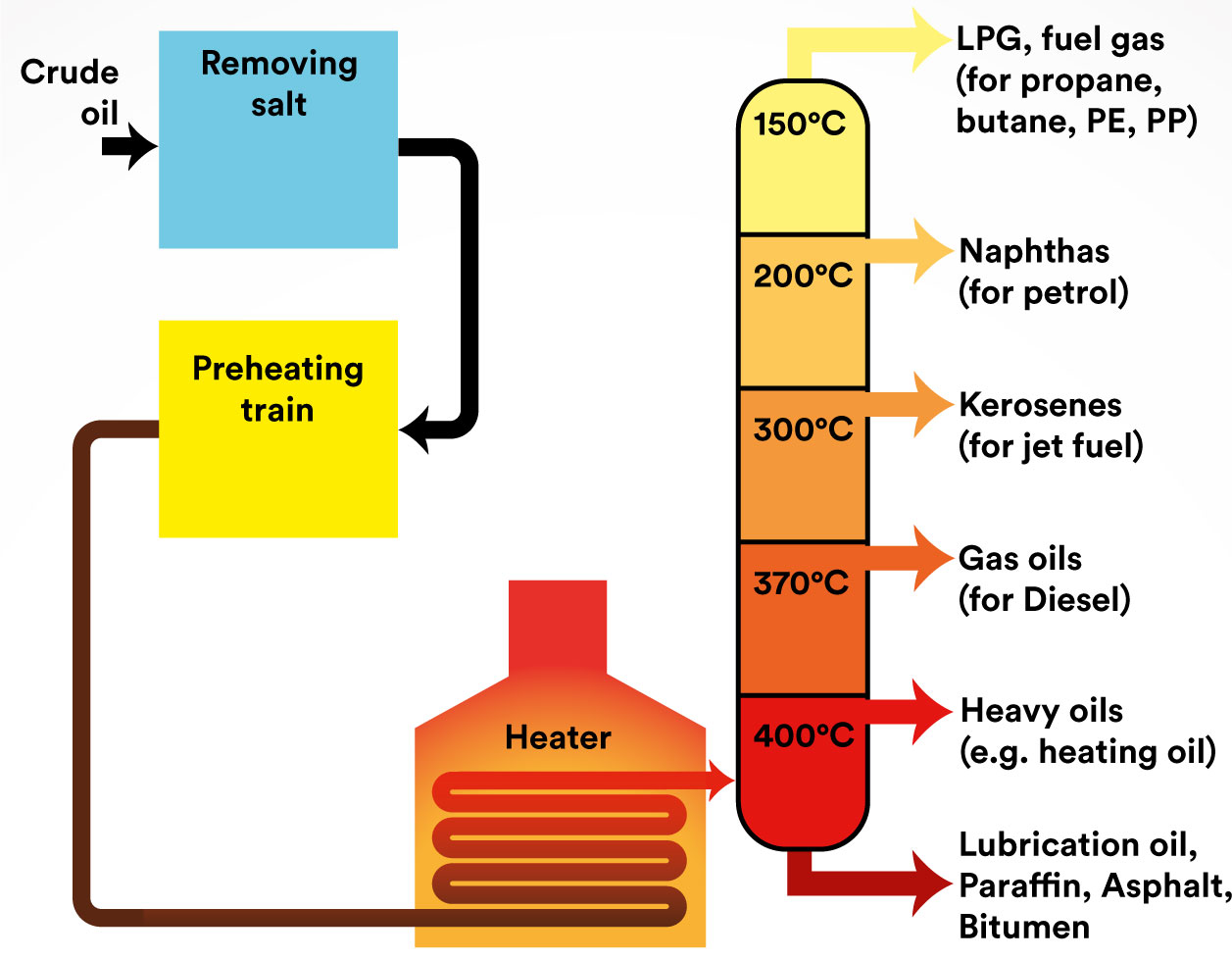
Crude oil distillation unit (working principle)

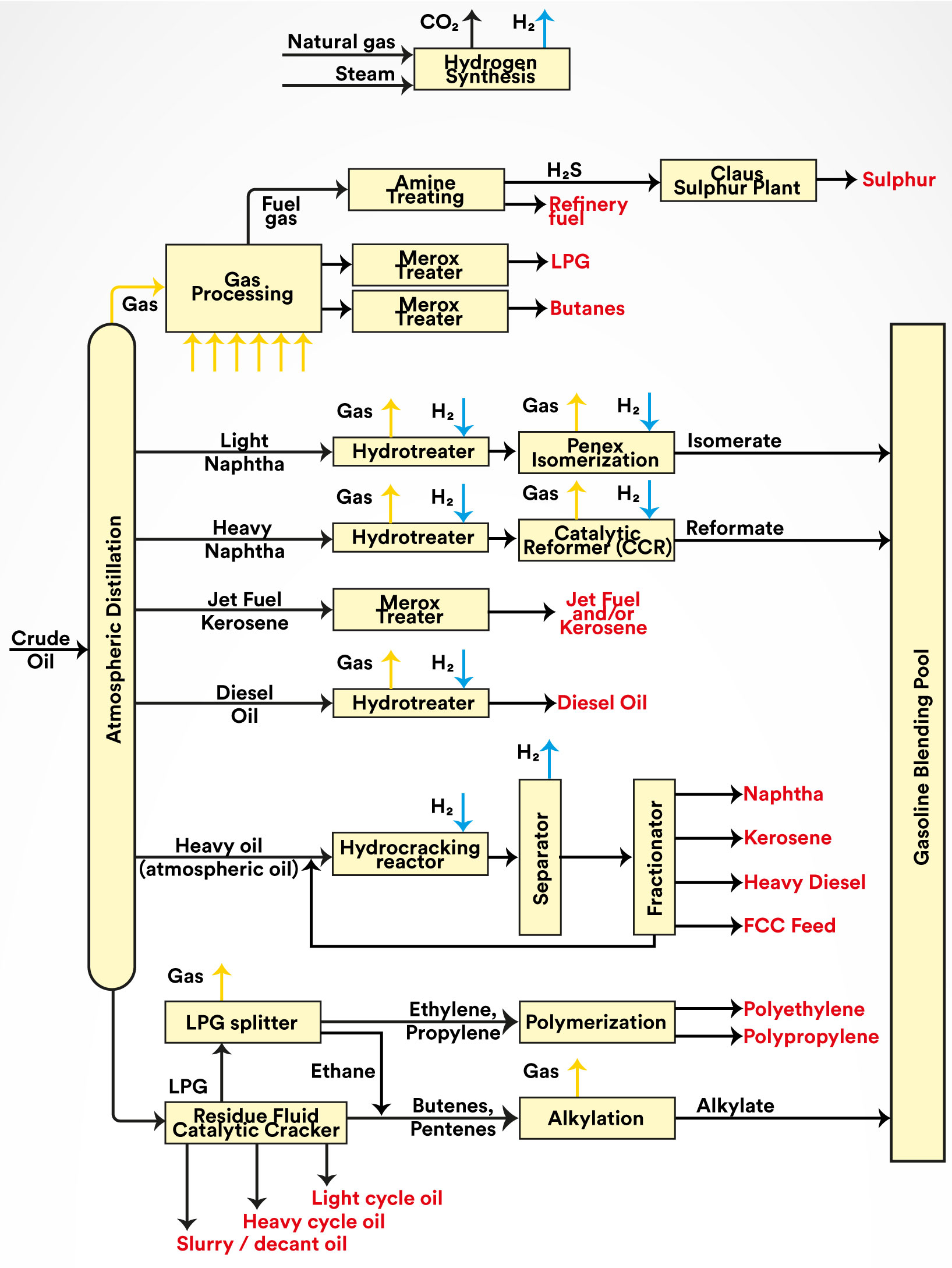
Simplified production flow chart of the Dangote refinery

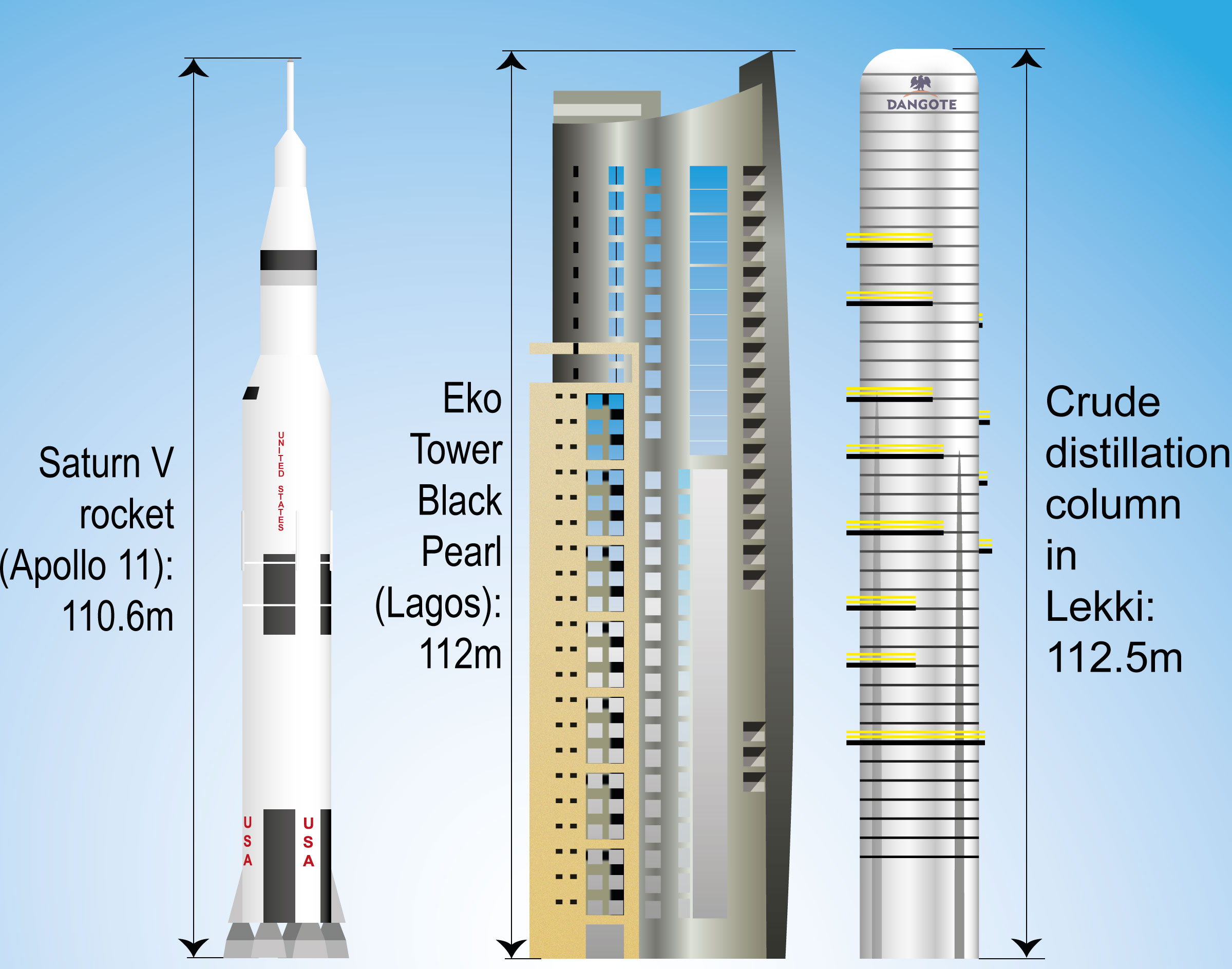
The CDU distilling/distillation column in comparison to the largest Eko Tower and a Saturn V rocket

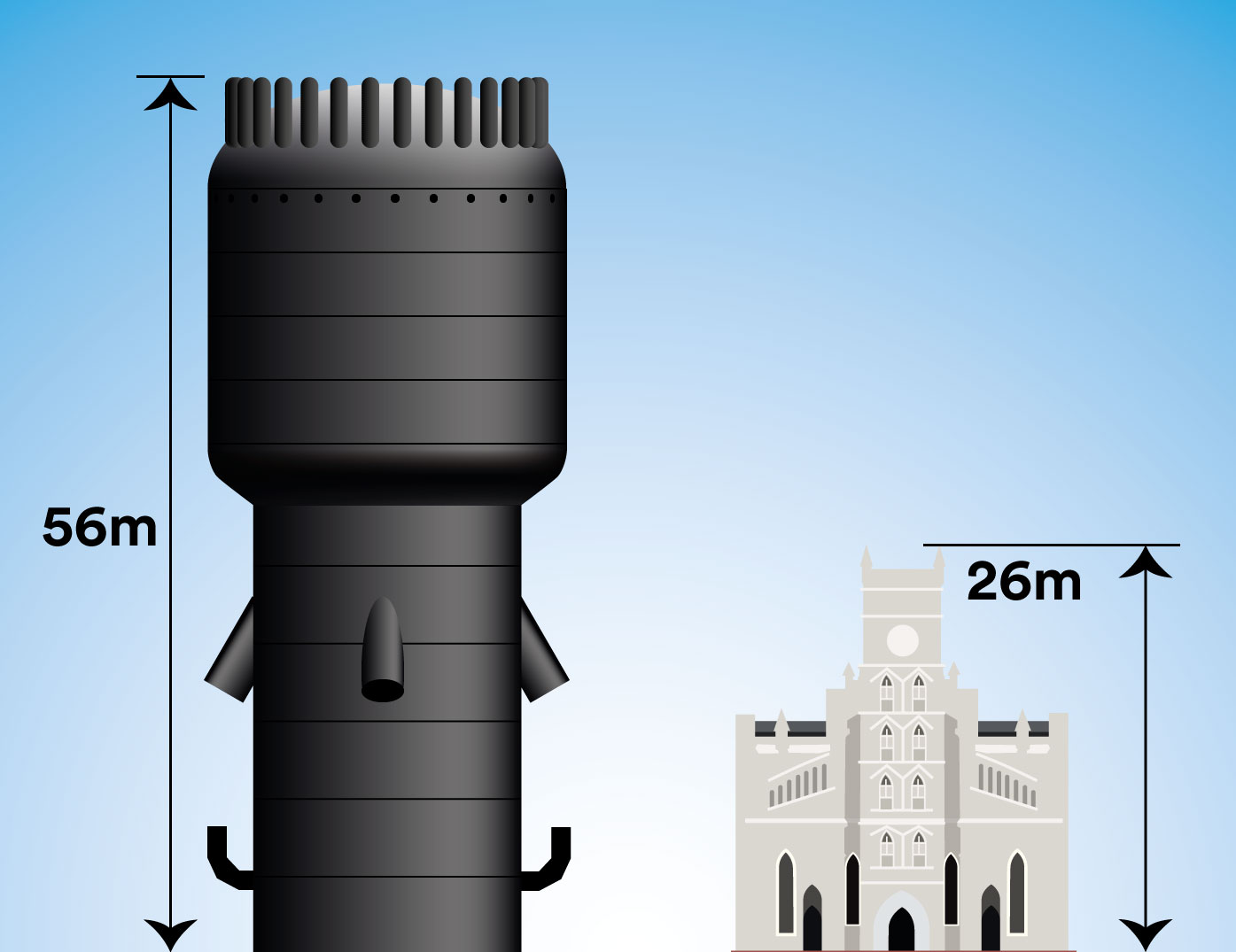
Regenerator in comparison with the Cathedral Church of Christ in the center of Lagos, Nigeria

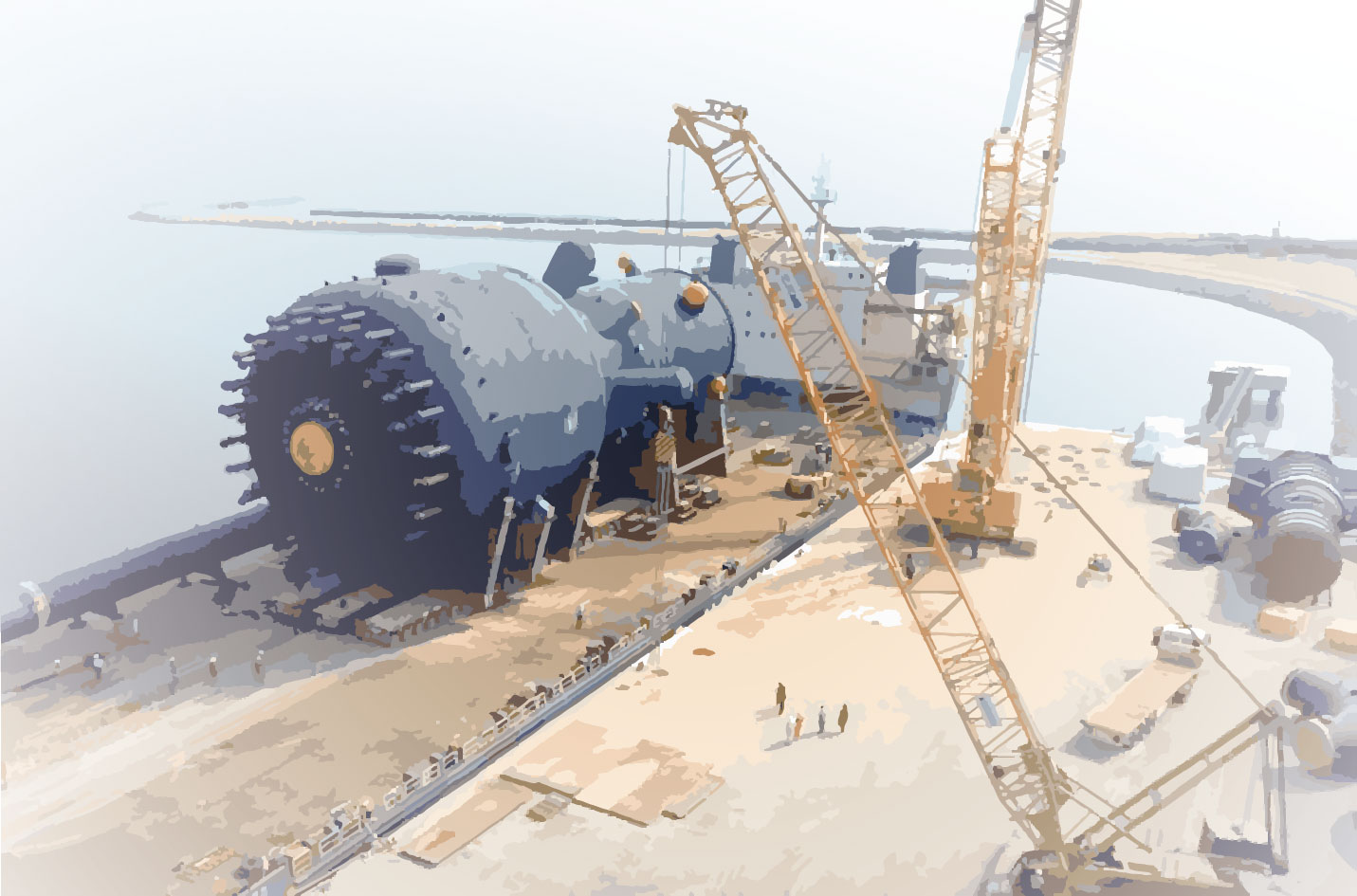
3000-ton RFCC-regenerator arrives in Lekki, allegedly the "heaviest item on an African road" in history

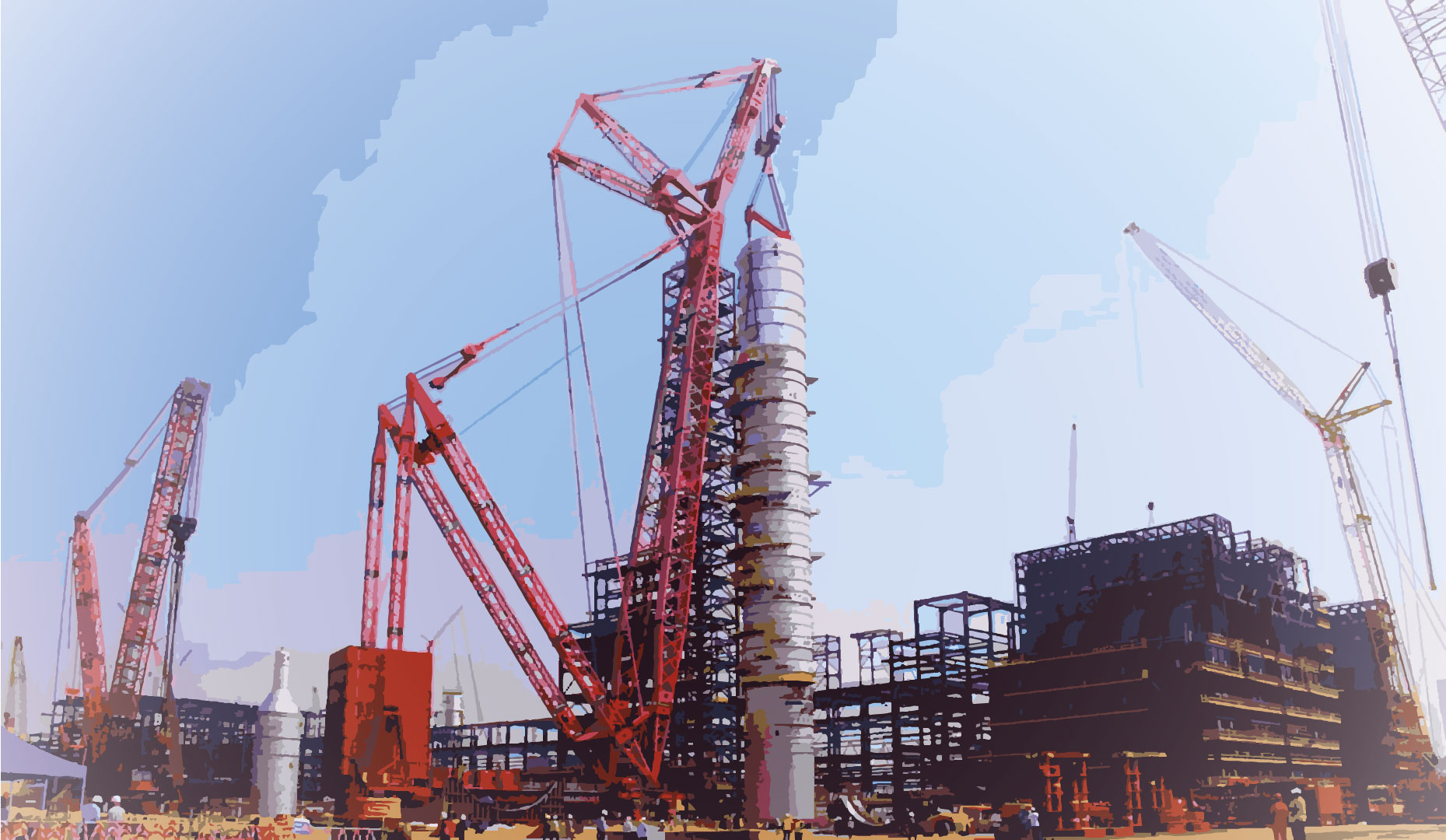
Distillation column at Dangote refinery
