= Warri Refinery =

Nigerian Refinery located in Warri

The Warri Refining & Petrochemicals Company Limited (WRPC) is situated in Warri, within Delta State, Nigeria, and began operations in 1978. This facility is a conversion refinery, with a distillation capacity of 6,250,000 metric tons annually (equivalent to 125,000 barrels per day).

== See also ==
- Port Harcourt Refining Company
- Dangote Refinery
