= ISO 639:j =

List of ISO 639-3 language codes starting with J

This is a list of ISO 639-3 language codes starting with J.

Index | a | b | c | d | e | f | g | h | i | j | k | l | m | n | o | p | q | r | s | t | u | v | w | x | y | z

Abbreviations are used in the table as follows:

- Scope: I = individual language, M = macrolanguage, S = special code
- Type: C = constructed, E = extinct (in recent times), H = historical (distinct from its modern form), L = living, S = special code

Deprecated codes are enclosed in (parentheses).

The column Family contains the generic English name of the language's family or macrolanguage.

ISO 639 codes			Scope/Type	Family	Language names	
639-3	639-1	639-2/B	Scope/Type	Family	Native	ISO name
jaa			I/L	Arawan	Arauán	Jamamadí
jab			I/L			Hyam
jac			I/L			Jakalteko; Popti'
jad			I/L			Jahanka
jae			I/L			Yabem
jaf			I/L			Jara
jah			I/L			Jah Hut
(jai)			I/L			Western Jacalteco
jaj			I/L			Zazao
jak			I/L			Jakun
jal			I/L			Yalahatan
jam			I/L		Jumiekan Patwa	Jamaican Creole English
jan			I/E			Jandai
jao			I/L			Yanyuwa
(jap)			I/L			Jaruára
jaq			I/L			Yaqay
(jar)			I/L			Jarawa (Nigeria)
jas			I/L			New Caledonian Javanese
jat			I/L	Indo-European		Jakati
jau			I/L			Yaur
jav	jv	jav	I/L	Austronesian	basa Jawa	Javanese
jax			I/L	Austronesian	bahaso Jambi	Jambi Malay
jay			I/L			Nhangu; Yan-nhangu
jaz			I/L			Jawe
jbe			I/L			Judeo-Berber
jbi			I/E			Badjiri
jbj			I/L			Arandai
jbk			I/L			Barikewa
jbm			I/L	Niger–Congo		Bijim
jbn			I/L			Nafusi
jbo		jbo	I/C		la .lojban.	Lojban
jbr			I/L			Jofotek-Bromnya
jbt			I/L			Jabutí
jbu			I/L			Jukun Takum
jbw			I/E			Yawijibaya
jcs			I/L			Jamaican Country Sign Language
jct			I/L	Turkic	кърымчах тыльы	Krymchak
jda			I/L			Jad
jdg			I/L			Jadgali
jdt			I/L			Judeo-Tat
jeb			I/L			Jebero
jee			I/L			Jerung
(jeg)			I/L			Jeng
jeh			I/L			Jeh
jei			I/L			Yei
jek			I/L			Jeri Kuo
jel			I/L			Yelmek
jen			I/L			Dza
jer			I/L			Jere
jet			I/L			Manem
jeu			I/L			Jonkor Bourmataguil
jgb			I/E			Ngbee
jge			I/L		קיברולי	Judeo-Georgian
jgk			I/L			Gwak
jgo			I/L			Ngomba
jhi			I/L			Jehai
jhs			I/L			Jhankot Sign Language
jia			I/L			Jina
jib			I/L			Jibu
jic			I/L			Tol
jid			I/L			Bu (Kaduna State)
jie			I/L			Jilbe
jig			I/L			Djingili; Jingulu
jih			I/L			Shangzhai; sTodsde
jii			I/L			Jiiddu
jil			I/L			Jilim
jim			I/L			Jimi (Cameroon)
jio			I/L			Jiamao
jiq			I/L			Guanyinqiao; Lavrung
jit			I/L			Jita
jiu			I/L	Sino-Tibetan		Youle Jinuo
jiv			I/L			Shuar
jiy			I/L	Sino-Tibetan		Buyuan Jinuo
jje			I/L	Koreanic		Jejueo
jjr			I/L			Bankal
jka			I/L	Trans–New Guinea		Kaera
jkm			I/L	Sino-Tibetan		Mobwa Karen
jko			I/L			Kubo
jkp			I/L	Sino-Tibetan		Paku Karen
jkr			I/L	Sino-Tibetan?	Koro-Aka	Koro (India)
jks			I/L			Amami Koniya Sign Language
jku			I/L			Labir
jle			I/L			Ngile
jls			I/L			Jamaican Sign Language
jma			I/L			Dima
jmb			I/L			Zumbun
jmc			I/L			Machame
jmd			I/L			Yamdena
jmi			I/L			Jimi (Nigeria)
jml			I/L			Jumli
jmn			I/L			Makuri Naga
jmr			I/L			Kamara
jms			I/L			Mashi (Nigeria)
jmw			I/L			Mouwase
jmx			I/L			Western Juxtlahuaca Mixtec
jna			I/L	Sino-Tibetan		Jangshung
jnd			I/L			Jandavra
jng			I/E			Yangman
jni			I/L			Janji
jnj			I/L			Yemsa
jnl			I/L			Rawat
jns			I/L			Jaunsari
job			I/L			Joba
jod			I/L	Niger–Congo?		Wojenaka
jog			I/L	Indo-European		Jogi
jor			I/E			Jorá
jos			I/L			Jordanian Sign Language
jow			I/L			Jowulu
jpa			I/H	Afro-Asiatic		Jewish Palestinian Aramaic
jpn	ja	jpn	I/L	Japonic	日本語	Japanese
jpr		jpr	I/L			Judeo-Persian
jqr			I/L			Jaqaru
jra			I/L			Jarai
jrb		jrb	M/L			Judeo-Arabic
jrr			I/L			Jiru
jrt			I/L			Jakattoe
jru			I/L			Japrería
jsl			I/L			Japanese Sign Language
jua			I/L			Júma
jub			I/L			Wannu
juc			I/H	Tungusic		Jurchen
jud			I/L	Niger–Congo?		Worodougou
juh			I/L			Hõne
jui			I/E			Ngadjuri
juk			I/L			Wapan
jul			I/L			Jirel
jum			I/L			Jumjum
jun			I/L			Juang
juo			I/L			Jiba
jup			I/L			Hupdë
jur			I/L			Jurúna
jus			I/L			Jumla Sign Language
jut			I/H		jysk	Jutish
juu			I/L			Ju
juw			I/L			Wãpha
juy			I/L			Juray
jvd			I/L	Dutch Creole		Javindo
jvn			I/L			Caribbean Javanese
jwi			I/L			Jwira-Pepesa
jya			I/L	Sino-Tibetan	རྒྱལ་རོང	Jiarong
jye			I/L	Arabic		Judeo-Yemeni Arabic
jyy			I/L			Jaya

== Sources ==
- "ISO 639-2 Registration Authority". Library of Congress.
- "ISO 639-3 Registration Authority". SIL International.
- Lewis, M. Paul; Simons, Gary F.; Fennig, Charles D., eds. (2016). "Ethnologue: Languages of the World" (19th ed.). Dallas, Texas: SIL International.
