= Wase =

Wase may refer to:

- Wase language (or Wãpha), a Jukunoid language of Nigeria
- Wase, Nigeria, a town and Local Government Area in Plateau State, Nigeria
  - Wase River
  - Wase Rock, a massive rocky inselberg
- Wase Wind, a Flemish energy cooperative
- Brenson Wase (born 1952), Marshallese politician
- Christopher Wase (1625?–1690), English scholar, author, translator, and educator
- WASE, an integrated learning course conducted by Wipro Ltd.
- WASE (Women against social evil), anti-drug organization led by mothers only based in Pasighat township of Arunachal Pradesh, India
