= Jukun language =

Jukun may refer to:

- Jukun Takum language, a Jukunoid language of Cameroon used as a trade language in Nigeria
- Jukun Wapan language or Wukari, a major Jukunoid language of Nigeria
- Jukun Wurkum language or Jiba, a Jukunoid language of Nigeria
- Djugun language, an Australian Aboriginal language of Western Australia

== See also ==
- Jukunoid languages, languages spoken by the Jukun and related peoples of Nigeria and Cameroon
- Jukun (disambiguation)
