= Jukunoid languages =

Branch of Benue–Congo languages of Nigeria and Cameroon

Jukunoid
- Geographic distribution: Nigeria, Cameroon
- Linguistic classification: Niger–Congo?: Atlantic–Congo; Volta-Congo; Benue–Congo; Central Nigerian; Jukunoid

Language codes
- Glottolog: juku1257
- The Jukunoid languages shown within Nigeria and Cameroon

The Jukunoid languages are a branch of the Benue-Congo languages spoken by the Jukun and related peoples of Nigeria and Cameroon. They are distributed mostly throughout Taraba State, Nigeria and surrounding regions.

Their asymmetrical nasal consonants are atypical for West Africa, as can be seen in Wapan.

== External relationships ==
Gerhardt (1983) and Güldemann (2018) suggest that Jukunoid may actually be part of the Plateau languages, as it shares similarities with various Plateau groups, especially Tarokoid. However, Blench (2005) argues that Jukunoid is clearly separate from Plateau.

== Classification ==
The following classification is from Glottolog; the Kororofa branch has been added from Ethnologue (Glottolog classifies the Kororofa languages as Jukun):

- Jukunoid
  - Kuteb
  - Central
    - Kpan–Icen
      - Etkywan (Icen)
      - Kpan
    - Jukun–Mbembe–Wurbo
      - Jukun
        - Jukun (Jukun Takum)
        - Jibu
        - Hõne
        - Wãpha
        - Jan Awei
      - Kororofa
        - Wannu
        - Wapan
        - Jiba
      - Mbembe (Tigon)
      - Wurbo
        - Como Karim
        - Jiru
        - Shoo-Minda-Nye

Ethnologue adds the Yukubenic branch of the Plateau languages as part of a Yukubenic-Kuteb group based on Shimizu (1980), and Blench also follows this classification. Ethnologue also leaves the Wurbo language Shoo-Minda-Nye as unclassified within Jukun–Mbembe–Wurbo, and includes the unclassified Benue–Congo language Tita in its place.

Lau was also recently reported by Idiatov (2017).

However, Blench (2026) classifies Yukubenic and Kuteb–Kapya each as independent branches of Benue–Congo; neither are classified as either Jukunoid or Plateau. Formerly, these languages were known as South Jukunoid languages, which Blench (2026) considers to be invalid since none of them are actually branches of Jukunoid.

== Names and locations ==
Below is a list of language names, populations, and locations from Blench (2019).

Language	Branch	Cluster	Dialects	Alternate spellings	Own name for language	Endonym(s)	Other names (location-based)	Other names for language	Exonym(s)	Speakers	Location(s)	Notes
Akum						Anyar				3 villages in Nigeria; 600 in Cameroon (1976)	Taraba State, ca. 6°50N, 9°50E	
Bete										50 (2002)	Taraba State, Wukari LGA, Bete town	no data
Nyifon									Iordaa	1000 (CAPRO n.d. but probably 1990s)	Buruku LGA, Benue State	no data
Jan Awei					Jan Awei					12 ? (1997)	Gombe State, West of Muri mountains, North of the Benue (precise location unknown)	
Jukun cluster		Jukun		Njuku			Njikun			35,000 (1971 Welmers); 1700 in Cameroon (1976)	Taraba State, Wukari, Takum, Bali and Sardauna LGAs; Nasarawa State, Awe and Lafia LGAs; Plateau State, Shendam and Langtang South LGAs; Benue State, Makurdi LGA; and in Furu-Awa subdivision, Cameroon	
Jibu		Jukun	Gayam, Garbabi							25,000 (1987 SIL)	Taraba State, Gashaka LGA	
Takum-Donga		Jukun	Takum, Donga					Jibu		Second language speakers only 40,000 (1979 UBS)	Taraba State, Takum, Sardauna and Bali LGAs	
Wase Tofa		Jukun									Plateau State, Shendam and Langtang South LGAs	
Jukun–Mbembe–Wurbo group	Jukun–Mbembe–Wurbo											
Kororofa cluster	Jukun–Mbembe–Wurbo	Kororofa					Jukun			more than 62,000 (SIL)		
Abinsi	Jukun–Mbembe–Wurbo	Kororofa				Wapan	River Jukun				Taraba State, Wukari LGA, at Sufa and Kwantan Sufa; Benue State, Makurdi LGA, at Abinsi	
Wapan	Jukun–Mbembe–Wurbo	Kororofa			Wapan		Wukari and Abinsi			60,000 (1973 SIL)	Taraba State, Wukari LGA; Nasarawa State, Awe and Lafia LGAs; Plateau State, Shendam and Langtang South LGAs (precise areas uncertain)	
Hone	Jukun–Mbembe–Wurbo	Kororofa					Kona			2,000 (1977 Voegelin & Voegelin)	Taraba State, Karim Lamido LGA; Plateau State, Wase LGA. Villages north and west of Jalingo	
Dampar	Jukun–Mbembe–Wurbo	Kororofa									Taraba State, Wukari LGA, at Dampar	
Mbembe Tigong cluster	Jukun–Mbembe–Wurbo	Mbembe Tigong				Noale	Tigong, Tigun, Tugun, Tukun, Tigum	Akonto, Nzare		2,900 in Nigeria (1973 SIL)	Taraba State, Sardauna LGA; mainly in Cameroon	
Ashuku	Jukun–Mbembe–Wurbo	Mbembe Tigong		Ashaku		Ákә́tsә̀kpә́, Ákúcùkpú		Kitsipki				
Nama	Jukun–Mbembe–Wurbo	Mbembe Tigong		Dama, Namu	Kporo			Nzare ‘I say so’; Eneeme				
Shoo–Minda–Nye cluster	Wurbo	Shoo–Minda–Nye	May be related to Jessi spoken between Lau and Lankoviri							10,000 (SIL)	Taraba State, Karim Lamido LGA	
Shoo	Wurbo	Shoo–Minda–Nye		Shóó	dàŋ Shóó	Nwii Shóó			Banda, Bandawa			
Minda	Wurbo	Shoo–Minda–Nye					Jinleri					
Nye	Wurbo	Shoo–Minda–Nye		Nyé	Nyé	Nwi Nyé			Kunini			
Jiru	Wurbo			Zhiru				Atak, Wiyap, Kir			Taraba State, Karim Lamido LGA	
Etkywan	Kpan–Icen			Icen, Ichen, Itchen	Kentu, Kya)tõ, Kyanton, Nyidu					6,330 in Donga district (1952 W&B); more than 7,000 (1973 SIL)	Taraba State, Takum and Sardauna LGAs	
Kpan	Kpan–Icen		Western and Eastern groups: Western: 1 Kumbo–Takum Group: Kumbo (Kpanzon), Takum; 2 Donga (Akpanzhĩ; 3 Bissaula (extinct) Eastern: Apa (per Kilham), Kente, Eregba (per Koelle)	Kpanten, Ikpan, Akpanzhi, Kpanzon, Abakan				Kpwate, Hwaye, Hwaso, Nyatso, Nyonyo, Yorda, Ibukwo			Taraba State, Wukari, Takum and Sardaunda LGAs	
Como–Karim	Wurbo			Shomoh, Shomong, Chomo, Shomo			Karim, Kirim	Kiyu, Nuadhu			Taraba State, Karim Lamido and Jalingo LGAs	
Tita	Wurbo										Taraba State, Jalingo LGA, at Hoai Petel	Blench was not able to identify the people or the location, though Meek had data showing it to be Jukunoid.

== Numerals ==
Comparison of numerals in individual languages:

Classification	Language	1	2	3	4	5	6	7	8	9	10
Jukun-Mbembe-Wurbo, Jukun	Hõne (Pindiga/Gwana)	zùŋ	pyèːnè	sáːré	nyẽ́	sɔ́nɛ́	sùnjé	sùnpyèːnè	hūnnè	sīnyáu	dùb
Jukun-Mbembe-Wurbo, Jukun	Jibu	zyun	pyànà	sàra	yina	swana	sùnjin	sùmpyànn	awùyin	ajunndúbi	dwib
Jukun-Mbembe-Wurbo, Jukun	Wapa (Wãpha)	zùŋ	pyĩ̀	sā / sārā	nyìnā	swã̄nā	ʃẽ̀ʒí	sémpyè	sẽ̄sá	sínyáu	ádùb
Jukun-Mbembe-Wurbo, Kororofa	Jiba (Jibe / Kona)	zũ̀ː	pyèːnà	sàːr	nyè	són	sùnʒé	sùmpyèːnà	húhúnyè	zōrhōnnì	dùb
Jukun-Mbembe-Wurbo, Kororofa	Wapan Jukun	dzun	pyìnà	tsara	nyena	tswana	cìnjen / ʃìʒen (5+ 1)	tsùpyìn (5+ 2)	tsùntsa (5+ 3)	tsùnyò (5+ 4)	dzwe
Jukun-Mbembe-Wurbo, Mbembe	Tigon Mbembe	nzo	pya	sra	nyɛ	tʃwɔ́	tʃwɔ́mbazo (5+ 1)	tʃwɔ́mbapya (5+ 2)	ɛ́nyɛnyɛ (2 x 4) ??	tʃwɔ́mnyɛ (5+ 4)	dʒé
Yukuben-Kuteb	Akum	ájì	afã̀	ata	aɲɪ̀	acóŋ	acóŋ jì (5+ 1)	acóŋ afã̀ (5+ 2)	acóŋ ata (5+ 3)	acóŋ ɲì (5+ 4)	īkùr(ù)
Yukuben-Kuteb	Kapya	ūŋɡēmé	īfɡɔ̀	ītà	īɲɨɪ̀	ìtú	tú ŋɡì (5+ 1)	tú ófɡõ (5+ 2)	tú àtà (5+ 3)	tú īɲɨɪ̀ (5+ 4)	èbʲí / èbzí
Yukuben-Kuteb	Kuteb (Kutev) (1)	kínzō	ífaẽ	ítā	índʒē	ítsóŋ	ítsóŋ-ndʒō (5+ 1)	ítsóŋ-ífaẽ (5+ 2)	ítsóŋ-ítā (5+ 3)	ítsóŋ-ndʒē (5+ 4)	ridʒwēr
Yukuben-Kuteb	Kuteb (Kutev) (2)	kínzō	ifaen	itā	inje	itsóŋ	itsóŋ-nzō (5+ 1)	itsóŋ-faen (5+ 2)	itsóŋ-tā (5+ 3)	itsóŋ-nje (5+ 4)	rijwēr
Yukuben-Kuteb	Yukuben	kítə́ŋ	āpá(ŋ)	ātà, ārà	ēnzì	otòŋ	(ō)̄tòŋ kíhín (5+ 1)	(ō)̄tòŋ āpá (5+ 2)	(ō)̄tòŋ ātà / ārà (5+ 3)	(ō)̄tòŋ ēnzì (5+ 4)	kùr

== See also ==
- List of Proto-Jukunoid reconstructions (Wiktionary)
