= Lufu language =

Atlantic–Congo language of Nigeria

Lufu
- Native to: Nigeria
- Region: Taraba State
- Native speakers: 3,200 (2006)
- Language family: Niger–Congo?: Atlantic–Congo; Benue–Congo; Plateau; Yukubenic; Bete–Lufu; Lufu

Language codes
- ISO 639-3: ldq
- Glottolog: lufu1237
- ELP: Lufu

The Lufu language is a Yukubenic language of Nigeria, still spoken mostly by older adults among the Lufu people of the Takum Local Government Authority, Taraba State; its speakers have mostly shifted to Jukun. It is close to Bete.

== Bibliography ==
- Crozier, David H. and Roger M. Blench, editors. 1992. An index of Nigerian languages. Abuja, Nigeria and Dallas: Nigerian Language Development Centre, Department of Linguistics and Nigerian Languages, University of Ilorin, and Summer Institute of Linguistics.
