= Yukubenic languages =

Language family

Yukubenic
- Oohum
- Geographic distribution: Nigeria
- Linguistic classification: Niger–Congo?: Atlantic–Congo; Benue–Congo; Jukunoid? Plateau?; Yukubenic

Language codes
- Glottolog: yuku1243

The Yukubenic languages (or Oohum languages; formerly South Jukunoid) are a branch of the Benue–Congo languages. It has also been classified as a subgroup of either the Jukunoid family or the Plateau family spoken in southeastern Nigeria. Glottolog places Yukubenic in the Plateau family. Ethnologue, however, places Yukubenic in the Jukunoid family, based on Shimizu (1980). Blench (2026) proposes that Yukubenic is not a branch of Jukunoid or Plateau, but rather an independent branch of Benue–Congo. Similarities with Plateau are due to contact rather than genetic affiliation.

== Classification ==
The Yukubenic languages are:

- Bete, Lufu
- Kapya
- Afudu
- Akum, Beezen–Baazəm
- Yukuben (Uuhum Gigi)

Yukubenic has considerable internal lexical diversity. However, Blench (2026) does not consider Kuteb and Kapya to Yukubenic languages. Rather, Kuteb–Kapya is an independent branch of Benue–Congo in the classification of Blench (2026).

== Names and locations ==
Below is a list of language names, populations, and locations from Blench (2019).

Language	Branch	Dialects	Alternate spellings	Own name for language	Endonym(s)	Other names (location-based)	Other names for language	Exonym(s)	Speakers	Location(s)
Kapya	Yukuben–Kutep									Taraba State, Takum LGA, at Kapya
Kuteb	Yukuben–Kutep	Lissam, Fikyu, Jenuwa, Rufu, Kentin: Fikyu has sub–dialects	Kutev, Kutep			Ati (Administrative name in Cameroon)	Mbarike, Zumper (Jompre) (not recommended)		15,592 (1952 W&B); 30,000 (1986 UBS); 1400 in Cameroon (1976)	Taraba State, Takum LGA and in Cameroon, Furu Awa subdivision
Yukuben	Yukuben–Kutep		Nyikuben, Nyikobe, Ayikiben, Yikuben		Oohum, Uuhum		Boritsu, Balaabe	Uuhum-Gigi in Cameroon	10,000 (1971 Welmers); 1,000 in Cameroon (1976)	Taraba State, Takum LGA; and in Furu-Awa subdivision, Cameroon
