= List of rivers of Nigeria =

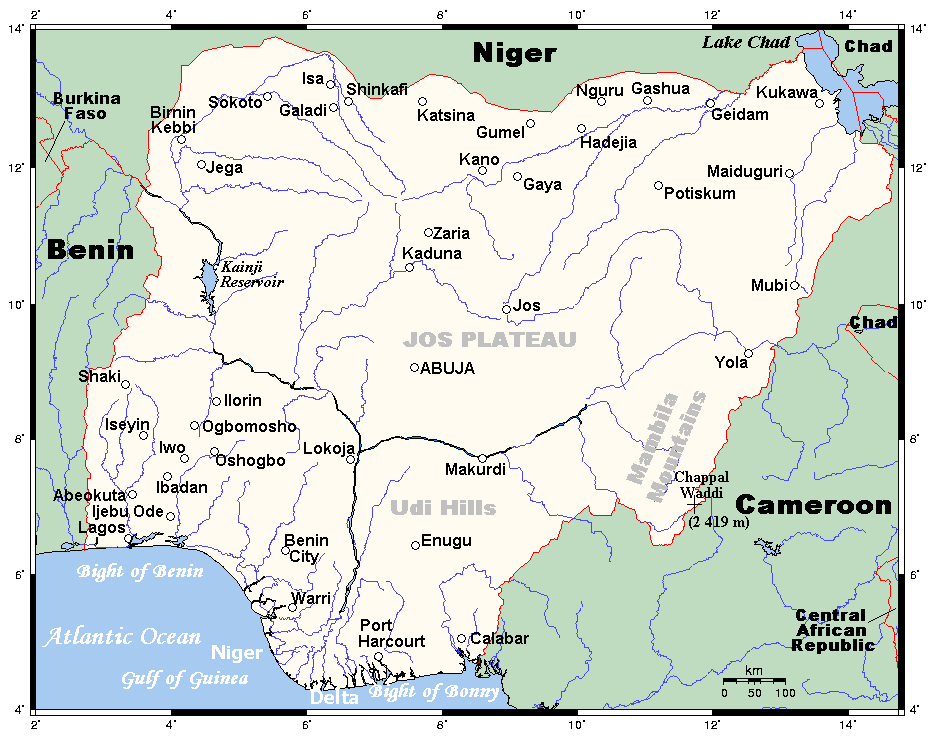
Map showing the major rivers of Nigeria.

This is a list of rivers of Nigeria. This list is arranged by drainage basin and from west to east, with respective tributaries indented under each larger stream's name.

== Atlantic Ocean ==
- Ouémé River
- Okpara River
- Ogun River
- Oyan River
- Ofiki River
- Ona River (Awna River)
- Ogunpa River
- Osun River
- Erinle River
- Otin River
- Oba River
- Omi Osun
- Benin River
- Osse River
- Niger River
- Escravos River (distributary)
- Forcados River (distributary)
- Chanomi Creek (distributary)
- Nun River (distributary)
- New Calabar River (distributary)
- Anambra River
- Benue River
- Okwa River
- Mada River
- Katsina Ala River
- Menchum River
- Ankwe River
- Orisa River
- Donga River
- Bantaji River (Suntai River)
- Wase River
- Taraba River
- Kam River
- Pai River
- Gongola River
- Hawal River
- Faro River
- Gurara River
- Kaduna River
- Mariga River
- Tubo River
- Galma River (Nigeria)
- Moshi River
- Teshi River
- Oli River
- Malendo River
- Sokoto River
- Ka River
- Zamfara River
- Gaminda River
- Rima River
- Goulbi de Maradi River
- Gagere River
- Bunsuru River
- Bonny River
- Imo River
- Aba River
- Otamiri River
- Kwa Ibo River
- Cross River
- Akwayafe River
- Great Kwa River
- Calabar River
- Asu River
- Aboine River
- Ekulu River
- Anyim River
- Oji River

== Lake Chad ==
- Yobe River
  - Komadugu Gana River
  - Jama'are River (Bunga River)
    - Katagum River
  - Hadejia River
    - Chalawa River
      - Kano River
      - Watari River
- Ngadda River
- Yedseram River
