= Zamfara River =

River of Nigeria

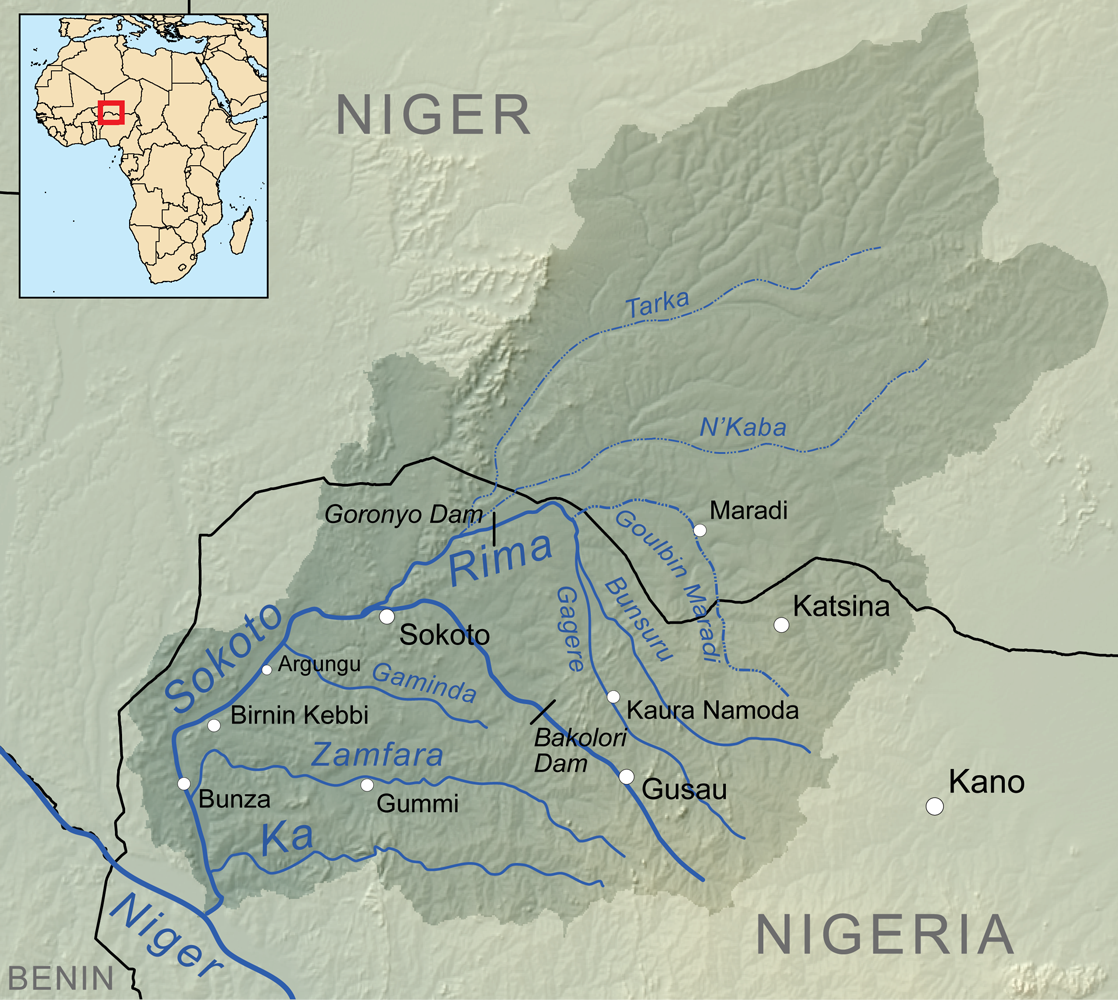
- Sokoto river basin, Zamfara river to the south

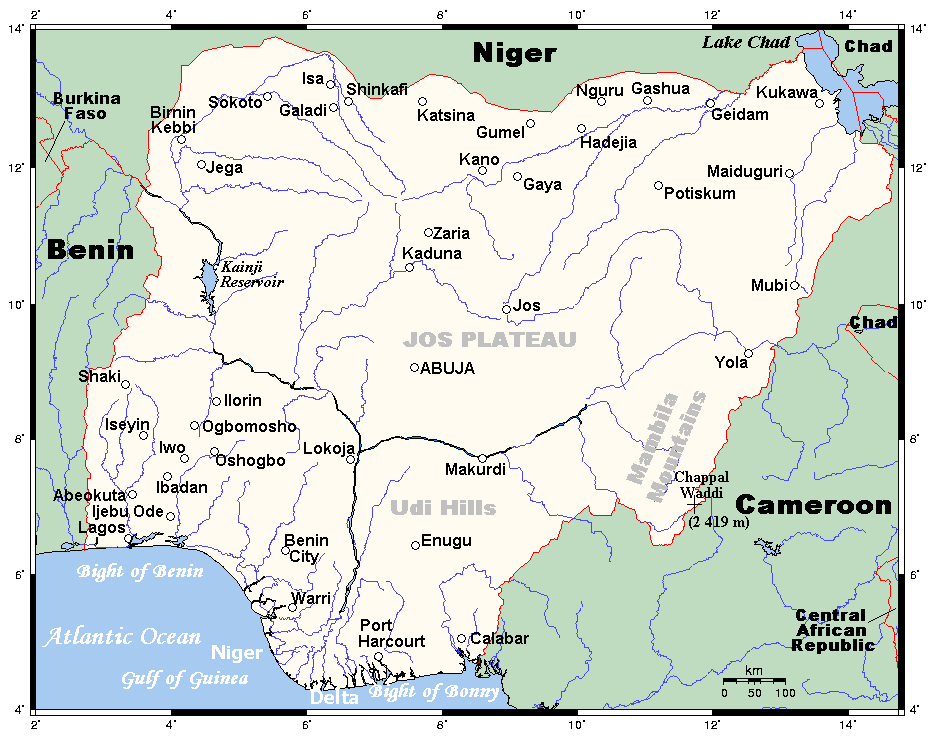
- Major rivers of Nigeria

- Location of mouth

Location
- Country: Nigeria
- State: Zamfara

Physical characteristics
- Mouth: Sokoto River
  - coordinates: 11°59′46″N 4°05′25″E
- Length: 250 km (160 mi)

Basin features
- River system: Sokoto River

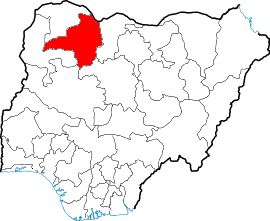
The Zamfara State, in which the Zamfara River originates.

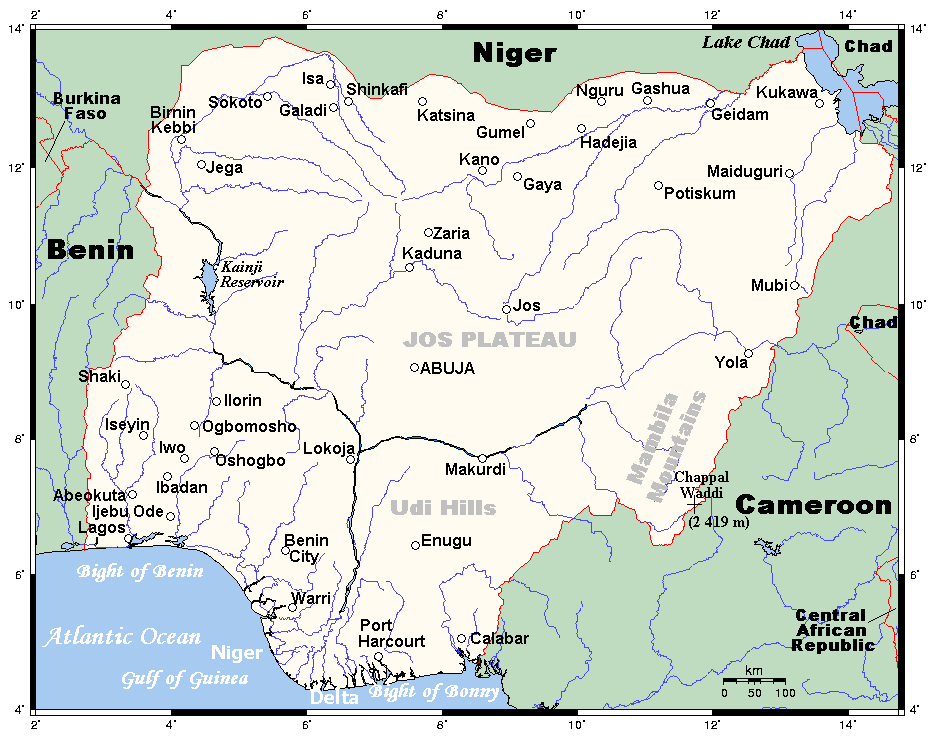
Map showing the major rivers of Nigeria.

The Zamfara River is a river in the northern part of Nigeria. Originating in Zamfara State, it runs 250 kilometres (160 mi) west into Kebbi State where it joins with the Sokoto River some 50 kilometres (31 mi) southwest of Birnin Kebbi.

At its highest point the Zamfara River flows through an area that is 188 metres (617 ft) above sea level. Zamfara River has different names associated with in different region that it flows through. Some of the most common ones include Gulbi Gindi, Gulbi Zamfara, River Zamfara, and River Gindi.

== Terrorist attack ==
On the 6th of October 2022, it was confirmed that villagers living around the river, drowned while trying to escape terrorist attack.

=== The hydrological patterns and varieties of surface spillover in Hadejia stream ===
The river catchment were evaluated utilizing information traversing 36 years, (1980-2015), for legitimate preparation and the board of water assets in the bowl. New hydrological knowledge for the district: The worldly and spatial abnormalities in the spillover of Hadeia stream catchment has been distinguished. A critical decline of waterway release, from two out of the three downstream stations, had been noticed. Be that as it may, there is a rising pattern of the waterway release from every one of the three upstream stations, however measurably unimportant. The ANOVA [F (5,210) = 106.226, P < 0.05] and group investigation results showed huge spatial varieties between the upstream and downstream stations. The rising pattern of the release in the upstream stations is owing to high precipitation mean and expanded urbanization nearby. Be that as it may, the huge diminishing pattern of the release downstream of the stream catchment is related to many variables, strikingly; high vanishing rate because of high temperature, low precipitation mean and the somewhat high penetration rate empowered by the high level of sandy soil and the sedimentary land development. Water supply and irrigation, particularly in the downstream areas, are in jeopardy as a result of these trends and variations. As a result, an integrated basin study utilizing hydrological modeling will be helpful in determining the distinct impacts of the contributing factors and predicting how the river will behave in response to those impacts.

== Pollution ==
Northern Nigeria in Zamfara State, due to the outbreak in two villages, a team travelled and began the investigation to ascertain the cause of the outbreak. Resident in each village reported that one-fourth of all the children in their communities had died in the previous year. The community wells had high levels of lead which in return caused the children in both villages had high level of lead in their blood.

== See also ==
- List of rivers of Nigeria
