= Shoo-Minda-Nye language =

Jukunoid language spoken in Nigeria

Shoo-Minda-Nye
- manda
- Native to: Nigeria
- Region: Taraba State
- Native speakers: (10,000 cited 1973)
- Language family: Niger–Congo?: Atlantic–Congo; Benue–Congo; Jukunoid; Central; (unclassified); Shoo-Minda-Nye
- Dialects: Shoo (Banda); Minda(Manda); Nye (Kunini)

Language codes
- ISO 639-3: bcv
- Glottolog: shoo1247

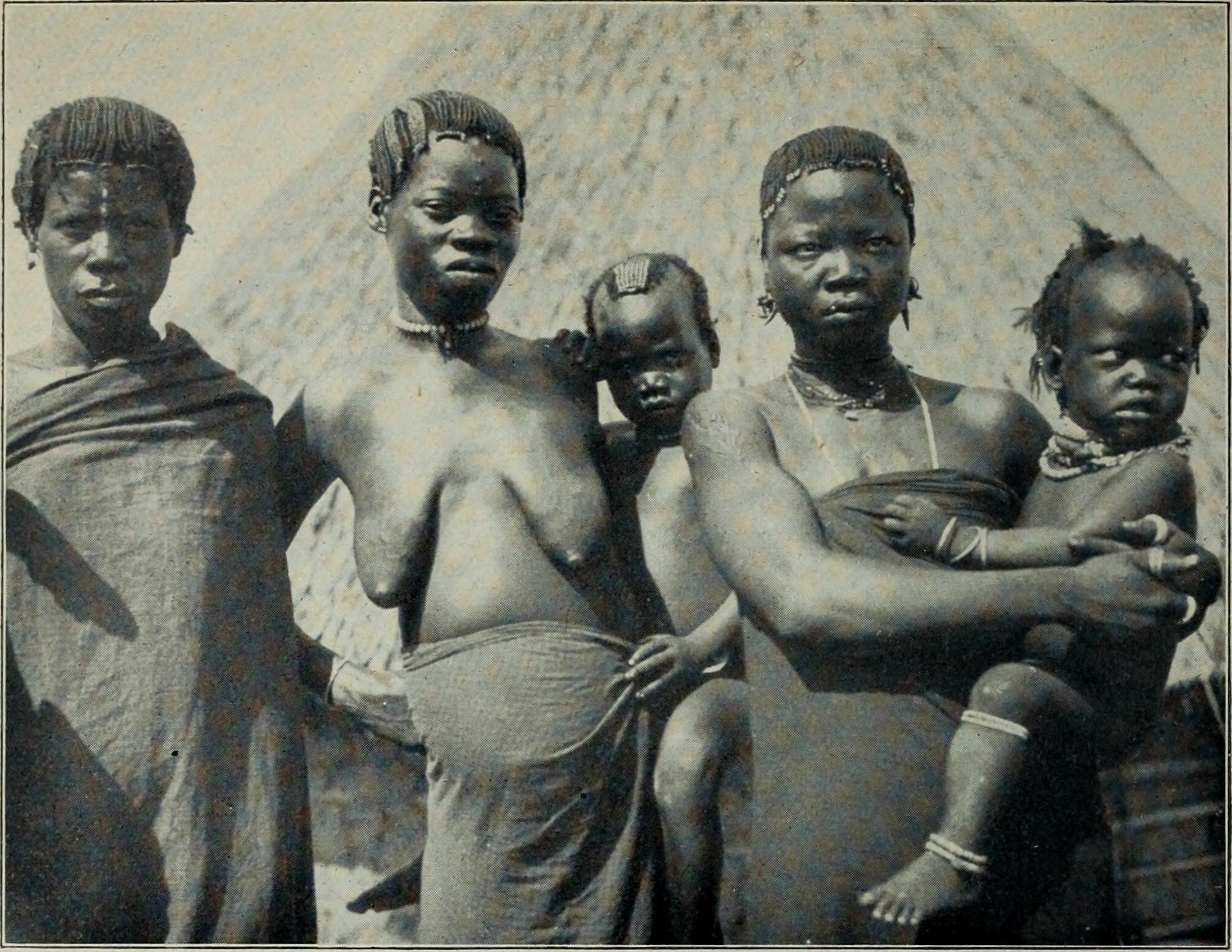
Banda Woman

Shoo, Minda and Nye are the three constituent dialects of a Jukunoid language of Nigeria which has no unitary name.

Minda is spoken widely by the people who live in Minda, in present day Lau Local Government Area of Taraba State.
