= Jiru =

Jiru may refer to:

- Jiru language, a language of Nigeria
- Jiru, a town in Moretna Jiru, Ethiopia
- Jiru (Han dynasty) (籍孺: "the boy Ji"), a historical figure of the early Han Empire
- Chen Jiru (陳繼儒; 1558–1639), Chinese painter

== See also ==
- Djiru (disambiguation)
- Giru (disambiguation)
