= Bete language (Nigeria) =

Endangered Plateau language of Nigeria

Bete
- Native to: Bete Town, Takum Local Government Authority, Taraba State, Nigeria.
- Ethnicity: 3,000 Bete (no date)
- Native speakers: (50 cited 1992)
- Language family: Niger–Congo?: Atlantic–Congo; Benue–Congo; Plateau; Yukubenic; Bete–Lufu; Bete

Language codes
- ISO 639-3: byf
- Glottolog: bete1261
- ELP: Bete

The Bete language of Nigeria is a nearly extinct language spoken by a small minority of the 3,000 inhabitants of Bete Town, Takum, Taraba State; its speakers have mostly shifted to Jukun Takum. It is close to Lufu.

== See also ==
- Bete people

== Sources ==
- Crozier, David H. and Roger M. Blench, editors. 1992. An index of Nigerian languages. Abuja, Nigeria and Dallas: Nigerian Language Development Centre, Department of Linguistics and Nigerian Languages, University of Ilorin, and Summer Institute of Linguistics.
