= Kpan language =

Jukunoid language of Nigeria

Kpan
- Native to: Nigeria
- Region: Taraba State
- Native speakers: (11,000 cited 2000)
- Language family: Niger–Congo?: Atlantic–Congo; Benue–Congo; Jukunoid; Central; Kpan–Icen; Kpan

Language codes
- ISO 639-3: kpk
- Glottolog: kpan1246
- ELP: Kpan

Kpan is a Jukunoid language of Taraba State, Nigeria. There are several dialects.

Ethnologue (22nd ed.) lists Gayan, Gindin Dutse, Kato Bagha, Likam, Suntai, and Wukari villages, which are distributed in Sardauna, Takum, and Wukari LGAs.

== Phonology ==
Kpan has the following phonology

Consonants
	Labial	Alveolar	Palatal (alveolar)	Velar	Labiovelar
Stop	p, b, ᵐb	t, d, ⁿd		k, g, ᵑɡ	kʷ, gʷ
Affricate		t͡s, d͡z			
Fricative	f, v	s, z	ʃ, ʒ	x, ɣ	
Trill		r			
Aproximant			j	w	

Vowels
	Front	Middle	Back
High	i		u
High Mid	e		o
Low		a	

1. Vowels can be nasalized, turning preceding pre nasalized stops in nasals
2. There is no stress
3. The syllable structure is (C)(C)V of which the second consonant can be /ʃ, ʒ, j, k, g, w/, [ŋ]
4. There are 3 level tones
