= Wannu =

Wannu may be,

- Wannu language, Nigeria
- Puxian Wannu, Jurchen warlord
