= Como Karim language =

Jukunoid language of Nigeria

Como Karim
- Kiyu; Ladthu
- Native to: Nigeria
- Region: Northern Taraba State and eastern Plateau State
- Native speakers: (11,000 cited 2000)
- Language family: Niger–Congo?: Atlantic–Congo; Benue–Congo; Jukunoid; Central; Wurbo; Como Karim

Language codes
- ISO 639-3: cfg
- Glottolog: como1258

Como Karim (Chomo / Shomo, Kirim) is a Jukunoid language of Taraba State, Nigeria. The language is spoken by two groups of people who refer to themselves as the Kiyu and Ladthu (Nuadhu), respectively.

== Background ==
Speakers consist of two groups:

1. The Karinjo or Karimjo group, who refer to themselves as Kiyu. They reside in the town of Karim Lamido.
2. The Como group, who call themselves the Ladthu or la-dhu. They live to the south of the Karim.

Together, these two groups make up the Como Karim people.
