= Kuteb =

Kuteb or Kutep may refer to:

- Kuteb people, an ethnolinguistic grope of Nigeria and Cameroon
- Kuteb language, the language spoken by them
