= Jukun =

Jukun or Djugun or Dyugun may refer to:

- Jukun people (West Africa)
- Jukun Takum language
- Jukun people (Australia)
- Jukun language (disambiguation)
- Djugun, Western Australia, suburb of Broome
