= Giru =

Giru may refer to:

- Giru, Queensland, in Australia
- Giru (Dragon Ball GT), a character from the Dragon Ball GT series
- Giru of Baekje, third king of Baekje
- Giru Qowl, a village in Bamyan Province, Afghanistan
- Giru, Iran, a village in East Azerbaijan Province, Iran

== See also ==
- Jiru (disambiguation)
