= Kapya =

Kapya may be,

- Kapya language
- Kapya Kaoma
