= Mbembe =

Mbembe can be:

- Achille Mbembe, Cameroonian philosopher and political scientist
- Mbembe language, Cross-River language of Nigeria
- Tigon Mbembe language, Jukunoid language of Cameroon
- Mokele-Mbembe, water dwelling cryptid of the Congo basin
