= Etkywan language =

Jukunoid language of Nigeria

Etkywan
- Icen
- Native to: Nigeria
- Region: Taraba
- Native speakers: (50,000 cited 2000)
- Language family: Niger–Congo?: Atlantic–Congo; Benue–Congo; Jukunoid; Central; Kpan–Icen; Etkywan

Language codes
- ISO 639-3: ich
- Glottolog: etky1238

Etkywan (Etekwe), or Icen (Itchen), also known as Kentu or Nyidu, is a Jukunoid language of Nigeria.
