= Ubu River =

River in Nigeria

Ubu River River Ubu, Ụbụ Achịta River

Location
- Countries: Nigeria

Physical characteristics
- Mouth: Anambra State
- Basin size: 7,130 km^{2} (2,750 sq mi)
- Discharge
  - average: 256 m^{3}/s (9,000 cu ft/s)

Ubu River is a river located in the Otolo area in Anambra State, southeastern Nigeria. It flows through Ekwusigo and Nnewi North Local Government Areas, where it forms part of the local drainage system and serves surrounding communities. The river has been the subject of environmental studies because of industrial and urban activities along its course.

== Geography ==
River Ubu flows across Ekwusigo and Nnewi North Local Government Areas of Anambra State. Its banks support vegetation and agricultural land, while the river contributes to surface drainage within the region.

== Environmental studies ==
Several scientific studies have examined the water and soil quality of the Ubu River. Research has reported seasonal variations in water quality and assessed the effects of industrial, domestic, and agricultural activities on the river and its surrounding areas.

== See also ==
- List of rivers of Nigeria
- Anambra State
