= Jan Awei language =

Moribund Jukunoid language of Nigeria

Jan Awei
- Native to: Nigeria
- Region: Gombe State
- Native speakers: (12? cited 1997)
- Language family: Niger–Congo?: Atlantic–Congo; Benue–Congo; Jukunoid; Central; Jukun; Jan Awei

Language codes
- ISO 639-3: None (mis)
- Glottolog: jana1236

Jan Awei is a moribund Jukunoid language of Nigeria. It had around 12 speakers in 1997 and was spoken in an area west of the Muri Mountains in the far south of Gombe State, however the precise location is unknown.
