= Hõne language =

Jukunoid language of Nigeria

Hõne
- Native to: Nigeria
- Region: Gombe State and Taraba State
- Native speakers: (7,000 cited 1999)
- Language family: Niger–Congo?: Atlantic–Congo; Benue–Congo; Jukunoid; Central; Jukun; Hõne
- Dialects: Pindiga; Gwana

Language codes
- ISO 639-3: juh
- Glottolog: hone1235
- ELP: Hõne

Hõne is a Jukunoid language spoken in Gombe State and Taraba State, Nigeria. Speakers of the two dialects, Pindiga and Gwana, can only understand each other with difficulty. It belongs to the Jukun Wapan (Kororofa) language cluster.

== Distribution ==
Hõne is spoken in Akko, Billiri, Shongom, and Karim-Lamido LGAs. Ethnologue (22nd ed.) lists villages as:

- Futuk, Kaltanga, Kashere, Pindiga, and Tumu villages (Pindiga dialect)
- Andamin, Digare, Dizi, Gobirawa, Gwana, Jukon, Kasan Dare, Katagum, Konan Kuka, and Kwaya villages (Gwana dialect)
