= Jibu language =

Jukunoid language of Nigeria

Jibu
- Native to: Nigeria
- Region: Taraba State
- Native speakers: (30,000 cited 1997)
- Language family: Niger–Congo?: Atlantic–Congo; Benue–Congo; Jukunoid; Central; Jukun; Jibu

Language codes
- ISO 639-3: jib
- Glottolog: jibu1239

Jibu is a Jukunoid language spoken in the Taraba State of Nigeria by 30,000 people.

== Phonology ==
In Jibu, there are 18 consonant phonemes, 9 vowels (which are represented just using three letters), and three tones (rising, mid-level, and falling). In Jibu, nasalization, labialization, and palatalization are considered to be part of the syllable, and are written along with it after the vowel. Nasalization is represented with n, except when it is at the end of a syllable it becomes doubled (/kʲã/ becomes kyann). Labialization is represented with w, and palatalization with y respectively.

=== Vowels ===
In Jibu, there are 9 phonemically different vowels, which are represented by ⟨a⟩, ⟨i⟩, and ⟨o⟩. A tenth sound resembling /u/, is only used in loanwords from other languages, such as the neighboring Hausa, and is represented by ⟨u⟩.

Table of vowels in Jibu
	Front	Central	Back
Close	i /i/	i /ɨ/	u /u/
Open Mid	a /ɛ/		
Close Mid	a /e/		o /o/
Open Mid			a /ɔ/
Near Open	a /æ/		
Open		a /a/	

=== Consonants ===
Jibu has 18 different consonant phonemes. Some different phonemes are represented by the same symbol, such as /ʃ/ and /s/ being both represented as ⟨s⟩ in their older modified Americanist Phonetic Notation orthographic forms. If all of the consonant phonemes are represented using their older Americanist Phonetic Notation counterparts, there is no orthographic overlap. The sound /ɗ/, which is used in some Hausa loanwords, is commonly represented using ⟨'d⟩.

Jibu consonants
		Labial	Alveolar	Palato-alveolar	Palatal	Velar
Nasal		m /m/	n, l /n/			ng /ŋ/
Plosive	unvoiced	p /p/	t /t/			k /k/
Plosive	voiced	b /b/	d /d/			g, ꞡ /g/
Fricative	unvoiced	f /f/	s /s/	s, š /ʃ/		
Fricative	voiced	v /v/	z, đ /z/	j, z /ʒ/		
Flap			r, ř /ɾ/			
Approximant					y /j/	w /w/

=== Tones ===
Jibu has three tones (four if the base tone is included). These tones are high (´), lowered-mid (') and low (`). The base tone is not written on words and in more recent publications, neither is the lowered-mid tone.

Comparison of Jibu tones
	Jibu	English	IPA
Rising Tone	káb	all, finish (idiophone)	/kɛ́b/
Mid-Tone	kab	to dip out, to dig, to snap off, surpass	/kɛb/
Falling Tone	kàb	provisional hut	/kɛ̀b/

== Orthography ==
The system used today in Jibu includes some symbols for transcribing sounds in Hausa loanwords, the older system, which is a slightly modified version of Americanist Phonetic Notation, does not include a symbol for the transcription of h, and includes the fact that multiple phonemes are transcribed as a single symbol in multiple cases.

Modern System	Previous System (Modified APN)	IPA
m	m	/m/
n	n, l	/n/
ng, ŋ	ng, ŋ	/ŋ/
b	b	/b/
d	d	/d/
g	g, ꞡ	/g/
p	p	/p/
t	t	/t/
k	k	/k/
v	v	/v/
f	f	/f/
y	y	/j/
w	w	/w/
r	r, ř	/ɾ/
z	z, đ	/z/
j	j, z	/ʒ/
s	s	/s/
sh	s, š	/ʃ/
'd	'd	/ɗ/
h	-	/h/

== Verbs ==
In Jibu, verbs are not conjugated, which is a common aspect among Junkanoid languages. Instead, the pronoun is placed before the verb, and all aspect markers are placed before the pronoun.

Intransitive: á (work! - á sar)

Continuative action: ri (are working - ri sar)

Completed action: hiŋ (did work - hiŋ sar)

Completive action: rìg, rìghiŋ (work has been completed - rìg sar)

== Pronouns ==
Jibu pronouns do not reflect gender, the word wá meaning he, she, or it, unlike English, does not have multiple forms based on gender.

	1st Person	2nd Person	3rd Person
Singular	mí (I)	wú (you)	wá (he, she, it)
Plural	yá (we)	ná (you pl.)	bá (they)

== Phrases ==
- Good afternoon - aku àyúnn-à
- Good morning - bib kyàr
- Sorry! - àtau!
- Hurry! - á àzwab!
- Hello, thank you - ísoko, soko

== Literature ==
=== Biblical Texts ===
==== Psalm 100 ====
This text of the 100th psalm is presented in the standardized non-Americanist Phonetic Notation literary orthography.

Line	Original	IPA	Translation
[1]	Mpirká á byar á myann níng bidim pár,	/m͡piɾ.ká á bʲaɾ á mʲæ̃ níŋ bɨ.dim páɾ/	Shout to the Lord all the earth!
[1]	Abig dài swam yan Shinn Luyí ma pìkyinn àjwár.	/æ.bɨg dài sʷam yan ʃĩ lu.jí ma pì.kʲĩ à.ʒʷáɾ/	Shout to the Lord all the earth!
[2]	Aning wib Shinn Luyi ma pìkyinn mìmìg,	/an.iŋ wib ʃĩ lu.ji ma pì.kʲĩ mì.mìg/	Serve the Lord with joy.
[2]	Aning bi á pyànnwá ni ma jonn àjwár.	/an.iŋ bɨ á pʲàn.nʷá ni ma ʒõ à.ʒʷáɾ/	Come before him with a joyful shout!
[3]	Aning yì rag Shinn Luyí shi sig ni Shìdun.	/an.iŋ jì ɾag ʃĩ lu.jí ʃi sig nɨ ʃì.dun/	Acknowledge that the Lord is God.
[3]	Ku màm sig yi ínì, Yi shi sig í buwá, Yi í bìr mpìrká buwá.	/ku màm sɨg ji ɨ́nì – ji ʃi sɨg í bu.wá – ji í bìr m͡pìr.ká bu.wá/	He made us and we belong to him;
[3]	Ku ri pyag yi àràg barà, mpìr ri pyag bu apyagká buwá.	/ku ɾi pʲag ji àræ̀g ba.rà – m͡pìɾ ɾi pʲag bu apʲag.ká bu.wá/	We are his people, and the sheep of his pasture.
[4]	Aning kà bi á lu Shìdun ma jonn, Aning sa ya ku í soko.	/a.niŋ kà bi á lu ʃì.dun ma ʒõ, a.niŋ sa ja ku í so.ko/	Enter his gates with thanksgiving and his courts with praise.
[4]	Aning swam yan ku sai-à na kà á fir luwá ni.	/a.niŋ sʷam jan ku sai à næ kà á fiɾ lu.wá ni/	Thank him and bless his name,
[4]	Aning sa ya ku í soko, ma aning swam yan zìnnwá.	/a.niŋ sa yæ ku í so.ko – ma a.niŋ sʷam jan zìn.nʷá/	Thank him and bless his name,
[5]	Shinn Luyí sàn hing, á zìm-à ku ri zìm yi níng, ma vinn fig á vinn bána.	/ʃĩ lu.jí sàn hɨŋ, á zɨ̀m à ku ɾi zìm ji nɨ́ŋ, ma vĩ fig á vĩ bǽ.næ/	for the Lord is good, and his gracious love stands forever.
[5]	Pìkyinn ǹsànwá shi sig hár kinn kinn.	/pɨ̀.kʲĩ ǹ.sàn.wá ʃi sɨg háɾ kĩ kĩ/	His faithfulness remains from generation to generation.
