= Tigon language =

Jukunoid language of Cameroon and Nigeria

Mbembe
- Tigon
- Native to: Cameroon, Nigeria
- Region: Northwest Region in Cameroon, Taraba State in Nigeria
- Native speakers: (60,000 cited 1987–2005)
- Language family: Niger–Congo?: Atlantic-Congo; Benue–Congo; Jukunoid; Central; Mbembe
- Dialects: Ashuku (Kitsipki); Nama (Dama, Namu); Nzare (Izale); Kporo; Eneeme

Language codes
- ISO 639-3: nza
- Glottolog: tigo1236

Mbembe, or more specifically Tigon Mbembe, is a Jukunoid language of Cameroon and Nigeria.

== Writing system ==
The alphabet is based on the General Alphabet of Cameroon Languages (GACL):

Upper case	A	Ɑ	B	Ch	D	E	Ɛ	F	G	Gb	H	I	J	K	Kp	L	M	N	Ny	Ŋ	O	Ɔ	P	R	S	Sh	T	U	V	W	Z	Zh
Lowercase	a	ɑ	b	ch	d	e	ɛ	f	g	gb	h	i	j	k	kp	l	m	n	ny	ŋ	o	ɔ	p	r	s	sh	t	u	v	w	z	zh

Tones are indicated by vowels with acutes, graves, circumflexes and carons.
