= Yukuben language =

Plateau language spoken in Nigeria

Yukuben
- Boritsu
- Uhumghikgi
- Native to: Nigeria, Cameroon
- Region: Taraba State
- Native speakers: (16,000 cited 1992)
- Language family: Niger–Congo?: Atlantic–Congo; Benue–Congo; Plateau; Yukubenic; Yukuben

Language codes
- ISO 639-3: ybl
- Glottolog: yuku1243
- ELP: Yukuben

Yukuben, also known as Fete or Uhumghikgi (Uhum), is a Plateau language of Nigeria. There are a thousand speakers across the border in Cameroon, where the name Uhumghikgi is preferred. It is a local trade language.

Its genetic classification is discussed in Prischnegg (2021).
