= Djiru =

Djiru may refer to:

- Djiru people, an ethnic group of Australia
- Djiru language, a dialect of the Dyirbal language of Australia
- Djiru, Queensland, a locality in Australia

== See also ==
- Jiru (disambiguation)
