= Fali of Baissa =

Endangered Benue–Congo language of Nigeria

Fali
- Fali of Baissa
- Native to: Nigeria
- Region: Taraba State
- Extinct: 2000s
- Language family: Niger–Congo?: Atlantic–Congo; Benue–Congo; ? (unclassified); Fali

Language codes
- ISO 639-3: fah
- Glottolog: bais1242
- ELP: Fali of Baissa

Fali is an unclassified Benue-Congo language of Nigeria, once spoken in the town of Baissa in Taraba State. The language is unwritten, and it went extinct in the 2000s.

== Genetic affiliation ==
Baissa Fali belongs to the Benue–Congo sub-family of the Niger–Congo languages. Its position within this family remains a matter of discussion.
