= Wãpha language =

Jukunoid language spoken in Nigeria

Wãpha
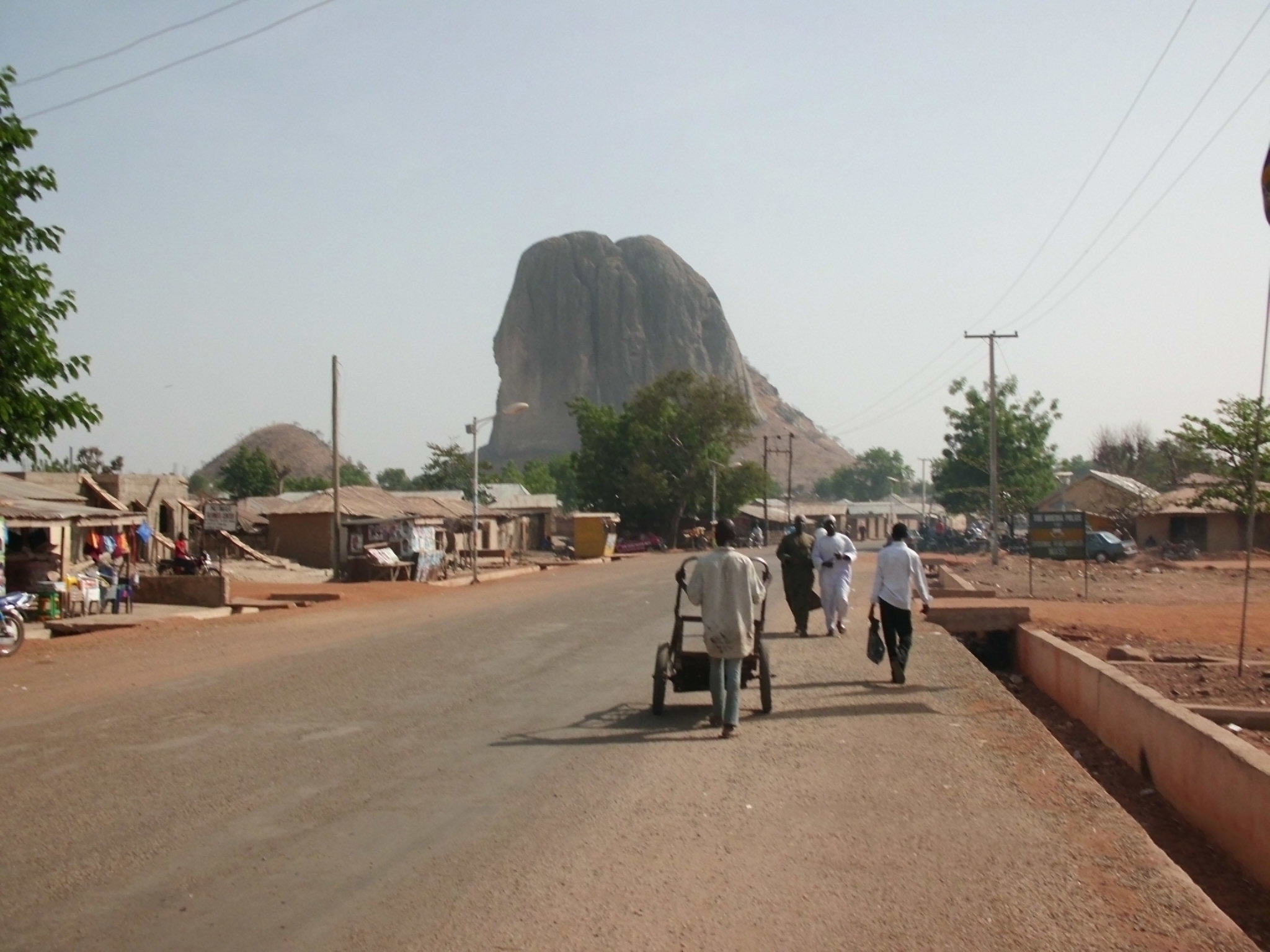
- Wase, Nigeria, where Jukun Wase is spoken
- Native to: Nigeria
- Region: Wase, Plateau State
- Native speakers: (1,600 cited 2000)
- Language family: Niger–Congo?: Atlantic–Congo; Benue–Congo; Jukunoid; Central; Jukun; Wãpha

Language codes
- ISO 639-3: juw
- Glottolog: waph1238
- ELP: Wãpha

Wãpha or Wase (Jukun Wase), after the district in which it is spoken, is a Jukunoid language of Nigeria.

== Phonology ==
Wãpha contains the following phonemes

=== Consonants ===
	Labial	Coronal	Palatal (alveolar)	Velar	Glottal
Nasal	m	n	(ɲ)	ŋ	
Stop	p, b, (ɓ)	t, d		k, g	
Affricate			t͡ʃ, d͡ʒ		
Sibilant	f, v	s, z	ʃ, ʒ		(h)
Spirant		(θ)	(ç)		
Rhotoric		r/ɾ			
Aproximant	w	l?	j		

1. Consonants in parentheses are marginal
2. /l/ is possibly marginal
3. /j, w/ indicate palatalization and labialization

=== Vowels ===
Oral vowels
Type	Front	Central	Back
Close	i	ɨ~ɯ	u
Near Close	ɪ		(ʊ)
Close Mid	e		o
Open Mid	ɛ	ɜ	ɔ
Open		a	

Lengthened vowels
Type	Front	Central	Back
Close	iː	ɨː~ɯː	u
Close Mid	eː		oː
Open Mid	ɛː	ɜː	ɔː
Open		aː	

Nasalized vowels
Type	Front	Central	Back
Close	ĩ	ɯ̃	ũ
Close Mid	ẽ		(õ)
Open		ã	
