= Tita language =

Benue–Congo language of Nigeria

Tita
- Native to: Nigeria
- Region: Taraba State
- Native speakers: (3,400 cited 2000)
- Language family: Niger–Congo?: Atlantic–Congo; Benue–Congo; ? (unclassified); Tita

Language codes
- ISO 639-3: tdq
- Glottolog: tita1240

Tita or "Hoai Petel" is an unclassified Benue–Congo language of Nigeria., it is mainly spoken in the states of Taraba and Plateau.

The Tita language has no existing dialects, and thus no alternate dialect names. There is only one recorded people groups speaking it as a primary language.

In the year 2000 the number of native speakers was recorded at 3,400, however some sources put the number higher at 6,600 (likely a recent estimate), which could be the case due to the population boom in Africa, and especially in countries like Nigeria.
