= Wase River =

River in Nigeria

Coordinates: 8°27′N 10°06′E

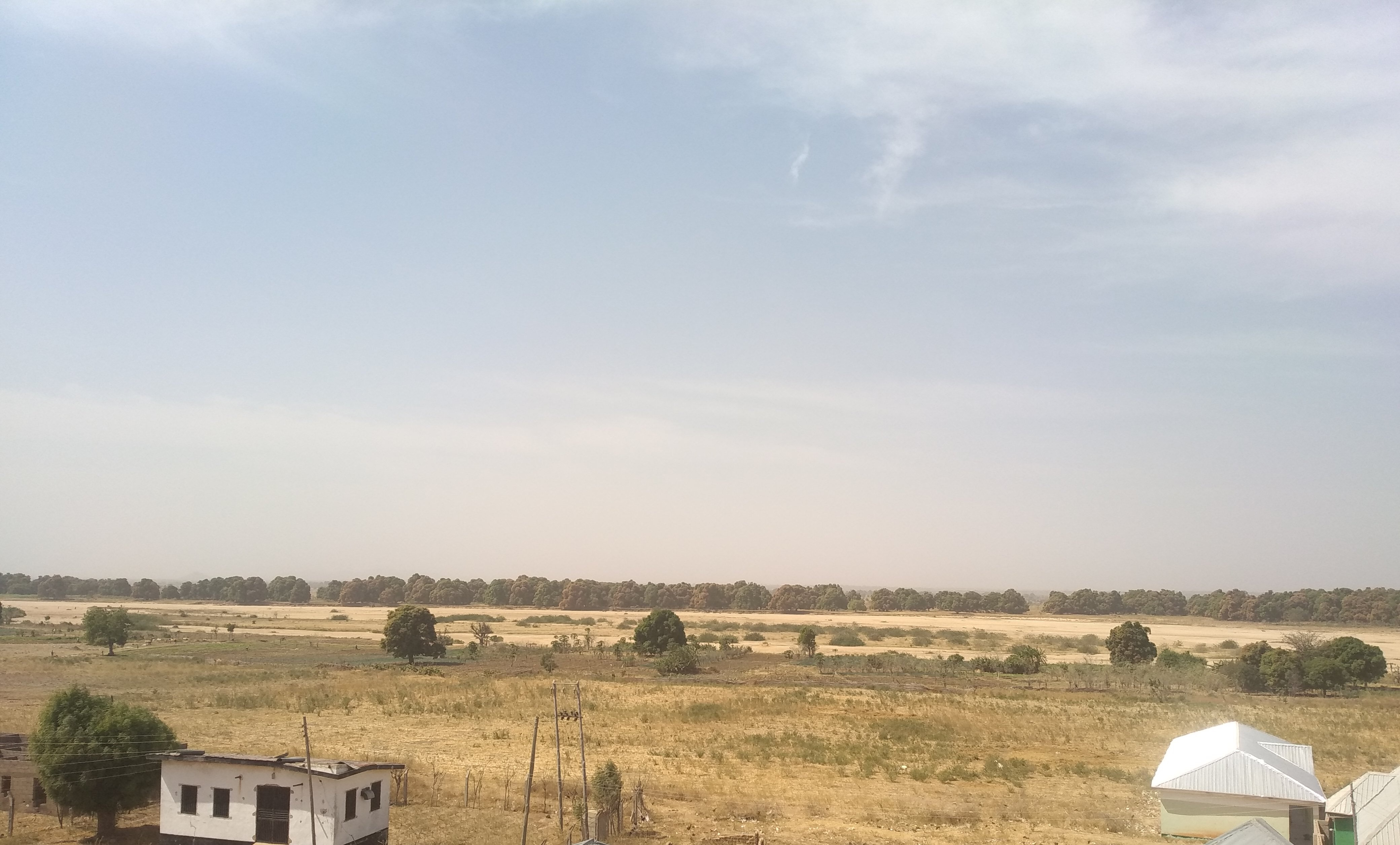
- Wase River in Wase, Nigeria
- Native name: Bululluga (Hausa)

Location
- Country: Nigeria
- Local Government: Wase, Nigeria

Physical characteristics
- Source: Gumshar of Kanam, Nigeria
  - location: Kanam, Nigeria
- Mouth: River Benue
  - location: Dampar of, Ibi, Nigeria
- Length: 132 km (82 mi)

Basin features
- Tributaries
  - left: River Benue

The Wase River is a river in Wase LGA, Plateau State, Nigeria. It is linked with River Benue in Dampar of Ibi Local Government, Maize, yams, mangoes and other farm vegetables are grown on its banks.
