= Jiru language =

Jukunoid language of Nigeria

Jiru
- Native to: Nigeria
- Region: Taraba State
- Native speakers: (3,400 cited 2000)
- Language family: Niger–Congo?: Atlantic–Congo; Benue–Congo; Jukunoid; Central; Wurbo; Jiru

Language codes
- ISO 639-3: jrr
- Glottolog: jiru1238

Jiru is a Jukunoid language of Nigeria.
