= Jogi language =

Indo-European language spoken in Pakistan

Jogi
- Native to: Pakistan, India
- Region: Sindh, Gujarat
- Ethnicity: Jogis
- Native speakers: (50–100,000 in Pakistan cited 1996)
- Language family: Indo-European: Indo-Iranian; Indo-Aryan; Western; Rajasthani; Marwari; Jogi

Language codes
- ISO 639-3: jog
- Glottolog: jogi1234

Jogi is an Indo-Aryan language spoken by at least some of the caste of Jogis of India and Pakistan. The language is generally considered a dialect of Marwari, but the pronouns are distinct. Many Hindu as well as Muslim Jogi's of Sindh speak Jogi language as their native including Sindhi as well; whereas Jogi in other parts of Pakistan speak mostly Jogi language. However, the Jogi living in Thari Mirwah Sindh are a sub-caste of the Rajpar tribe, whose native language is Sindhi, and do not speak Jogi.
