= Wase Rock =

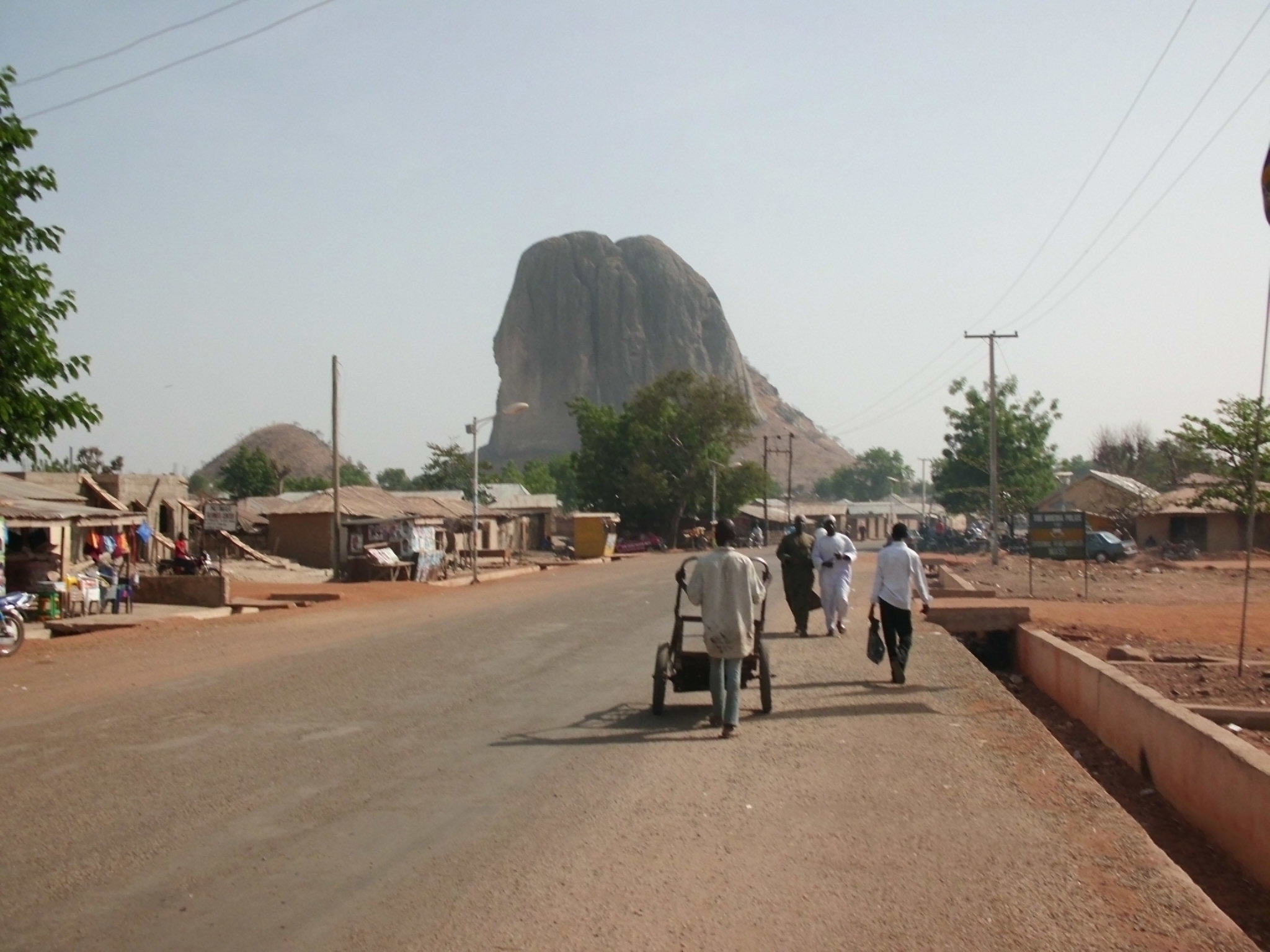
- The Wase Rock, as viewed from the area around the police station in Wase town

Highest point
- Elevation: 543 m (1,781 ft)Above (the mean) sea level
- Coordinates: 9°04′35.00″N 9°57′30.00″E

Geography
- Location within Nigeria
- Location: Wase, Nigeria
- Country: Nigeria
- State: Plateau
- Range coordinates: 9°04′30.00″N 9°57′42.00″E;9°04′34.00″N 9°57′20.00″E

Wase Rock (Hausa: Gwauron Dutse) is a massive dome shaped rocky inselberg found near Wase town in Wase Local Government Area of Plateau State in central Nigeria. Standing alone in the Wase plain, it achieves a remarkable height of about 298 metres (978 ft) above the surface of the neighbouring surroundings and 543 metres (1,781 ft) above sea level.

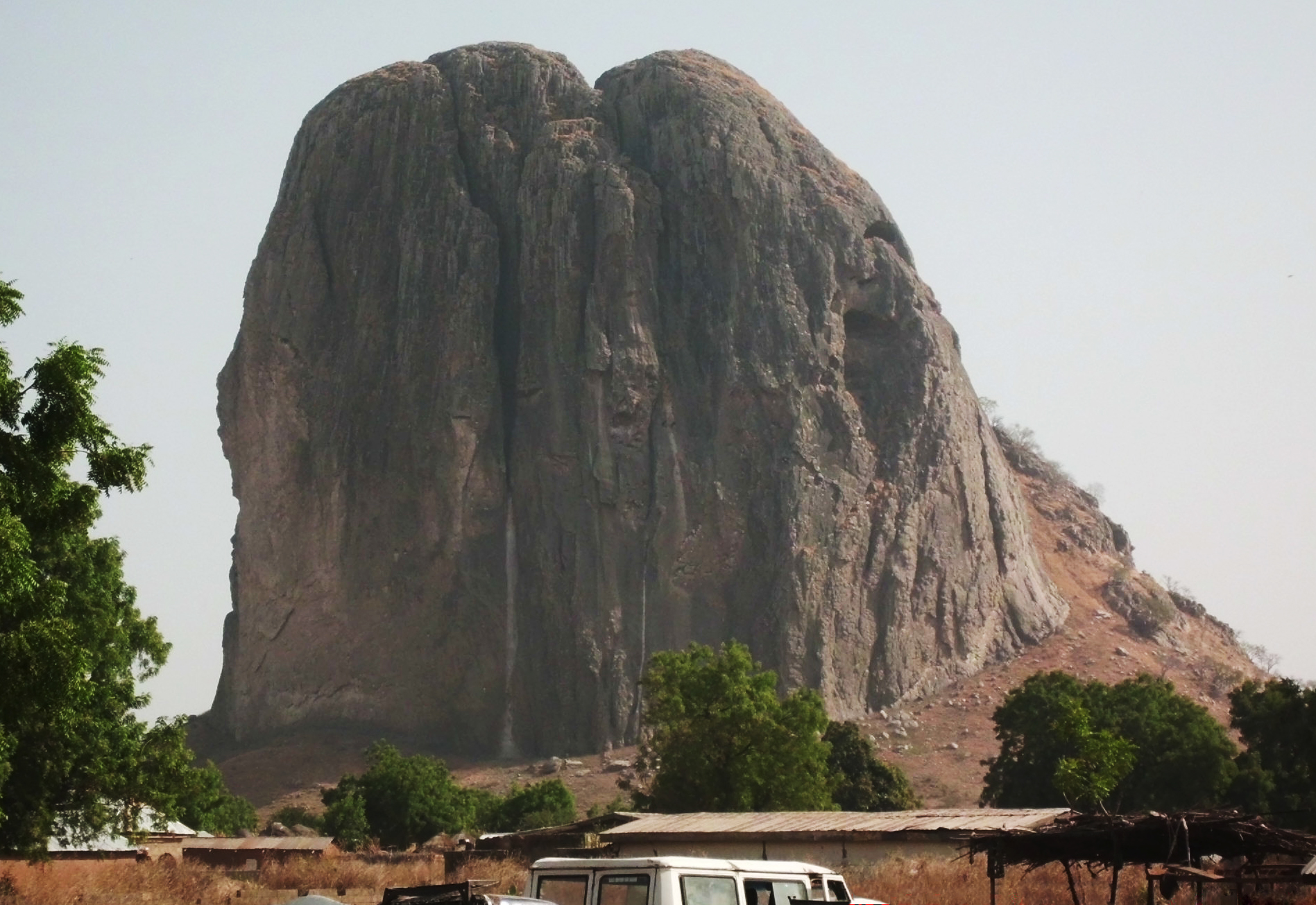
A view of the Wase rock in Wase

== History ==
Wase Rock is a trachyte neck rising 295 metres (968 ft) from the floor of the Benue Rift, 160 km SE of Jos. It is all that remains of a once giant volcano. The rock, with its vertical sides, has its summit split into two by a narrow chasm and the base is surrounded by talus slopes (scree)

== Appearance ==
It has been described as a volcanic plug by geographers. It is visible for a radius of 40 kilometres (25 mi) due to its height. It is one of the only five breeding places for the Rossy white pelican birds in Africa. The government now protects about 321 hectares (790 acres) of land around the rock as a bird sanctuary and for wildlife development.
