= Wannu language =

Jukunoid language spoken in Nigeria

Wannu
- Native to: Nigeria
- Region: Benue State
- Native speakers: (a few thousand cited 1998)
- Language family: Niger–Congo?: Atlantic–Congo; Benue–Congo; Jukunoid; Central; Kororofa; Wannu

Language codes
- ISO 639-3: jub
- Glottolog: wann1241

Wannu, or Abinsi after the district in which it is spoken, is a Jukunoid language of Nigeria. It belongs to the Jukun Wapan (Kororofa) language cluster.
