= Ka River =

River in Nigeria

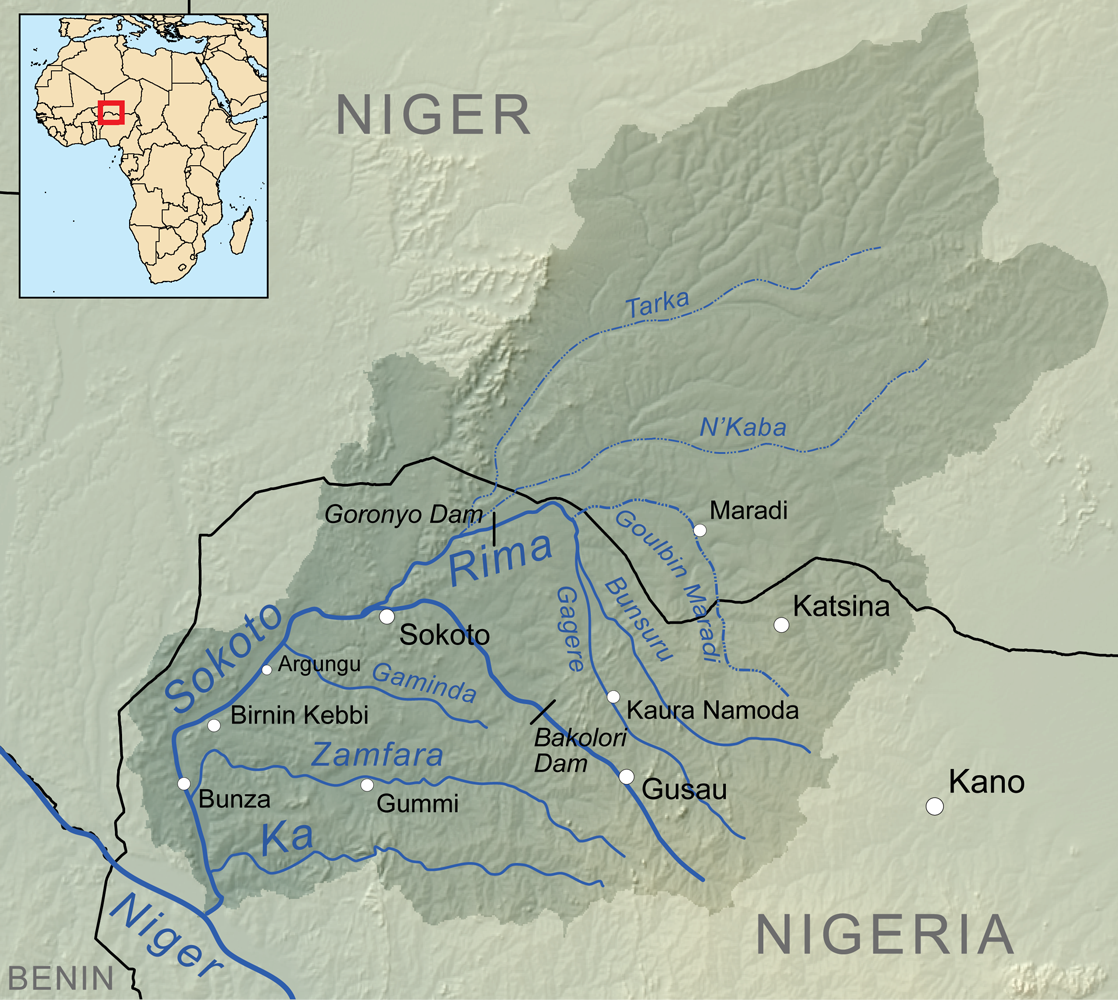
Sokoto river basin, Ka river to the south

Ka River (also known as Gulbin Ka River) is a river in the northern part of Nigeria. Originating in Zamfara State, it runs some 250 kilometres (160 mi) west into Kebbi State where it joins with the Sokoto River about 100 kilometres (62 mi) south of Birnin Kebbi, shortly before joining the Niger River. River Ka is a section of a stream in Nigeria. River Ka is situated nearby to the villages Nasarawa and Tunga Lombo. Additionally, River Ka serves as a traditional boundary that separates Benue-Congo group languages of Zuru Emirate from the Afro-Asiac group of Gummi and Bukkuyun to far north,. Some of the ancient communities of River Ka are Waje, Kyabu, Danko and Warri districts in Zuru Emirate of Kebbi State..

== Climate/Geography ==
River Gulbin Ka is a stream with the region font code of Africa/Middle East. Its climate coordinates are 11°39'0" N and 4°10'60" E in DMS or 11.65 and 4.18333. Its UTM position is FN28 and its Joint Operation Graphics reference is NC31-03.
