= Jiba language =

Jukunoid language spoken in Nigeria

Jiba
- Kona
- Jukun Wurkum
- Native to: Nigeria
- Region: Northeastern Taraba State and western Adamawa State
- Ethnicity: Bajibaro
- Native speakers: (2,000 cited 1977)
- Language family: Niger–Congo?: Atlantic–Congo; Benue–Congo; Jukunoid; Central; Kororofa; Jiba

Language codes
- ISO 639-3: juo
- Glottolog: jiba1237
- ELP: Jiba

The Jiba language (also known as Kona, Jukun) is spoken by about 2,000 people. In 2026, the Jiba language was considered an endangered indigenous Jukunoid language of Nigeria spoken in Bauchi, plateau and Taraba states. The Jiba language is classified as a Niger-Congo language.
