= Kuteb language =

Language of Nigeria and Cameroon

Kuteb
- Native to: Nigeria, Cameroon
- Region: Taraba State
- Ethnicity: Kuteb people
- Native speakers: (46,000 cited 2000)
- Language family: Niger–Congo?: Atlantic–Congo; Benue–Congo; Kuteb–Kapya; Kuteb

Language codes
- ISO 639-3: kub
- Glottolog: kute1248
- ELP: Kuteb

Kuteb (also known as Kutep, Ati, Kutev, Mbarike) is a Benue–Congo language. The Kuteb people mostly live in the southern part of Taraba State in Nigeria, with a thousand-or-so speakers across the border in Cameroon. In Nigeria, it is spoken mostly in Takum and Ussa LGAs, and Yangtu SDA, Taraba State.

== Classification ==
Together, Kuteb and Kapya form an independent branch of the Benue–Congo languages according to Roger Blench (2026).

== Phonology ==
In Kuteb, there are 27 consonant phonemes, 12 vowels, and five tones.

=== Vowels ===
In Kuteb, there are two different sets of vowels, oral, and nasal. Phonemically, each set has six different vowels. In total, there are 12 separate phonemes. The status of ɨ being a phoneme in Kuteb is uncertain. This phoneme only occurs in closed syllables, some noun prefixes, and in verbal reduplication where there is neutralization of u and i.

Table of vowel phonemes in Kuteb
	Oral Vowels			Nasal Vowels		
	Front	Central	Back	Front	Central	Back
Close	i /i/	ɨ /ɨ/	u /u/	ĩ /ĩ/		ũ /ũ/
Close Mid	e /e/		o /o/	ē /ẽ/		ō /õ/
Near Open	ae /æ/			ãe /æ̃/		
Open		a /a/			ã /ã/	

=== Consonants ===
Kuteb has 27 different consonant phonemes. The parenthesized entries are allophones. The italicized entries are found in common loan words, or, in the case of /v/ and /z/, subdialectical variation. Like most Jukunoid languages, Kuteb has velarized consonants. In one study, these are included not as modifications on the base-phoneme, but as their own separate sound.

Table of consonant phonemes in Kuteb
		Labial	Alveolar	Palatal	Velar	Glottal
Nasal		m /m/	n, nn (Note: In the standard Kuteb orthography, ⟨n⟩ is used initially and medially for /n/, while ⟨nn⟩ is used finally) /n/	ny /ɲ/	ŋ /ŋ/	
Plosive	unvoiced	p /p/	t /t/		k /k/	
Plosive	voiced	b /b/	d /d/		g /g/	
Plosive	pre-nasal voiced	mb /m͡b/	nd /n͡d/		ŋg /ŋ͡g/	
Affricate	unvoiced		ts /t͡s/	c /t͡ʃ/		
Affricate	voiced			j /d͡ʒ/		
Affricate	pre-nasal voiced		nz /nd͡z/	nj /nd͡ʒ/		
Fricative	unvoiced	f /f/	s /s/	sh /ʃ/		h /h/
Fricative	voiced	v /v/	z /z/	(j [ʒ])		
Fricative	pre-nasal voiced		(nz [n͡z])	(nj [n͡ʒ])		
Approximant				y /j/	w /w/	
Flap			r /ɾ/			
Lateral-Approximant			l /l/			

=== Tones ===
In Kuteb, there are either four or five different tones, depending on how they are counted. The tones that are accepted by multiple studies are the low (unmarked), mid (¯), high (´), and falling (ˆ) tones.

==== Arguments ====
According to Roger Blench, there are five different tones in Kuteb, these are: low (unmarked), mid (¯), high (´), falling (ˆ), and rising (ˇ). The fifth tone, (rising) is only created through sandhi changes that affect some vocabulary after an "upstep". According to W.E. Welmers, this sandhi change does not occur, and if it did, only the pronunciation would change, not the written diacritic as well.

=== Phonotactics ===
==== Syllabic boundaries ====
In Kutep, like in other Jukunoid languages, most consonantal phonemes can either be labialized or palatal. If these changes are taken to be consonantal phonemic clusters, the syllabic boundaries are as follows:

N - syllabic nasal, V - vowel, C - consonant
	Kuteb (divided syllabically)	Kuteb	English translation
N	ḿ.m	ḿm	no
V	u.fu	ufu	door
CV	bá	bá	come
CVC	mūm	mūm	dig
CCV	u.kwe	ukwe	chief
CCVC	kwáb	kwáb	try

==== Sandhi changes ====
The letter ⟨w⟩ in the Kuteb language retains its status as a voiced labio-velar approximant, as in uwé ‘face’ or in wōm ‘dry’ - though, when ⟨w⟩ is included in clusters with a palatal consonant (/c, j, sh, nj/) /w/, due to sandhi changes, becomes a voiced or voiceless labiodental release.

==== Distribution of consonants ====
In Kuteb, there are many consonant clusters that can exist, though, most of these occur between word boundaries, though, some of these do occur in single-syllable isolation - these syllables are listed below. Theoretically though, any combination of syllable-final consonants (see below) followed by any syllable-initial consonant is possible. It is likely, however, that reduction would occur, as in the word ushitong ‘soup-stirrer’ (from shir and utoŋ) in which the /r/ has been dropped. Also, when final ⟨nn⟩ stems precede stems beginning with ⟨n⟩, the double ⟨nn⟩+⟨n⟩ is reduced to just ⟨n⟩. This effect can be shown in words such as munae (munn-náe) ‘be abundant’, and in munji (munn-nji) ‘forget’.

In CV positions, the following consonants are used:

- p ts t c k b (d) (g) mb nd nj ŋg f s sh h v z nz m n ŋ r l

While in C(C)VC final positions, the following are used instead:

- b r g m n* ŋ*

And the following are used in CC clusters:

- With Cw: pw, mbw, bw, fw, mw, sw (?), cw, njw, jw, shw, kw, ngw, and ŋw (Note: Roger Blench notes that ⟨ŋ⟩ and ⟨ng⟩ are equivalent in the standard orthography. Here, both ⟨ŋw⟩ and ⟨ngw⟩ are listed as separate phonemes, though, the difference between them is not given)
- With Cy: py, mby
- With Ck: pk, tk, fk, sk
- With Cg: mbg, ndg

==== Consonant clusters ====
In 1964, Peter Ladefoged recorded the phonetics of multiple West African languages. One of these languages was Kuteb, and these were his findings:

Labial			Dental	Alveolar	Palatal	Post-palatal	Velar
With /w/	With /y/	With /ɣ/ or /x/	Dental	Alveolar	Palatal	Post-palatal	Velar
pw	py	px	ts	tx	tʃ	tɕf	kw
mbw	mby	mbɣ	ndz	ndɣ	ndʒ	ndʑv	ŋgw
bw	by	bɣ			dʒ	dʑv	(gw)
fw	fy	fx		sk		ʃf	
mw	my	(mɣ)			nay		ŋw

== See also ==
- Tyap language
