= Wapan language =

Jukunoid language of Nigeria, also called Wukari or Kororofa

Wapan
- Jukun
- Native to: Nigeria
- Region: Taraba State, Plateau State, Nasarawa State
- Native speakers: (100,000 cited 1994)
- Language family: Niger–Congo?: Atlantic–Congo languages; Benue–Congo; Jukunoid; Central; Kororofa; Wapan
- Dialects: Wukan
- Writing system: Latin

Language codes
- ISO 639-3: juk
- Glottolog: wapa1235
- ELP: Wapan

Wapan (Jukun Wapan) or Kororofa, also known as Wukari after the local town of Wukari, is a major Jukunoid language of Nigeria.

== Varieties ==
Blench (2019) lists the following varieties as part of the Kororofa (Jukun Wapan) cluster:

- Abinsi
- Wapan proper
- Hõne
- Dampar (spoken at Dampar, Wukari LGA)

== Phonology ==
=== Consonants ===
		Labial			Alveolar			Palatal	Velar			Labio- velar	Glottal		
		plain	pal.	lab.	plain	pal.	lab.	Palatal	plain	pal.	lab.	Labio- velar	plain	pal.	lab.
Nasal		m	mʲ		n				ŋ						
Plosive	voiceless	p	pʲ	pʷ	t	tʲ			k	kʲ	kʷ	k͡p			
Plosive	voiced	b	bʲ	bʷ	d	dʲ			ɡ	ɡʲ		ɡ͡b			
Plosive	prenasal	ᵐb	ᵐbʲ		ⁿd	ⁿdʲ			ᵑɡ	ᵑɡʲ					
Affricate	voiceless				t͡s		t͡sʷ								
Affricate	voiced				d͡z		d͡zʷ								
Fricative	voiceless	f	fʲ		s	sʲ	sʷ						h	hʲ	hʷ
Fricative	voiced	v	vʲ		z	zʲ									
Trill					r										
Approximant								j				w			

=== Vowels ===
	Front	Central	Back
High	i ĩ		u ũ
Mid	e ẽ		o õ
Low		a ã	

- Vowels are also typically always pronounced as nasalized when after nasal consonants.

=== Nasal consonants ===
Wapan and other Jukunoid languages are interesting in the development of asymmetrical patterns of nasal and oral consonants in West Africa.

One could posit that voiced oral stops become nasal before nasal vowels, sometimes at the expense of having more nasal than oral vowels, which is typologically odd, or that nasal stops denasalise before oral vowels, which is typologically odd as well.

Oral vowels are allowed only in syllables like ba, mba, nasal vowels in bã, mã.

Historically, however, the consonants nasalized: *mb became **mm before nasal vowels and then reduced to *m, leaving the current asymmetric distribution.

allophonic Ṽ next to N	*mã	*mãm	*mba	*mbãm	*ba	*bãm
*mb → *mm/_Ṽ	*mã	*mãm	*mba	*mmãm	*ba	*bãm
*mm → *m	*mã	*mãm	*mba	*mãm	*ba	*bãm
loss of final C	mã	mã	mba	mã	ba	bã
