= Sokoto River =

River in Nigeria

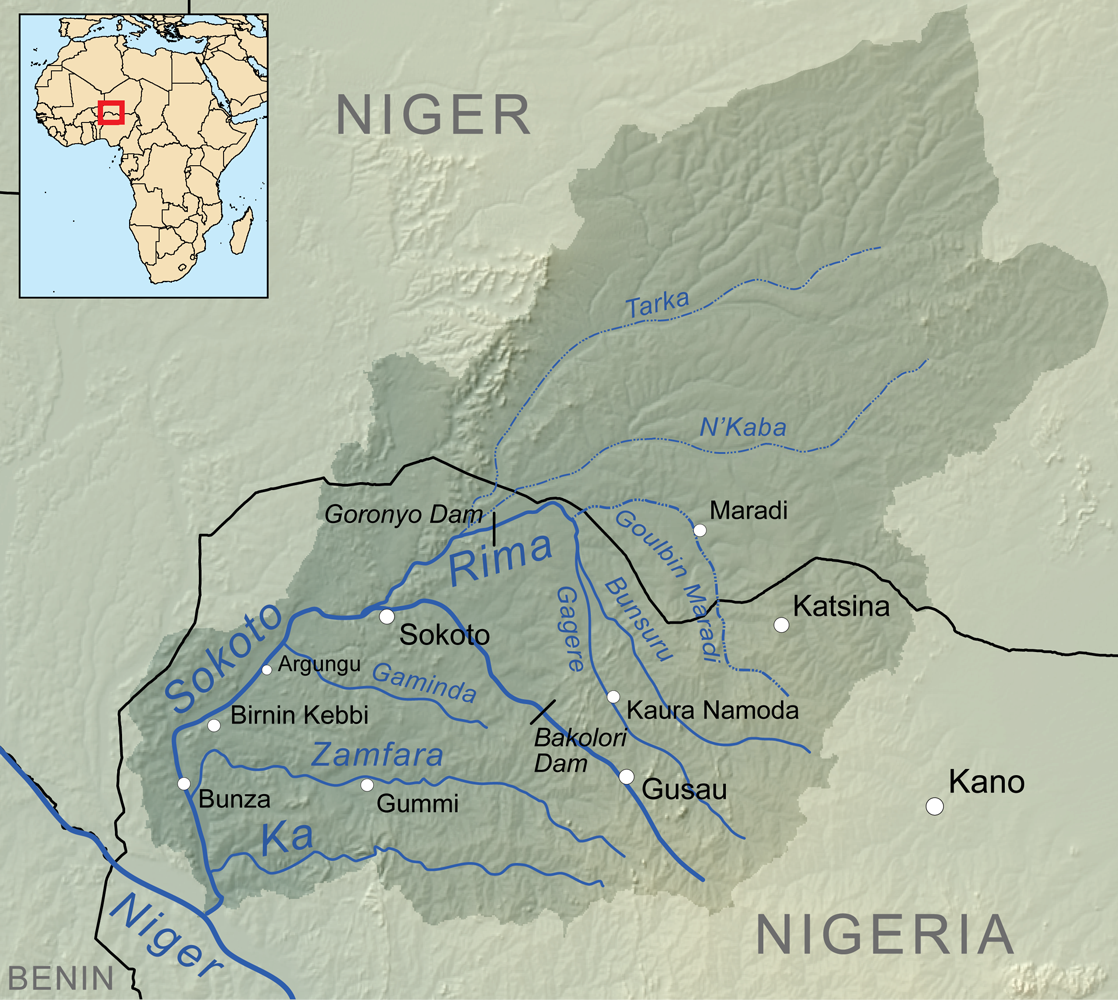
Map of the Sokoto River drainage basin

The Sokoto River, (formerly known as Gulbi 'n Kebbi), is a river in north-west Nigeria and a tributary of the River Niger. The river's source is near Funtua in the south of Katsina State, some 275 kilometres (171 mi) in a straight line from Sokoto. It flows north-west passing Gusau in Zamfara State, where the Gusau Dam forms a reservoir that supplies the city with water. Further downstream the river enters Sokoto State where it passes by Sokoto and is joined by the Rima River, then turning south and flowing through Birnin Kebbi in Kebbi State. About 120 kilometres (75 mi) south of Birnin Kebbi, it reaches its confluence with the Niger River.

The plains around the river are widely cultivated and the river used as a source of irrigation. The river is also an important means of transport. The Bakolori Dam, about 100 kilometres (62 mi) upstream from Sokoto, is a major reservoir on the Sokoto River. It has had significant impact on downstream floodplain cultivation.

== Pollution ==
Toxic chemicals and biological agents that are present in groundwater in excess of what is normally present in the water are referred to as "water pollution" and could be hazardous to the environment and/or human health. Chemicals that have been added to water bodies as a result of other human activities can also be considered a form of water pollution. No matter how much harm they may do to the environment and human health, any amount of toxic substances pollutes the water.

== Climate ==
One of the hottest cities in Nigeria is Sokoto, with average temperature of 28.3 °C (82.9 °F), the daytime temperatures are most of the year generally under 40 °C (104.0 °F), the months that are slightly warm are February to April where the temperature is under 40 °C (104.0 °F).

== Sites suitable for water storage in Sokoto Basin ==
In this review, destinations reasonable for area of water stockpiling structures were depicted in the Sokoto-Rima bowl by joining eight variables considered significant in appropriateness examination for water capacity structures. The elements considered are land use/cover, soil, geography, slant, waste thickness, lineament thickness, distance to seepage and precipitation. The elements were characterized with each class allocated inclination esteem in view of experiences from past examinations and information on the review region. The elements were coordinated through weighted overlay investigation utilizing variables' loads registered from Logical Order Interaction. The consequence of the reasonableness investigation showed that 3% (131.89 km2) area of Sokoto-Rima bowl is viewed as exceptionally appropriate, 9% (486.19 km2) of the bowl region is modestly appropriate, 11% (596.05 km2) of the bowl region have low steadiness for siting water capacity structures while 77% (3967.62 km2) of the bowl isn't appropriate. Further mix of appropriateness layer, seepage organization, cross-segment diagram produced from computerized height model and located Unpredictable Organization (TIN) empower determination of six expected locales for which boundaries, for example, base rise, outlet height, surface region, stockpiling limit and flood degree were figured.

Changing example of precipitation arising all over the planet show that environmental change is as of now a reality (Dore, 2005). Expanded warming causes higher vanishing, thus more surface drying, which builds span and force of dry season (Kevin, 2005). The water-holding limit of air anyway increments by roughly 7% per 1 °C warming, which causes expanded water fume in the environment, and this gives the best impact on precipitation. Any upset condition of the air, particularly as influencing the world's surface, provided by expanded dampness, produce more extreme precipitation occasions which are currently normal event, even in districts where all out precipitation is diminishing. This has led to increments flood risk. This changing precipitation design have been in numerous areas, with expanded dryness in dry regions (by and large all through the subtropics) and wet regions becoming wetter, especially in mid to high scopes (Kevin, 2005)

In Nigeria, environmental change is having an overflow of immediate and roundabout effects on water assets. These incorporate dry spell, desertification evaporating of water bodies and glimmer flood in the northern piece of the country, while the southern part have been engaging the issue of ocean level ascents, salt water interruption, overwhelmed landscape coming about unfortunate water quality in surface and the subsurface (Akujieze et al., 2003, Bello, 1998, Danladi et al., 2017). Intensified climatic impacts have definitely impacted the environments and networks, going from social and financial effects on food weakness and wellbeing challenges, proof of which can be tracked down in North Nigeria (Urama and Ozor, 2010).

The Sudano-Sahelian district of Nigeria have a persistent history of expanding dryness and have encountered expanded frequency of dry season complemented by environmental change (James, 1973, Mortimore, 1973, Ola-Adams and Okali, 2006, Olofin, 1985). The circumstance in the Sudano-Sahelian locale of Nigeria is that of a consistent progression of the Sahara desert and expanding desertification making huge breadth of beforehand suitable brushing and arable land become inaccessible and useless (Ajaero et al., 2015). Events of dry spell in northern Nigeria has been credited basically to the disappointment of the downpour bearing rainstorm twists from the Atlantic Sea to enter adequately enough into the area. Desertification on the other, have been connected to various variables which incorporate state of being of soils, disturbance of biological framework brought about by unfortunate land use, vegetation, geography, natural climatic impulses, and ceaseless expansion sought after being made upon the accessible land assets for farming necessities to satisfy the developing need for food (Oladipo, 1993).

Northwestern piece of Nigeria has seen wonderful extension, development and formative exercises like structures, street developments, cultivating, and deforestation alongside other anthropogenic exercises related with enormous expansion in populace. This has brought about expanded interest for water for rural, modern and metropolitan necessities. Deficiency of adequate water to provide food for these necessities generally makes the test water shortage especially during the dry season. Inaccessibility of water for utilization and rural reason typically lead to episode and spread of sicknesses and food lack, for example, loose bowels and cholera prompting the degeneration personal satisfaction in the area.

Admittance to safe water supply inside Sokoto-Rima bowl has incredible impact on the wellbeing, monetary efficiency and personal satisfaction of individuals. Addressing this need is the serious issue confronting the local area. More than 70% of families locally don't approach further developed water supply (Salih and Al-Tarif, 2012). They exclusively depend on free source, for example, downpour, enduring streams, lakes and unprotected wells, which makes them defenseless against water borne sicknesses like typhoid fever, cholera and loose bowels. With the bigger extent of the populaces participated in cultivating, settlement are general little and are dissipated over huge region, making pipe borne water supply troublesome (Ishaku et al., 2011). Intercessions by the public authority to mitigate the test of water shortage include the arrangement of wells and boreholes. Tragically, investigation for groundwater is very difficult around here. The rough geography and high help comprise a significant hydrogeological challenge bringing about high pace of well disappointment, while some of useful wells yield no or little water during the dry season which wouldn't uphold the populace, prompting water emergency and deficiencies (Akujieze et al., 2003). This present circumstance adjusts cultivating and powers families particularly the ladies and kids to invest more energy strolling longer distances during the dry season to jog water for homegrown purposes. The powerlessness of momentum water supply plot satisfy the rising need requires the thought of creative choices with short and long haul benefits. It is central to investigate possibilities of adjusting current and expanding impulses in. Water reaping utilizing capacity structures addresses one of the promptly versatile arrangements, as limited scale repositories have been found to assume critical parts in adaption to environment changeability, while expanding family pay in sub-Saharan Africa precipitation (Cofie and Amede, 2015).

The review region for this study is the Sokoto-Rima Stream bowl (Fig. 1) with an all out area of 126,174 km2. It covers four states in the northwestern Nigeria and subsequently exists in the semi-parched area or Sudano-Sahelian locale which as per IPCC (2007) is profoundly helpless against environmental change. The region is basically covered with light timberland, meadow, and hindered trees. The environment is predominantly constrained by two air masses which decide the two prevailing seasons, which are the dry and wet season. The air masses are Tropical Oceanic and Tropical Mainland, blowing from the Atlantic and the Sahara Desert separately. The region encounters a delayed dry season frequently overwhelmed by dusty harmattan twists from October to April. The best food uncertainty concerns exist in outrageous northern Nigeria which incorporate the Sokoto-Rima Stream bowl. As per US Office for Worldwide Turn of events (USIAD) (2012), the locale is among the areas named "pushed" under the 2012 assessed food security conditions in Nigeria and will have serious ramifications sooner rather than later. Relative dampness is generally low (40%) for the significant piece of the year except for the wet season when it ascends to a normal of 80%. This fundamental justification behind the blistering and dry weather conditions experienced in the northern locale, which is in sharp difference to a sweltering and damp weather conditions experienced in the southern pieces of Nigeria (Kowal and Knabe, 1972). The review region reaches out between scopes 10°N and 14° N and longitudes 3°E and 9°E. The waste framework is overwhelmed by Waterway Rima framework with significant feeders like Gawon, Zamfara and Gubinka. These feeders ascend in the Storm cellar Complex area of Sokoto State and stream toward the west to join the Waterway Rima. Nonetheless, in the southern piece of the bowl, there are other less significant streams, for example, Danzaki, Pop and Kasanu, all of which stream to join the Waterway Rima (Ojo, 2014). Sokoto Rima bowl can be sorted into three morphological units, viz. the uplands overwhelmed by took apart translucent rocks with slope ranges and domical rises (inselbergs) happening in the south and southeast, the fields happening in the north and focus, and the riverine marsh of the Niger and lower Rima valleys happening in the west (Swindell, 1986).

Horticulture through water system is broadly polished and crops developed incorporate grains, cotton, groundnuts, tuber harvests and sugar stick. Water is vital to headway of maintainable horticultural in this sort of district, as it straightforwardly influences a few parts of supportability, for example, monetary, wellbeing, ecological and social perspectives (WWAP, 2015). The rising interest in food requires execution and strengthening of practical of agribusiness programs, which pivots extraordinarily on the accessibility of water. Water gathering and stockpiling designs, for example, lakes, dams and little supplies could subsequently offer a portion of the water expected to drive manageable horticulture in the Sokoto-Rima bowl. Furthermore, these designs can be utilized to relieve the event of glimmer floods (Saher et al., 2013) related with short yet extreme focus precipitation which trademark in the Sokoto-Rima bowl by controlling how much water streaming downstream after weighty downpour (Ola-Adams and Okali, 2006), and at a similar increment groundwater re-energize because of maintenance of water for longer periods.

== General hydrology of Sokoto Basin ==
The Sokoto Bowl of northwestern Nigeria lies in the sub-Saharan Sudan belt of west Africa in a zone of savannah-type vegetation. Precipitation, averaging around 30 inches or 760 millimetres yearly in a significant part of the bowl, happens essentially in a wet season which endures from May to October. A delayed dry season reaching out from October to April is overwhelmed by dusty harmattan twists from the upper east. April and May are the most sizzling months, when temperatures every so often reach 105 °F or 40.6 °C. Stream in surges of the Sokoto Bowl is for the most part overland spillover. Just in a couple of compasses, took care of by ground-water release from the sedimentary rocks, are streams enduring. In the Stream Zamfara bowl, ground-water release contributes just about 1 inch or 2.5 centimetres of the normal 3.33 inches or 8.5 centimetres crawls of complete yearly overflow. Nearby Sokoto, the Stream Rima streams all through the year supported by spring release from roosted ground water in limestone of the Kalambaina Arrangement. On the translucent rock formation where the vast majority of the streams rise, all out yearly spillover might surpass 5 inches or 12.7 centimetres, very little of which is ground-water release. The sedimentary rocks of the bowl range in age from Cretaceous to Tertiary and are made for the most part out of interbedded sand, mud, and some limestone; the beds plunge tenderly toward the northwest. Alluvium of Quaternary age underlies the swamps of the Stream Sokoto (presently Sokoto) and its primary feeders. These stones contain three significant artesian springs, notwithstanding provincial unconfined ground-water bodies in all the head outcrop regions, and a roosted water body in the outcrop of the Kalambaina Development. Artesian springs happen at profundity in the Gundumi Arrangement, the Rima Gathering, and the Gwandu Development and are isolated from each other by mud beds in the lower some portion of the Rima Gathering and the Dange Arrangement. In outcrop, earth in the Dange Arrangement additionally upholds the roosted water of the Kalambaina Development. The Gundumi Development, laying on the storm cellar complex, is made out of varicolored earth, sand, and rock.
