= Jukun Takum language =

Jukunoid language of Cameroon and Nigeria

Jukun
- Jukun Takum
- Njikun
- Native to: Cameroon, Nigeria
- Native speakers: (L1: 2,400 cited 2000); L2: 40,000 (1979)
- Language family: Niger–Congo?: Atlantic–Congo languages; Volta–Congo languages; Benue–Congo; Jukunoid; Central; Jukun languages; Jukun

Language codes
- ISO 639-3: jbu
- Glottolog: juku1254

Jukun (Njikun) or more precisely Jukun Takum, is a Jukunoid language of Cameroon used as a trade language in Nigeria. Though there are only a few thousand native speakers and only a dozen in Nigeria (as of 2000), it is spoken as a second language in Nigeria by tens of thousands (40,000 reported in 1979).

The name Jukun is a cover term for several related Jukunoid languages such as the much more numerous Jukun Wapan.

Wase Tofa is listed by Blench (2019) as a dialect.
