= Wase, Nigeria =

Wase Gari Mai Dutse Dutse
- LGA and town
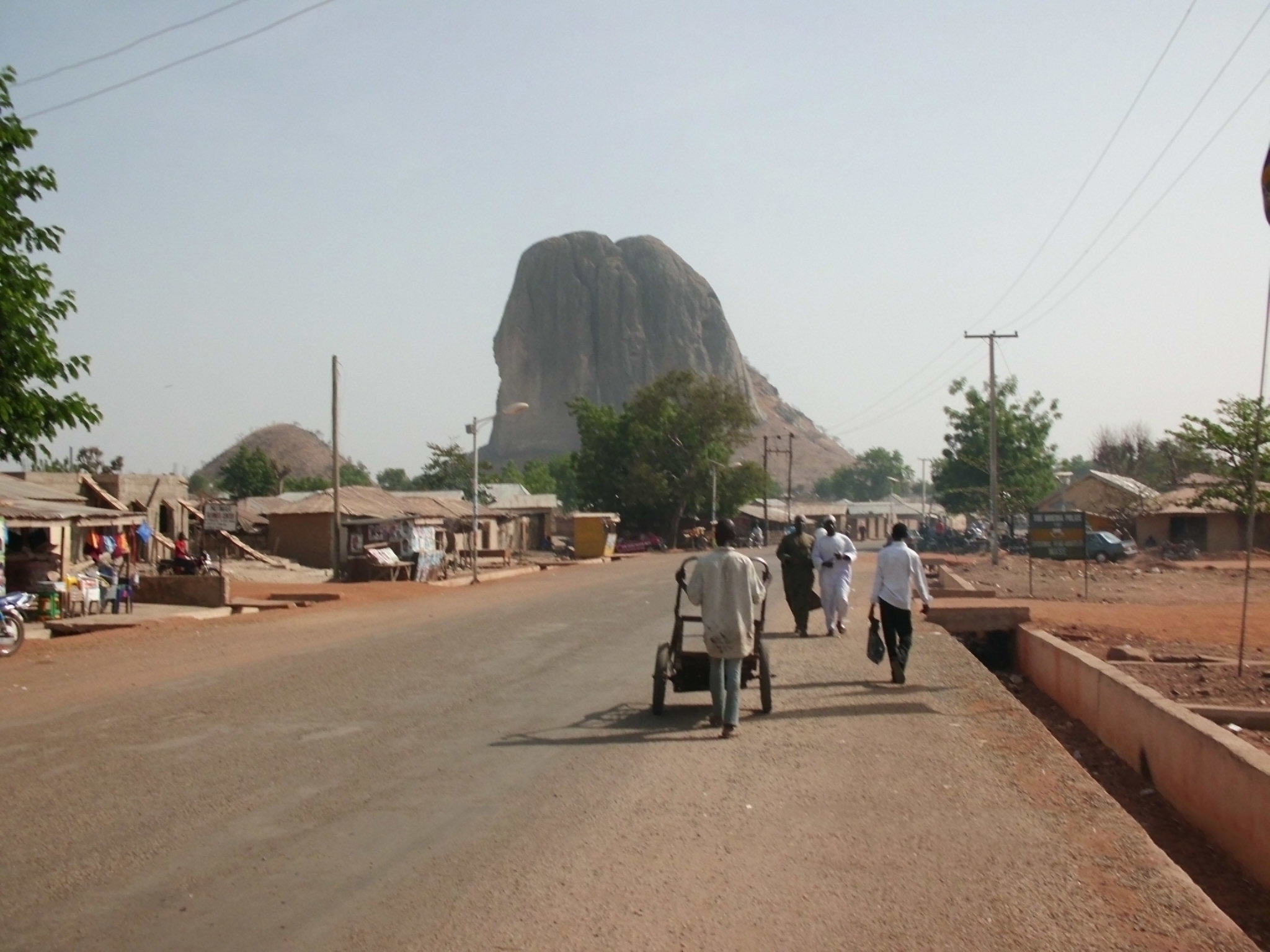
- City view of Wase Rock
- Nickname: Kafin Madaki Hasan
- Motto: The land of Agriculture
- Interactive map of Wase
- Location within Nigeria
- Coordinates: 9°05′38″N 9°57′24″E
- Country: Nigeria
- State: Plateau State
- LGA Creation: 1976

Government
  - Type: Democracy
  - Chairman: Hamisu Haruna Anani
  - Emir (King): Muhammadu (Sambo) Haruna

Area
  - Total: 4,306 km^{2} (1,663 sq mi)
- Elevation: 242 m (794 ft)

Population (2006)
  - Total: 161,714
  - Density: 38/km^{2} (98/sq mi)
- Time zone: UTC+1 (WAT)
- ZIP code: 942105
- Area code: 942001
- Website: https://www.plateaustate.gov.ng/wase

Wase (pronounced: Wersæy) is a town and Local Government Area (LGA) of Plateau State, Nigeria, situated some 200 kilometres (120 mi) south east of Jos, the Plateau State capital. It shares boundary with Kanam LGA to the north, Taraba State to the south and east, and Langtang North LGA to the west. The population of the LGA was 161,714 people as of 2006, with an urban area of 1750 km^{2}.

== Climate ==
The climate of Wase is Tropical Continental Climate it is also called Sudan Climate, this climate is also known as Aw Köppen Climate In Wase, the dry season is oppressively hot and partially cloudy, and the wet season is oppressively hot and cloudy. The average annual temperature fluctuates between 18 °C (65 °F) and 38 °C (101 °F), rarely falling below 16 °C (60 °F) or rising over 41 °C (105 °F).

=== Average Temperature ===
The 2.5-month hot season, which runs from January 29 to April 14 (average daily high temperature above 36 °C or 97 °F), is marked by high temperatures. March is the warmest month of the year in Wase, with typical high temperatures of 38 °C (100 °F) and low temperatures of 24 °C (75 °F). The 3.9-month chilly season, which runs from June 23 to October 18, has daily highs that are typically lower than 31 °C (87 °F). In Wase, August is the coldest month of the year, with typical lows of 22 °C (72 °F) and highs of 29 °C (84 °F).

== History ==
=== 19th century ===
Historical records indicate that the founders of Wase town were the Fulani, who established the settlement in 1813AD during the Jihad of Shehu Usman Danfodio of blessed memory, the movement that culminated in the rise of the Nineteenth Century Sokoto Caliphate. Wase was deliberately founded to support the effective prosecution of the Jihad along the south-eastern flank of the Bauchi territory within the expanding Caliphate. Consequently, the town became one of the most formidable military outposts in the Bauchi region for the nineteenth-century Jihadists, particularly during the formative years of the Caliphate, which was founded and administered on the Islamic legal system instituted by the late Shehu Usman Danfodio and his pupils.

The founder of Wase was Giwa, a prominent Fulani who originally resided in Wuro Mayo in the then Bauchi region. Around 1813AD, he migrated to the Wase area and established the town. After founding the settlement, the itinerant Giwa continued to travel between Wase and Bauchi for about five years. He died at Wuro Mayo around 1816, leaving behind three sons — Hassan, Abdu and Umaru — from whom the three traditional ruling houses of Wase emerged. Supporting this historical account, A. H. Kirk-Green stated on page 48 of the Gazetteers of the Northern Provinces of Nigeria that: “Giwa, a Fulani living at Wuro Mayo in Bauchi, was the founder of the Wase dynasty. He came to the Wase country… making friends with Jukun who were living near the present town of Wase.”

Similarly, J. M. Freemantle observed: “Giwa, a Fulani living at Wuro Mayo in Bauchi, was the original founder of the Wase dynasty. He came to the Wase country and, as he liked it, he continued going backwards and forwards for five years, making friends with the Jukun who were living near the present town of Wase. Giwa died at Wuro Mayo, about 1816, leaving three sons, Hassan, Abdu and Umoru.”

The Fulani Emirate of Wase was subsequently founded by Hassan, the eldest son of Giwa, between 1817AD and 1820AD. After his father's death, Hassan became the Madaki of Bauchi under Mallam Yakubu, the flag-bearer of the Jihad in the Bauchi region and the founder of the Bauchi Emirate. Madaki Hassan had studied under Shehu Usman Danfodio, and when Danfodio dispatched Mallam Yakubu—one of his most prominent pupils—to mobilise supporters in the region, Hassan accompanied him. Upon the formal commencement of the Jihad in Bauchi, when Malam Yakubu received the flag of authority, he appointed Hassan as his Chief of Cavalry with the title of Madaki, and together they returned to Bauchi to prosecute the campaign.

During the course of the Jihad, Malam Yakubu and Madaki Hassan visited Wase, the settlement founded by Hassan's late father and a place for which Hassan had developed a strong affinity. At this time, Madaki Hassan expressed his desire to settle permanently in Wase owing to its favourable climate and the presence of the renowned Wase Rock. Mallam Yakubu acceded to this request, reportedly mindful of an earlier caution from Sultan Muhammadu Bello, the son of Shehu Usman Danfodio, who had advised him to be circumspect about the growing power and influence of Madaki Hassan.

Subsequently, the two leaders wrote a letter to the Sultan in Sokoto seeking approval to establish the city of Wase. Permission was granted, with the condition that the town be built on the northern side of the Wase Rock. In compliance, the town of Wase was constructed, and Malam Yakubu formally entrusted the entire territory to Madaki Hassan, who developed it into his headquarters and laid the foundations of what became the Fulani Emirate of Wase.

Later on Wase became part of the British Royal Niger Company protectorate (later Northern Nigeria) following the arrival of British troops in 1898. Wase was a part of Plateau Province.

=== 21st century ===
In February 2026, a significant gas leak occurred at a lead and zinc mine in the town owned by Solid Unity Nigeria Ltd., killing at least 33 people.

== Environment ==
Around 321 ha (3.21 km^{2}; 1.24 sq mi; 790 acres) of land around Wase is conserved for wildlife development and serves as a bird sanctuary - local species include the Rossy White Pelican. The protected land includes Wase Rock, a massive dome-shaped inselberg of volcanic origin standing at 350 m (380 yd; 1,150 ft) in height, making it visible from a distance of some 40 kilometres (25 miles).

The region is renowned for its mining activities due to a high concentration of lead, zinc, tin and other minerals. This has attracted considerable interest from Chinese investors who have constructed few local bridges and other infrastructure close to Wase's mining sites, although these services have not always reached the local community.

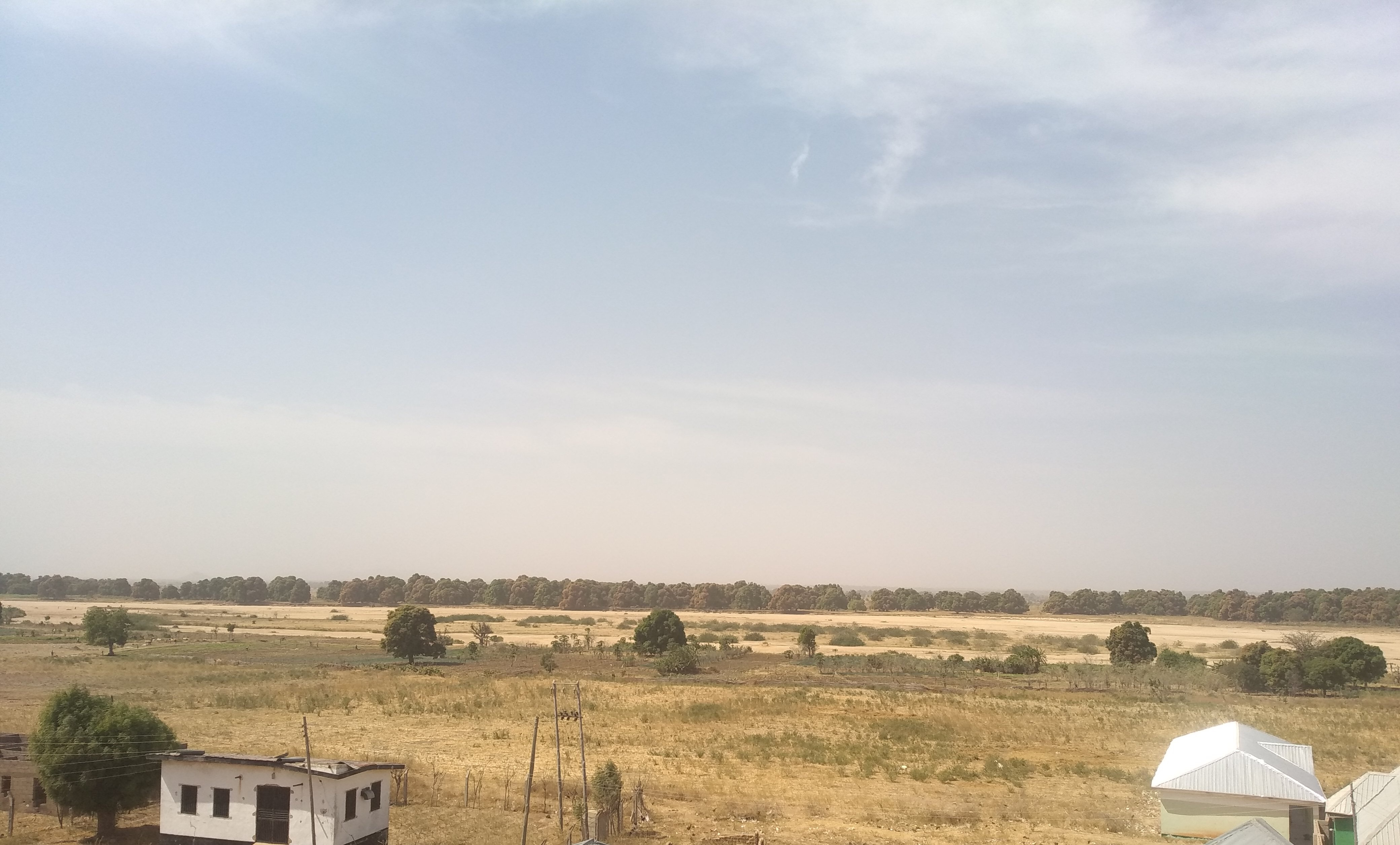
Wase river

Wase is among the major local government area contributing to food security in Nigeria due to its rich and fertile land. Among the food and cash crops cultivated in the area include Rice, Maize, millet, guinea corn, cotton, yam, cassava, sweet potato, soya beans, beans including okro, pepper and other vegetables and spices. With its pasture and fulani herders, it is among the largest LGA on the Plateau that is known as a home to cattle rearing.

Wase also produce and export mango, water melon, sweet melon and other fruits to various communities across the country.

Cattle, rice, yam, wood, charcoal, and other solid minerals including other commodities are always exported from Wase to various local and international markets.

== Population ==
The 2006 census population of Wase LGA was 159,861. There is a near-equal gender distribution (50.3% male) and a predominantly youthful population - 47.3% are younger than 15, whereas only 2.7% are aged 65 and over. The ethnic groups in Wase are the Hausa/Fulani, Yankam (Hausa: Basharawa), Boghom (Hausa: Burmawa), Jukun and Tarok (Hausa:Yargamawa). The major religions are Islam, Christianity, and the traditional African religion.

== Traditional Council ==
The main tribal groups in the local council are Fulani, Boghom, Jukun, (Yankam) Basharawa, Hausa, Tarok and Kanuri, among others. Emirs in Wase are selected by a council of seven kingmakers. The 13th Emir of Wase was Alhaji (Dr.) Haruna Abdullahi Maikano. He was nominated three months after the death of his father in September 2001, although this was not confirmed until the following year. He was assisted by the Rekna of Bashar, Alh. Adamu Idris, in conducting the affairs of the traditional council, who rule in the absence of the emir. Haruna Abdullah died in September 2010 at the age of 64. Alh Dr Muhammadu Sambo Haruna replaced late Dr Haruna Abdullah as the 14th Emir of Wase with effect from 28 October 2010.

== Political Division ==
Wase is a local government and also a single state and federal constituency with headquartered in Wase town. Administratively, Wase is divided into four districts, namely: Wase, predominantly inhabited by Fulani, Hausa, Kanuri and other ethnic groups; Bashar, predominantly inhabited by Basharawa, Burmawa, Jarawa and other tribes; Lamba, predominantly inhabited by Boghom, Fulani, Jukun, Taroh and others; and Kadarko, predominantly inhabited by Taroh, Fulani, Jukun, Tiv, Kwala and others. Wase is headed by an Emir who is also called SARKIN DUTSE and Chairman of the Traditional Council comprising all the heads of the other traditional rulers of the other three districts. Rekna heads Bashar, Lamba is headed by the Hakimi while Kadarko is headed by Ponzhi Kadarko. There are also a sizeable number of Hakimi in each of the four districts while the various towns and villages under each district are being headed by the ward head known as Mai Unguwa.

Wase Local Government Area also consist of 12 federal wards including Danbiram, Kuyambana, Mavo, Kadarko, Kumbwong, Kumbur, Wase Tofa, Saluwe, Yola Wakat, Bashar, Nyalun/Kampani and Gudus while the state government recognizes 20 wards with each producing a councilor representing it at the local government legislative arm. The state wards include Danbiram, Garkuwa, Kuyambana, Mallam Adama, Mavo, Kadarko, Gimbi/Pinau, Wadata, Kumbur, Kumbwong, Wase Tofa, Saluwe, Yola Wakat, Lamba, Bashar, Gudus, Gaji, Yuli, Safiyo and Nyalun/Kampani
