= Kapya language =

Plateau language of Nigeria

Kapya
- Native to: Nigeria
- Region: Taraba State
- Native speakers: 200 (2004)
- Language family: Niger–Congo?: Atlantic–Congo; Benue–Congo; Kuteb–Kapya; Kapya

Language codes
- ISO 639-3: klo
- Glottolog: kapy1238
- ELP: Kapya

Kapya is a Benue–Congo language spoken in Kapya village, Takum LGA, Taraba State, eastern Nigeria.

Kapya is a village and the administrative headquarters of Kapya people (Benyi's). Until the coming of both Christianity and Islam, the Kapya people were followers of their own traditional religions.

There must dominant areas includes Kapya Adda, Kapya Akikai, Kapya Baba, Takum, and others.

== Classification ==
Together, Kapya and Kuteb form an independent branch of the Benue–Congo languages according to Roger Blench (2026).
