= Benue–Congo languages =

Major subdivision of the Niger–Congo language family

Benue–Congo
- East Benue–Congo
- Geographic distribution: Africa, from Nigeria eastwards and southwards
- Linguistic classification: Niger–Congo?: Atlantic–Congo; Volta–Congo; Benue–Congo
- Subdivisions: Bantoid–Cross; Jukunoid; Kainji; Plateau; Yukubenic; Fali of Baissa †; Tita; ? Ukaan

Language codes
- Glottolog: benu1247
- The Benue–Congo languages shown within the Niger–Congo language family. Non-Benue–Congo languages are greyscale.

Benue–Congo (sometimes called East Benue–Congo) is a major branch of the Volta–Congo languages which covers most of Sub-Saharan Africa.

== Subdivisions ==
Central Nigerian (or Platoid) contains the Plateau, Jukunoid and Kainji families, and Bantoid–Cross combines the Bantoid and Cross River groups.

Bantoid is only a collective term for every subfamily of Bantoid–Cross except Cross River, and this is no longer seen as forming a valid branch, however one of the subfamilies, Southern Bantoid, is still considered valid. It is Southern Bantoid which contains the Bantu languages, which are spoken across most of Sub-Saharan Africa. This makes Benue–Congo one of the largest subdivisions of the Niger–Congo language family, both in number of languages, of which Ethnologue counts 976 (2017), and in speakers, numbering perhaps 350 million. Benue–Congo also includes a few minor isolates in the Nigeria–Cameroon region, but their exact relationship is uncertain.

The neighbouring Volta–Niger branch of Nigeria and Benin is sometimes called "West Benue–Congo", but it does not form a united branch with Benue–Congo. When Benue–Congo was first proposed by Joseph Greenberg (1963), it included Volta–Niger (as West Benue–Congo); the boundary between Volta–Niger and Kwa has been repeatedly debated. Blench (2012) states that if Benue–Congo is taken to be "the noun-class languages east and north of the Niger", it is likely to be a valid group, though no demonstration of this has been made in print.

The Benue–Congo branches of Nigeria and Cameroon

The branches of the Benue–Congo family are thought to be as follows:

- Bantoid–Cross languages
  - Bantoid
    - Northern
    - Southern
  - Cross River
- Central Nigerian languages, also known as Platoid
  - Jukunoid
  - Kainji
  - Plateau

Ukaan is also related to Benue–Congo; Roger Blench suspects it might be either the most divergent (East) Benue–Congo language or the closest relative to Benue–Congo.

Fali and Tita are also Benue–Congo but are otherwise unclassified.

Blench (2026) presents a revised classification. He classifies Kainji as a primary split since Kainji does not have many lexical roots that are found in Plateau, Jukunoid, Yukubenic, and Cross River.

- Benue–Congo
  - Kainji
  - (core)
    - Plateau
    - Central Jukunoid
    - Kuteb–Kapya
    - Yukubenic
    - Cross River
    - Mambiloid, Dakoid, Bantoid

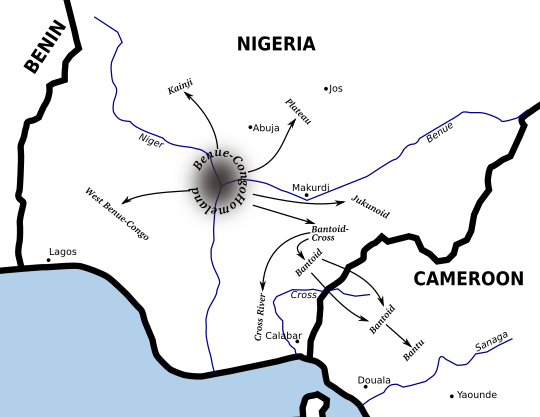
The Benue-Congo homeland and dispersal of the sub-branches

== Branches and locations (Nigeria) ==
Below is a list of major Benue–Congo branches and their primary locations (centres of diversity) within Nigeria based on Blench (2019).

Distributions of Benue–Congo branches in Nigeria
Branch	Primary locations
Cross River	Cross River, Akwa Ibom, and Rivers States; Cameroon
Bendi	Obudu and Ogoja LGAs, Cross River State
Mambiloid	Sardauna LGA, Taraba State; Cameroon
Dakoid	Mayo Belwa LGA, Taraba State and adjacent areas
Jukunoid	Taraba, Benue, Nasarawa, Gombe, Adamawa, Bauchi, and Plateau States of Nigeria; Cameroon
Yukubenic	Takum LGA, Taraba State; Cameroon
Kainji	Kauru and Lere LGAs, Kaduna State; and Bassa LGA, Plateau State; Kano State; Kainji Lake area of Niger and Kebbi States
Plateau	Plateau, Kaduna, Nasarawa, Niger and Bauchi States and the FCT
Tivoid	Benue State; Obudu LGA, Cross River State and Sardauna LGA, Taraba State; Nasarawa State; Cameroon
Beboid	Takum LGA, Taraba State; Cameroon
Ekoid	Ikom and Ogoja LGAs, Cross River State; Cameroon
Grassfields	Sardauna LGA, Taraba State; Cameroon
Jarawan	Bauchi, Plateau, Adamawa, and Taraba States

== Comparative vocabulary ==
Sample basic vocabulary for reconstructed proto-languages of different Benue-Congo branches:

Branch	Language	eye	ear	nose	tooth	tongue	mouth	blood	bone	tree	water	eat	name
Benue-Congo	Proto-Benue-Congo	*-lito	*-tuŋi	*-zua	*-nini, *-nino; *-sana; *-gaŋgo	*-lemi; *-lake		*-zi; *-luŋ	*-kupe	*-titi; *-kwon	*-izi; *-ni		*-zina
Kainji	Proto-Northern Jos	**iji (lì-/à-)	*toŋ (ù-/tì-)	*nyimu (bì-/ì-)	*ʔini (lì-/à-)	*lelem (lì-/à-)	*nua (ù-/tì-)	*nyì(aw) (mà-)		*ti (with reduplication) (ù-/tì-)	*nyi (mà-)	*lia	*ji(a) (lì-/sì-)
Plateau	Proto-Jukunoid	*giP (ri-/a-)	*tóŋ (ku-/a-)	*wíǹ (ri-/a-)	*baŋ (ku-/a-); *gyín (ri-/a-)	*déma (ri-/a-)	*ndut (u-/i-)	*yíŋ (ma-)	*kup (ku-/a-)	*kun (ku-/i-)	*mbyed	*dyi	*gyin (ri-/a-)
Plateau	Proto-Kagoro	*-gi	*-two		*nii[ŋ]	*-dyam	*-nu[ŋ]	*-suok	*-kup	*-kwan	*-sii		
Plateau	Proto-Jaba	*gu-su	*gu-to[ŋ]		*-gi[ŋ]	*ga-lem	*ga-nyu	*ba-zi	*gu-kup				
Plateau	Proto-Beromic	*-gis	*-toŋ		*-ɣiŋ	*-lyam	*-nu	*nì-ji	*-kup	*-kon	*-sii		
Plateau	Proto-Ninzic	*ki-sị́	*ku-tóŋ		*ki-Nyin / *-Nyir	*ì-rem	*-nuŋ / *-n[y]uŋ	*ma-ɣì	*kù-kụp	*ù-kon	*a-ma-sit		
Cross	Proto-Upper Cross	*dyèná	*-ttóŋ(ì)	*dyòná	*-ttân	*-dák	*-mà	*-dè; *-yìŋ	*-kúpà	*-tté	*-nì	*dyá	*-dínà
Cross	Proto-Lower Cross	*ɛ́-ɲɛ̀n / *a-	*ú-tɔ́ŋ / *a-	*í-búkó	*é-dɛ̀t / *a-	*ɛ́-lɛ́mɛ̀ / *a-	*í-núà	*-ɟìːp	*ɔ́-kpɔ́	*é-tíé	*ˊ-mɔ́ːŋ	*líá	*ɛ́-ɟɛ́n
Cross	Proto-Ogoni	*adɛ́ɛ̃	*ɔ̀tɔ́̃	*m̀ bĩɔ́̃	*àdáNa	*àdídɛ́Nɛ́		*m̀ miNi, *m̀ muNu	*ákpogó	*èté	m̀ mṹṹ	*dè	*àbée
Grassfields	Proto-Grassfields	*Ít`	*túŋ-li	*L(u)Í`	*sòŋ´	*lím`	*cùl`	*lém`; *cÌ´	*gÚp; *kúi(n)´	*tí´	*LÍb; *kÌ´; *mò´	*lÍa	*lÍn`; *kúm
Grassfields	Proto-Ring	*túɛ̀	*túndé	*dúì, *tɔ́ŋ	*túŋɔ̀, *góìk	*dɔ́mì, *dídè	*dúɔ̀	*dúŋá, *káŋù	*gúpɛ́	*kák`, *tíɛ́	*múɔ̀	*dúɛ̀	*dítɔ́, *gíd'
Bantu	Proto-Bantu	*i=jíco	*kʊ=tʊ́i	*i=jʊ́lʊ	*i=jíno; *i=gego	*lʊ=lɪ́mi	*ka=nʊa; *mʊ=lomo	*ma=gilá; *=gil-a; *ma=gadí; *=gadí; *mʊ=lopa; *ma=ɲínga	*i=kúpa	*mʊ=tɪ́	*ma=jíjɪ; *i=diba (HH?)	*=lɪ́ -a	*i=jína
Bantu	Swahili	jicho	sikio	pua	jino	ulimi	kinywa	damu (Ar.)	mfupa	mti	maji	la	jina

Based upon archaeological and lexicostatistical evidence—linking pottery-related terminology in proto-Benue-Congo with an estimated date for the introduction of pottery into the Grassfields region, and comparison of lexical items within related languages via Levenshtein (edit) distance, respectively—it has been suggested that Benue-Congo may be one of the world's oldest extant distinct linguistic subfamilies.

== See also ==
- List of Proto-Benue-Congo reconstructions (Wiktionary)
- Systematic graphic of the Niger–Congo languages with numbers of speakers
