= Muri Mountains =

Mountain range in Nigeria

Coordinates: 9°34′N 11°20′E

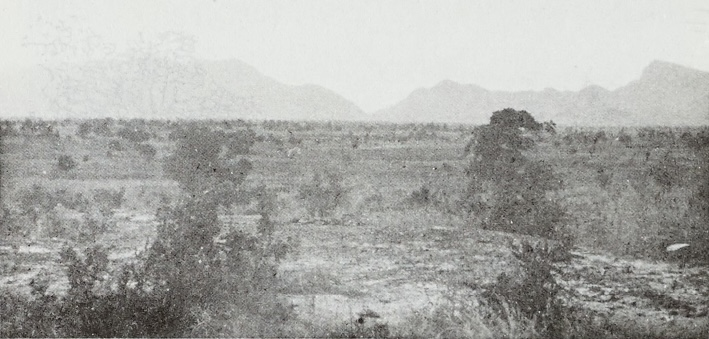
- Silhouette of a part of the northern chain of the Muri Mountains. In the middle is the cleft where the river has cut through the rock.

Highest point
- Elevation: 1,000 m (3,300 ft)

Geography
- Country: Nigeria

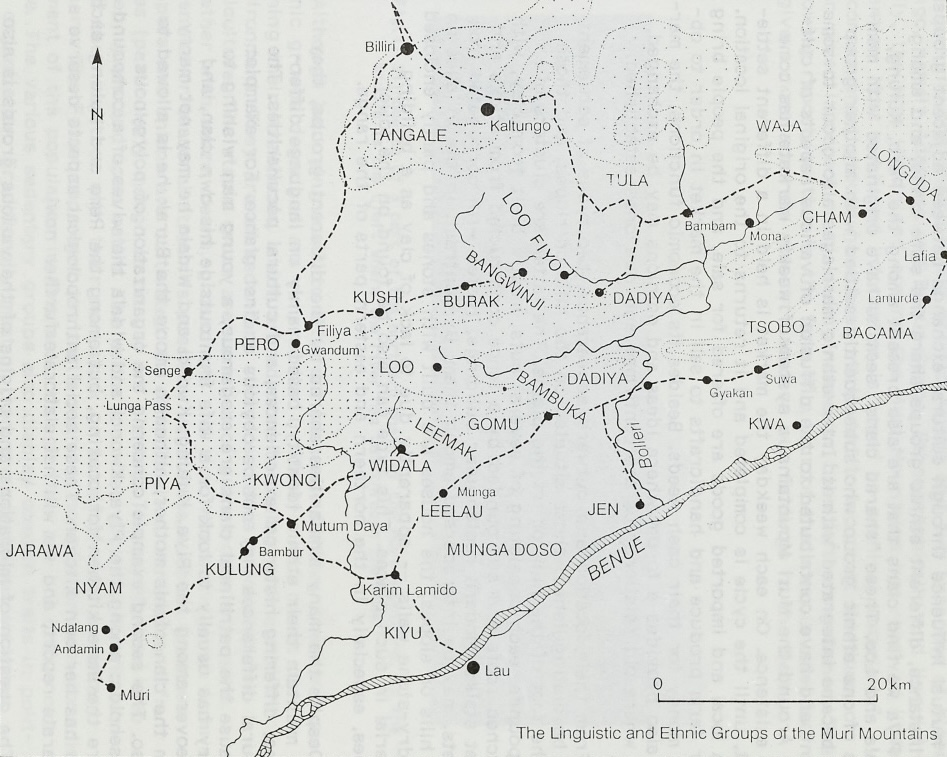
Linguistic and ethnic map of the area of the Muri Mountains (published 1992)

The Muri Mountains are a mountain range in Northern Nigeria. They consist of two nearly parallel sandstone mountain chains running east to west along the boundaries of the federal states of Bauchi, Gombe, Taraba, and Adamawa. A river cuts through the north chain, forming a river basin between the two chains and gathering water before it cuts through the south chain and flows into the Benue River. Scattered hills are present within the basin, mostly formed volcanically. To the east they merge into the Lunguda plateau, and to the west they merge into the Bauchi plateau. The area is not easily accessible due to the mountainous landscape and partial seasonal flooding, and as a result has retained an economically and politically marginal status.

== Ethnic groups ==
About twenty different small ethnic groups live in the mountains, speaking languages from the Chadic, Adamawa, and Benue–Congo language groups. Ethnic groups living in and around the mountains as of 1992 include the Kushi, the Pero, the Piya, the Kwonci, the Kholok of Wídálá, the Nyam, the Tangale, the Bacama, the Kulung, the Kiyu, the Kwa, the Loo, the Burak, the Leemák, the Tala of Kode, the Leeláú (Ya-Leelau), the Gomu, the Bambuka, the Jen, the Munga Doso, the Bangwinji, the Dadiya, the Cham, the Tsóbó, the Waja, and the Longuda.

== Languages ==
Languages spoken in the Muri Mountains belong to the Afroasiatic, Niger–Congo, and Nilo-Saharan phyla. There is also one language isolate, Jalaa.

- Isolate: Jalaa
- Afroasiatic languages
  - West Chadic languages: Tangale, Pero, Piya, Kwonci, Kushi, Kode (Kholok), Nyam
  - Central Chadic languages: Dera, Tera, Bacama
- Niger–Congo languages
  - Adamawa languages
    - Waja languages: Kamo, Tula, Awak, Waja, Dadiya, Bangwinji, Cham, Tsobo
    - Longuda
    - Bikwin–Jen languages: Leemak, Munga (Munga doso), Gomu, Bambuka, Lelau (Leelau), Loo, Burak, Bambuka, Jenjo, Tha
    - Baa
  - Jarawan Bantu languages: Kulung
  - North Jukunoid languages: Hone, Kiyu
- Nilo-Saharan languages
  - Sara–Bongo–Bagirmi languages: Lau Laka

The languages of the Muri Mountains have Jalaa-related substrata. Jalaa was presumably part of a larger phylum that Roger Blench refers to as Jalaaic, which was the original indigenous language phylum of the Muri Mountains. The earliest migrants to the Muri Mountains were like the Baa, followed by the Bikwin–Jen and then the Tula–Waja speakers and others. Chadic-speaking groups came later, followed by Jarawan and Jukunoid speakers, and finally Kaba Laka.

== History ==
Prior to the twentieth century, the Muri Mountains served as a place of refuge for populations moving to escape slave raiding. This was especially true after a jihad in 1804 created the Caliphate of Sokoto, in which a Fulani aristocracy ruled over significant parts of modern Northern Nigeria; numerous groups fled slave raids near the borders of the caliphate into impassable areas such as the Muri Mountains. After the caliphate was established the area around the Muri Mountains was raided for slaves by nearby emirates within it. The mountainous landscape and (at the time) extremely dense vegetation aided in defense against the emirates. Additionally, the Fulani emirates depended heavily on cavalry, which was ineffective in the mountains. Villages were strategically placed and well-defended.

The first Europeans to acquire thorough knowledge of the region and its people were the German explorers Eduard Vogel and Eduard Robert Flegel, in the 1800s. Most European travelers at the time went around the mountains rather than pass through them.

The societies within the Muri Mountains were never conquered by the nearby emirates, but were subjugated by the British in the early 1900s, who sent in punitive expeditions. The British conquest of the mountains was carried out by successive expeditions and patrols sent into the area and occurred over several years.
