= Muri, Taraba State =

Town in Taraba, Nigeria

Muri (Fula: Lamorde Muri 𞤤𞤢𞤥𞤮𞤪𞤣𞤫 𞤥𞤵𞥅𞤪𞤭) is a town and traditional emirate in Jalingo in Taraba State, northeastern Nigeria, approximately between 9° and 11° 40′ E. and 7° 10′ and 9° 40′ N. The Benue River is nearby, and the portion on the southern bank of the river is watered by streams flowing from the Cameroon region to the Benue. In 1991, the town was estimated to have a population of 56,570. The valley of the Benue has a climate generally unhealthy to Europeans but there are places in the northern part of the province, such as the Fula settlement of Wase on a southern spur of the Murchison hills, where the higher altitude gives an excellent climate.

Tula–Waja languages such as Dadiya and Bangwinji are spoken in the Muri Mountains.

== History ==
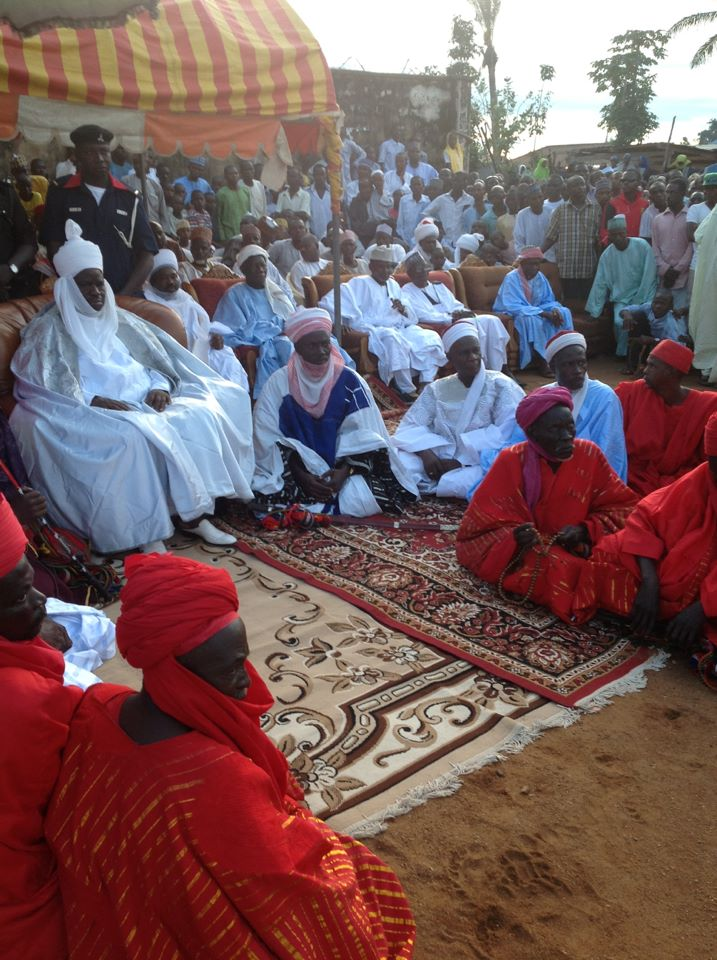
Emir of Muri Alh Abbas Tafida

In 1817, Muri was founded as a Fulbe jihad state. From the death of the founder of Muri, Hamman Ruwa, in 1833 to 1880, the emirate went through a period of "extreme" disunity. Some districts within the Emirate, like Gassol and Wurio, operated independently under princes of the central dynasty. It was only during the reign of Emir Abubakar dan Hamman Ruwa that a central government was able to operate throughout the Emirate. The Emirate was also engaged in constant battle with the Jukun Chiefdoms, particularly in Kona. Not long after Emir Abubakar death in 1896, the districts of Gassol and Wurio once again revolted against the Emirate, heavily defeating its army which was commanded by Hassan (soon to be Emir). A year later, rebels from the two districts were joined by the Emir's younger brother, Muhammadu Mafindi, as he felt the new Emir was not adequately catering for his many younger siblings. The Emirate's army was able to regroup and repel the rebels who were fast approaching Jalingo, its capital.

The Royal Niger Company had established a settlement, Ibi, within the Emirate since 1883. In 1884, 1888 and 1891 it sacked and burnt the town of Jibu. The comparatively weak Emirate was able to successfully apply a military sanction against the Company at Kunini and Lau in 1889. Lieutenant Antoine Mizon helped the Company conquer Kona in 1892. The company also sacked the towns of Wurio and Suntai in 1897 and 1899. In 1901, the Emirate, under Emir Hassan, submitted peacefully to the British.

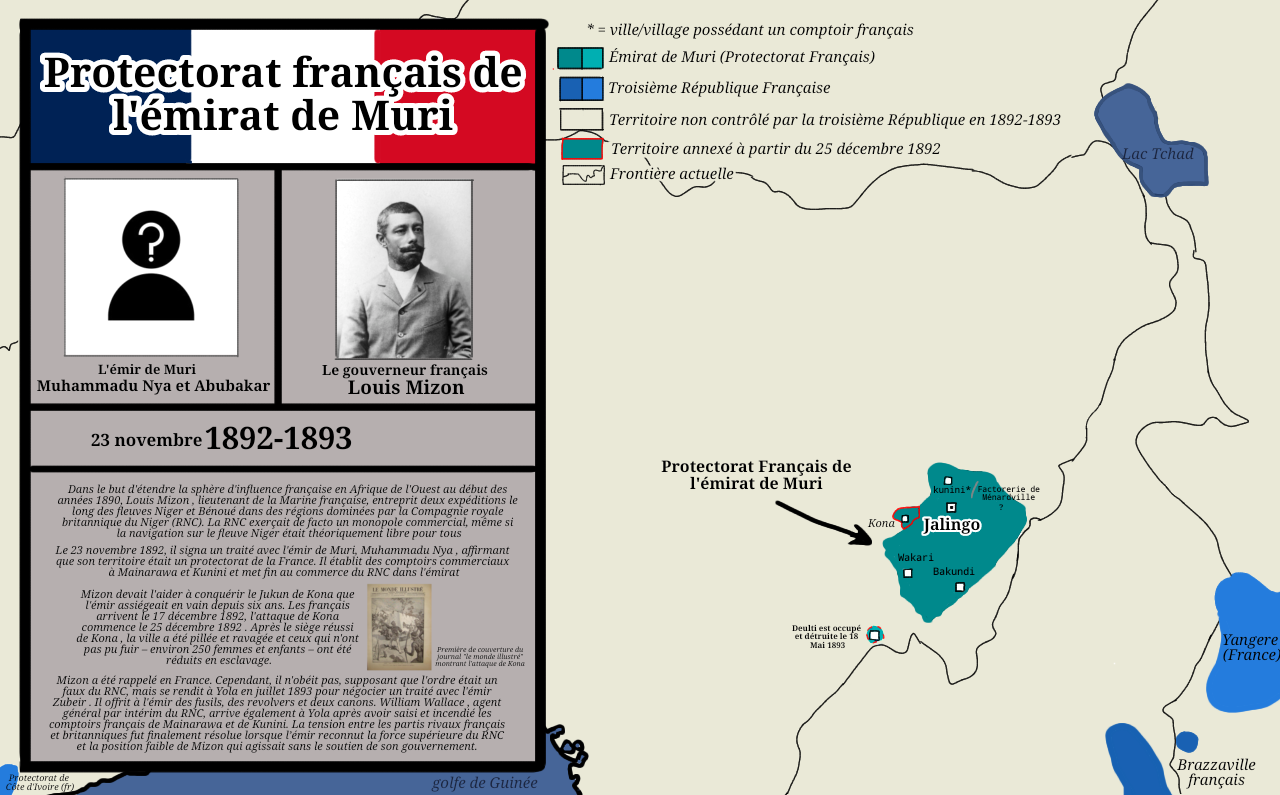
Map of the French protectorate of emirate of Muri

From 1892 to 1893 it was a de facto French protectorate, under Governor Louis Mizon (b. 1853 – d. 1899).

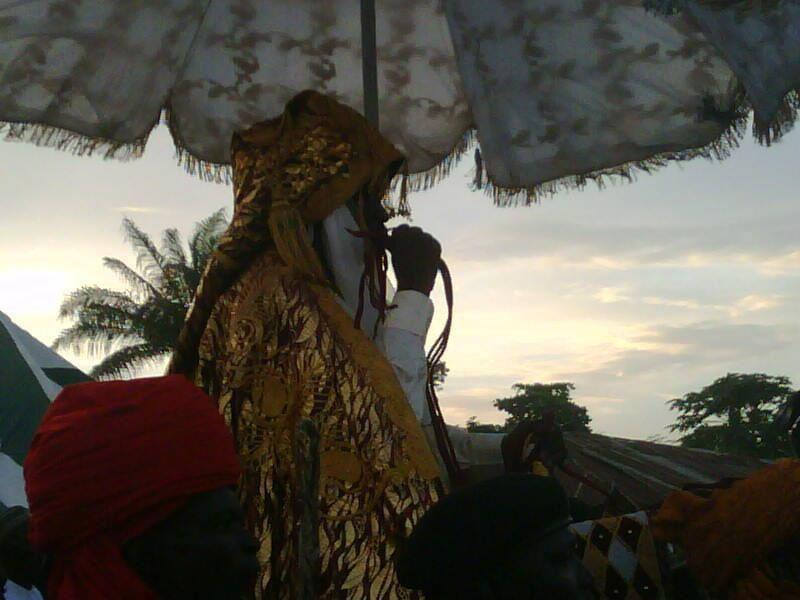
Emir Of Muri on horse back

In 1901 it became a 25,800 m^{2}. province of the British protectorate of Northern Nigeria, bordered S. by Southern Nigeria, SE. by German Cameroon, E. by the province of Yola, N. by Bauchi, W. by Nasarawa and Bassa with an estimated population of about 828,000. The district of Katsina-Ala extends south of the Benue considerably west of 9° E., the approximate limit of the remainder of the province. The province is rich in forest products, and the Niger Company maintained trading stations on the river. Cotton is grown, and spinning thread, weaving and dyeing afford occupation to many thousands. Muri province included the ancient Jukun empire together with various small Fula states and a number of pagan tribes, among whom the Munshi, who extended into the provinces of Nassarawa and Bassa, were among the most turbulent. The Munshi occupy about 4000 m^{2}. in the Katsina-Ala district. The pagan tribes in the north of the province were lawless cannibals who by constant outrages and murders of traders long rendered the mail trade route to Bauchi unsafe, and cut off the markets of the Benue valley and the Cameroon from the Hausa states. Only two routes, one via Wase and the other via Gatari, passed through this belt. In the south of the province a similar belt of hostile pagans closed the access to the Cameroon except by two routes, Takum and Beli. For Hausa traders to cross the Muri province was a work of such danger and expense that before the advent of British administration the attempt was seldom made.

Muri came nominally under British control in 1900. The principal effort of the administration has been to control and open the trade routes. In 1904 an expedition against the northern cannibals resulted in the capture of their principal fortresses and the settlement and opening to trade of a large district, the various routes to the Benue being rendered safe. In 1905 an expedition against the Munshi, rendered necessary by an unprovoked attack on the Niger Company's station at Abinsi, had a good effect in reducing the riverain portion of this tribe to submission. The absence of any central native authority delayed the process of bringing the province under administrative control. Its government was organized on the same system as the rest of Northern Nigeria, and under a British Resident. It was divided into three administrative divisions -east, central and west- with their respective headquarters at Lau, Amar and Ibi. Provincial and native courts of justice were established. The telegraph was carried to the town of Muri. Muri is one of the provinces in which the slave trade was most active, and its position between German territory and the Hausa states rendered it in the early days of the British administration a favorite route for the smuggling of slaves.

== List of Emirs ==
Emirs Of Muri
No.	Name	Reign start	Reign end
1	Hamman Ruwa dan Usman	1817	1833
2	Ibrahim dan Hamman Ruwa	1833	1848
3	Hamman dan Hamman Ruwa	1848	1861
4	Hamadu dan Bose	1861	1869
5	Burba dan Hamman	1869	1873
6	Abubakar dan Hamman Ruwa	1873	1874
7	Muhammadu Nya dan Abubakar	1874	1896
8	Hasan dan Muhammadu Nya	1896	1903
9	Muhammadu Mafinɗi dan Muhammadu Nya	1903	1953
10	Muhammadu Tukur dan Muhammadu Nya	1953	25 October 1965
11	Umaru Abba Tukur	6 November 1965	12 August 1986 (deposed)
12	Alhaji Abbas Njidda Tafida	13 July 1988	to date
