= Muhammadu =

Muhammadu is a given name. Notable people with the name include:

- Muhammadu Abali Ibn Muhammadu Idrissa (born 1956), 13th Emir of the Fika Emirate
- Muhammadu Abdullahi Wase (1948–1996), Nigerian military administrator
- Muhammadu Aminu (died 1975), 17th Emir of Zazzau
- Muhammadu Attahiru I (died 1903), 12th Sultan of the Sokoto Caliphate
- Muhammadu Attahiru II (died 1915), 13th Sultan of the Sokoto Caliphate
- Muhammadu Bako III (born 1972), Nigerian Emir of New Karshi
- Muhammadu Barkindo Aliyu Musdafa (born 1944), Lamido of Adamawa
- Muhammadu Bello Kagara (1890–1971), Nigerian educator, writer and royalist
- Muhammadu Buhari (1942–2025), Nigerian military officer and politician, president of Nigeria
- Muhammadu Dikko (1865–1944), 47th Emir of Katsina
- Muhammadu Dikko Yusufu (1931–2015), Nigerian politician and law enforcement officer
- Muhammadu Faal (born 1997), English footballer
- Muhammadu Gambo Jimeta (1937–2021), Inspector General of the Nigeria Police Force
- Muhammadu Gawo (1954–2019), Nigerian politician
- Muhammadu Junaidu (1906–1997), Nigerian historian and writer
- Muhammadu Kabir Usman (1928–2008), 49th Emir of Katsina
- Muhammadu Kobo (1910–2002), 11th Etsu Lapai of Lapai Emirate
- Muhammadu Kudu Abubakar (died 2014), Etsu of the Agaie Emirate
- Muhammadu Lawal Bello (born 1957), Chief Judge of the High Court of Justice of Kaduna State
- Muhammadu Maccido (1928–2006), 19th Sultan of Sokoto
- Muhammadu Maiturare (died 1924), Sultan of Sokoto
- Muhammadu Ndayako (1884–1962), 9th Etsu Nupe
- Muhammadu Ribadu (1909–1965), Nigerian politician and Minister of Defence
- Muhammadu Sanusi I, Emir of Kano
- Muhammadu Tambari, Sultan of Sokoto

== See also ==
- Mohammadu
