= Jalaa language =

Extinct language of northeastern Nigeria

Jalaa
- Centúúm
- bàsàrə̀n dà jàlààbè̩
- Native to: Nigeria
- Region: Loojaa settlement in Balanga Local Government Area, Gombe State
- Native speakers: (few rememberers cited 1992)
- Language family: Language isolate

Language codes
- ISO 639-3: cet
- Glottolog: cent2045
- ELP: Centúúm

Jalaa (autonym: bàsàrə̀n dà jàlààbè̩), also known as Cèntûm, Centúúm or Cen Tuum, is an extinct language of northeastern Nigeria (Loojaa settlement in Balanga Local Government Area, Gombe State), of uncertain origins, apparently a language isolate. The Jalabe (as descendants of speakers of the language are called) speak the Bwilim dialect of the Dikaka language. It is possible (but unconfirmed) that some remembered words have been retained for religious ceremonies, but in 1992 only a few elders remember words that their parents had used, and by 2010 there may not have even remained any such rememberers.

== History ==
The Jalabe are said to have come to Loojaa from an area a few miles south within the Muri Mountains, where they had shared a settlement with Tso and Kwa clans. (The name of this settlement, Cèntûm or Cùntûm, is used as a name for the language in some sources. Jalaa elders differ in whether they believe Jalaa or Centum/Cuntum was their original name for themselves.) Later, during the nineteenth century, the Dikaka arrived in the area, fleeing attacks from the larger Waja to the north; the Cham intermarried with the Jalabe, and the Jalabe began to adopt the Dikaka language.

The diverse languages of the Muri Mountains, which include various Adamawa and Chadic languages, have Jalaa-related substrata. Jalaa was presumably part of a larger phylum that Roger Blench refers to as Jalaaic, which was the original indigenous language phylum of the Muri Mountains. The earliest migrants to the Muri Mountains were like the Baa, followed by the Bikwin–Jen and then the Tula–Waja speakers and others. Chadic-speaking groups later came to the Muri Mountains, followed by Jarawan and Jukunoid speakers, and finally Kaba Laka.

== Phonology ==
The phonology of Jalaa is as follows.

Consonants
		Labial	Alveolar	Postalveolar/ Palatal	Velar	Labial-velar	Glottal
Nasal		m	n	ɲ	ŋ		
Plosive/ Affricate	voiceless	p	t	t͡ʃ	k	kp	
Plosive/ Affricate	voiced	b	d	d͡ʒ	g		
Fricative		f	s				h
Approximant			l	j		w	
Trill			r				

Vowels
	Front	Central	Back
Close	i		u
Near-close	ɪ		ʊ
Close-mid	e	ə	o
Open-mid	ɛ		ɔ
Open		a	

== Morphology ==
Jalaa morphology (at least in its present form) is almost identical to that of Cham. The main differences in the noun class system are two of the plural suffixes: Jalaa -ta versus Cham -te̩ and (for humans) Jalaa -bo, -ba versus Cham -b(e̩).

Noun morphology is similar to that of Cham, but with some differences. Some sample singular and plural noun sets in Jalaa and Cham:

Gloss	Jalaa		Cham	
Gloss	sg.	pl.	sg.	pl.
mouth	bɔɔ	bɔɔní	ɲii	ɲiini
tree	gwììràŋ	gwììtɛ̀	riyaŋ	riitɛ
meat	lìbò	lìbòté	nàm	nàmtɛ
hole	suroŋ	suroŋte		
nose	yamər	yaməta	ʤʊ̀r	ʤʊ̀tɛ
leg	kobər	kobta		
fish	fui	fuuta		
wife	ʧùwì	ʧùùbó		
person	nətâ	nətaaba	nii	nə̀b
crocodile			kùlɔŋ	kùlɔ̀ŋtɛ
knot			fúbər	fúbtɛ
dog			ʤɔil	ʤɔɔtɛ
stranger			(nii) fui	fùbɛ

== Lexicon ==
The Jalaa lexicon is also strongly influenced by Dikaka (which it has in turn influenced); some similarities are also found with the nearby Tso. However, most of its vocabulary is extremely unusual. In Kleinewillinghöfer's words, "The major part of the lexicon seems to differ entirely from all the surrounding languages, which themselves represent different language families."

Both Dikaka and the Tso traditionally avoided using names of the dead. When those names were also words of the language, as often happened, this forced them to change the word, sometimes by replacing it with a word from a neighboring language. Kleinewillinghöfer regards this as a motivation for certain cases of borrowing from Jalaa into Dikaka.

=== Numerals ===
The numerals 1-6 in Jalaa are:

1. násán
2. tiyú, tə́só
3. tətáá, bwànbí
4. təbwár, ŋbár
5. (tə)nó
6. tənúkùn

Above 5, the numerals are almost identical to Dikaka. The numerals 2 through 5 are almost identical with Tso, while "one" has no clear cognates.

== See also ==
- Bung language
- Komta language

== Bibliography ==
- Crozier, David H.; Blench, Roger M.; Hansford, Keir; Stanford, Ronald; Bendor-Samuel, John T. (1992) [1976]. An index of Nigerian languages (2nd ed.). Abuja; Dallas, TX: Nigerian Language Development Centre, Department of Linguistics and Nigerian Languages, University of Ilorin; Summer Institute of Linguistics.
