= 1991 Niger State gubernatorial election =

1991 gubernatorial election in Niger State, Nigeria

Niger gubernatorial election
- December 14, 1991
Nominee	Musa Inuwa
Party	NRC
Elected Governor
Musa Inuwa
NRC

The 1991 Niger State gubernatorial election occurred on December 14, 1991. NRC candidate Musa Inuwa won the election.

== Conduct ==
The gubernatorial election was conducted using an open ballot system. Primaries for the two parties to select their flag bearers were conducted on October 19, 1991.

The election occurred on December 14, 1991. NRC candidate Musa Inuwa won the election.
