= Umaru Bago Tafida =

Ruler of Lapai in Niger State, Nigeria

Umaru Bago Tafida III (born 1954) is the 12th Emir, Etsu, or traditional ruler of Lapai in Niger State, Nigeria appointed in July 2002. He succeeded Emir Alhaji Muhammadu Kobo, who died at the age of 92 after ruling for 48 years, and was appointed to the stool by the Niger State governor Abdulkadir Kure.

Umaru's turbanning and presentation of staff of office was attended by Vice president Atiku Abubakar and former Military President Ibrahim Babangida.

== Biography ==
As a member of the Niger State Council of Chiefs, in March 2003, he endorsed the People's Democratic Party (PDP) in the upcoming elections. Other members of the council endorsing the PDP included the Etsu Nupe (Sanda Ndayako), Emir of Suleja (Awwal Ibrahim), Etsu Agaie, Emir of Minna and Emir of Kagara.

In January 2009, he was among leaders supporting Edo State governor Adams Oshiomhole in calling for a probe into corruption in the 1999-2007 administration of President Olusegun Obasanjo.

In July 2009, he was part of a delegation led by the Etsu Nupe, Alhaji Yahaya Abubakar and including the Etsu Agaie, Muhammadu Kudu Abubakar that called on the House of Assembly to consider formation of a new Edu State as a base for the Nupe people.

In June 2010, a clash between Fulani cattle herdsmen and Nupe farmers in Lapai Emirate caused about 15 deaths. The Fulanis, who arrived by bus armed with sophisticated weapons and waited for villagers to emerge from the Mosque after prayers, were apparently seeking revenge for an earlier killing. Fidau prayers were held at the palace of Umar Bago before the bodies were interred.
