= 1999 Niger State gubernatorial election =

1999 gubernatorial election in Niger State, Nigeria

- January 9, 1999
| Nominee | Abdulkadir Kure |
| Party | PDP | All People's Party (Nigeria) |
| Popular vote | 600,695 | 158,549 |
Governor before election
Musa Inuwa
NRC
Elected Governor
Abdulkadir Kure
PDP

The 1999 Niger State gubernatorial election occurred in Nigeria on January 9, 1999. The PDP nominee Abdulkadir Kure won the election, defeating the APP candidate.

Abdulkadir Kure emerged PDP candidate.

== Electoral system ==
The Governor of Niger State is elected using the plurality voting system.

== Primary election ==
=== PDP primary ===
The PDP primary election was won by Abdulkadir Kure.

== Results ==
The total number of registered voters in the state was 1,553,303. Total number of votes cast was 786,979 while number of valid votes was 764,646. Rejected votes were 22,334.

| Candidate | Party | Votes | % |
|---|---|---|---|
| Abdulkadir Kure | People's Democratic Party | 600,695 | 79.12 |
| All People's Party | 158,549 | 20.88 | |
| Total | | 759,244 | 100.00 |
| Valid votes | | 759,244 | 97.14 |
| Invalid/blank votes | | 22,334 | 2.86 |
| Total votes | | 781,578 | 100.00 |
| Registered voters/turnout | | 1,553,303 | 50.32 |
Source: Nigeria World, IFES, Semantics Scholar
