= Emirate =

Territory governed by an emir

An emirate is a territory governed by an emir, a title used by monarchs or high officeholders in the Muslim world. From a historical point of view, an emirate is a political-religious unit smaller than a caliphate. It can be considered equivalent to a principality in non-Muslim contexts.

Currently in the world, there are three emirates that are independent states (Kuwait, Qatar, and Afghanistan), one state that consists of a federation of seven emirates (the United Arab Emirates), and one unrecognized quasi-state (the Islamic Emirate of Somalia). A great number of previously independent emirates around the world are now part of larger states.

== Etymology ==
Etymologically, emirate or amirate (Arabic: إمارة imārah, plural: إمارات imārāt) is the quality, dignity, office, or territorial competence of any emir (Arabic: أمير, romanized: amīr ; prince, commander, governor, etc.). In English, the term is pronounced /ˈɛmərət, -ɪər-, -ɪt, -eɪt/ or /ɛˈmɪərət, -ɪt, -eɪt, iˈ-/ in British English and /ˈɛmərət/ or /ɪˈmɪərət/ in American English.

== Types ==
=== Monarchies ===
The United Arab Emirates is a federal state that comprises seven federal emirates, each administered by a hereditary emir, these seven forming the electoral college for the federation's president and prime minister.

As most emirates have either disappeared, been integrated in a larger modern state, or changed their rulers' styles, e.g. to malik (Arabic for "king") or sultan, such true emirate-states have become rare.

=== Provinces ===
Furthermore, in Arabic the term can be generalized to mean any province of a country that is administered by a member of the ruling class, especially of a member (usually styled emir) of the royal family, as in Saudi Arabian governorates.

== List of present emirates ==
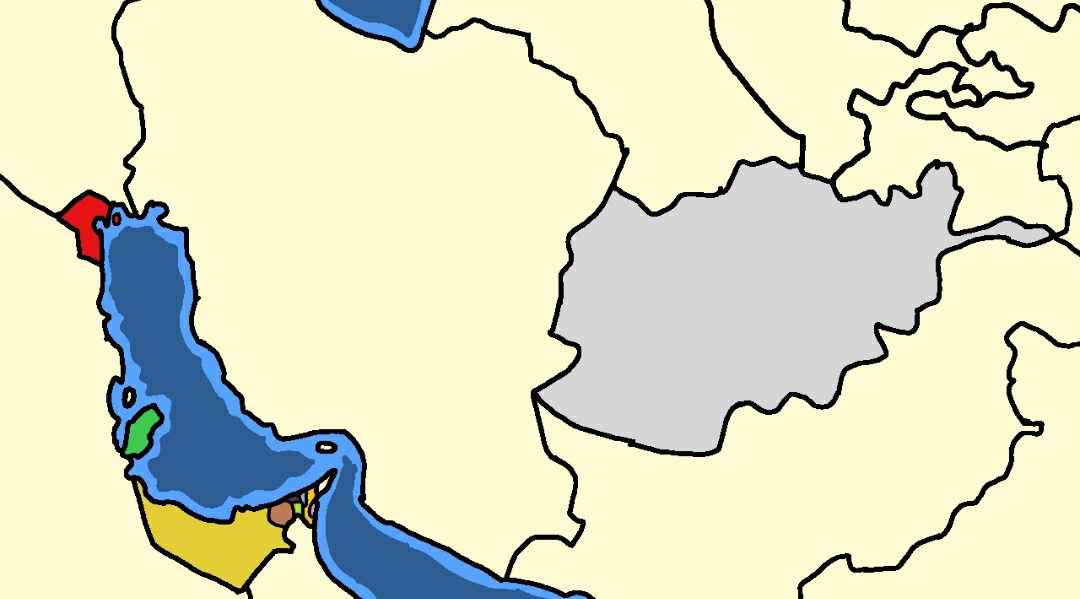
Location of Kuwait (red), Qatar (green), the United Arab Emirates (each emirate represented by its own color), and Afghanistan (grey)

Current emirates with political autonomy:

- State of Kuwait (since 19 June 1961)
- State of Qatar (since 3 September 1971)
- United Arab Emirates (since 2 December 1971)
  - Abu Dhabi (since 1 December 1971)
  - Ajman (since 1 December 1971)
  - Dubai (since 1 December 1971)
  - Fujairah (since 1 December 1971)
  - Ras al-Khaimah (since 1 December 1971)
  - Sharjah (since 1 December 1971)
  - Umm al-Quwain (since 1 December 1971)
- Islamic Emirate of Afghanistan (since 15 August 2021)

Current emirates with little to no political autonomy:

- Islamic Emirate of Somalia (since 2009)

== List of former and integrated emirates ==
These are the emirates that have either ceased to exist, are not recognized and hold no real power, or were integrated into another country and preserved as "traditional states". They are arranged by location and in order of the date of the first leader styled "emir."

=== Africa ===
==== North Africa ====
- Emirate of Nekor, Rif region of modern Morocco 710–1019
- Emirate of Ifriqiya, Aghlabid Ifriqiya within modern Tunisia, Algeria, Sicily, Morocco, and Libya 800–909
- Almoravid Emirate, modern Morocco, Mauritania, Algeria, Spain, Portugal and Gibraltar 1050s–1147
- Marinid Emirate, modern Morocco 1244–1269 (become sultanate)
- Zab Emirate, modern Algeria circa 1400 (short-lived)
- Emirate of Trarza, modern southwest Mauritania 1640s–1910s
- Emirate of Cyrenaica, modern eastern Libya 1949–1951 (became the Kingdom of Libya)
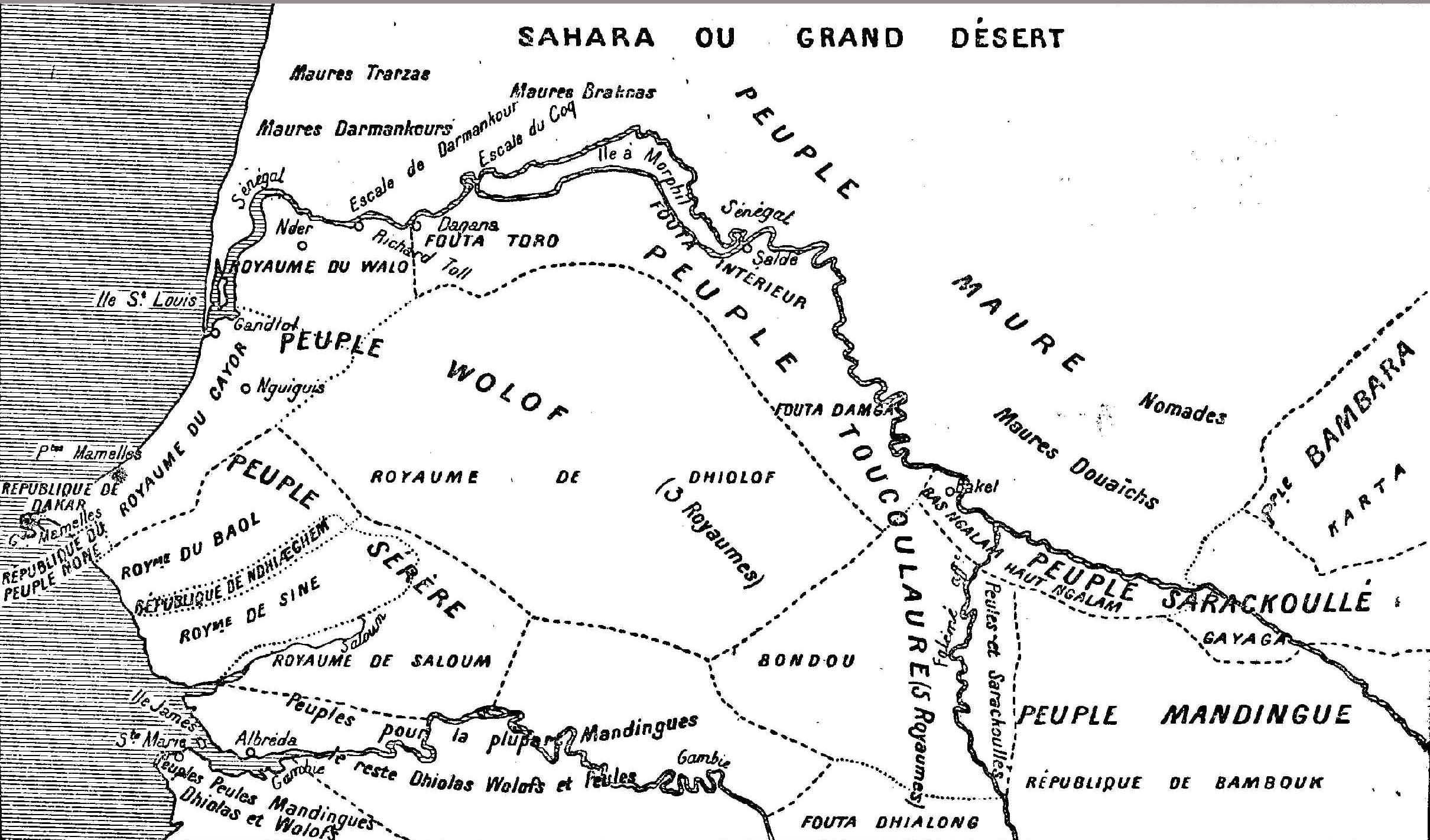
Trarza (upper left)

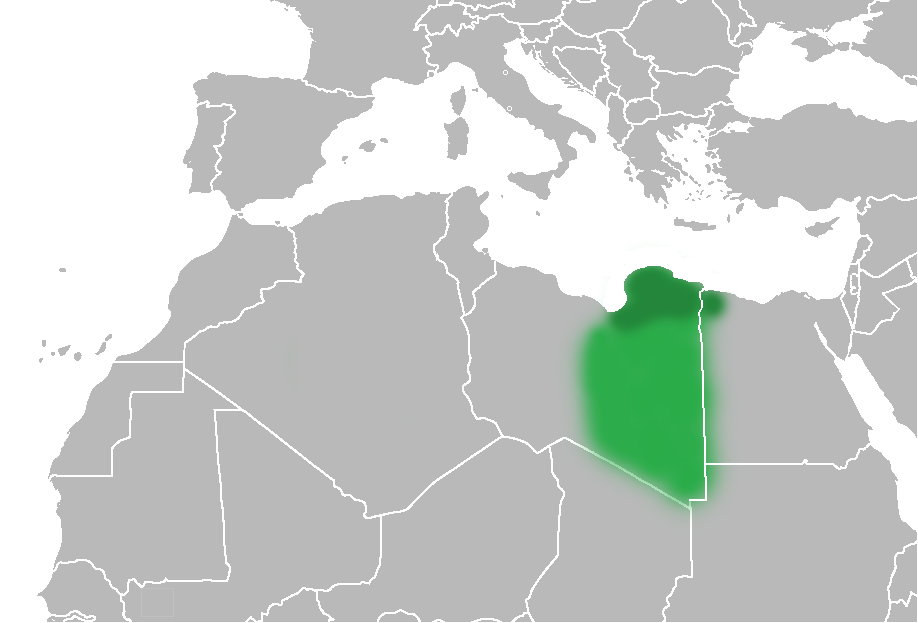
Cyrenaica in Libya

==== Sub-Saharan Africa ====
===== Ethiopia =====
- Emirate of Harar, eastern Ethiopia 1647–1887

===== Ghana =====
- Zabarma Emirate, northeastern Ghana 1860s–1897

===== Niger =====
- Emirate of Say, southwestern Niger 19th century– (integrated)

===== Nigeria =====
- Fika Emirate, northeastern Nigeria 15th century– (integrated)
- Gwandu Emirate, northwestern Nigeria 15th century to 2005 (integrated and then deposed)
- Kebbi Emirate, northwestern Nigeria 1516– (integrated)
- Borgu Emirate, west-central Nigeria, formed from Bussa Emirate 1730–1954 and Kaiama Emirate 1912–54, unified 1954– (integrated)
- Gumel Emirate, north-central Nigeria 1749– (integrated)
- Yauri Emirate, northwestern Nigeria 1799– (integrated)
- Gombe Emirate, northeast Nigeria 1804– (integrated)
- Kano Emirate, north-central Nigeria 1805– (integrated)
- Bauchi Emirate, northeast Nigeria 1805– (integrated)
- Daura Emirate, north-central Nigeria off and on 1805– (integrated)
- Katsina Emirate, north-central Nigeria 1806– (integrated)
- Katagum Emirate, north-central Nigeria 1807– (integrated)
- Zaria Emirate, north-central Nigeria 1808– (integrated)
- Potiskum Emirate, northeastern Nigeria 1809– (integrated)
- Adamawa Emirate, eastern Nigeria and formerly into western Cameroon 1809– (integrated where preserved)
- Ilorin Emirate, southwestern Nigeria 1817– (integrated)
- Muri Emirate, east-central Nigeria 1817– (integrated)
- Kazaure Emirate, north-central Nigeria 1819– (integrated)
- Lapai Emirate, central Nigeria 1825– (integrated)
- Suleja Emirate, central Nigeria 1828– (integrated)
- Agaie Emirate, west-central Nigeria 1832– (integrated)
- Bida Emirate, west-central Nigeria 1856– (integrated)
- Kontagora Emirate, north-central Nigeria 1858– (integrated)
- Borno Emirate, northeastern Nigeria 1900– (integrated)
- Dikwa Emirate, northeast Nigeria 1901– (integrated)
- Biu Emirate, northeast Nigeria 1920– (integrated)

=== Asia ===
==== Arabia ====
- Emirate of Mecca, Western Arabia 967–1916
- Uyunid Emirate, the modern Arabian Peninsula 1076–1253
- Jabrids Emirate, Eastern and center Arabia 1417–1524
- Emirate of Al-Uyaynah central Arabia 1446–1760
- Bani Khalid Emirate, Eastern Arabia 1669–1796
- Emirate of Beihan, modern southern Yemen 1680–1967
- Emirate of Diriyah, mainly in modern Saudi Arabia and the UAE 1727–1818
- Emirate of Nejd, center and eastern Arabia 1818–91
- Emirate of Dhala, modern southern Yemen early 19th century to 1967
- Emirate of Jabal Shammar, northcentral Arabia 1836–1921
- Emirate of Nejd and Hasa, central Arabia 1902–21
- Idrisid Emirate of Asir, Jizan in modern southwestern Saudi Arabia 1906–34
- Emirate of Bahrain, 1971–2002 (before it was under a hakim (ruler); after under a malik (king))
- Emirates of Saudi Arabia, the thirteen provinces of Saudi Arabia
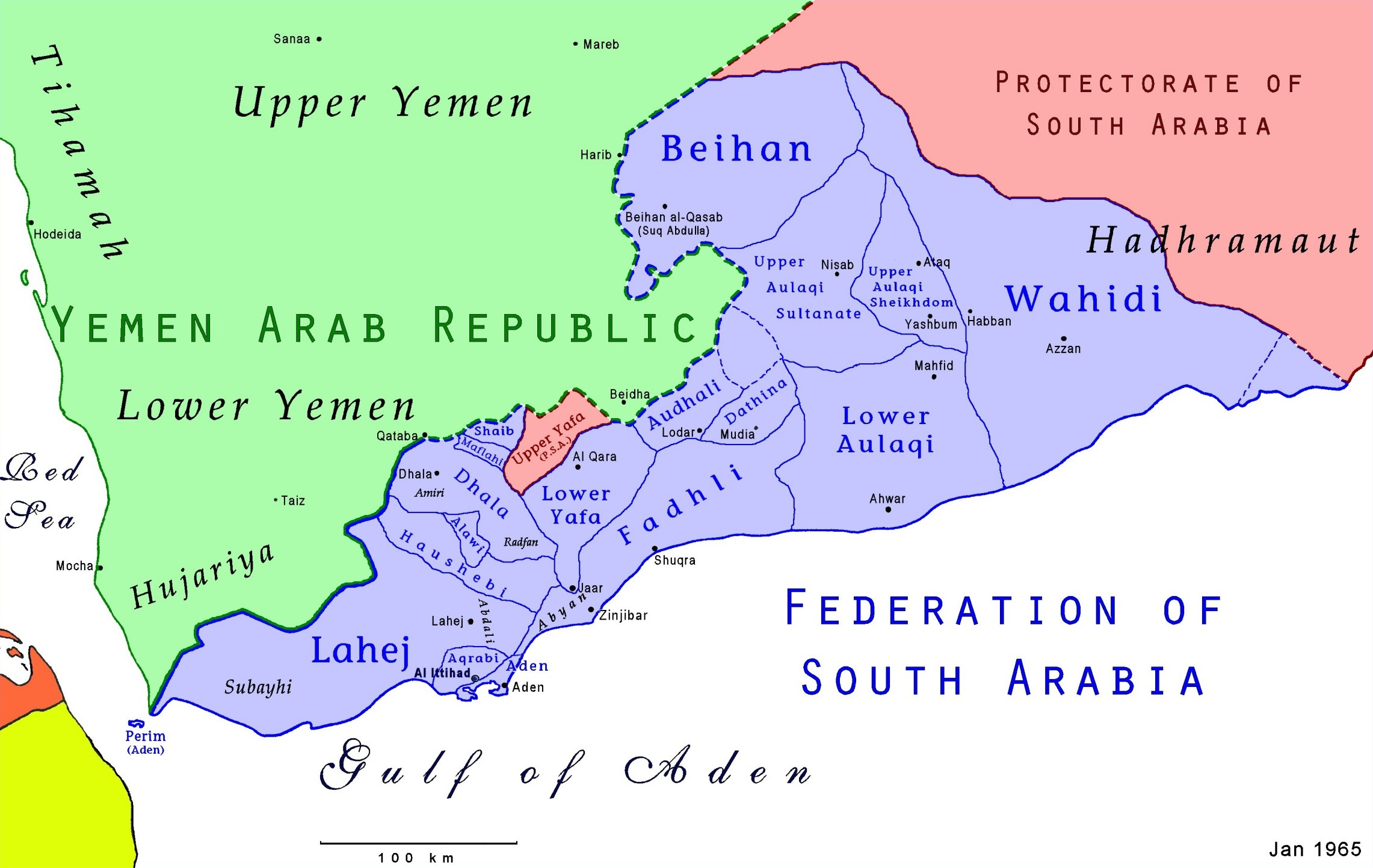
Beihan and Dhala in South Arabia

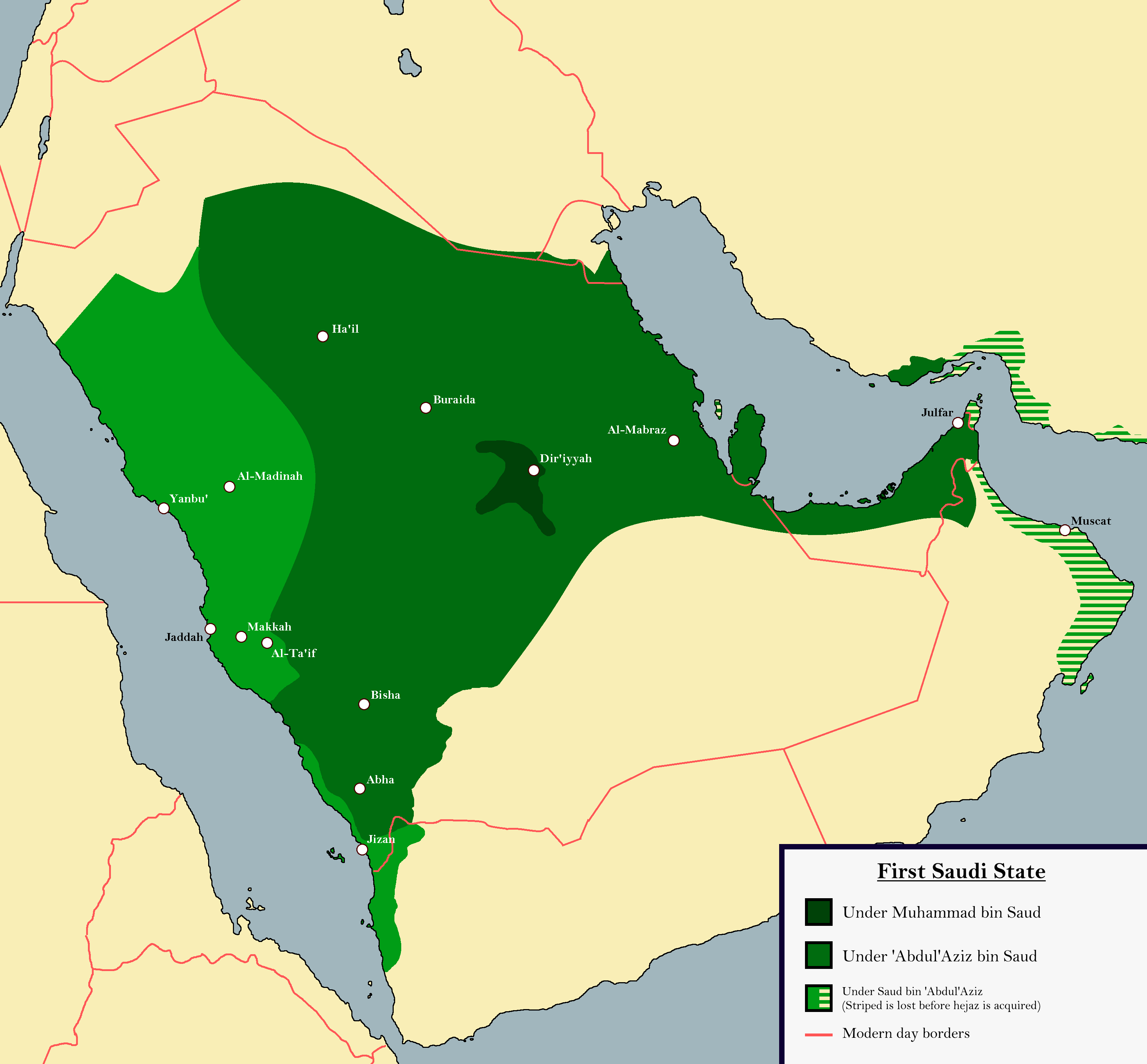
Diriyah

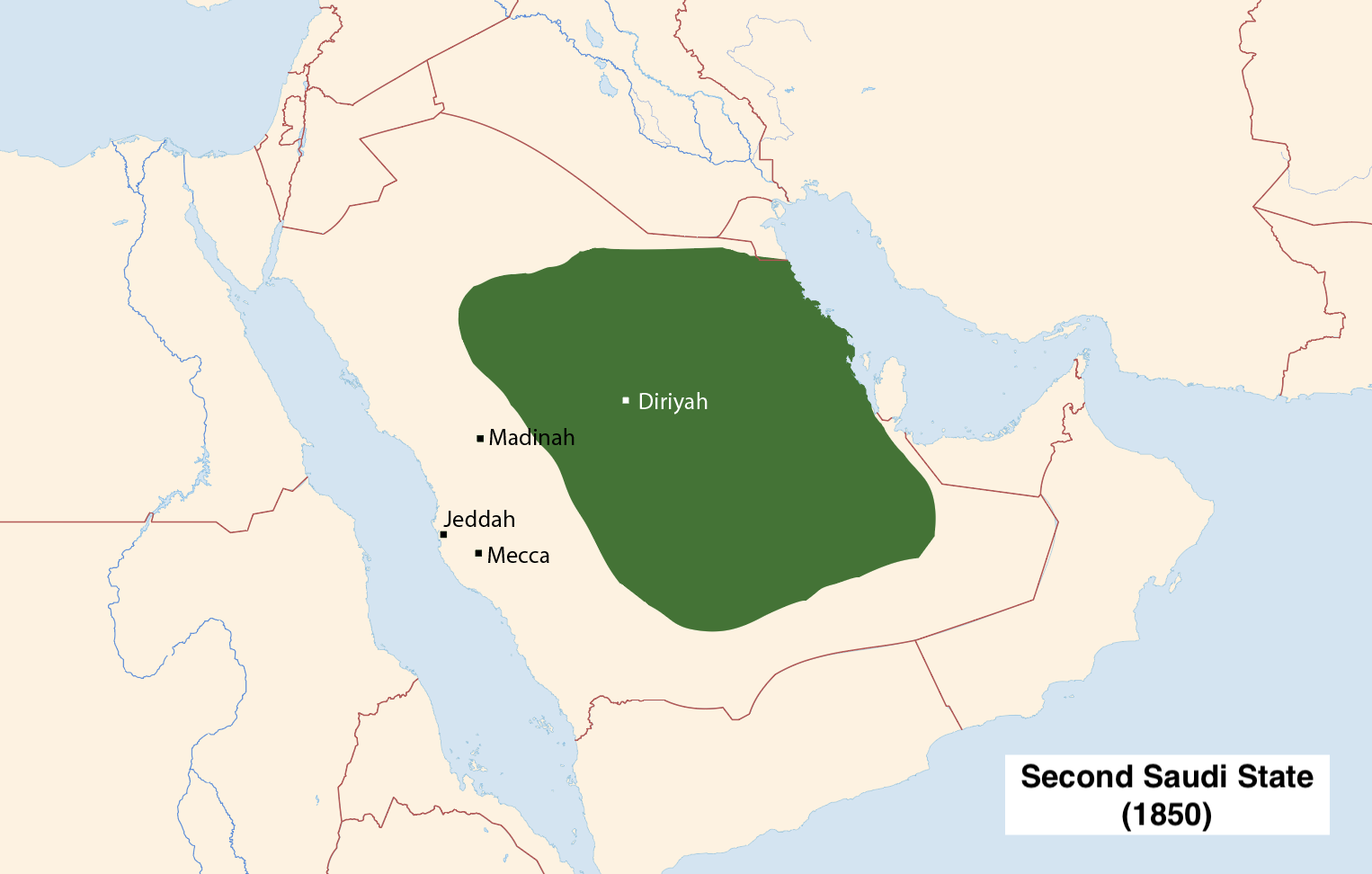
Nejd

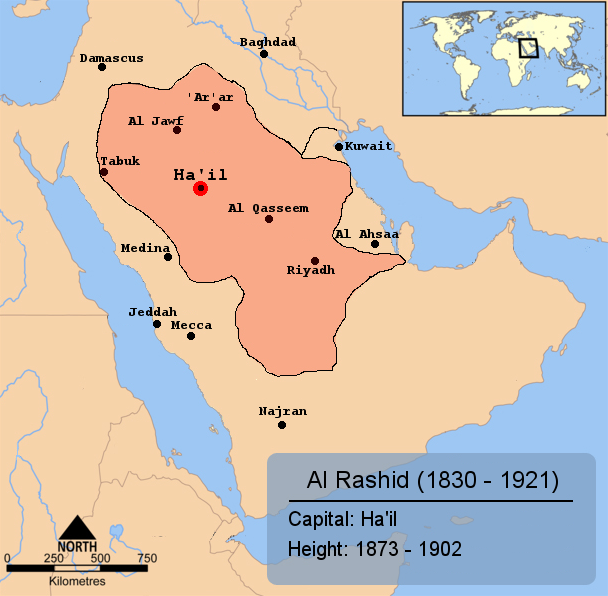
Jabal Shammar

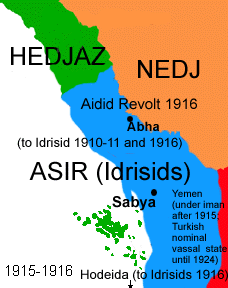
Asir at its height

Bahrain

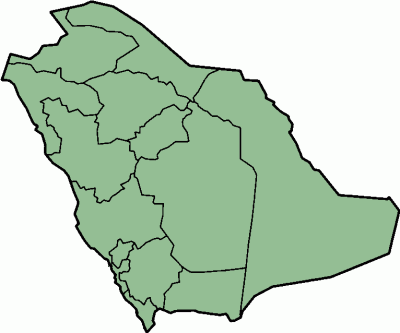
Saudi Arabian emirate divisions

==== Central Asia ====
- Emirate of Bukhara, modern Uzbekistan 1785–1920
- Khotan Emirate, 1933 northwest China, merged into First East Turkestan Republic
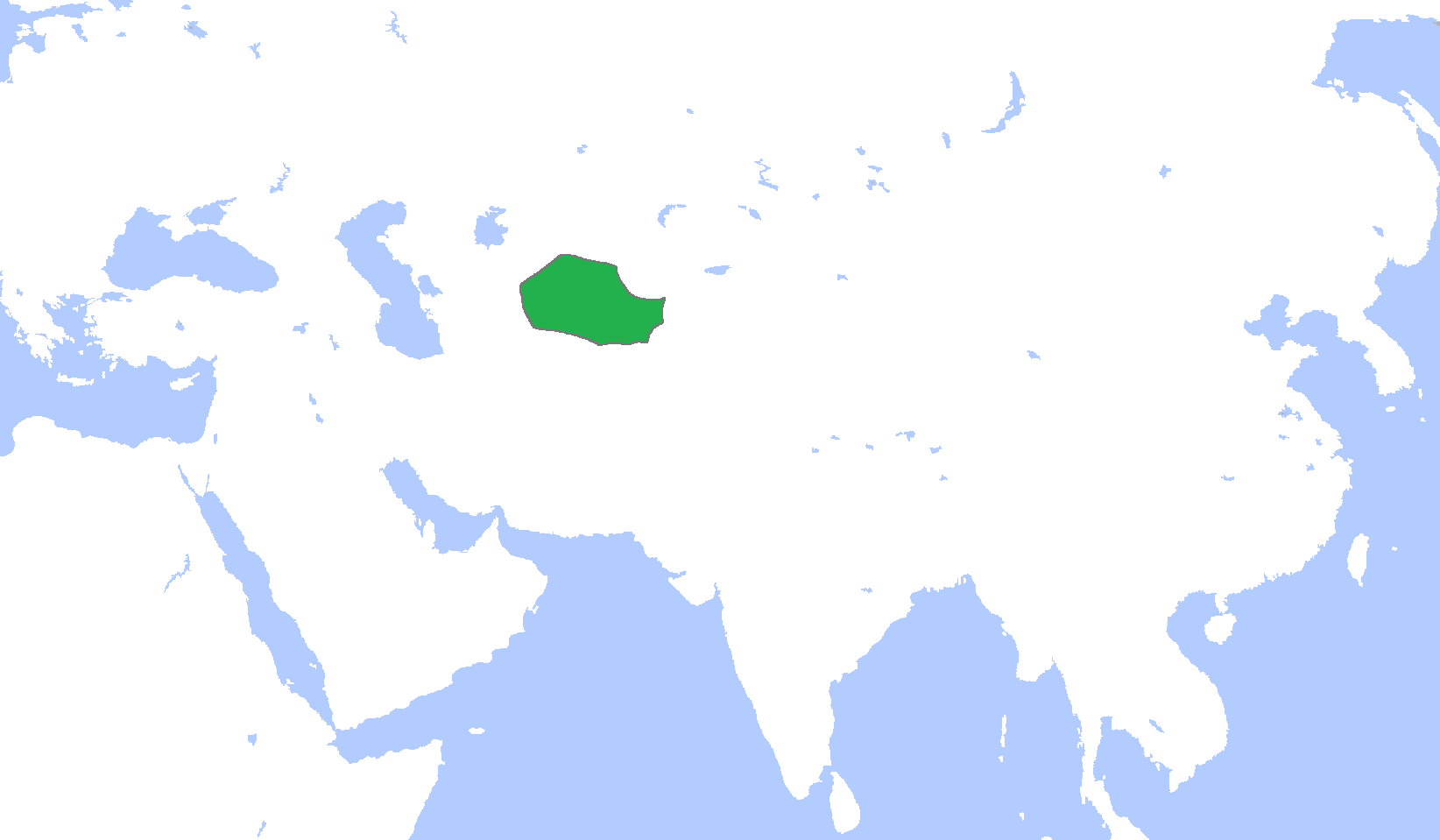
Bukhara

Khotan in modern China

==== South Asia ====
- Emirate of Afghanistan, Afghanistan 1823–1929
- Islamic Emirate of Afghanistan (1996–2001), first period of Taliban rule in Afghanistan (overthrown)
- Islamic Emirate of Kunar, southern Afghanistan 1991–1991
- Emirate of Multan
- Habbarid Emirate
Emirate of Afghanistan

==== Near East ====
- Emirate of Mosul (see list of emirs for more), modern Iraq 905–1096, 1127–1222, 1254–1383, 1758–1918
- Emirate of Melitene, modern central Turkey mid-ninth century to 934
- Emirate of Amida, modern Eastern Turkey 983–1085
- Karaman Emirate, south-central Anatolia 1250–1487
- Emirate of Aydin, state composed of Oghuz Turks in modern Turkey from the early 14th century to 1390
- Emirate of Dulkadir, modern Turkey 1337–1522
- Emirate of Erzincan, 14–15th centuries
- Emirate of Ramazan, modern Turkey 1352–1608
- Emirate of Mount Lebanon, modern Lebanon 1516–1842
- Timurid Emirates, Timur's empire and the minor emirates left behind after the fall of the Timurid dynasty in the Middle East, 1526-c.1550
- Soran Emirate, modern northern Iraq 1816–35
- Az Zubayr, town in Basra Governorate, Iraq during 16th century
- Emirate of Transjordan, modern Jordan 1921–46
- Islamic Emirate of Byara, modern Kurdistan Region, Iraq, 2001–2003
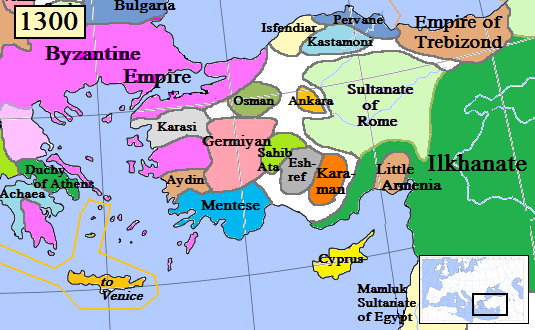
Ottoman emirate in 1300, labeled 'Osman'

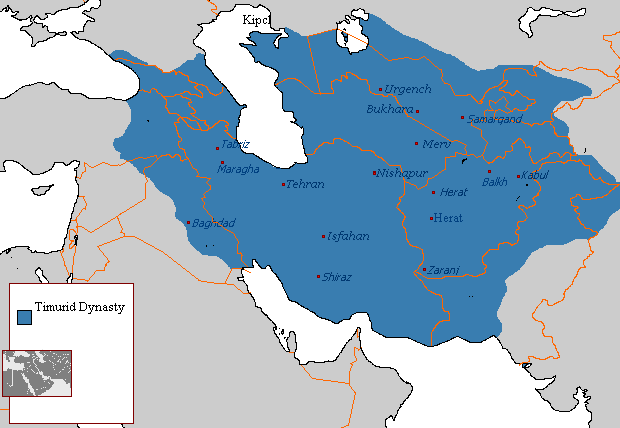
Timurid Emirate under the leadership of Timur

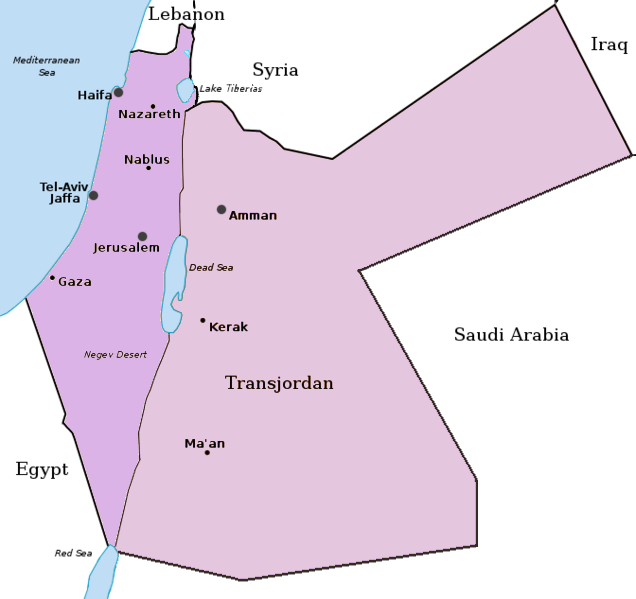
Transjordan

=== Europe ===
==== Caucasus ====
- Emirate of Armenia, Caucasus 637–884
- Emirate of Darband, Dagestan 869–1075
- Emirate of Tbilisi, modern Georgia 736–1080, nominally to 1122
- North Caucasian Emirate, Chechnya and Dagestan in the Caucasus 1919–1920
- Caucasus Emirate, Caucasus 2007–2017 (unrecognized)
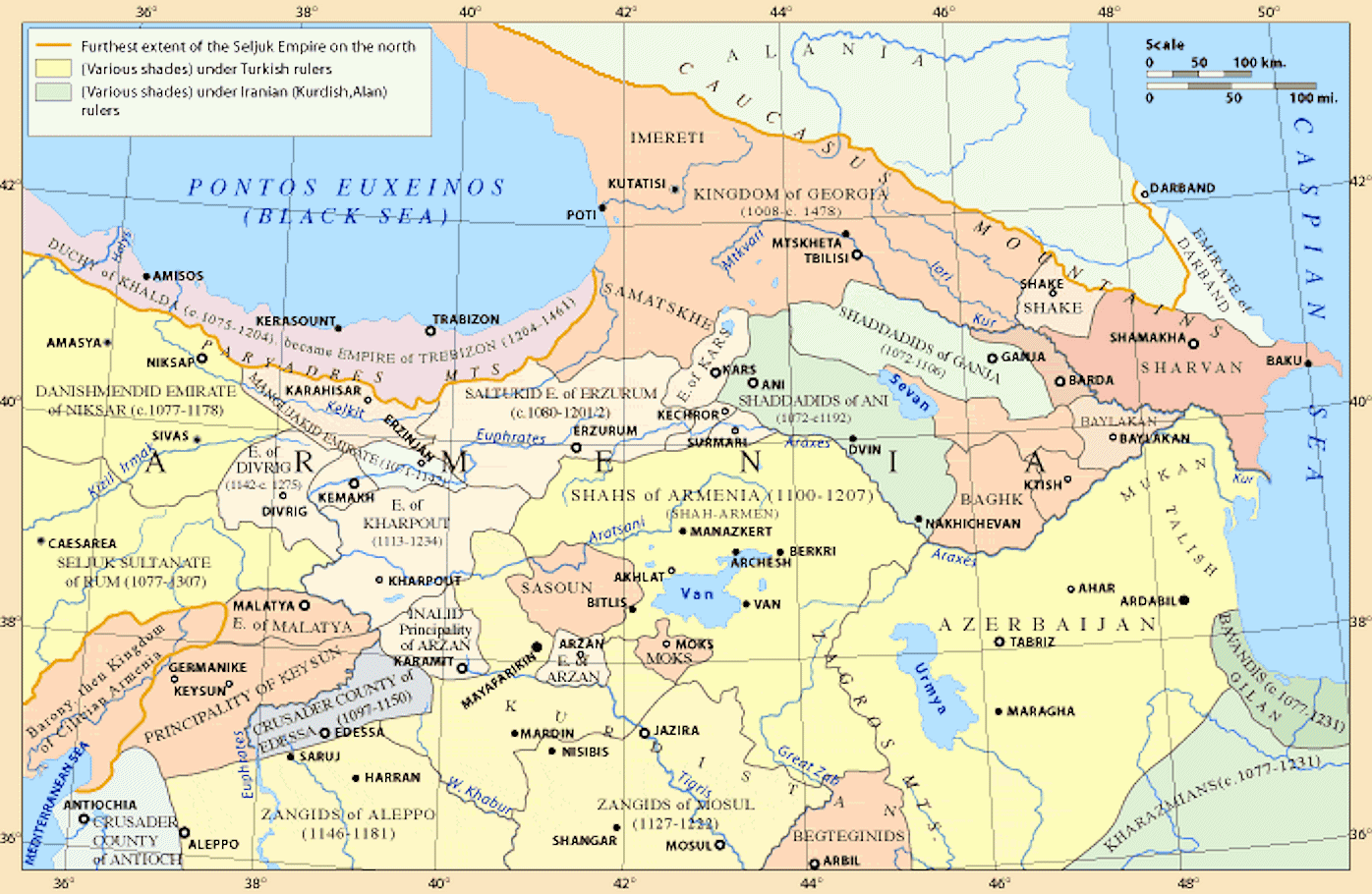
Darband, Azerbaijan

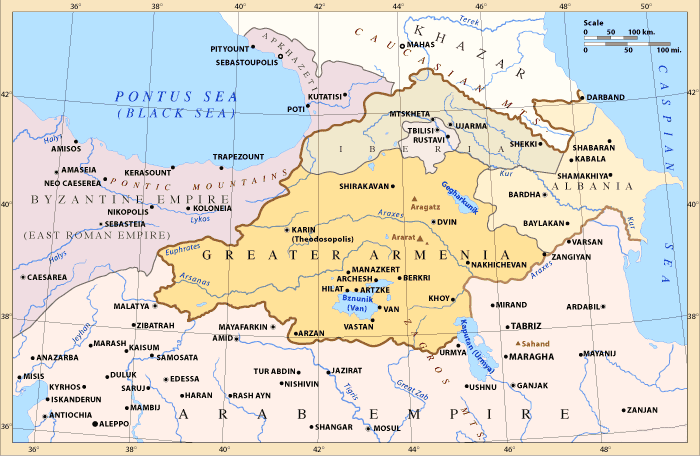
Armenia

==== Iberia ====
- Emirate of Córdoba, modern Spain and Portugal 756–929 (title changed to caliph in 929)
- Emirate of Badajoz, modern Portugal and western Spain 1009–1151
- Emirate of Almería, region of Almería and Cartagena in modern Spain off and on 1013–1091
- Emirate of Jerez, towns of Jerez de la Frontera and Arcos de la Frontera in modern southern Spain 1145–1147
- Emirate of Granada, modern southern Spain 1228–1492
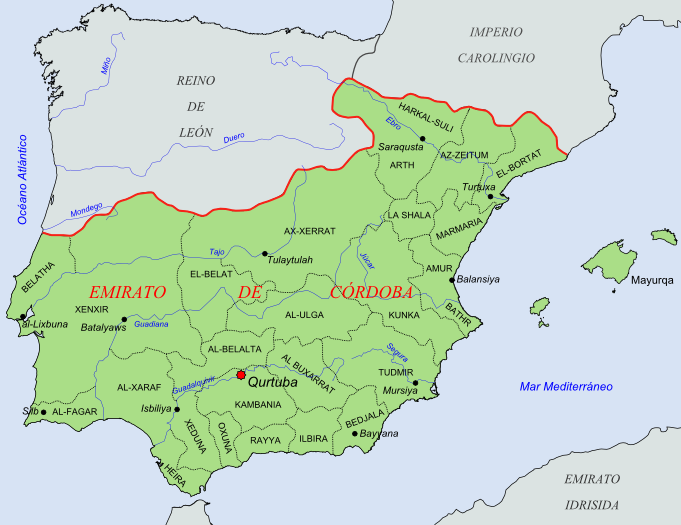
Córdoba

Badajoz

Granada

==== Mediterranean region ====
- Emirate of Crete, Crete, modern Greece, 824 or 827/828 to 961
- Emirate of Bari, city of Bari in southern Italy 847–871
- Emirate of Malta, 870–1091
- Emirate of Sicily, Sicily 965–1072
- Emirate of Qatansáar, city of Catanzaro in southern Italy 903-1050
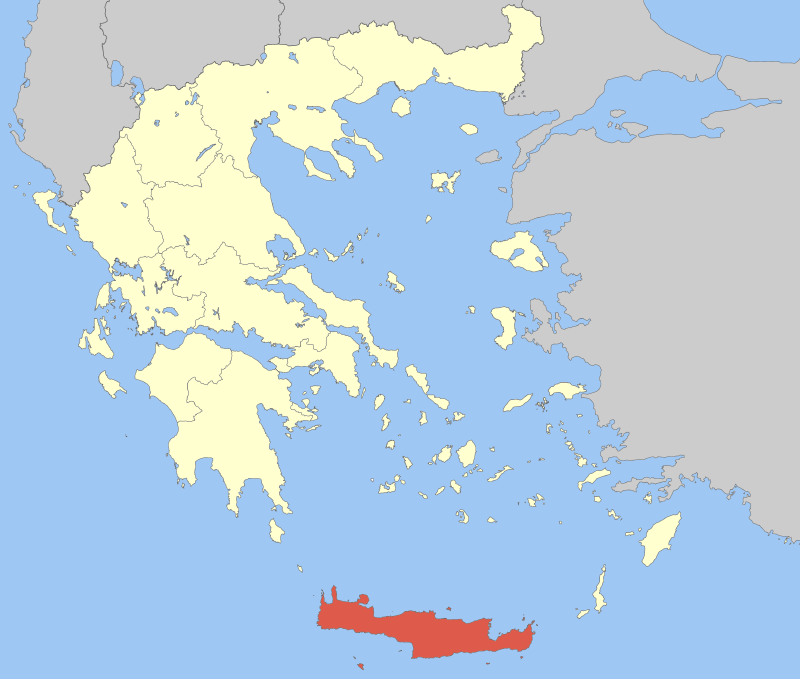
Crete within modern Greece

Sicily (at bottom)

== See also ==
- Caliphate
- Sultanate
- Khanate
- Principality
- Duchy
