= Komta language =

Extinct language of Nigeria

Komta
- Native to: Nigeria
- Region: Kaltungo Peak
- Ethnicity: Komta people
- Extinct: early 20th century?
- Language family: unclassified

Language codes
- ISO 639-3: None (mis)
- Glottolog: komt1237

Komta is an extinct unclassified language spoken in what is now Gombe State, northeastern Nigeria.

== History of study ==
Ulrich Kleinewillinghöfer, when investigating the Jalaa language of Nigeria, inquired into the several previous peoples of the area that had, like the Jalaa, been absorbed by newcomers within living memory. One of these was the Komta. He says,

"The Komta people were dispelled and/or eradicated by the Tangale upon their arrival in the area around Kaltungo Peak. The list [below] was scribbled on a piece of paper and given to me in 2003 by an elderly Tangale working at the time in Maiduguri ... He explained that this is how his (Tangale) grandfather said the Komta counted."

== Data ==
Given the time elapsed and the lack of a direct witness, it can only be said that the following numerals are alleged to be Komta.

1 pampe
2 natgana
3 titana
4 titanu
5 notgoru
6 borganje
7 gaje
8 yakana
9 yawo (yarwo?)
10 mat
