= S'Nabou =

African interpreter

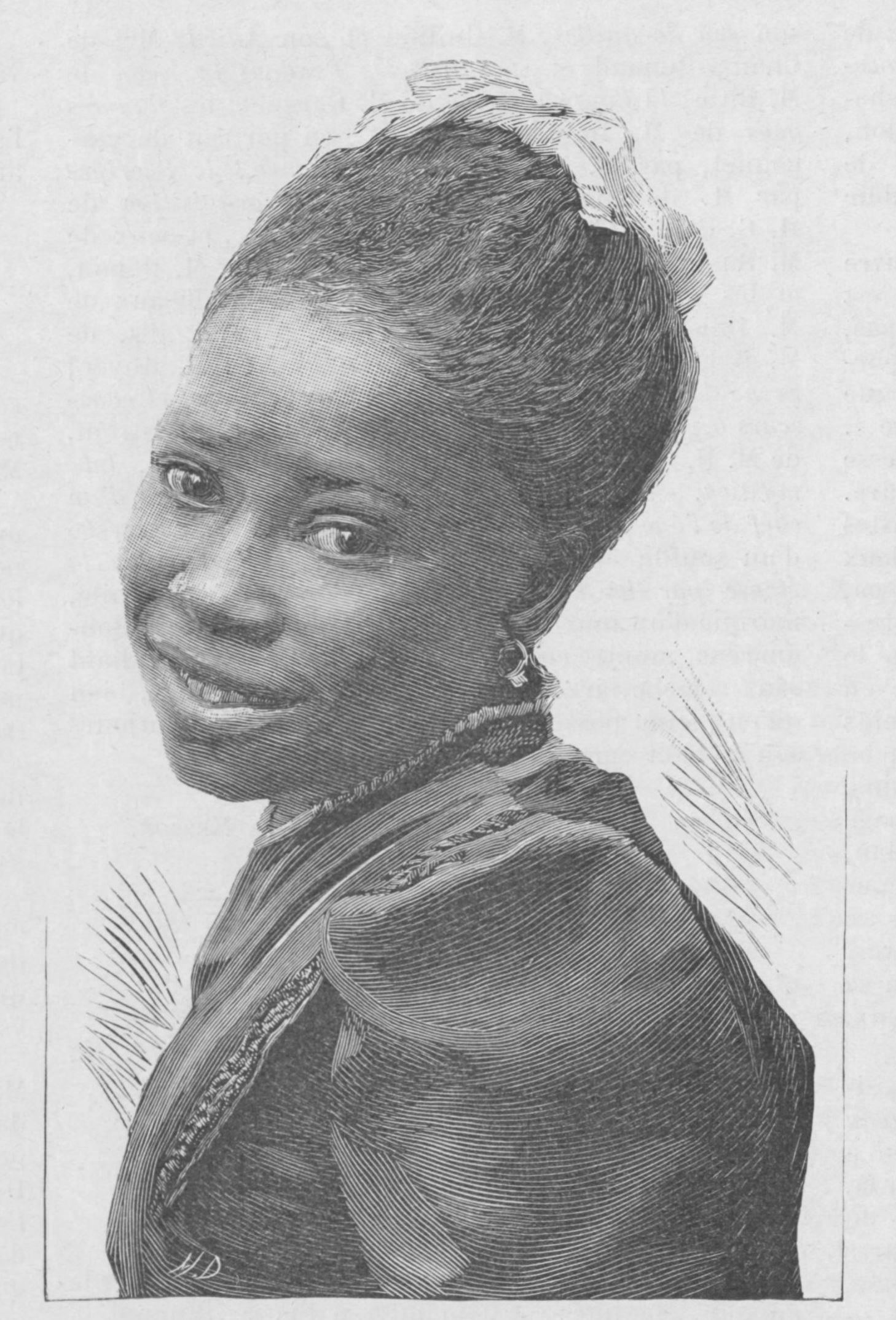
S'Nabou in Le Monde illustré, 2 July 1892

Alima S'Nabou (born c. 1880) was an African interpreter (from modern day Nigeria) who accompanied a French explorer named Lieutenant Mizon.

== Biography ==
Alima S'Nabou was born to a chief, Konanki, in the village of Igbobé, near Lokodja located at the confluence of the Benoue and Niger rivers. She spoke and understood French, English, and other languages of the Niger Basin. S'Nabou was in Assaba, a location about 200 kilometres from her native village at age 10 or 11 when she met Mizon and her mother recommended that she accompany Mizon's mission to Lokodja so she could see her father, as Mizon was en route to Lokodja to see the developments there. At Lokodja, S'Nabou informed her father and grandmother that she would accompany Mizon on his expedition to Yola, the capital of Adamoua. The goal of the expedition was to connect the French posts in Yola to the Congo and to ensure separation of the German and French colonies by preventing the inward expansion of the German colony of Cameroon.

S'Nabou assisted by communicating the feelings of the Sudanese people and proved to be useful in Mizon's quest of going up the river Niger in a steam boat. She also assisted in the recruitment of another member of the exploration team.

She was celebrated alongside Mizon and "his two Arabs" at the Paris Hotel de Ville by the Municipal Council upon their arrival in Paris in April 1892. Her portrait, Mademoiselle S'Nabou, was painted in 1892 by Adolphe Yvon and is held in the Musée Carnavalet in Paris. Le Monde illustré published an article about her, naming her as Sanabou, which said that she was "en passe de devenir une celebrité Parisienne" ("on the way to becoming a Parisian celebrity").

It was later stated that she was the niece of a pilot of the Niger Company who was bought as a slave.

In September 1893, Mizon and his entourage left Yola on his boat and "dropped S'Nabou at the Catholic mission at Onitsha where she gave birth to a boy of light complexion".

== Gallery ==
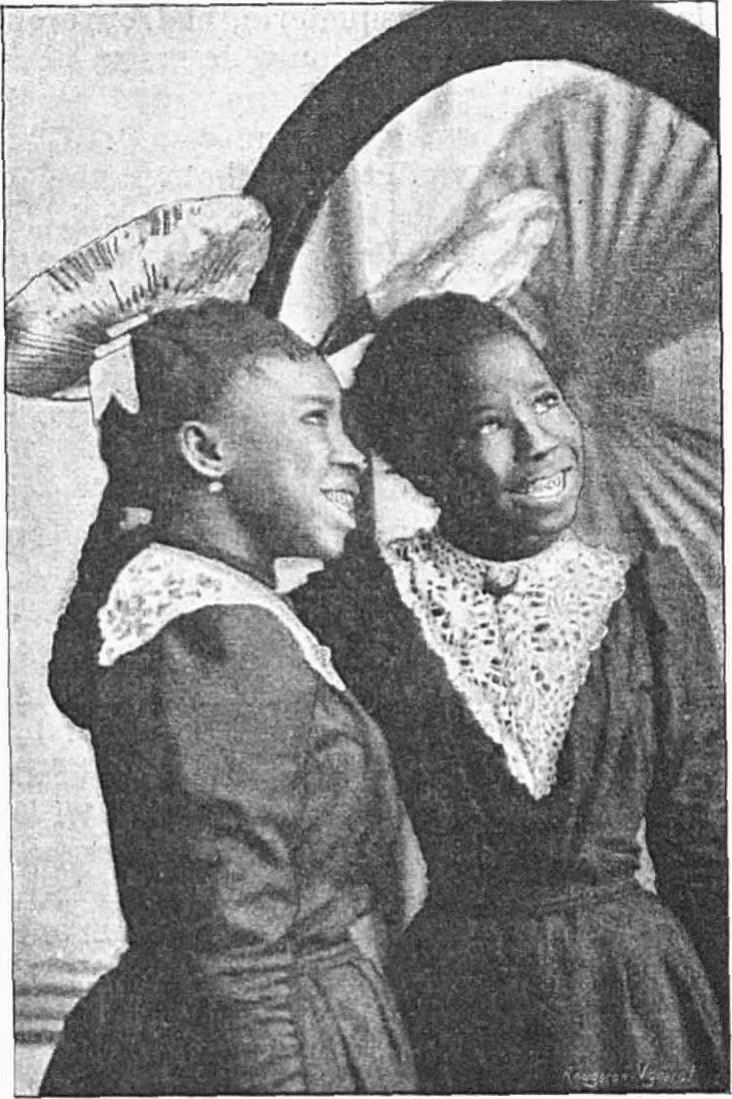
S'Nabou devant un miroir (phot. Ladrey-Disdéri)

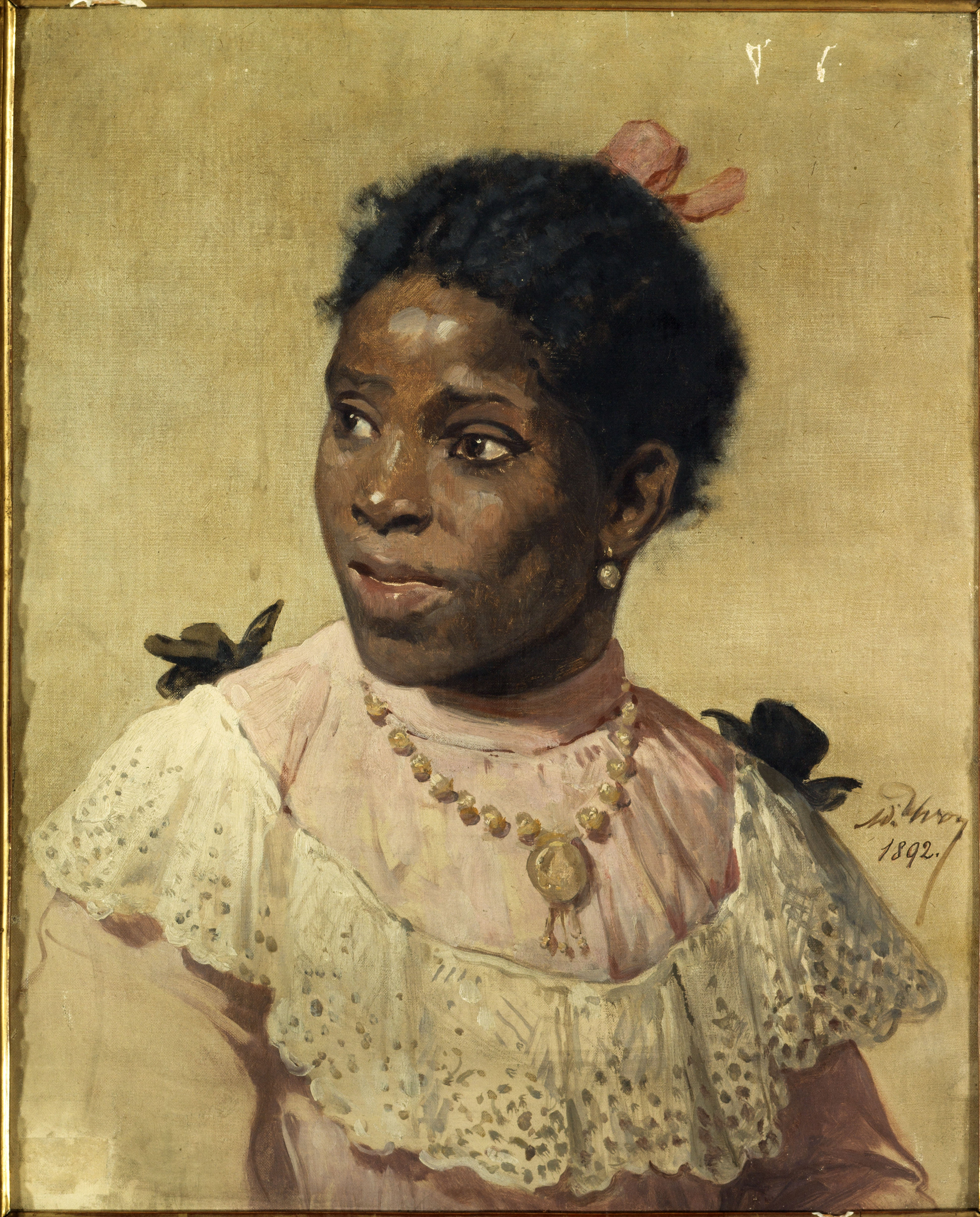
Mademoiselle S'Nabou (Adolphe Yvon, 1892)

Alima S'Nabou, son père Akouani et sa grand'mère Éliah, 1894
