= Muhammadu Kudu Abubakar =

Ruler of Agaie in Niger, Nigeria (died 2014)

Muhammadu Kudu Abubakar Ubandoma III, Emir of Agaie (died 30 March 2014) was appointed Etsu (Ruler) of the Agaie Emirate, a traditional state based in Agaie in Niger State, Nigeria on 30 April 2004.

Abubakar, who was 42 when appointed Emir, is the son of the 10th Emir of Agaie, Alhaji Abdullahi Bello Ubandoma. He earned a Higher Diploma in Animal Health and Husbandry and a Postgraduate Diploma in Public Administration from Ahmadu Bello University, Zaria. He is grand patron of the Nuhu Lafarma (Education) Foundation, which promotes improved education in the Agaie Emirate.

He is one of the promoters of formation of a new Edu State from parts of the current Niger and Kwara states as a homeland for the Nupe people, with capital at Bida.

The movement is led by the Emir of Bida, Abubakar Yahaya, and is also supported by the Etsu Lapai, Umar Baogo III.

In January 2010 Abubakar conferred the honorary title of "Badakoshin Agaie" on the Niger State governor Muazu Babangida Aliyu.

In July 2010 he was attacked in Agaie by an angry mob who accused him of siding with the police after local people had tried to prevent police from pursuing suspected criminals. In the ensuing violence one person was killed, and later the mob carried his body to the Etsu's palace.

Abubakar died on 30 March 2014 after protracted illness in Abuja hospital.
