= Lapai =

- LGA and town
- Interactive map of Lapai
- Location in Nigeria
- Coordinates: 8°49′N 6°41′E
- Country: Nigeria
- State: Niger State

Government
  - Local Government Chairman and the Head of the Local Government Council: Mohammed Musa Kirikpo
  - Hon.: Umaru Bago Tafida

Area
  - Total: 3,051 km^{2} (1,178 sq mi)

Population (2006 census)
  - Total: 110,127
  - Density: 36.10/km^{2} (93.49/sq mi)
- Time zone: UTC+1 (WAT)
- 3-digit postal code prefix: 911
- ISO 3166 code: NG.NI.LP

Lapai is a town and Local Government Area in Niger State, Nigeria, adjoining the Federal Capital Territory. It is located on the A124 highway.

The LGA has an area of 3,051 km^{2} and a population of 110,127 at the 2006 census. The area is roughly coterminous with the Lapai Emirate.

The postal code of the area is 911. Lapai is traditionally inhabited by the Muslim Nupe People.

== Climate/Geography ==
Throughout the year, the area's temperature varies, ranging from 62 °F to 94 °F, with sporadic excursions below 56 °F or above 101 °F.

== Economy ==
In Lapai LGA, people cultivate a variety of crops, including rice, millet, yam, sorghum, groundnuts, and shea nuts. The LGA has a number of marketplaces where a wide range of goods are bought and sold, which contributes to the region's thriving trade. The residents of Lapai LGA also engage in significant economic activities such as leatherworking, blacksmithing, and hunting.

In Lapai, agriculture plays a significant role in the local economy. For many locals, farming is their main source of income. Crops including millet, sorghum, maize, and vegetables can be grown in the fertile soil.

The neighbouring areas also engage in livestock rearing, especially with regard to cattle.

Lapai has a number of cultural festivals that highlight its people's traditions and customs. Communities come together for vibrant displays of traditional music, dances, arts, and crafts during festivals like Nupe Day and Gwari Day. These gatherings give the area's cultural heritage a stage for promotion and preservation.
