= Cletus Komena Emein =

Former administrator of Niger State

Administrator of Niger State
- In office 9 Dec 1993 – 22 Aug 1996
- Preceded by: Musa Inuwa
- Succeeded by: Simeon Oduoye

Personal details
- Born: 1948 (age 77–78)

Cletus Komena Emein was Governor of Niger State in Nigeria from 9 Dec 1993 to 22 Aug 1996. He became a member of the Niger Delta Committee, tasked with solving the endemic violence in the oil-producing region, in September 2008.

== Niger State governor ==
As governor of Niger State he was noted for going to work without a security guard. In 1994 he dethroned Etsu Muhammadu Attahiru of the Agaie Emirate due to allegations that he had murdered Alhaji Ibrahim Tsadu, Chairman of the Agaie Local Government Area. Attahiru was later cleared of the allegation. He retired with the rank of Brigadier-General.

== Subsequent career ==
Cletus Emein became chairman of Reach Engineering & Diving Services, a company involved in maintenance of offshore oil rigs.

In October 2004, Cletus Emein and other Ijaw leaders asked a visiting delegation from the British government to advise the Shell Petroleum Development Company to avoid trouble in the region by ceasing to take undue advantage of the people of the Niger Delta. In April 2005 Cletus Emein called on the Federal Government to ensure that oil companies operating in the Niger Delta comply with their legal obligations to the communities in the region, imposing severe penalties for non-compliance.

Speaking about a Niger Delta stakeholders conference called by President Olusegun Obasanjo in April 2006, General Cletus Emein said he was not against dialogue. However, the Federal Government must already know that the people of the Niger-Delta, particularly the Ijaw, were being grossly marginalized. In May 2008, speaking as a member and advisor on Peace and Security of the Izon Council of Elders in Delta State, Cletus Emein called for restraint by both the militants and the Joint Military Task Force to avoid causing further harm to Ijaw communities in the area. He called on the Federal Government to set up a panel to determine the cause of the recent crisis and recommend how to avoid a repeat. In September 2008 Delta State Governor Emmanuel Uduaghan nominated General Cletus Emein to the Niger Delta committee as a representative of the Ijaw ethnic group.
