= Garba Ali Mohammed =

Administrator of Niger State
- In office 1986 – December 1987
- Preceded by: David Mark
- Succeeded by: Lawan Gwadabe

Personal details
- Born: 12 April 1949 (age 77) Zaria, Kaduna State, Nigeria

Garba Ali Mohammed was Military Administrator of Niger State in Nigeria from 1986 to December 1987 during the military regime of General Ibrahim Babangida.

Garba Mohammed was born on 13 April 1949 in Zaria, Kaduna State. He studied at the Nigerian Defence Academy, Kaduna, at Ahmadu Bello University, Zaria and at the Engineers' School, Fort Belvoir, USA. He qualified as a quantity surveyor. Lt. Col. G.A. Mohammed was Military Administrator of Niger State in Nigeria from 1986 to December 1987 during the military regime of General Ibrahim Babangida.

Brigadier General Garba Mohammed was appointed member / secretary of the National Economic Intelligence Committee when it was established on 17 February 1994. He was appointed Minister of Works and Housing in December 1997. He was confirmed in this position on 22 August 1998, after a cabinet reshuffle in the interim government of General Abdulsalam Abubakar.

In January 2006 he chaired the 3rd Media Trust Annual Dialogue in Abuja. In November 2008, as National Vice President of the Nigerian Chamber of Commerce, Industry, Mines and Agriculture, he was a member of a delegation that visited Lebanon to explore investment opportunities.
