= Abbas Njidda Tafida =

- Emir of Muri Alhaji Abbas Njidda Tafida
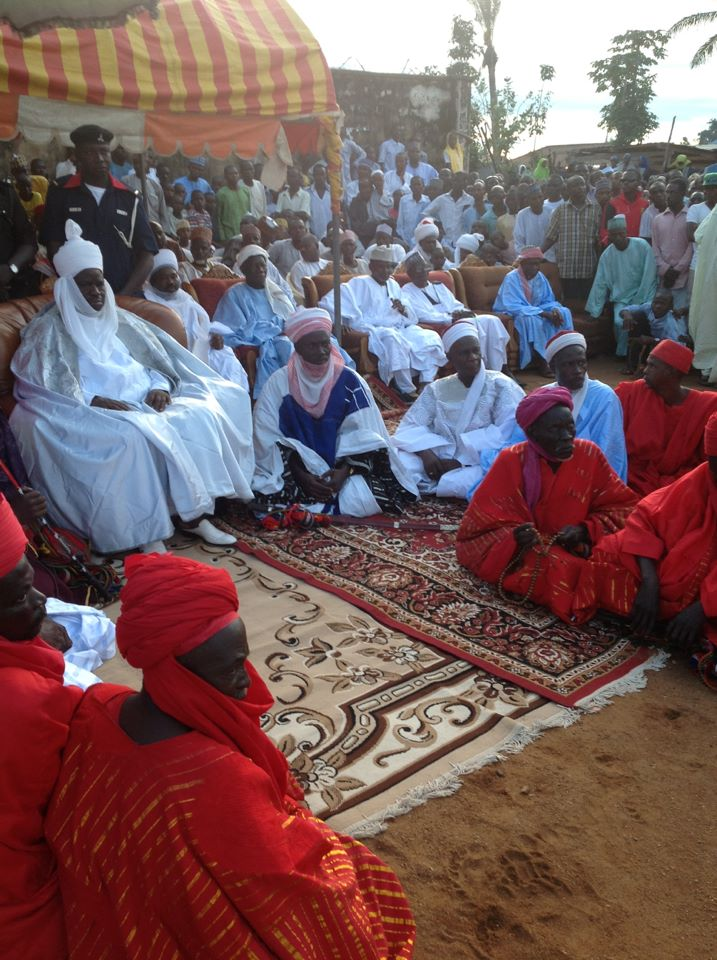

Emir of Muri
- Reign: 1988 - date
- Coronation: 12 July 1988
- Predecessor: Alhaji Umaru Abba Tukur
- Born: 10 June 1953; Jalingo, Taraba State, Nigeria
- Father: Njidda Tafida
- Religion: Islam
- Occupation: Entrepreneur

Alhaji Abbas Njidda Tafida (10 June 1953) is the Emir of Muri in Jalingo Taraba state, Nigeria. As 12th Emir of Muri, he ascended to the throne on 12 July 1988 after the dethronement of Alhaji Umaru Abba Tukur.

== Early life ==
Alhaji Abbas Njidda Tafida was born on 10 June 1953 in Jalingo, Taraba State of Nigeria. He was from the family of Lamiɗo Nya Jatau, the founder of Jalingo, and the grandchild of Lamiɗo Mafinɗi, the 9th Emir of the Emirate.

== Education ==
Alhaji Abbas attended Islamic school and Qur'anic school before beginning western education. Alhaji Abbas started primary school at Muhammadu Nya primary school in Taraba State in 1961. He later proceeded to Government College Keffi of Nassarawa State, in 1973, and moved to the famous Ahmadu Bello University Zaria, Kaduna state where he studied business administration in 1977. In 1981-1983, he obtained his PGD at Africa Development Bank, at which he studied economics and Green Beheld Smith and Co., in London.

== Work ==
Alhaji Abbas Njidda Tafida is an entrepreneur and farmer. Alhaji Abbas also worked with New Nigeria Development Company (NNDC) from 1978-1979, also a manager at Nigeria Hotels in 1979–1988.
