= Mohammadu =

Mohammadu is a given name. Notable people with the name include:

- Mohammadu Fasal (born 1990), Sri Lankan footballer
- Mohammadu Salisu (1934–?), Ghanaian footballer

== See also ==
- Muhammadu
