= Antoine Mizon =

French Navy officer & colonial administrator

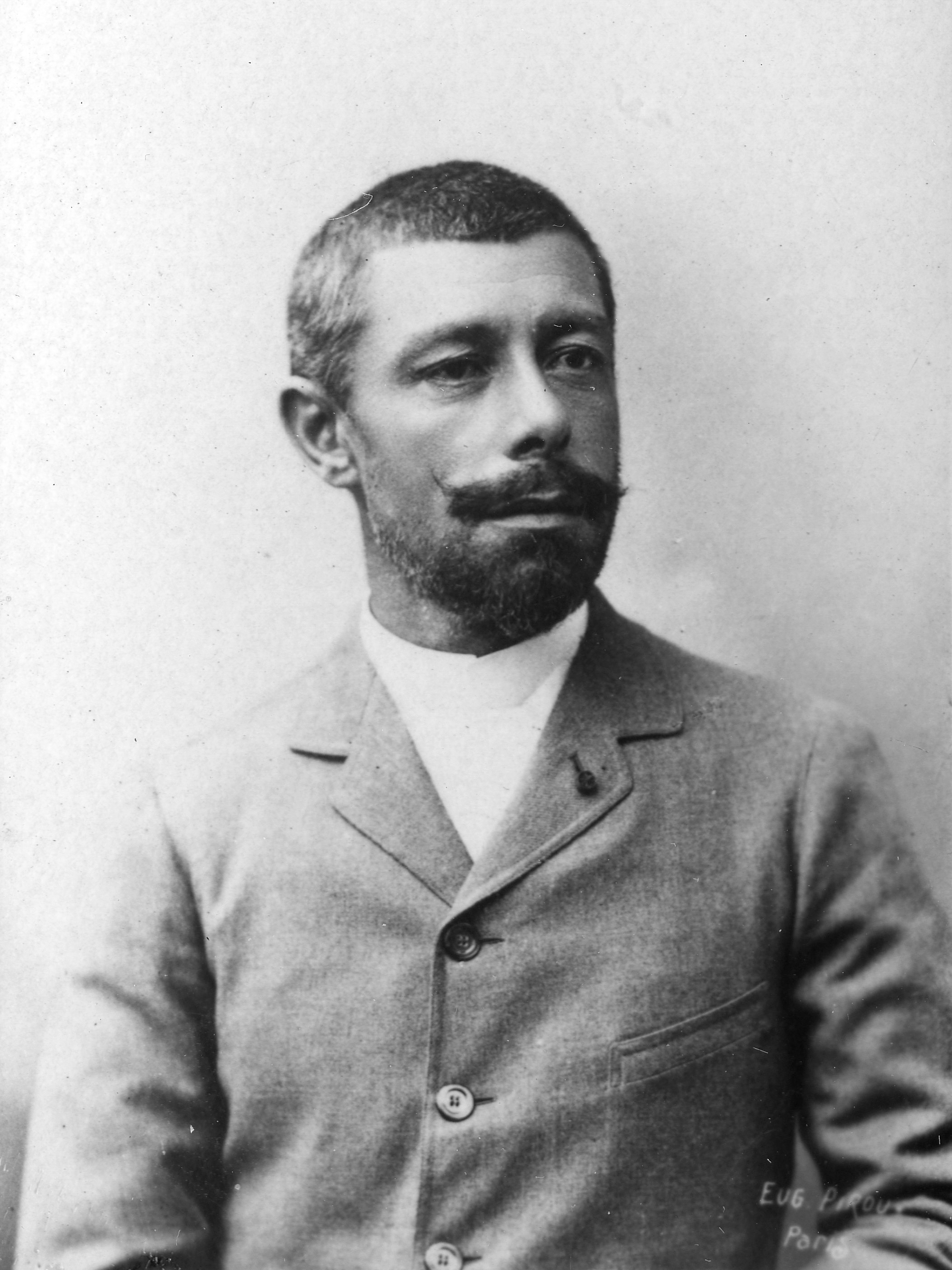
- Birth name: Louis Alexandre Antoine Mizon
- Born: 1853; Paris, France
- Died: 1899 (aged 45–46)
- Allegiance: France
- Service / branch: French Navy

Louis Alexandre Antoine Mizon (1853–1899) was a French explorer and colonial administrator.

Born in Paris in 1853, Mizon entered in the French Navy in 1869. Between 1880 and 1883 he was at Pierre Savorgnan de Brazza's orders, with whom he had difficulties working. In 1890 he was given the command of an expedition meant to find a viable route between the Niger and the Congo rivers by passing by the Benue and Sangha River. He also led a second mission in 1892 in the same places, meant in particular to establish French control over the Adamawa (in modern Nigeria), from which the Benue, the major tributary of the Niger, rises. The plan failed, for the English protested that the claimed territory had been assigned to Britain.

In 1895 Mizon was nominated Resident of Majunga, in Madagascar. He was promoted to administrateur-superieur of Mayotte, at the orders of the governor-general of Madagascar, a position he held between 5 August 1897 and 11 March 1899. Nominated governor of Djibouti on 7 March 1899, he died, probably through suicide, on 23 March, before reaching his post.

== See also ==
- S'Nabou - Mizon's interpreter in the period 1890-1892
