= Bangwinji language =

Savanna language spoken in Nigeria

Bangwinji
- Bangjinge
- Bangwinji
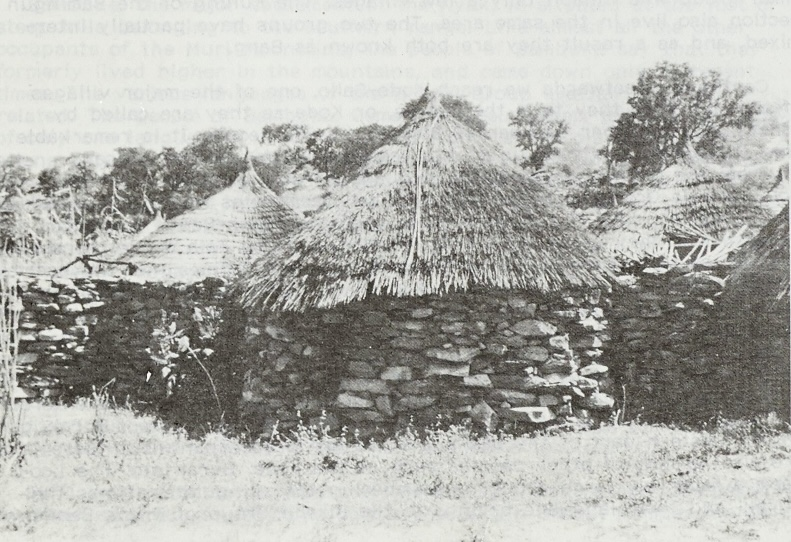
- A traditional Bangwinji compound in the Muri Mountains
- Native to: eastern Nigeria
- Region: Shongom LGA, Gombe State
- Native speakers: (6,000 cited 1992)
- Language family: Niger–Congo?: Atlantic–Congo; Waja–Kam; Waja; Tula languages; Bangwinji

Language codes
- ISO 639-3: bsj
- Glottolog: bang1348

- Person: Báŋjìŋè
- People: Báŋjìŋèb
- Language: Bangwinji

Bangwinji (Bangjinge) is one of the Savanna languages of Gombe State, eastern Nigeria. Their ethnonym is Báŋjìŋèb (pl.; sg. form: Báŋjìŋè).

There are two dialects, Kaalɔ́ and Naabáŋ. Bangwinji had originally settled in Kaalɔ́ and Naabáŋ in the northern Muri Mountains, and have since moved down into the plains.
