= Dikaka language =

Waja language spoken in Eastern Nigeria

Dikaka
- Cham
- Dijim-Bwilim
- Native to: Gombe State of Nigeria
- Ethnicity: Dijim people
- Native speakers: (25,000 cited 1998)
- Language family: Niger–Congo?: Atlantic–Congo; Waja–Kam; Waja; Cham–Mona; Dikaka
- Early forms: Dikaka: Dijim
- Dialects: Dijim (Cham, Cam); Bwilim (Mwana, Mona)
- Writing system: Latin (Dijim alphabets)

Language codes
- ISO 639-3: cfa
- Glottolog: diji1241

Dikaka or Cham is one of the Savanna languages of Middle Belt, Nigeria. It is also known as Dijim–Bwilim, after its two dialects, Dijim and Bwilim. A tonal language, it has a whistled register. It is spoken in Gombe and southwestern parts of Adamawa State of Nigeria.

== Dialects ==
The two dialects are Dijim and Bwilim.

- Dijim [dijím], spoken in and around Kindiyo (currently Cham town)
- Bwilim [bwilím], spoken in and around Mɔna (Mwona, Mwana)

Another related dialect is spoken by former speakers of the Jalaa language in and around Loojaa settlement.

== Phonology ==
It consists of 8 vowels and 17 consonants.

The vowels are: a, e, i, o, u, ǝ, ɨ, ʊ
The consonants are: b, c, d, f, g, h, j, k, l, m, n, p, r, s, t, w, y
