= Lawan Gwadabe =

Nigerian military officer and politician

Colonel Lawan Gwadabe

Military Governor of Niger State
- In office December 1987 – January 1992
- Preceded by: Garba Ali Mohammed
- Succeeded by: Musa Inuwa

Chief of Staff of the Gambian Army
- In office 1993–1994
- Preceded by: Abubakar Dada

Personal details
- Born: 1949 (age 76–77)

Military service
- Allegiance: Nigeria
- Branch/service: Nigerian Army
- Rank: Colonel
- Commands: Commander of the National Guards (Guards Brigade), 1993; Commander, 23 Armored Brigade, Yola, 1994

Lawan Gwadabe (born 1949) is a Nigerian military officer. He served as Military Administrator of Niger State in Nigeria from December 1987 to January 1992 during the military regime of General Ibrahim Babangida. He was accused of planning a coup against General Sani Abacha in 1995, for which he was jailed, tortured and convicted of treason. After Abacha's death he was granted a state pardon.

== Background and early military career ==
Gwadabe was born in 1949 in Jos, Plateau State, where he was brought up. His father was a Muslim of Fulani origin. He was involved in the coup of 27 August 1985, having just returned to 245 Recce Battalion (where he had previously been the Commanding Officer) from a course at the US Armour School, Fort Knox. He was one of the junior officers assigned the job of arresting the head of state, General Muhammadu Buhari, which they achieved without difficulty, replacing him with General Ibrahim Babangida. After the coup, Gwadabe was appointed Chairman of the Nigerian National Shipping Line. He was also Special Presidential Envoy and Chairman of the Sudan Peace Conference (1986–1990) and Special Presidential Envoy for Peace in Angola and Mozambique (1989–1990).

Babangida appointed Gwabade Governor of Niger State in December 1987. During his tenure he had to cope with a severe outbreak of cerebro-spinal meningitis, which was countered with an emergency mass-vaccination. At the start of the Nigerian Third Republic in January 1992, he handed over to the elected civilian governor Musa Inuwa. Inuwa had been Commissioner for Health in Niger State, and was relieved of his position by Gwadabe so he could run for office.

== Sani Abacha regime ==
Gwadabe was appointed Commander of the National Guards. On 17 November 1993, escorted by a detachment of the National Guards under Colonel Gwadabe, three senior army officers arrested Ernest Shonekan, the interim civilian president of Nigeria who had been appointed by General Ibrahim Babangida. The coup led to the assumption of power by General Sani Abacha. Gwadabe served as Chief of Staff of the Gambian Army, succeeding Brigadier Abubakar Dada. On his return to Nigeria after the July 1994 Yahya Jammeh coup in Gambia, he was briefly Principal Staff Officer to General Sani Abacha before being appointed Commander of 23 Armored Brigade in Yola. On 1 March 1995, he was arrested on a charge of plotting a coup against the Abacha government, and was jailed, tortured and later convicted of treason along with others. He was on death row when Abacha died unexpectedly in June 1998. Years later, Abacha's chief of staff Lt-Gen. Oladipo Diya said that he considered that the claimed coup plot was non-existent.

== Later career ==
In March 1999, the transitional military government of General Abdulsalami Abubakar granted a state pardon to Gwadabe and others accused of plotting coups against General Sani Abacha. In June 2009, President Umaru Yar'Adua granted Gwadabe and others a full pardon. In 2004, he was a leading member of the Kaduna Discussion Group, aligned with former military ruler Ibrahim Babangida.

As a board member of MTS First Wireless, in January 2005, Gwadabe alleged that the chairman had been involved in fraudulent allocation of shares and misdeeds in importation of telecommunications equipment. Gwadabe was among leaders who, in 2005, were encouraging General Ibrahim Babangida to contest the 2007 presidential election. He became a member of the board of several companies, including U2 Communications Africa and North Eastern Capital. He became CEO of Seeds Project Company and Chairman of North Eastern Integrated Oil services Ltd. His business interests include Oil and Gas, Leisure and Hospitality services. In February 2009, Gwabade was appointed chairman of the board of the Federal Road Safety Commission (FRSC). In August 2009, he announced that 22 ambulances were being deployed in the Federal Capital Territory to assist accident victims.
