= Muhammadu Kobo =

Nigerian traditional ruler

- Etsu Lapai
- Reign: 1953–2003
- Coronation: 1953
- Predecessor: Umaru Dan Ibrahim
- Successor: Umaru Bago Tafida
- Born: 1910; Lapai Emirate
- Died: June 13, 2002
- Religion: Sunni Islam
- Occupation: Teacher and Traditional leader

Muhammadu Kobo dan Aliyu Gana, OBE, CON (1910 – 13 June 2002) was the 11th Etsu Lapai of Lapai Emirate, a traditional state from (1953 – June 2002) succeeded by his nephew Umaru Bago Tafida II the 12th Etsu Lapai.

== Education and career ==
Etsu Kobo was born into the royal house of Lapai Emirate. He started his education in Agaie Elementary School from (1920 - 1922) and later attended the Bida Provincial School finishing in 1928 then attended Katsina Teachers Training College graduated there with teacher grade II in 1932 and later had his certificate in Local Government Administration at the United Kingdom.

He started his career as a teacher at Bida province school where he also served as headmaster and was later transferred to Okene Primary School (later changed to Okene middle school). He would later become headmaster of Katsina-Ala province school and Zaria Province Middle School. He quit his teaching career in 1948 and joined politics where he was elected as a member of the Northern Federal House of Assembly. He was also Tswaidan of the Lapai Emirate and Bida Native Authority before he was appointed the Etsu Lapai Emirate in 1954. During his tenure in the Northern House of Representatives, he was awarded Officer of the Order of the British Empire (OBE) by the Queen Elizabeth of England.

Kobo also served as head of Northern Nigeria Broadcasting Corporation (NNBC) in 1953.

=== Posts held as Emir includes ===
- Member Federal Scholarship and Appointment Board (1952–53)
- Member, Regional Medical Advisory Board (1955–57)
- Member, Regional Development Corporation (1955–59)
- Member, College of Arts, Science & Technology, Zaria (1952–62)
- Chairman Government Delegation to Libya and Pakistan to study the Penal Code system (1958)
- Chairman Regional Board of Governors, NBC (1961–66)
- Member National Council of Arts and Culture (1970–75)
- Chairman North Western State Arts Council (1970–76)
- Chairman North Western State Development Advisory Board (1973–76)
- Chancellor, Kano State University (1992–93)
- Patrons in Barewa Old Boys Association (BOBA) and Gamji Member's Association

== Publication ==
He was also a writer, he published a book titled A Short Foundation History of Lapai Emirate in English, Hausa and Nupe.

He was an elderly statesman, his burial was led by the Etsu Nupe Umaru Sanda Ndayako and the attendance of Gen. Ibrahim Babangida, Abdulsalami Abubakar, Abdulkadir Kure, and Senator Isa Mohammed Bagudu.
