= Yebu language =

Savanna language spoken in Nigeria

Yebu
- Awak
- Native to: Kaltungo LGA, Gombe State, eastern Nigeria
- Native speakers: (6,000 cited 1995)
- Language family: Niger–Congo?: Atlantic–Congo; Waja–Kam; Waja; Awak languages; Yebu

Language codes
- ISO 639-3: awo
- Glottolog: awak1250

Yebu (language name: Yiin Yebu; also known as Awak or Awok) is one of the Savanna languages of Kaltungo LGA in Gombe State, northeastern Nigeria.

There are five distinct dialects corresponding to each of the original five settlements that had been spoken on the Awak Hill. Yebu is currently spoken in the plains rather than in the speakers' ancestral territory of Awak Hill.

== Villages ==
Yebu villages according to Blench (2019):

Village name	IPA	Hausa/Fulfulde name	Notes
Bwara	ɓʷǎrâ		
Feka	féːkâ	Jauro Gotel	70% Yebu
Fun	fúùn	Bagaruwa	
Kewur	kʲèwúr		
Kungge	kùjèŋí		
Kuran	kūrân		
Kwabilakɛ	kʷàplākē		
Momidi	mòmīdī		
Soblong	sòlóŋ		
Tangga	tàŋgá		
Wuyaka	ɓᶣāáká	Sabon Layi	
Yeri-Tayo	tàːjó jèrí		
Cwelangi	ʧʷélàŋí		
Yebo	je᷆bǒ		

Fulani villages that have Yebu chiefs are Tɔrɛ, Langgarɛ, and Lugayidi.

Hausa villages that have Yebu chiefs are Daura, Dundaye, Salifawa, Dogon Ruwa (mixed Hausa and Yebu village), Garin Bako, Garin Korau, and Garin Barau.

Other languages spoken in the area are Waja, Kamo, Tangale, and Tula.

== Phonology ==
Yebu exhibits vowel length contrast, although it is uncommon in the language. It also has consonant gemination. There are six phonetic tones derived from three phonetic tone heights:

- High ʹ
- Mid ˉ
- Low ˋ
- Rising Low-High ˇ
- Rising Mid-High ᷄
- Falling High-Low ˆ

== Grammar ==
Future/irrealis is marked using reduplication. In the region, morphological reduplication used for such purposes is typologically rare.
