= Kamo language =

Savannas language of Nigeria

Kamo
- Ma
- Native to: eastern Nigeria
- Region: Kaltungo and Akko LGAs, Gombe State
- Native speakers: (20,000 cited 1995)
- Language family: Niger–Congo?: Atlantic–Congo; Waja–Kam; Waja; Awak; Kamo

Language codes
- ISO 639-3: kcq
- Glottolog: kamo1254

Kamo (Ma, Nyii Ma) is a Savannas language of Gombe State, eastern Nigeria. Their original settlement was on Kamo Hill, but it was abandoned as the speakers gradually moved down into the plains during the 20th century.
