= Dadiya language =

Language spoken in Nigeria

Dadiya
- Lodiya
- Native to: Northern Nigeria
- Native speakers: 70,000 (2014)
- Language family: Niger–Congo?: Atlantic–Congo; Waja–Kam; Waja; Dadiya

Language codes
- ISO 639-3: dbd
- Glottolog: dadi1249

Dadiya (Dadiya, Loodiya) is one of the Savanna languages of northeastern Nigeria. They are found in Gombe, Adamawa, and Taraba states. The Dadiya people of Gombe State are found in Balanga local government, while those in Adamawa and Taraba are found spread in Lamurde and Karim-Lamido Local government area respectively.

The Dadiya communities and its inhabitants are globally represented by an Association called Dadiya Community Development Association (DACODA). The Dadiya Elders Forum as well as other youth related associations playing role in the development of Dadiya includes the Dadiya Youth Development Association (DAYODA), the Dadiya Youth Development Foundation (DYDF) and Dadiya Youth Success Forum.

The Dadiya peoples' king/ruler is identified as the 'Folo Dadiya'. He lives in the headquarters of Dadiya Land, Bambam. The Dadiya people are friendly and accommodating, They live together with other tribes in peace in Bambam including the Waja tribe, Tula, cham and Tangale tribe.

Most of Dadiya settlements are named with a prefix "Loo" which means loosely means settlements or houses. Popular settlements in Dadiya includes Anguwan Magaji, Lookwila, Lookulakuli, Loogolwa, Looja, Lofiyo, Lobasi, Loofa, Loodib, Loobware other settlements are kafin bawa, Dogon dutse, Mai-tunku, Bambam, Balaifi, Tunga, Delifla, Sabara, Yelwa, Nasarawo, among others.

Dadiya people have festivals which they use to display their culture, some are done every year while some once in a while like Yeelin, "KAL" which occur once in five years.

Dadiya people are known to be farmers because of their mass and fertile land, they farm groundnut, rice, maize, beans, etc because the land is surrounded by rocks and mountains, the Dadiya people believe that the land is blessed with lots of mineral resources.

The Dadiya people have no access road that connects the villages. The Nigeria government neglected the Dadiya land and their people because they do not have many of its people in the government that will lobby and bring development to Dadiya land. Once the rainy season starts, the Dadiya people are cut away from the rest of the world because of a big river that flows almost throughout the rainy season.

== Distribution ==
Dadiya settlements were originally located in and around the Muri Mountains.

- Muri Mountains (northern ridge, in settlements such as LɔɔKwila, LɔɔFiyo, LɔɔBwarɛ, and LɔɔKulakuli)
- Loo Basin (such as in LɔɔTip and LɔɔFaa)
- south of the Muri Mountains (settlements in the foothills, such as Tunga and Bollere)

Today, Dadiya is spoken in Bambam, where the 'Folo of Dadiya' lives in one of its wards.
