= Abdulkadir Kure =

Nigerian politician

Governor of Niger State
- In office 29 May 1999 – 29 May 2007
- Preceded by: Habibu Idris Shuaibu
- Succeeded by: Mu'azu Babangida Aliyu

Personal details
- Born: 26 February 1956 Lapai, Niger State, Nigeria
- Died: 8 January 2017 (aged 60) Germany
- Party: PDP

Abdulkadir Kure (26 February 1956 – 8 January 2017) was a Nigerian politician who served as Governor of Niger State in Nigeria from 29 May 1999 to 29 May 2007. He was a member of the People's Democratic Party (PDP). In May 2000, he introduced Sharia law in Niger State.

== Personal life ==
Kure was married to Zainab Abdulkadir Kure, a former civil servant and, beginning in 2007, a member of the Nigerian Senate until 2015. They had two daughters and four sons.

Kure hailed from Lapai Local Government of the state, he held a traditional title of Rani Lapai. He died on 8 January 2017 in Germany at the age of 60.
