= Tula language =

Savanna language spoken in Nigeria

Tula
- Native to: northeastern Nigeria
- Region: Kaltungo LGA, Gombe State
- Native speakers: (30,000 cited 1998)
- Language family: Niger–Congo?: Atlantic–Congo; Waja–Kam; Waja; Tula languages; Tula

Language codes
- ISO 639-3: tul
- Glottolog: tula1252

Tula (also Kotule or Kitule) is one of the Savanna languages of Gombe State, northeastern Nigeria.

== Dialects ==
Kleinewillinghöfer (2014) lists three Tula dialects.

- Tula-Wange (Kutule) is possibly the oldest group. There are several hamlets located on the Tula Plateau. The people refer to themselves as Kɪtʊlɛ.
- Tula-Baule, possibly former Chadic speakers who had shifted to Tula.
- Tula-Yiri or Yili is the smallest and most divergent group.
