= Musa Inuwa =

Nigerian politician (1948–2010)

Governor of Niger State
- In office January 1992 – November 1993
- Preceded by: Lawan Gwadabe
- Succeeded by: Cletus Komena Emein

Personal details
- Born: 1948
- Died: 16 January 2010 (aged 62) Zaria
- Party: NRC, ANPP
- Children: three
- Occupation: physician

Musa Inuwa, CON (1948 – 16 January 2010) was governor of Niger State in Nigeria from January 1992 to November 1993, elected as a member of the National Republican Convention (NRC). He was of Kanbari extraction, from the Kontagora zone of Niger State.

He ran for governor of Niger in April 2003 on the All Nigeria People's Party ticket, coming third after Abdulkadir Kure of the People's Democratic Party and Mustapha Bello of the People's Redemption Party (PRP).

In March 2006 he and other Niger State leaders urged the government to prevail on the National Assembly to stop the constitutional review, on the basis that the Nigerian constitution was less than seven years old. In December 2006, he was made Commander of the Order of the Niger.

Musa Inuwa died on January 16, 2010, in Zaria at age 62.
