= Agaie Emirate =

Agaie
- Emirate
- Location in Nigeria
- Coordinates: 9°01′N 6°19′E
- Country: Nigeria
- State: Niger State

The Agaie Emirate was a state created by Malam Baba, a Fulani religious scholar/warrior who conquered the Nupe people of the area in 1822. Its seat was the present town of Agaie in Niger State, Nigeria, and was subject to the Sokoto Caliphate. Baba's son Abdullahi was inaugurated as the first emir of Agaie in 1832. The Agaie Emirate comprised one part of the old Nupe Kingdom, the others being the Bida Emirate and the Lapai Emirate.

== Early rulers ==
The rulers were of the Etsu dynasty, with inheritance sometimes from father to son, sometimes from one brother to another.

- Etsu Abdullai I (1832–1855), the first Emir, was succeeded by his son Mamman-Dikko.
- Mamman-Dikko (1855–1877) joined with the Emirs of Bida and Lapai on further military conquests, although falling out with them and engaging in skirmishes over land.
- Etsu Nuhu (1877–1900) allied with the Emir of Bida in fighting the British Niger company, which was expanding into Fulani territory.

== Colonial period rulers ==
- Etsu Abubakar I (1900–1919) avoided further fighting and accepted British rule, retaining his position under the new rulers.
- Etsu Abubakar II (1919–1926) was responsible for moving the Divisional Office from Baro to Agaie in 1920, and for opening the Agaie market.
- Etsu Abdullahi II (1926–1936) gained considerable power and wealth during his period of rule, including a collection of gold animals.
- Etsu Alhaji Aliyu (1936–1953) attended provincial school in Kano, and was supervisor of the village heads of the Agaie Emirate before becoming Emir. In 1950 he became the first Emir to undertake the pilgrimage to Mecca travelling by air.

== Post independence rulers ==
After independence, the rulers came increasingly under the control of the civilian or military government.

- Etsu Alhaji Muhammadu Bello (1953–1989) was elected by the Agaie Native Authority in 1953. During his extended rule Nigeria gained independence, and the emirate saw developments such as the opening of secondary schools and health centers.
- Etsu Muhammadu Attahiru (1989–1994) was installed by the military governor Colonel Lawan Gwadabe, but later dethroned by the military governor Colonel Cletus Emein due to allegations (later disproved) of involvement in the murder of the chairman of the Agaie Local Government. He was not immediately replaced.
- Etsu Abubakar III (1996–1998) was appointed in 1996, but engaged throughout his term in legal battles with his predecessor. After his death, the office was again not filled immediately due to the ongoing legal challenges by Etsu Muhammadu Attahiru.
- Etsu Muhammadu Attahiru (1999–2003) was eventually restored. During his second term he started to rebuild the Etsu Nuhu mosque.
- Etsu Muhammadu Kudu Abubakar (2004 – 2014) was appointed on the death of Etsu Muhammadu Attahiru.
- Etsu Alhaji Yussuf Nuhu (since 2014)
