= Waja language =

Savannas language of eastern Nigeria

Waja
- Wɪyáà
- Region: eastern Nigeria
- Native speakers: (60,000 cited 1989)
- Language family: Niger–Congo?: Atlantic–Congo; Waja–Kam; Waja; Tula; Waja

Language codes
- ISO 639-3: wja
- Glottolog: waja1259

Waja (also known as Nyan Wiyau, Wiyaa, or Wuya) is a Savannas language of northeastern Nigeria. Dialectical differences between Deruwo (Wajan Dutse) and Waja proper (Wajan Kasa) are slight.

== Dialects ==
Waja dialects:

- Wɩyáà (Wajan Kasa), spoken in ten settlements, including Talasse (main settlement that is home to the Emir of Waja).
- Derúwò (Hill Waja or Wajan Dutse), spoken in Deri. There are two varieties:
  - Putoki, Kulani, and Degri
  - Sikkam and Degri
