= Tso language =

Savanna language spoken in Nigeria

Tso
- nyi tsó
- Native to: eastern Nigeria
- Native speakers: (16,000 cited 1992)
- Language family: Niger–Congo?: Atlantic–Congo; Waja–Kam; Waja; Cham–Mona; Tso

Language codes
- ISO 639-3: ldp
- Glottolog: tsoo1241

Tsó
- People: tsó-bó
- Language: nyi tsó

Tso (Tsóbó, Lotsu, Cibbo) is one of the Savanna languages of eastern Nigeria.

== Dialects ==
The language is known as nyi tsó, while the people are known as Tsobo [tsó-bó]. They are called Pire by their neighbors. The ethnic subgroups are,

- Bərbou
- Swaabou
- Gusobu

A subsection of the Gusobu may also live in Luzoo settlement.

Each ethnic subgroup speaks a different Tso dialect. The Swaabou and Gusobu reportedly have trouble understanding each other. Tso lexical diversity is partly due to the tradition of word tabooing.
