= Lapai Emirate =

Lapai
- Emirate
- Location in Nigeria
- Coordinates: 8°49′N 6°41′E
- Country: Nigeria
- State: Niger State

Government
  - Type: Traditional state
  - Etsu: Umaru Bago Tafida

The Lapai Emirate, today in Nigeria, is a traditional state that lies near the Gurara River, a tributary to the Niger River, formerly originally inhabited where Gbari People, and presently came under the power of Nupe people, covering roughly the same area as the modern Lapai local government area.

In the 1790s the Nupe Kingdom was a rising power in the region and had taken Lapai from Oyo. However, with the onslaught of the Fulani Jihad their lands, including Lapai, were conquered by the Sokoto Caliphate. The people of the region became subject to the Hausa kingdom of Zazzau. After 1804 they came under the Fulani emirate of Zaria, part of the realm of the emir of Gwandu. The Lapai emirate was separated from the emirates of Zaria and Agaie in 1825. The emirate was founded in 1828 when Mallam Baba sent his Lieutenant Daudu Muza to subjugate the area. Daudu was successful, but kept the land for himself. The emirate remained a tributary to the Gwandu emirate until 1903, when the British took control.

== Rulers ==
The emirate remains in existence, although it was subject first to British colonial rule and later to civilian or military rule of the independent state of Nigeria. Emirs were:

- Da'udu Maza dan Jaura (1825 - 1832)
- Yamuza dan Jaura (1832 - 1835)
- Baji dan Jaura (1835 - 1838)
- Jantabo dan Jaura (1838 - 1874)
- `Atiqu dan Jantabo (1874 - 1875)
- Bawa dan Jantabo (1875 - 1893)
- `Abd al-Qadiri dan (1893 - 1907)
- Ibrahim dan Jantabo (1907 - 1923)
- `Aliyu Gana dan `Abd al-Qadiri (1923 - Apr 1937)
- `Umaru dan Ibrahim (1937 - Nov 1954)
- Muhammadu Kobo dan `Aliyu Gana (1954 - 13 Jun 2002)
- Umaru Bago Tafida (10 Aug 2002)
