= Tula–Waja languages =

Savannas language branch of Nigeria

Tula–Waja
- Tula–Wiyaa
- Geographic distribution: northeastern Nigeria
- Linguistic classification: Niger–Congo?: Atlantic–Congo; Volta–Congo; Savannas; Waja–Kam; Tula–Waja
- Subdivisions: Awak; Cham–Mona; Dadiya; Tula

Language codes
- ISO 639-3: –
- Glottolog: tula1250

The Tula–Waja, or Tula–Wiyaa languages are a branch of the provisional Savanna languages, closest to Kam (Nyingwom), spoken in northeastern Nigeria. They are spoken primarily in southeastern Gombe State and other neighbouring states.

They were labeled "G1" in Joseph Greenberg's Adamawa language-family proposal and later placed in a Waja–Jen branch of that family.

Guldemann (2018) observes significant internal lexical diversity within Tula-Waja, partly as a result of word tabooing accelerating lexical change. Although noun classes have been lost in Dadiya, Maa, and Yebu, Waja and Tula retain complex noun class systems. Kleinewillinghöfer (1996) also observes many morphological similarities between the Tula–Waja and Central Gur languages, a view shared by Bennett (1983) and Bennett & Sterk (1977).

== Languages ==
- Awak: Awak (Yebu), Kamo
- Cham–Mona: Dijim-Bwilim, Tso
- Dadiya
- Tula: Bangwinji, Tula, Waja

== Classification ==
Ulrich Kleinewillinghöfer (2014), in the Adamawa Languages Project website, classifies the Tula–Waja languages as follows. Kleinewillinghöfer considers Tso and Cham to be branches that had diverged earlier. Waja is considered by Kleinewillinghöfer to be a distinct branch, although its exact position within Tula-Waja remains uncertain.

Tula–Waja

- Core Tula group
  - Tula
    - Kutule
      - Wange
      - Baule
    - Yiri (Yili)
  - Dadiya (local variants)
  - Bangwinji
    - Kaalo
    - Naabaŋ
- Yebu (Awak) (local variants)
- Ma (Kamo, Kamu)
- Cham
  - Dijim of Kindiyo
  - Bwilim (of Mɔna and Loojaa)
- Tso (Lotsu-Piri)
  - Tso of the Swaabou
  - Tso of the Bərbou
    - Tso of the Gusubo
    - Tso of Luuzo
- Waja
  - Waja of Wɩɩ (Wajan Kasa) (local variants)
  - Waja of Deri (Wajan Dutse) (two variants)

== Names and locations ==
Below is a list of language names, populations, and locations from Blench (2019).

| Language | Dialects | Alternate spellings | Own name for language | Endonym(s) | Other names (location-based) | Other names for language | Exonym(s) | Speakers | Location(s) |
|---|---|---|---|---|---|---|---|---|---|
| Dijim–Bwilim | | | | | | | | 7,545 (1968). ca. 20 villages | Gombe State, Balanga LGA, Adamawa State, Lamurde LGA |
| Dijim | | | Dijim | sg Níi Dìjí pl. Dìjím | Cham, Cam, Kindiyo, | | | | |
| Bwilim | | | Bwilə́m | sg Níi Bwilí pl. Bwilə́m | Mwana, Mwona [Hausa name], Fitilai [village name] | | | 4,282 | |
| Dadiya | | Nda Dia, Dadia | Bwe Daddiya pl. Daddiyab | Nyíyò Daddiya | | | | 3,986 (1961), 20,000 (1992 est.). | Gombe State, Balanga LGA, Taraba State, Karim Lamido LGA and Adamawa State, Lamurde LGA. Between Dadiya and Bambam. |
| Ma | | | Ma sg. nụbá Ma pl. | nyii Ma | Kamo, Kamu | | | 3000 (SIL) | Gombe State, Kaltungo and Akko LGAs |
| Tsobo | Bәrbou, Guzubo, Swabou | Cibbo | Tsóbó | nyi Tsó | Lotsu–Piri, Pire, Fire | Kitta | | 2,000 (1952) | Gombe State, Kaltungo LGA, Adamawa State, Numan LGA |
| Tula | Baule, Wangke [used for literacy development], Yiri | Ture | yii Kitule | Naba Kitule pl. Kitule | | | | 19,209 (1952 W&B); 12,204 (1961–2 Jungraithmayr); 19,000 (1973 SIL). ca. 50 villages ?100,000 est. | Gombe State, Kaltungo LGA. Tula is 30 km. east of Billiri. |
| Wiyaa | Plain and Hills | Wagga | Nyan Wịyáù | Wịyáà | Waja | | | 19,700 (1952 W&B); 50,000 (1992 est.) | Gombe State, Balanga and Kaltungo LGAs, Waja district. Taraba State, Bali LGA. |
| Bangjinge | Nabang, Kaloh [orthography based on Nabang] | Bangunji, Bangunje, Bangwinji | Báŋjìŋè sg. Báŋjìŋèb pl. | nyii Bánjòŋ | | | | 8000 CAPRO (1995a). 25 villages (2008) | Gombe State, Shongom LGA |
| Yebu | | | Yěbù | Nìín Yěbù | Awok | | | 2,035 (1962) | Gombe State, Kaltungo LGA: 10 km northeast of Kaltungo |

== See also ==
- Tula-Waja word lists (Wiktionary)
