= List of villages in Taraba State =

This is a comprehensive list of villages and settlements in Taraba State, Nigeria organised by local government area (LGA) and district/area (with postal codes also given).

== By postal code ==
| LGA | District / Area | Postal code | Villages |
|---|---|---|---|
| Ardo Kola | Ardo Kola | 660102 | Ardo-Kola; Iware; Jauro-Yinu; Jiru; Lamido-Borno; Mallum; Mayo-Ranewo; Sarkin-Dutse; Sibre; Sunkani; Tau; Zongon-Kombi |
| Bali | Bakundi | 672101 | Aka; Aruta; Asinai; Badakoshi; Bagoni; Bajabure; Bakundi; Bali; Bankayire; Bariki; Bayere; Bokki; Borno Kurukuru; Cude; Dali; Daniya; Fondulare; Gangfir; Gangumi; Ganpentom; Garbachede; Garin Garba Kungana; Garin Garba Suntai; Garin Ulu; Garin-Jatau; Garke; Gayo; Gazabu-Balkeji; Gongkwai; Gurama; Hawan-Mata; Jameta-Kundi; Jammiri; Jauro-Bam; Kaigama; Kamalifidi; Kankani; Kararuwa; Kasina; Kungana; Kwagiri; Kwanah Jukun; Kwanan Damisa; Kwassa; Mahanga; Mahurmi; Mai Biutu; Mai hulo; Maichibi; Maigoge; Maigoro; Maikarfi; Maikinta; Mailaya; Maisamari; Maisaye-Yandang; Mallam-Yaro; Mayokam; Murna-Chomu; Nahuta; Nakwai; Nya; Nyagong; Nyalli; Pangri; Panri; Sabon Dale; Sabon Gida; Sabon Kasuwa; Sansani; Sarkin Dawa; Shuwa; Suntai; Takalafiya; Tondurum; Tonti; Waya; Wurbu; Wuro Amadu; Yakai; Yelwa; Yelwa Kararuwa; Zaga |
| Bali | Dakka | 672102 | Ardo Tiba; Boduri; Dakka; Dekusum; Gamgboni; Ganga Dole; Gangbiyiwa; Gangburanmaso; Ganggira; Gangkita; Ganglari; Garbatau; Garin Ibrahim; Garin Jatau; Garin Samari; Garin Sambo; Garin-Kuri; Gong Dole; Jangare; Kampu; Kanwe Maroko; Mading; Mana Gangduniyaru; Masa-Ibbi; Mini Miri Donlola; Nyawanti; Nyenalongba; Nyikusum; Pamanga; Shena; Tiba; Timjemi; Wuro Hausa; Zoban Shakuna |
| Donga | Donga | 671102 | Akate; Akume; Ananum; Anzaye; Atsagbo; Ayabagri; Bibinu; Daton; Donga; Farin-Ruwa; Gadarko; Gankwe; Gankwe-Bariki; Gankwe-Yeba; Gayama; Gbamuna; Gidan-Dutse; Gidan-Jatau; Gidan-Makeri; Jatau; Kumbo; Lagos-Buban; Mararaba; Ndoro; Nhuwha; Nukpo; Nukuya; Numai; Nyabe; Nyimui; Nyiru; Nyita; Sabongida; Sabongida Tukura; Sanso; Suntai; Tai; Tisa; Tor-Damisa; Tunari; Ude |
| Gashaka | Gashaka | 663101 | Adagoro; Azoratar; Balewa; Boder; Burtai; Danbarau; Dandi Gazabu; Dogo Ajam; Gameri; Gandole; Gangumi; Garbabi; Gashaka; Gayam; Geidam Gindin-Dutse; Gidan Tiv; Gidan Usman; Goje; Gumti; Injawai; Jamtari; Karamti; Kobaje; Kofai-Kwagir; Lagaso; Mai Suma; Mayo Handu; Mayo Kam; Mayo Selbe; Mayo-Yim; Nagamu Sallama; Nyabar; Sangere; Sarkin Ruwa; Serbe; Serti; Taraba; Tonga; Tungwa; Yakuba |
| Gassol | Gassol | 672104 | Ashi-Arage; Beida; Borno; Duniya Dan-Anacha; Gargala; Gassol; Gidan-Sartin; Gombe; Jafuma; Kufai; Madani; Maiwuya; Mbodawa; Nafuche; Namguru; Nassarawa; Njiddawa; Sabongida; Sendurde; Takai; Tella; Wurno; Wuro-Boki; Wuro-Jam; Wuryo |
| Gassol | Mutum Biyu | 672103 | Abba; Agungu; Aho-Abun; Awambe; Bada-Koshi; Dajo; Garba Chede; Garin Mallam; Gidan Hav; Gunduma; Jara-Babba; Jauro-Manu; Kufai; Maigemu Nannai; Mnyamchie; Mutum Biyu; Peou; Sabon-Magaji; Samda; San-Sani; Sarkin Shira; Sarkin-Ruwa; Sha-Apela-Agbe; Torkegh; Tsokugh-Aberaka; Tura Keke; Tutare; Unguwar-Maji; Wuro-Mane; Yerima |
| Ibi | Dampara | 670111 | Dampar; Farin-Ruwa; Gidan-Alhaji; Gidan-Dangiwa; Kauyen-Dodo; Kurmin-Sauri; Mavo; Sarki-Noma |
| Ibi | Ibi | 670109 | Anbua-Oranya; Awuru-Audu; Badan-Koshi; Gazok; Gindin-Waya; Gishiru-Hassan; Ibi; Ibua; Kauyen-Sarki; Kegh-Aguji; Kogiwase; Koso; Maso; Mkouor-Nyinka; Moti; Tepga; Tudun-Wadan; Yamuer-Agbakyo |
| Ibi | Sarkin Kudu | 670110 | Dogon-Ruwa; Dooshima; Gurbin-Dutse; Kauyen-Safiyo; Rafin-Danisa; Sarkin-Kudu |
| Jalingo | Jalingo (Rural) | 660101 | Abbare; Abuja; Askarawa; Ambaliya; Bakari; Balau; Baraya; Bubai; Dogo; Dorowa; Fan; Gada Walawol; Gajer; Gamyel; Garin Baba; Garin Jalo; Garin Kari; Garin Sarki-Fada; Hamdella; Iyabamuye; Jaure Shendu; Jauro Abba; Jauro Awo; Jauro Yeno; Jauro Votoh; Jekadafari; Jen Bambu; Jivunu; Kaduna Iyali; Kalanko; Kanbi; Karofi; Kasuwan Yelwa; Kona Manga; Korkaye; Magami; Mallam Ali; Mafindi; Mallam-Gabdo; Mallam-Joda; Mamani; Mayogwoi; Mudibbo; Murbai; Nana Aisha; Nasarawo; Nunkai; Nyandang; Okona; Pan; Pasli; Petal; Porni; Rimi; Rubi; Sabongari; Sambo; Samunaka; Sarkin Noma; Saurara; Sheudu; Sintali; Sundari; Todiri; Tudun Wada; Wueojauro; Wuro Kadiri; Wuro Sambe; Wuro-Sani; Wuro Musa; Yamusala; Zhiru |
| Karim Lamido | Old Muri | 662107 | Amar; Didango; Jeb-Jeb; Jukun; Kwaai; Moya-Renewo; Muri; Nguruwa; Yashin-Tuwo |
| Karim Lamido | Wurkum | 662106 | Andami; Angulle; Anguwan Rogo; Bachama; Balassa; Bambuka; Bambur; Bandawa; Banyam; Bikwin; Dadiya; Darofai; Gangan Balassa; Garu Awanke; Gomu; Gomu-Ndugan; Hakuri; Jen-Ardido; Jen-Kaigama; Jen-Petel; Karim Maudi; Karim-Lamido; Kirim; Kode Dutse; Kode Menung; Kode Saliya; Kwanchi; Langakwanchi; Loh-Ndara; Low-Bamli; Munga Lelou; Munga-Dosso; Murbai; Mutum Daya; Ngurore-Jabu; Panya; Piribi; Pitiko; Pitiko Buro; Pitiko Dukuli; Sabon Gari-Jen; Sabongari Dadiya; Saladuna; Salakan City; Senge; Wanzami Gomu; Zailani; Zoh Dutse; Zoh Makarau |
| Kurmi | Kurmi | 671104 | Abong; Akoferi; Akonko; Akwento; Asha; Ashuku; Bafum; Baissa; Bangara; Batuamada; Bente; Bissaula; Boko; Daubelli; Dogo; Gatari; Gidan Ago; Gidan Ali; Gidan Mallam; Gidan Yamusa; Gwanda; Karanuwa; Kpwola; Kufai-Bawuro; Kurmi; Mubi Tosso; Nama-Baba; Namagangere; Ndaforo Dutse; Ndaforo; Ngbashi; Niuwande; Nyido; Sabon Gida Tukura; Gidan-Mallam |
| Lau | Abbare | 662104 | Abbare; Bujum; Mayo-Lope; Nanzo; Sabongida; Yitti |
| Lau | Gowe | 662103 | Didango Rhobi; Didango-Filani; Donadda |
| Lau | Karlahi | 662105 | Kwamiding; Mesheli; Saturaki; Sayonti |
| Lau | Kunini | 662102 | Garin-Magaji; Jimlari; Kunini; Mararaban-Fulani; Mayo-Lushi |
| Lau | Lau | 662101 | Donbelli; Garin Mashi; Garin Sarki; Garin Lakawa; Garin-Dogo; Lainde; Lau; Lau Habe; Minda |
| Sardauna | Gembu | 663102 | Bang; Dorofi; Furmi; Gembu; Gurgu; Hainare; Kabri; Kakara; Kassalasa Kaniyaka; Kuai; Kuara-Kuara; Kuma; Kusuku; Lekitaba; Leme; Magu; Mai-Samari; Mayo Nago; Mayo Selbe; Mayo Sumsum; Mayon-Daga; Mayu; Mbamnga; Mbar; Mbartule; Mbaso; Mbu; Naguroje; Nguroje; Njawai; Njeke; Nver; Tamnyar; Titong; Vakude; Wah; Warkaka; Warwar; Wurum-Gora; Yelwa; Yerimaru; Gurgu;Mbinti; Sah-kaka; Tep; Kuh;Leme-Tella;Leme-Dawu;Tappare |
| Takum | Takum | 671101 | Abin; Abuja; Acha; Adekpa; Aganko; Akaniwe; Army Barrack; Bakin Kasuwa; Bariki Lissa; Bete; Bibi; Bigbo; Bika; Bika Gaba; Bika Lupwe; Bika-Baba; Bong; Botin; Bokyuk; Chachanji; Chiakara; Dafung; Damu; Dogo Gawa; Donga; Dutse; Fadama; Fete; Gadin; Galumje; Gamgang; Gamga; Ganti; Gatati; Gawa; General Hospital; Hagah; Handev; Iyuda; Jada; Jenuwa Nyifiye; Jenuwa Nykwu; Jenuwa Ruma; Jenuwa-Gida; Kabya; Kandev; Kano; Kashimbila; Kasuwa Haske; Katso; Kogi Kandev; Kufi; Kufun Ahmadu; Kukunu; Kumbo; Kunlebira; Kuru-Sati; Kwambai; Kwenbwoi; Kapya akikai; Kapya Baba; Liji; Mamu; Manga; Nyayirim; Shibong Igbang |
| Ussa | Ussa | 671103 | Fikyu; Jatau; Kpakya; Kpambo; Kpambo-Puri; Kwesati; Lissam; Lissam Sambo; Lissam-Kuben; Lissam-Tunga; Lufu; Lumbu; Lupwe; Manya; Rufu; Tati; Tati-Kumbo; Tutuwa; Ussa; Yikiben; Yikes |
| Wukari | Arufu | 670107 | Akwana; Arufu; Gidan-Ikwe; Nndo-Yaku; Tombo; Unofo; Warawa; Zebu |
| Wukari | Auyi | 670102 | Auyi; Barki; Puje; Pwadzu |
| Wukari | Bantaje | 670108 | Anyam; Bantaje; Beyora; Chediya; Gbogodo; Gidan Dorowa; Jibo; Natride; Nayinawa; Nwono; Nyamkwala; Sabongida; Tapare; Tudunwada |
| Wukari | Chonku | 670104 | Agbarike; Chonku; Kyaior |
| Wukari | Gidan Idi | 670106 | Aben-Kaho; Bye-Pi; Bye-Vvi; Gidan-Idi; Kuyu |
| Wukari | Kente | 670105 | Igba; Kenke; Sondi; Vaase |
| Wukari | Rafin Kada | 670103 | Abako; Agbadu; Ason; Gavyo; Gborbegha; Ityogbedia; Rafinkada; Tsokundi; Vereshe; Zapine |
| Wukari | Wukari | 670101 | Wukari |
| Yorro | Kwaji | 661102 | Jika; Kakware; Manzalana; Mbang; Mika-Isoho-Gari; Mika-Sabongida; Pa-Nyala; Pabezalang; Pupule; Yanka |
| Yorro | Mumuye | 661101 | Dadaa; Dankum; Dasso; Demba; Dilla; Donkin; Gampu; Kajon; Kassa; Lankaviri; Lanko; Lapu; Nyaja; Pantisawa; Santewa; Shampa-Ganna; Sumbu; Yorro |
| Zing | Bitako | 661105 | Bitako-Mazara; Bitako-Yalli; Bushankin; Jahbansi; Kobanko |
| Zing | Bugong | 661104 | Bubong; Buzza; Lappo; Lapudinding; Yonko; Zensi; Zippo |
| Zing | Dinding | 661108 | Dangong; Dinding; Kossa; Kugong |
| Zing | ZLemman | 661107 | Bansi; Dandi; Dong; Lemma |
| Zing | Monkin | 661109 | Batta; Bibong; Dogwe; Gudubong; Kayya; Monkin |
| Zing | Yakoko | 661106 | Dangwe; Della; Lorro; Medika; Nanapu; Tolang; Yakoko |
| Zing | Zing | 661103 | Bisomporo; Bitako Dokure; Bitako Ibrahim; Boduga Kamawa; Boduga Nanapu; Bosung; Danvoh; Debambu; Didonko; Doppah; Dossa; Dukka; Fufulagwang; Gwangwang; Jaganpo; Jeng; Kagong; Kakulu; Kodari; Koko; Kosensi; Koyu; Kozensi; Kugong-Boli; Kwana; Kwapo; Kwapo-Jitta; La apo; Labumang; Ladanna; Lago Bansi; Mang; Manpali; Mepuru; Nasirde; Ngole; Sagwe; Sagwe-Jabu; Sawankwa; Shari; Taburaze; Tavin Gwa; Togoppi; Wagwala; Yellen; Yelli; Yukwa; Zandi; Zang; Zing |

== By electoral ward ==
Below is a list of polling units, including villages and schools, organised by electoral ward.

| LGA | Ward | Polling Unit Name |
|---|---|---|
| Ardo - Kola | Alim Gora | Alim Gora I, Alim Gora Primary School; Alim Gora II, Company Gate; Alim Gora III, Market Square; Wakili Gamowai, Wakili Palace |
| Ardo - Kola | Ardo Kola | Audu Giwa, Near Market Square; Garin Bakka, Near Maianguwa Palace; Jauro Buba, Near Market Square; Wakili Kachala, Near Maianguwa Palace; Jauro Jessing, Near Maianguwa Palace; Jauro Mashi I, Near Maianguwa Palace; Jauro Mashi II, Near Maianguwa Palace; Wakili Yoppo, Wakili Primary School |
| Ardo - Kola | Jauro Yinu | Jauro Kamai I, C. O. E. Gate; Jauro Kamai II, C. O. E. Gate; Jauro Kamai III, C. O. A. Gate; Jauro Muya, Near Jauro Muya; Jauro Yinu I, Yinu Primary School; Jauro Yinu II, Yinu Primary School; Kurnayel, Jauro's Palace; Murbai, Primary School |
| Ardo - Kola | Lamido Borno | Badawaire, Near Jauro's Palace; Garin Cheudo, Cheudo Primary School; Jauro Dahiru, Near Jauro Dahiru Palace; Kpanti Yali, Yali Primary School; Lamido Borno, Dispensary; Safayarna Market Square; Tampure, Market Square; Wuro Bakka, Near Jauro's Palace; Wuro Ladde, Near Jauro Palace |
| Ardo - Kola | Mayo Ranewo | Jiru Dauda, Primary School; Pomi, Pomi Primary School; Sarkin Alaro, Sarkin Yanma Palace; Sarkin Babbo I, Kofan Billa; Sarkin Babbo II, Unguwan Kabawa; Sarkin Garma I, Garma Primary School; Sarkin Garma II, Garma Primary School |
| Ardo - Kola | Sarkin Dutse | Anguwan Kirbi, Near Jauro's Palace; Anguwan Vokkai, Near Jauro Vokai's Palace; Jauro Danwe, Near Market Square; Sarkin Dutse, Dutse Primary School; Jauro Ibrahim I, Ibrahim Primary School; Jauro Ibrahim II, Ibrahim Primary School |
| Ardo - Kola | Sunkani | Adamu Chamba, Behind Mosque; Alimfulani, Open Space In Town; Anguwan Soki, Market Square; Baba Jika, Near Market; Dispensary, Near Dispensary; Gdss, Gdss Ground; Sabon Layi, Anguwan Sabon Layi; Wuro Ishaku, Opp. Secretariat |
| Ardo - Kola | Tau | Karim Lazai, Near Jauro Palace; Korkaye, Near Jauro Palace; Shomo Dagule, Near Jauro Palace; Shomo Gali, Near Jauro Palace; Tau Galadima, Near Jauro Palace |
| Ardo - Kola | Zongon Kombi | Jauro Ahmadu, Primary School; Garin Audu, Behind Mosque; Garin Ayuba, Open Space; Garin Kari; Jauro Manga, Open Palace; Garin Mata, Open Space; Hamman Hamza, Open Space; Zongon Kombi, Zongon Primary School |
| Bali | Badakoshi | Badakoshi, Sansani; Bawi, Sarkin Dawa; Garken Sama, Garken Sama; Gobirawa, Gobirawa; Hamman Adama, Garin Jalo; Jauro Sarde, Pangri; Jauro Letere, Letere; Jatau Sabti, Jatau Sabti; Karkare, Karkare; Kamajik, Kamajik; Linkusum, Kusum; Mayo Kam, Bariki; Sule Zudei, Zudei; Tari, Tari |
| Bali | Bali A | Adamu I, Central Primary School; Adamu II, Ung. Chamba K. Dambature; Adamu III, Central Primary School; Adamu IV, K/Toro Tondo; Audu, G/Mangoro Hospital Road; Jammiri, Jammiri; J/Bungah, J/Buwgah; M/Gajere, M/Gajere; Nayinawa, Nayinawa; S/Baka, S/Baka; Waya, Waya |
| Bali | Bali B | Asinai, Asinai; Bawa I, Gindin Dutse; Bawa II, Kofan Sarki; Daniya, Daniya; Gazabu Belkeji, Gazabu Belkeji; Gazabu, Gazabu; G/Ajuji, G/Ajuji; Jukunawa I, G. S. S., Bali; Jukunawa II, Bali I Primary School; Sabon Dale, Sabon Dale |
| Bali | Gang Dole | G/Baken, G/Baken; G/Samen, G/Samen; Jobdi I, Ung Jobdi Daka; Jobdi II, Kampu; Nyawanti, Nyawanti; Nyinkusum, Nyinkusum; Sarkin Noma, Gdss, Dakka; Timjemi, Timjemi |
| Bali | Ganglari | Ganglari, Ganglari; Gang Duniyaro, Gang Duniyaro; Gang Sule, Gang Sule; Gang Kita, Gang Kita; J/Ibrahim, J/Ibahim; Jangare, Jangare |
| Bali | Gangtiba | Deukusum I, Deukusum; Deukusum II, Ang Abbo; Gang-Gira Dadoa; Gang Tiba, Tiba; Gang Tiba II, Sabon Layi; Mararraba Tukur, Namburki; Sarkin Mata, Sarkin Mata |
| Bali | Gang Mata | Binyiwa, Binyiwa; Gang Dan Bana, Gang Dan Bana; Gandan Bana II, Gangbon; Gang Wonjida, Gang Wonjida; Gang Pentom, Gang Pentom; Mirimiridonkolo, Mirimiridonkolo; Pamanga, Pamanga; Sabongida, Sabongida |
| Bali | Kaigama | B/Wurkum, B/Wurkum; Gang Furum, Gang Furum; J/Ali, J/Ali; J/Julde I, J/Julde; J/Julde II, J/Audi; J/Budowa, J/Budowa; J/Zubairu, J/Zubairu; J/Bello, J/Bello; J/Nabayi, J/Nabayi; J/Isa, Nyama Tamanda; Kankani, Kankani; Maibultu, Maibultu; M/Nyandam, M/Nyandam; S/Wurkum, Kwalbatigkwe; Sandaru, Sandaru; Y/Gang Shmen, Gang Shmen; Yayani Yusuf, Yayani Yusuf |
| Bali | Maihula | B/Jalo, B/Jalo; Dajeru, Dajeru; Dadinkowa, Dadinkowa; Garin Baki, Baki; K/Goro, K/Goro; K/Nyapo, Maihula G. Doruwa; K/Nyavo, K/Nyavo; K/Gang Nadere, K/Gang Nadere; Ladan, Ladan; Maikinta, Maikinta; M/Tonti, Tonti; Nahuta, Nahuta; Sabon Gida, Sabon Gida; Wurbo, Wurbo |
| Bali | Suntai | Danboyi, Danboyi; G/Garba Suntai, G/Garba; Gobir, Gobir; Garba Kungana, Garba Kungana; H/Zagah, H/Zagah; Ibrahim, Ibrahim; Jatau, Jatau; K/Damisa, K/Damisa; Kungana, Kungana; Kwassa, Kwassa; Kwassa Bariki, K/Bariki; Mamman, Mamman; Maikasuwa, Maikasuwa; Maikudi, Maikudi; Maigoge I, Maigoge; Maigoge II, Maigoge; M/Sarki, M/Sarki; M/Joji, M/Joji; S/Danko, S/Danko; T/Zaki, T/Saki |
| Bali | Takalafiya | Auyukawa, Takalafiya; Borno I, B/Primary School; Borno II, Borno II; Baba Juli, Baba Juli; Dali, Dali; Garwa, Garwa; Jalo, G/Jalo; Kara Ruwa I, K/Primary School; Kara Ruwa II, Kofan Liman; Katsina, Katsina; Malam Yero, Malam Yero; Takalafiya I, Gdss Takalafiya; Takalafiya II, Takalafiya; Yelwa, Yelwa |
| Donga | Akate | Akate I, Akate Primary School; Akate II, Akate Dispensary; Akate III, Akate Dispensary; Gbundu, Gbundu Primary School; Guruza, Guruza Primary School; Mbakumbol, Mbakumbol Village; Mbasa, Mbasa Village; Mbatura, Mbatura Village; K/S/Akate, Kofar Sarkin Akate; Kofar Sani, Kofar Sani; Tse Uda, Tse Uda Village; Tor Damisa, Tor Damisa Primary School |
| Donga | Asibiti | Ananum I, Ananum Primary School; Asibiti, Bakin Asibiti; Binga, Kofar Bakin Dakin Sama; Dogo, Dogo Primary School; Gbana, Kofar Gbana Donga; Gayam I, Kofar Gayam Donga; Gayam II, Kofar Gayam Donga; Gamiya, Kofar Gamiya Donga; Gargea, Kofar Gargea Donga; Madaki, Kofar Madaki; Nufu, Kofar Nufu; Lufu, Kofar Lufu; Shaakaa I, Shaakaa Primary School; Too, Kofar Sabo Too; Tongov, Tongov Primary School; Yerima, Kofar Yeriman Donga |
| Donga | Gayama | Asibiti, Kofar Asibiti; Bibinu I, Bibinu Primary School; Bibinu II, Kofar Yerima Donga; Benye, Benye Primary School; Fali, Fali Primary School; Gayama I, Kofar Sarkin Gayama; Gayama II, Gayama Primary School; Naah, S/Gida Naah Primary School; Nukpo, K/Sarkin Nukpo; T/Wada, Tudun Wada Primary School; Tachapa, Tachapa Primary School; Tatindoro, Tati-Ndoro Primary School |
| Donga | Gindin Dutse | Imudi I, Kofar Imudi I; Imudi II, Kofar Imudi II; Kumbo, Kofar Sarkin Kumbo; Madaki I, Kofar Madaki I, Kofar/ Sarkin Kumbo; Madaki II, Kofar Madaki II; Nyivu I, Kofar Sarkin Nyivu; Nyivu II, Kofar Primary School; Nyivu III, Gidan Markeri; Nyivu IV, Bakin Kasuwa; Sanso, Sanso Primary School; Tissa, Tissa Primary School; Uhwesi I, Kofar, Uhwesi; Uhwesi II, Kofar Uhwesi; Yerima I, Kofar Yerima I; Yerima II, Kofar Yerima II; Yerima III, Kofar Yerima III; Zambana, Zambana Primary School |
| Donga | Gyatta Aure | Church I, Dauda Kwancha Primary School; Church II, Dauda Kwancha Primary School; Church III, Dauda Kwancha Primary School; Liman, Kofar Liman; Musa Lafiya, Kofar Musa Lafiya; Massalachi, Kofar Massallachi; Rijiya, Bakin Rijiya |
| Donga | Bikadarko | Borkono, Borkono Primary School; Kadarko I, Kadarko Primary School; Kadarko II, Kofar Sarkin Kadarko; Sabon Gida, S/Gida Primary School; Tendega, Tendega Primary School; Utire, Utire Primary School |
| Donga | Mararraba | Asen, Asen; Gankwe Akah, Gankwe Akah; Gankwe Asen, Gankwe Asen; Gankwe Adamu, Gankwe Adamu; Garleya, Garleya Primary School; Gindin Dutse, Gindin Dutse; Ido, Kofar Ido; Jatau Jibawa, Jatau Jibawa Primary School; Kasimu, Kofar Kasimu; Maiangwa Gankwe, K/Maiangwa Gankwe; Nukunya, Nukunya Primary School; Ndessin, Ndessin; Sarkin Buban, Kofar Sarkin Buban; Yabe, Kofar Yabe; Yusuf, Kofar Yusuf |
| Donga | Nyita | Madaki, Kofar Madaki; Nwuwha I, Kofar Yerima Nwuhwa; Nwuwha II, Nwuwha Primary School; Nyimui I, Nyimui Primary School; Nyimui II, K/Sarkin Nyimui; Nyabe, Kofar Sarkin Nyabe; Nyite I, Kofar Sarkin Nyite; Nyite II, Kofar Sarkin Nyite; Sabo, K/Sarkin Sabo; Tsoho, Nyita Primary School |
| Gashaka | Galumjina | Abba Dogo, Abba Dogo; Balewa, Balewa; Bodel, Bodel; Galumjina, Galumjina; Gamen, Gamen; Sarkin Ruwa, Sarkin Ruwa |
| Gashaka | Gangumi | Afengi, Afengi; Gangumi I Primary School; Gangumi II, Kofai; Gangti, Gangti; Gang Bong I, Gang Bong; Gang Bong II, Gang Bong; Gangumi Iormba, Gangumi Iormba; Garin Tiv, Garin Tiv; Kare, Kare; Keme, Keme; Kwagir, Kwagiri Primary School |
| Gashaka | Garbabi | Bashi Shir I, Bashi Shir; Bashi Shir II, Kunagab; Duna, Duna; Garbabi I Primary School; Garbabi II Market Square; Jauro Jalo, Jauro Jalo; Kabari Bature, Kabarin Bature; Ung. Ajayi, Ung. Ajayi; Upper Waya, Primary School |
| Gashaka | Gashaka | Chabbal Dalang, Chabbal Dalang; Chabbal Hendu, Chabbal Hendu; Filinga, Filinga; Gashaka, Primary School; Mayo Yuem, Mayo Yuem; Selbe, Selbe |
| Gashaka | Jamtari | Adda Goro, Adda Goro; Jamtari I, Primary School; Jamtari II, Nyibango; Karamti I, Primary School; Karamti II, Koti; Kwaitap, Kwaitap; Mayo Jamtari, M/Jamtari; Salama, Salama |
| Gashaka | Mai-Idanu | Bam I, Bam; Bam II, Mai-Idanu; Dakare, Dakare; Gindin Dutse Primary School; Mbar Mataya, Mbar Mataya; Mayo Sabere, Mayo Sabere |
| Gashaka | Mayo Selbe | Goje I Primary School; Goje II, Likwal; Mayo Jarandi, Mayo Jarandi; Mayo Selbe I, M. O. W.; Mayo Selbe II, Lara Asha; M/Selbe Primary School, Primary School |
| Gashaka | Serti 'A' | Central Primary School, Central Primary School; Kofar Fada I, Kofar Fada; Kofar Fada II, Kofar Fada; Kofar Fada III, Ung. Isa; L. G. Dispensary, L. G. Dispensary; Min. Of Agric. I, Min. Of Agric; Min. Of Agric. II, Tudun Wada |
| Gashaka | Serti 'B' | Alpha Clinic, Alpha Clinic; Dadin Kowa I Primary School; Dadin Kowa II Primary School; Mammy Market I, Mammy Market; Mammy Market II, Mammy Market; Sabon Gari, Sabon Gari; Township Stadium, Township Stadium; Verterinary Clinic, Verterinary Clinic |
| Gassol | Gassol | Anguwan Ardo, Ang. Ardo; Ang. Adamu, Ang Adamu Gassol; Ang. Badija, Badija I; Ang. Bose Gassol; Garin Shuaibu, G/Shuaibu; Gassol, Gassol; Jiru, Ung Jiru; Kanti, Kanti; Karal, Ung. Karal; Kir, Ang. Kir; Kwatan Taru, K/Taru; Sokko Tawa, Sokko Tawa; Toro Janga, Toro Janga; Umaru I, Ang. Umaru I; Umaru II, Ang. Umaru II (Badija); Upper Benue, Upper Benue; Wuro Kesum K/Maigari |
| Gassol | Gunduma | Abuja, Abuja; Baba Also, Kofan Maigari; Barjanga, Kofan Maigari; Chul I, Sabon Dale; Chul II, Chul II; Doron Wurkum, Fulani/Wurkum; Garin Atiku, Kofan Maigari; Garin Bappa, Kofan Maigari; Garin Bature, Kofan Maigari; Garin Gidado, Kofan Maigari; Garin Kiyari, Kofan Maigari; Garin Yelwa, Kofan Maigari; Gorondo, Kofan Maigari; Gunduma, Kasuwan Gunduma; Gurowa, Kofan Maigari; Hamari, Kofan Maigari; Kawo Gilo, Kofan Maigari; Kuka, Kofan Maigari; Lariski, Kofan Maigari; L/Kawu, Kofan Maigari; Magaji I, Kofan Maigari; Magaji II, Kofan Baba; Makama, Kofan Maigari; Makurna, Kofan Maigari; Nabayi, Kofan Maigari; Nawankala, Kofan Baba; San Daru, Kofan Gomben Doka; Wanka, Kofan Maigari; Ya Yani I, Kofan Maigari; Ya Yani II, Kofan Masallachi |
| Gassol | Mutum Biyu I | Achi Arage, Achi Arage; Dalhatu I, Central Primary School; Dalhatu II, Central Primary School; Dalhatu III, Central Primary School; Jan Taro, K/Mai Ang. Jantaro; Julde I, K/Alhaji Tukura; Julde II, K/Alhaji Tukura; Kwatan Nanido, Kofan S/Kwata; Shanu I, Central Primary School; Shanu II, Central Primary School; Umaru I, Kofan Mai Ang. Umaru; Umaru II, Ung. Tike |
| Gassol | Mutum Biyu II | Alhassan I, K/Malam Barde; Alhassan II, K/Mallam Barde; Hussaini, Kofan Adamu; Isa I, Gindin Mangoro; Isa II, Kofan Yaya Manu; Jauro, Kofan Malam Muazu; Jenjo B., Kofan Babalau; Jibir I, Kofan Malam Yakubu; Jibir II, Kofan Yusuf Mazawaje; Lawan, Kofan Sarki; Rafin Sanyi, Kofan Sarkin Tiv; Sani I, Kofan Sani I; Sani II, Masallachi Izala Nafarko |
| Gassol | Nam Nai | Auta, G/Auta; Bada Koshi I, Bada Koshi I; Bada Koshi II, Bada Koshi II; Bayel, G/Bayel; Bungel, G/Bungel; Dinawol, Dinawol; Galadima, Galadima; Garin Ali, Garin Ali; Garin Abba I, G/Abba I; Garin Abba II, G/Abba II; Garin Malam Abba II, Mallam Abba II; Garin Muazu, Ung. M. Muazu; Jauro Bappa, Jauro Bappa; Koppi, Koppi; Buba Liman K/Maigari; Kofan Maigemu, Kofan Maigemu; Kawari K/Maigari; Kwatan Mutuwa K/Maigari; Namnai I K/Maigari; Namnai II Central Pry. School; Ndayaro K/Maigari; Sabon Gida, S/Gida I; Sabon Gida, S/Gida II; T. Labaran, T/Labaran; Tsin Tsiya, Tsin Tsiya; Tura Turakeke, T. Turakeke; Tim Tim K/Maigari; Ung. U. Nareje, Ung. Nareje; Ung. U. Siddi, Ung. Siddi; Ung. U. Yakubu, Ung. U. Yakubu |
| Gassol | Sarkin Shira | Bakin Kasuwa, Bakin Kasuwa; Dan Baki, Ung. Dan Baki; Garin Abdullahi; Garin Almajiri, Garin Almajiri; Garin Jibir, Unguwa Danbaki; Garin Kabo, Garin Kabo; Ibrahim Yandang K/Maigari; Jauro Barde, Jauro Barde; Jauro Bello, Jauro Bello; Jauro Haruna, Jauro Haruna; Jauro Manu I, Jauro Manu I; Jauro Manu II, Jauro Manu II; Jauro Tape, Jauro Tape; Jauro Usman, Jauro Usman; Kofan Debo, Kofan Debo; Lomodu, Lomodu; Nyamata, Nyamata Manda; Sabon Gida, Sabon Gida; Samari Atam, S/Atam; U/Aji, Ung. U. Aji; U/Ufeshigo K/Maigari, U/Feshigo Pry. School; Wuro Abba, Wuro Abba |
| Gassol | Sendirde | Bakin Kasuwa, Domayo Babba; Dutse Num, K/Maiangun Dutse; Gotoru, K/M Bako; Gungun Bodel, K/M Saidu; Kofan Jauro, Domayo Karami; Madaki, K/Mai Ung. Madaki; Ndiyanwo, Mai Ang. Mamuda; Ngo Som I, Kofan Mai Ung.; Ngo Som II, K/Mai Ung. Tanko Natirde; Sendirde I, Kofan Sarki; Sendirde II, Ung. Ahmadu I; Sendirde III, Ung. Ahmadu II; Wuro Bokki, Kofan Miji; Wurbo, Kofan Ardido; Yahaya, Kofan Yahaya |
| Gassol | Tutare | Bahago, Kofan Mai Anguwa Bahago; G/Ali, Garin Ali; G/Bello, Garin Bello; G/Dare, Tutare Tsohuwa; G/Mumuye, Garin Salei; Manji I, K/Jauro Gagga; Manji II, Ang. Kachalla; Manji III, Jauron Manji; Sheka I, K/Sarkin Sheka; Sheka II, Bakin Tudu Sheka; Taka Fulani, Taka Fulani; Taka Jauro, Ang. Jatau; T/Kirim, Ang. Kirim; T/Mashi, Garin Tukura; Taka Wurkum I, Kofan Jauro Taka; Taka Wurkum II, K/Jauro; Tutare I, Kofan Sarki; Tutare II, Dinawa |
| Gassol | Wurojam | Abada, Gidan Abada; Aguraga I, Kofan Mai Ung. Saidu; Aguraga II, Gidan Aguraga; Ahamadu, Kofan Mai Gari; Ayah, Kofan Mai Ung. Aya; Gindin Kogi, Kofan Mai Ung. G. Kogi; Gwiwan Kogi I, Kofan Mai Ung. G. Kogi I; Gwiwan Kogi II, Kofan Mallam Sale; Gwiwan Kogi III Kofan Hussaini Garba; Ku Fai, Kofan Mai Ung. Kufai; Kwara, Gidan Maigari; Sale, Kofan Sale; Salihu, Kofan Salihu; San Sani I, K/Mai Anguwa Salihu; San Sani II, K/Sarkin; Shomoulu, Kofan Mai Ung. S/Layi; Toro Ajo, Gidan Shapura; Wuro Jam I, Kofan Sarki; Wuro Jami II, Kofan Alhaji Abin Allah |
| Gassol | Wuryo | Dissol I, K. Shuaibu; Dobeli I, K Mai Anguwa Kaddo; Dobeli II, K. Shuaibu; Dundewa, K/Mai Ang. Shumo; Jitama I, K/Danladi; Jitama II, K. Gebi; K/Bana I, K. Hamma Haram; K/Bana II, K/Danjuma; Njiddawo I, Mai Ang. Lawal; Njiddawo II, Malam Adam; Njiddawo III, Gidado Salihu; Njiddawo IV, K/Gambo Sandaru; S/Dogo, S/Dogo; Sumaye, K/Nuhu; Tella I, Bubakari Hayatu; Tella II, K/Mai Anguwa Buba; Tella III, Tella Primary School; Tella IV, Njiddawo Primary School; Tella V, Kofan Philibus Daniel; Tonga I, Mai Ang. Sulei; Tonga II, K/Idrisu; Wuryo I, Kofan Sarkin Wuryo; Wuryo II, Kofan Malam Usman; Wuryo III, Kofan Abdullahi; Wuryo IV, Gidin Tsamiya; Y/Baba, Kofan Mal. Baba Doubeli; Y/Magaji, Kofan A. Yawale/Doubeli |
| Gassol | Yarima | Anema, Kofan Jauro Muhammadu; Bembal, Dispensary; Danbazau, Kofan Jauro Mai Kano; Gagara, Kofan Jauro; Garko, Kofan Adamu Garko; Garin Karfe, Kofan Jauro; Gildi, Kwanan Gwangola; Gonori, Kofan Masallachi; Jauro Tumbe, Kofan Alhaji Sule; Mummuye Yerima, Ung. Mumuyawa; Nata Ala, Kofan Yahaya; Nguddufa, Kofan Yola Kareji; Sarkin Noma, Kofan Baba Also; Tudun Wada, Kofan Yerima; Yaya Dudu, Kofan Adamuja; Yola, Kofan Sarki; Yun Kum, Kofan Mai Anguwa |
| Ibi | Dampar I | Galadima, Kofar Galadima; Gidan Ishaku, Gidan Ishaku; Hamman, Kofan Hamman; Korijo, Un Guwan Korijo; Tsoho, Kofan Tsoho; Waziri, Kofan Waziri |
| Ibi | Dampar II | Dali/Mavo, Mavo; Haruna Alhaji, Haruna Alhaji; Kurmi I, G/Dudu; Kurmi II, G/Dudu Sauri; Mala, Mala Primary School; Ruwan Dan Baki, Ruwan Dan Baki |
| Ibi | Dampar III | Dan Giwa I, Gidan Dan Giwa; Dan Giwa II, Kofan Maianguwa; Danwase, Danwase; Kogin Wase, Kogin Wase Primary School; Kotso Babba, Kotso Babba; Maje Biyu, Maje Biyu; Tabga, Tabga Primary School |
| Ibi | Ibi Nwonyo I | Alh. Babajo, Kofan Sarkin Makera; Alh. Maida I, Kofan Alh. Maida; Alh. Maida II, Kofan Bala Maye; Baba Burema I, Town Dispensary; Baba Burema II, Kofan Sarkin Hanya; Gungun Abdullahi, Kofar Mai Anguwa; Kofar Sarkin Ibi, Kofar Sarkin Ibi; Kofar Waini, Kofar Makera; Madakin Pawa, Kofar Adamu Jaki; Madakin Taru, Kofar Madakin Taru; Musa Manaja Dampar, Kofar Musa Manaja; Tafida, Kofar Tafida; Waziri, Kofar Waziri Bannu |
| Ibi | Ibi Nwonyo II | Alh. Tammah I, Kofar Maito; Alh. Tammah II, Kofar Yakubu Masunchi; Dan Buram, Kofar Aboki Dan Buram; Gazor, Gazor Primary School; Haruna Mashi, Haruna Mashi; Ibua, Ibua Primary School; Jigawa, Jigawan Gyada; Kabawa Rice Mill I, Kofar Malam Yahaya; Kabawa Rice Mill II, Kofar Nakabo; Moti, Moti Primary School; Mohammadu Fari, Kofar Mohammadu Fari; Tudun Wada, Tudun Wada Primary School; Ortuma, Zangon Kaya |
| Ibi | Ibi Rimi Uku I | Abdu Afto I, Kofar Abdu Afto; Abdu Afto II, Kofar Dan Dada Mahauchi; Abdu Kano Kanje, Kofar Shehi; Ali Sarkin Pawa I, Kofar Baba Dan Yaro; Ali Sarkin Pawa II, Kofar Sarkin Kwata; Kofar Danlami Na'Ibi, Kofar Mallam Na'Ibi; Islamiya, Islamiya Primary School; Kauyen Isa, Kofar Maianguwa; Sarkin Aska, Kofar Sarkin Aska; Sankira, Kofar Sankira; Sarkin Tasha, Kofar Sarkin Tasha |
| Ibi | Ibi Rimi Uku II | Bakyu, Bakyu Primary School; Dan Kamata, Gidan Boko; Gindin Waya, Gindin Waya Primary School; Kwagh Ngu, Kauyen Kwagh Ngu |
| Ibi | Sarkin Kudu I | Galadima, Kofar Galadima; Madaki, Kofar Madaki; Masu Maidawa, Anguwar Masu; Sarkin Baka, Kofar Sarkin Baka; Yameer, Gidan Yameer |
| Ibi | Sarkin Kudu II | Dorowan Kpenuen, Dorowa Primary School; Garba Angas I, Sabon Layi; Garba Angas II, Double Corner; Hassan Jarawa, Rafin Damisa; Kwamar, Kwamar Primary School |
| Ibi | Sarkin Kudu III | Bakaan, Kofar Bakaan; Dooshima, Dooshima Primary School; Gishirin Hassan, Gishirin Hassan Dispensary; Sule Ago, Gurbin Dutse; Tor Adi, Tor Adi; Tor Kange I, Tor Kange; Tor Kange II, Kofar Garba Wanzami; Uzer, Uzer Primary School |
| Jalingo | Abbare Yelwa | Abbare, Abbare Primary School; Jauro Noghau, Jauro Noghau; Jauro Shafo, Jauro Shafo; Panti Mbijawa, Panti Mbijawa; Yelwa Gabas, Kofan Jauro; Yelwa Yamma, Yelwa Yamma |
| Jalingo | Barade | Anguwan Adamu Baba, Anguwan Adamu Baba; Garin Magami, Garin Magami; Kofan Baba Siniya, Kofan Baba Siniya; Kofan Bashir, Kofan Bashir; Kofan Daguma, Kofan Daguma; Kofan Goshi Kafinta, Kofan Goshi Kafinta; Kofan Jika Muri, Kofan Jika Muri; Kofan Maizare, Kofan Maizare I; Kofan Maizare, Kofan Maizare II; Kofan Malam Idi, Kofan Malam Idi; Kofan Noku Kona, Kofan Noku Kona; Kofan Sabon Sarki, Kofan Sabon Sarki; Kofan Wakili Buba, Kofan Wakili Buba; Kofan Wakili Tasha, Kofan Wakili Tasha; Magami Primary School, Magami Primary School I; Magami Primary School, Magami Primary School II; Mohammed Tukur Primary School, Mohammed Tukur Primary School I; Mohammed Tukur Primary School, Mohammed Tukur Primary School II; Mohammed Tukur Primary School, Mohammed Tukur Primary School III; Unguwan Usman, Unguwan Usman |
| Jalingo | Kachalla Sembe | Anguwan Shonfo, Anguwan Shonfo; Jauro Yunusa, Jauro Yunusa; Kasuwan Rumfa, Kasuwan Rumfa; Korkayel, Korkayel; Malam Gabdo, Kofan Malam Gabdo; Malam Gabdo, Anguwan Yandang; Primary Board, Primary Board; Sabon Gari Primary School, Sabon Gari Primary School; Wuro Musa, Wuro Musa; Wuro Sembe, Wuro Sembe Primary School |
| Jalingo | Kona | Anguwan Gullum, Anguwan Gullum; Anguwan Kaigama, Kona Primary School; Anguwan Sarkin Kona, Kona Primary School I; Anguwan Sarkin Kona, Kona Primary School II; F. G. G. C., F. G. G. C.; Howai Primary School, Honai Primary School I; Hawai Primary School, Honai Primary School II; Jauro Abi, Jauro Abi; Janbambu, Janbambu; Jauro Tippi, Jauro Tippi; Jekono Hou, Jekonohou; Lakagana, Lakagana; Minda Lavozing, Minda Lavozing; Murkuni, Murkuni; Murtai, Murtai; Nukkai Primary School, Nukkai Primary School I; Nukkai Primary School, Nukkai Primary School II; Panti Shombo, Panti Shombo; Yawai, Yawai; State Secretariat, State Secretariat I; State Secretariat, State Secretariat II |
| Jalingo | Majidadi | Anguwan Musa, Kofan Mai Anguwa Musa; Alhassan Saurara, Kofan Alhassan Saurara; Gajere Kunzang, Gajere Kunzang; Kofan Chiroma, Kofan Shaibu Maialbasa; Kofan Musa Makeri, Kofan Musa Makeri; Kofan Sani Baban Lare, Kofan Sani Baban Lare; Kofan Usman Jiru, Kofan Usman Jiru; Kofan Zubairu, Kofan Zubairu Abubakar; Kofan Yakubu, Kofan Yakubu Maijaki; Kofan Malam Ladan; Kofan Maqeri; Mafindi Primary School, Mafindi Primary School I; Mafindi Primary School, Mafindi Primary School II; Mafindi Primary School, Mafindi Primary School III; Sale Gurka, Kofan Sale Gurka; Tudun Wada, Tudun Wada |
| Jalingo | Mayo Goi | Ali Dankum, Ali Dankum I; Ali Dankum, Ali Dankum II; Anguwan Shanu, Anguwan Shanu; Model Primary School, Model Primary School; Gindin Doruwa, Gindin Doruwa I; Gindin Doruwa, Gindin Doruwa II; Gidin Doruwa, Kofan Alhaji Ba; Government College, Jalingo, Government College, Jalingo; Hassan Primary School, Hassan Primary School I; Hassan Primary School, Hassan Primary School II; Hassan Primary School, Hassan Primary School III; Jauro Mashi, Jauromashi I; Jauro Mashi, Jauromashi II; Kofar Mallam Sani, Kofar Mallam Sani; Wuro Tanvo, Wuro Tanvo |
| Jalingo | Sarkin Dawaki | Blind Workshop, Blind Workshop; Kasuwan Yelwa, Kasuwan Yelwa; Kofan Ali Karofi, Kofan Dinga; Kofan Baraya, Kofan Baraya; Kofan Tallafi, Kofan Tallafi I; Kofan Tallafi, Kofan Tallafi II; Lamorde Primary School, Lamorde Primary School; Lamorde Primary School, Kofan Tafida |
| Jalingo | Sintali | Bayan Gidan M. Abi, Bayan Gidan M. Abi; Bayan Gidan Lawan, Bayan Gidan Lawan; Kofan Lawan Tela, Kofan Lawan Tela; Kofan Sintali, Kofan Sintali; Kofan Yusuf, Kofan Yusuf; Kofan Zubairu Jen, Kofan Zubairu Jen |
| Jalingo | Turaki 'A' | District Office, District Office I; District Office, District Office II; District Office, District Office III; Gindin Rimi, Gindin Rimi; Gindin Rimi, Kofan Sambo Donki; Gindin Rimi, Kofan Alhaji Garke; Kofan Gajawa, Kofan Gajawa I; Kofan Gajawa, Kofan Gajawa II; Kofan Malam Bobbo, Kofan Malam Bobbo; Kofan Wakili Malle, Kofan Wakili Malle; Mohammed Nya Primary School, Mohammed Nya Primary School I; Mohammed Nya Primary School, Mohammed Nya Primary School II; Mohammed Nya Primary School, Mohammed Nya Primary School III; Mohammed Nya Primary School, Mohammed Nya Primary School IV; Mohammed Nya Primary School, Mohammed Nya Primary School V; Mohammed Nya Primary School, Mohammed Nya Primary School VI |
| Jalingo | Turaki 'B' | Bashin Layi, Bashin A. Gajawa; Central Primary School, Central Primary School I; Central Primary School, Central Primary School II; Central Primary School, Central Primary School III; Fire Service, Fire Service Office I; Fire Service, Fire Service Office II; Nyama Sala, Nyama Sala; Sabon Gari, Sabon Gari |
| Karim-Lamido | Amar | Ang. Baba Tatu, Ang. Baba Tatu; Ang. Bariki, Bariki; Ang. Binari, Ang. Binnari; Karim B, Unguwan Kaigama; Ang. Damara/Yamusa, Damara/Yamusa; Ang. Dari Ganaka, Dari Ganaka; Ang. Danari/Amashi, Damari/Amashi; Ang. Kurungu, Kurungu; Ang. Mahmuda, Ang. Mahmuda; Ang. Sambo, Ang. Sambo; Ang. Siddiki/Ardo Tio, Ango. Siddiki/Ardo Tio; Ang. Velango, Ang. Velango; Ang. Wakili, Ang Wakili |
| Karim-Lamido | Andamin | Ang. Balarabe, Ang. Balarabe; Ang. Baraya, Ang. Baraya; Ang. Bello Kunshenu, Ang. Bello Kunshenu; Ang. Damka/R. Zafi, Damka/R. Zafi; Ang. G/Ndela, Ang. G/Ndela; Ang. Jauro Wadata, Ang. Jauro Wadata; Ang. Jeb-Jeb/Y, Kura, Ang. Jeb-Jeb/Y. Kura; Ang. Kombodoro, Ang. Kombodoro; Ang. Kuka Ubandoma I, Ang. Kuka Ubandoma; Ang. Kuka Ubandoma II, Ang. Kuka Urbandoma; Ang. Kwatan Jen, Ang. Kwatanjen; Ang. Maisamari I, Ang. Maisamari; Ang. Maisamari II, Ang. Maisamari; Ang. Tafida, Ang. Tafida; Ang. Telajugu, Ang. Telajugu; Ang. Yaburo/Damare, Ang. Yaburo/Damare; Ang. Yerima Galadima, Ang. Yerima Galadima; Ang. Zani/Gwati/Ubandoma, Ang. Zani/Gwati/Ubandoma |
| Karim-Lamido | Bachama | Ang. Angule, Ang. Angule; Ang. Anjoddo, Ang. Anjoddo; Ang. J. Ali, Ang. J. Ali; Ang. J. Bayero/Gorjo, Ang. J. Bayero/Gorjo; Ang. J. Manga, Ang. J. Manga; Ang. Kakkala, Ang. Kakkala; Ang. Mal. Shehu, Ang. Mallam Shehu; Ang. Para, Ang. Para; Ang. Pareje, Ang. Pareje; Ang. Sarki Maidoki, Ang. Sarki Maidoki; Ang. Senge, Ang. Senge; Ang. Turban/Yakubu, Ang. Turban/Yakubu; Ang. Wakili, Ang. Wakili |
| Karim-Lamido | Bikwin | Ung. Adamu, Ung. Adamu; Ung. Ardido/Dan, Ardido/Dan; Ung. Bello Abba, Bello Abba; Ung. Daura, Ung. Daura; Ung. Gandara, Ung. Gandara; Ung. Galadima/Suye, Galadima/Suye; Ung. Isa Yohanna, Isa Yohanna; Ung. Ishaku Abba, Ishaku Abba; Ung. Iskadare/Ali, Iskadare/Ali; Ung. Kamuel, Kamuel; Ung. Nanzo, Nanzo; Ung. Sarkin Loh, Sarkin Loh; Ung. Sarkin Panya, Sankin Panya; Ang. Wawa/Dutse, Wawa/Dutse; Ung. Yamdi/Siman, Munga Lelo; Ung. Yusufu Dogo, Yusufu Dogo |
| Karim-Lamido | Darofai | Ang. Atiku/Hausawa, Ang. Atiku/Hausawa; Ang. Baka Yala/Hussaini, Ang. Baka Yala/Hussaini; Ang. Baraya, Ang. Baraya; Ang. Dogoro/Sau-Sau; Ang. Galadima/Kau, Ang. Galadima/Kau; Ang. Gwalak/Sambo, Ang. Gwalak/Sambo; Ang. Isa Loba/Mai Lafiya, Ang. Isa Loba/Mai Lafiya; Ang. J. Bakari/Bayam, J. Bakari/Bayam; Ang. Kofar Bayam, Ang. Kofar Bayam; Ang. Likita/Hospital, Likita/Hospital; Ang. Mingeh, Ang. Mingeh; Ang. Sallah/Ibrahim, Ang. Sallah/Ibrahim; Ang. Sambo/Adamu, Sambo/Adamu; Ang. S/Bambur I, Ang. S/Bambur; Ang. S/Bambur II, Ang. S/Bambur; Ang. S/Mamman, Ang. S/Mamman; Ang. T. Sallah, Ang. T. Sallah; Ang. Y. T. Usman, Ang. Y. T. Usman |
| Karim-Lamido | Didango | Ang. Badakoshi, Ang. Badakoshi; Ang. Balasa, Ang. Balasa; Ang. Bakodoge/Manzo, Ang. Bakodoge/Manzo; Ang. Galadima/Jukun, Ang. Galadima/Jukun; Ang. Gajere/J. Ardo, Ang. G. J/Ardo; Ang. Habu Garo, Ang. Habu Garo; Ang. Hausawa I, Ang. Hausawa; Ang. Hausawa II, Ang. Hausawa; Ang. Ibrahim J., Ang. Ibahim J.; Ang. Ishaku, Ang. T. Ishaku; Ang. Laro, Ang. Laro; Ang. Nasarawa, Ang. Nasarawa; Ang. Shomo Nbai, Ang. Shomo Nbai; Ang. S. Jukun, Ang. S. Jukun; Ang. Wambai, Ang. Wambai |
| Karim-Lamido | Jen Ardido | Ung. Adi Haman, Adi Haman; Ung. Ardo Dogo, Ung. Ardo Dogo; Ung. Ardo Tashi, Ung. Ardo Tashi; Ung. Bado Shata, Ung. Bado Shata; Ung. Bitrus, Ung. Bitrus; Ung. Doyi/Sali, Doyi/Sale; Ung. Fitowa, Ung. Fitowa; Ung. Gwamna, Ung. Gwamna; Ung. Hausawa, Ung. Hausawa; Ung. Jiman, Ung. Jiman; Ung. Kachala, Ung. Kachala; Ung. Musa Shehu, Musa Shehu; Ung. Sarkin Jen/Harisu, Sarkin Jen/Harisu |
| Karim-Lamido | Jen Kaigama | Ung. Balarabe, Sarkin Jen; Ung. Danara, Sabon Gari; Ung. Danbera, Saredou; Ung. Gaga/Dutse, Saredou; Ung. Galadima, Sabon Gari Jen; Ung. Jaburi/Nwamin, Bambuka; Ung. Kabiyan/Didah, Bambuka; Ung. Kadah, Saredou Jen; Ung. Lamba/Betam, Dadiya; Ung. Sada 'A', Saredou Jen; Ung. Sadah 'B', Saredou Jen; Umaru, Sabon Gari Jen; Umaru/Duni, Sabongari Jen; Zaki, Dadiya; Zang, Bambuka; Zanya, Bambuka |
| Karim-Lamido | Karim \A\' | Ung. Ahmadu, Ung. Ahmadu I; Ung. Ahmadu, Ung. Ahmadu II; Ung. Ajiya, Ung. Ajiya; Ang. Ajiya Usmanu, Ajiyan Usmanu; Ung. Aminu, Ung. Aminu; Ung. Dare, Ung. Dare; Ung. Gagare, Ung. Gagare; Ung. Galadima, Ung. Galadima; Ung. Garba, Ung. Garba; Ung. Kachala, Ung. Kachala; Ung. Lawan Buki, Lawan Buki; Ung. Maikasada, Ung. Maikasada; Sarkin Yamma, Sarkin Yamma; Ung. Yidi, Ung. Yidi |
| Karim-Lamido | Karim \B\' | Ung. Barde Hamidu, Ung. Barde Hamidu; Ung. Buba/Ali, Ung. Buba/Ali; Ung. Gwenzu/Jacob, Gwenzu/Jacob; Ung. Kaigama, Ung. Kaigama; Ung. Kaigama Jatau, Kaigama Jatau; Ung. Likita Baba, Likita Baba; Ung. Manzo, Ung. Manzo; Ung. Niye, Ung. Niye; Ung. Yakubu, Ung. Yakubu; Ung. Yakubu/Mambilo, Yakubu/Mambilo; Ung. Yusufu Chiroma, Yusufu Chiroma |
| Karim-Lamido | Kwanchi | Ang. Audu Ali, Ang. Audu Ali; Ang. Baba Dogo, Ang. Baba Dogo; Ang. Buro, Ang. Buro; Ang. Chiroma, Ang. Chiroma; Ang. Dinya/Nayi, Dinya/Nayi; Ang. Hamza, Ang. Hamza; Ang. Maikano, Ang. Maikano; Ang. Passali, Ang. Passali; Ang. Piribi, Ang. Piribi; Ang. Sabongari/Sallah, Sabongari/Sallah; Ang. Sau Dogari, Ang. Sau Dogari; Ang. Shamaki, Ang. Shamaki; Ang. Umaru/Dukule, Ang Buro |
| Kurmi | Abong | Abong I, Primary School; Abong II, Abong G. D. S. S.; Abonyere, Abonyere Primary School; Akumbo, Akumbo Village; Chon, Chon Village; Gidan Makeri, Kofar Mai Unguwa; Gidan Isa, Gidan Isa Village Hall; Mbissa, Mbissa Village; Yaboro, Yaboro Village |
| Kurmi | Akwento/Boko | Affo, Kofar Mai Anguwa; Aforobe, Kofar Mai Anguwa; Akuwo, Kofar Mai Anguwa; Akwanwe Central Primary School; Akwabe, Akwabe Primary School; Akoforo, Akoforo Primary School; Akonko, Akonko Primary School; Batu Amanda, B/Amanda Hall; Batu Kamino, B/Kamino Hall; Buru, Buru Primary School; Gidan Ardo Umaru, Kofar Maiangwa; Gidan Mbate, Kofar Maiangwa; Kan-Iyaka, Kan-Iyaka Primary School; Ndombo Useni, Ndombo Useni Primary School; Ndombo Tolori, Ndombo Tolori Primary School; Nyakwe, Kofar Maiangwa; Zabe, Zabe Primary School; Zokwe, Zokwe Primary School |
| Kurmi | Ashuku/Eneme | Adobe, Adobe Town Hall; Ambwe/Mbisu, Ambwe, Mbisu Town Hall; Ashuku I, Ashiku Town Hall; Apikoni, Kofar Mai Unguwa; Gidan Maiguru, Kofar Mai Unguwa; Gunduma, Kofar Reka; Kara Ruwa, Kofar Mai Anguwa; Nama Baba I, Kofar Wakili; Nama Baba II/Abonbiya, Abonbiya Village; Nama Gangare, Kofar Mai Anguwa |
| Kurmi | Baissa | Baissa Central, Central Primary School; Baissa East, Baissa Town Hall; Baissa North, Baissa North Primary School; Baissa Village Head I, Chief Palace; Baissa Village Head II/ Kofar Maikidi, Kofar Maikidi; Bible College, Bible College; District Head I, Kofar District Head; Gidan Mallam, Kofar Adamu Ataga; Kpawula, Kofar Danladi Gimba; Yalkum, Kofar Mai Anguwa Ayara |
| Kurmi | Bente/Galea | Bada Koshi, Kofar Mai Unguwa; Bente/Galea I, Bente/ Primary School; Bente/Galea II, Galea; Bente-Sama, Bakin Kasuwa; Fali, Kofar Isa; Sarkin Boka, Kofar Audu; Shuwaka, Kofar Maiangwa; Sunkuru, Kofar Mai Yaki |
| Kurmi | Bissaula | Akpo, Akpo Primary School; Bissaula I, Kofar Sanda Maigida; Bissaula II, Opp. Police Station; Gatari I, Gatari Primary School; Gatari II, Bakin Kasuwa; Mai Samari, Kofar Mai Anguwa; Sunkuru/Agabi, Bakin Kasuwa |
| Kurmi | Didan | Dan Beki I, Kofar Maiangwa; Danbeki II, Primary School; Didan I, Kofar Yusuf; Didan II, Kofar Bello; Dindan III, Didan Primary School; Gidan Ali, Kofar Mai Anguwa; Gidan Mailamba, Kofar Mai Anguwa; Gidan Shaju, Kofar Elisha; Gidan Tukura I, Kofar Umaru; Gidan Tukura II, Kofar Gambo; Gidan Waya, Kofar Maianguwa; Gidan Yamusa, Kofar Nuhu |
| Kurmi | Ndaforo/Geanda | Akutukwe, Kofar Maianguwa; Gagara, Kofar Maianguwa; Gwanda I, Kofar Maiangwa; Gwanda II/Tundun Haske, Tundun Haske; Kufai Ndaforo, Kofar Maiangwa; Ndaforo I, Town Hall; Ndaforo II, Kofar Maianguwa; Ndaforo III, Kofar Garba Umaru; Ndaforo IV, Kofar Sarki Samari; Ndaforo Vdutse, Kofar Mai Anguwa; Tafare, Kofar Maianguwa; Tsokuwa Kofar Village Head |
| Kurmi | Njuwande | Akiya I, Kofar Maiangwa; Ambo, Ambo Primary School; Amburu, Amburu Primary School; Asha I, Bakin Kasuwa; Asha II, Asha Primary School; Asha III, Kofan Maianguwa Joseph; Asha IV/Gindan Yelwa, Gindan Yelwa; Atta, Atta Primary School; Chandam, Bakin Kasuwa; Maihula, Kofar Maianguwa |
| Kurmi | Nyido/Tosso | Chibong, Kofar Maiangwa; Danbeki, G. Mangoro/K. Manti; Kufai, Kofar Mai Anguwaali; Kufai South, Kofar Adamu Mainasara; Naka Gbara, Kasuwa; Nyido I, K/Magaji Alu; Nyido II, Kofar Maianguwa; Mubi Tosso, Kasuwa; Tosso, Kofar Dakashi |
| Lau | Abbare I | Ahmadu I / Abbare Pri. Sch.; Ahmadu II, Abbare Primary School; Fulani Market, Fulani Market; Hassan, Kofar Hassan; Paliya, Paliya |
| Lau | Abbere II | Bujum Kasuwa, Bujum Primary School; Bujum Waya, Bujum Waya; G. D. S. S. I, Government Day Secondary School; G. D. S. S. II, Government Day Secondary School; Kwamiding, Kwamiding; Sabon Gida, Sabon Gida Primary School; Tana Babba, Tana Babba Primary School; Yitti, Yitti Primary School |
| Lau | Donadda | Ardido Mako, Ardido Primary School; Buba Umaru, Kofar Buba Umaru; Bwei Nyankweley, Bwei Primary School; Donadda Primary School, Donadda Primary School; Garin Borori, Baba Gasa; Hamman Bura, Kofar Hamman Bura; Juggol, Juggol Primary School; Katibu I, Katibu Primary School; Katibu II, Katibu Primary School |
| Lau | Garin Dogo | Danjuma Garba, Kofar Danjuma Garba; Jauro Azoh, Jauro Azoh; Jauro Nyavo, Jauro Nyavo; Lainde, Lainde Primary School; Lushi, Lushi; Sarkin G/Dogo I, Kofar S/Dogo; Sarkin G/Dogo II, Garin Dogo Primary School; Sarkin Kauda, Kofar Sarkin Kauda; Sarkin Mindah I, Mindah Primary School; Sarkin Mindah II, Mindah Primary School |
| Lau | Garin Magaji | Ardido Yusa, Kofar Ardido Yusa; Garin Magaji, Garin Magaji Primary School; Jambutu, Jambutu Primary School; Kasuwan Jaki, L. G. Clinic; Mijinyawa, Mijinyawa; Yusa Fulani, Yusa Fulani Primary School |
| Lau | Jimlari | Ardido Market, Ardido Market; Appawa Lubbe, Lubbe Primary School; Appawa Market, Appawa Market; Appawa Primary School I, Appawa Primary School; Appawa Primary School II, Appawa Primary School; Bayu, Bayu; Fulani Nyakinti, Fulani Nyakinti; Jimlari Primary School, Jimlari Primary School; Sabukaru, Sabukaru Primary School; Suleiman, Suleiman; Wakili, Wakili |
| Lau | Kunini | Buba, Kofar Buba; Buba Gede, Devt. Area Office; Garin Sarki I, G/Sarki Primary School; Garin Sarki II, G/Sarki Primary School; Jauro Tukur Kofar Jauro Tukur; Kunini Primary School, Kunini Primary School; Maisaje, Kofar Maisaje; Runde, Runde |
| Lau | Lau I | Gwawi, Lau Motor Park; Kofar Sarki I, Lau Area Court; Kofar Sarki II, Lau Area Court; Kiri Galadima, Lau Central Primary School; Muhammadu, Lau Maternity Clinic; Musa Habu I, Kofar Musa Habu; Musa Habu II, Kofar Alh. Dan-Umma; Saidu, Kofar Mal. Zakari; Saidu Musa, Kofar Saidu Musa; Ung. Mashi, L. G. Clinic; Yaro Suguda, Lau Nursery School |
| Lau | Lau II | Buba Bachama, Kofar Buba Bachama; Doubeli, Doubeli Primary School; Garin Bakari, G/Bakari Primary School; Jungo, Kofar Tabah; Kabawa, Kabawa Primary School; Rigi Siyasa, Rigi Siyasa; Shomo Sarki I, Shomo Sarki Primary School; Shomo Sarki II, Shomo Sarki Primary School |
| Sardauna | Gembu 'A' | Bem, Bem Primary School; Jauro, Audu Baju Guest House; Kwalip, Nver Down Primary School; Lainga, Lainga Primary School; Mbu, Mbu Primary School; Ngeah, Ngeah Primary School; Nver, Nver Primary School; Nyongor, Nyongor Primary School; Pegi, In Front Of Gaskiya Chambers; Pegi II, In Front Of M/Ung's House; Tamnviya, Tamnviya Primary School; Tem, Tem Primary School; Yambam, Yambam Primary School; Yelwa, Inf. Of Alh. Bapetel's House |
| Sardauna | Gembu 'B' | Fadawa I, Chief's Palace, Gembu; Fadawa II, In Front Of Alh. Ali's House; Fed. Low Cost, Wuro Ardo Adamu Gembu; Hospital, Gen. Hospital, Gembu; Kaka Quarter I, G. S. S., Gembu; Kaka Quarter II, Kaka Quarter Primary School; Kambu Quarter, Independence Hall; Leme Bora, Bora Primary School; Leme Fuah, Fuah Primary School; Leme Telah, Telah Primary School; Mansur I, Mansur Primary School; Mansur II, Power House Gembu; Ndum Yaji, Phc Dispensary, Gembu; Ngikar, Ngikar Primary School; Panso Quarters, In Front Of Mai Ung's House; Teachers C. I., G. S. S., Gembu; Teachers C. II, L. G. Veterinary; Wah, Wah Primary School. |
| Sardauna | Kabri | Bang D. Kowa, Dadin Kowa Primary School; Barka, Barka Primary School; Chabbal Zance, Chabbal Zance Primary School; Chana, Chana Primary School; Dembe I, Dembe Primary School; Dembe II, Dembe Market; Dorofi Ia, Gdss Dorofi; Dorofi Ib, Gdss Dorofi; Dorofi Iia, Dorofi Market; Dorofi Iib, Dorofi Market; Hainare, Hainare Primary School; Jonjah, Jonjah Nomadic School; Kara, Kara Primary School; Kilatin, Kilatin Primary School; Kune, Kune Primary School; Laiko, Laiko Primary School; Luggungo, Lugguno Village; Mayo-Dule, Mayo Dule Primary School; Mayo-Fouru, Mayo Fouru Village; Ngur, Ngur Village; Ninge, Ninge 'A' Primary School; Song Barki, Song Barki Primary School; Tangana, Tangana Primary School |
| Sardauna | Kakara | Antere, Antere Primary School; Ardo Gori, Ardo Gori Primary School; Bangoba, Bangoba Primary School; Barup Biwa, Barup Biwa Village; Barup Jauro, Barup Primary School; Galadima, Galadima Primary School; Inkiri, Inkiri Primary School; Kachalla Sah, Kachalla Sah Primary School; Kakara, Kakara G. D. S. S.; Masoboyi, Masaboyi Primary School; Ndunda, Ndunda Primary School; Ngikar, Ngikar Primary School; Nyiwa, Nyiwa Primary School; Tappare Lawal, Tappare L. Village; Tappare Yahaya, Tappare Yahaya Village; Yerimaru I, Yerimaru Primary School; Yerimaru II, Yerimaru Primary School |
| Sardauna | Magu | Furmi I, Furmi Primary School; Furmi II, Tauro Ahmadu Atten's R.; Kusuku I, Kusuku Primary School; Kusuku II, Crin Office, Kusuku; Mayo-Nyebbe, Mayo-Nyebbe Primary School; Mayo-Sumsum, M/Sumsum Primary School; Naso, Naso Primary School; Nji, Nji Primary School; Zongon Ajiya I, Zongon Ajiya Market; Zongon Ajiya II, Zongon Ajiya Primary School |
| Sardauna | Mayo-Ndaga | Bariki, Dev. Area Office; Bundi, Bundi Primary School; Dundere, Dundere Primary School; Fada, Phc. Dispensary; Gashiri, Gashiri Primary School; Gikau, Gikau Primary School; Gono, Gono Village; Hurumgora, Hurum Gora Primary School; Jabu, Jabu Primary School; Kan-Iyaka I, Kan-Iyaka Primary School; Kan-Iyaka II, Kan-Iyaka Primary School; Kilayang, Kilayang Primary School; Kuma, Kuma Primary School; Liyam, Liyam Village; Luggatari, Sabon Layi Lugga; Madaki, Ung. Hausawa M/Ndaga; Mayo Wurbo, Mayo-Wurbo Primary School; Mayo Bali, Mayo-Bali Primary School; Njawai, Njawai Primary School; Njeke, Njeke Primary School; Papa, Papa Primary School; Shirip, Shirip Primary School; Tangabo, Tangabo Primary School; Tudun Wada, Special Primary School, M/Ndaga; Tem Petel, Tem Petel Primary School; Tikobi, Tikobi Primary School |
| Sardauna | Mbamnga | Ardo Adamu, Wuru Ardo Adamu Bang; Bang - Phc. Dispensary Bang; Gdss Mbamnga, Gdss Mbamnga; Lip, Lip Village; Mararraba, Gdss Bang; Mbara, Mbara Primary School; Mbamnga Petel - Mbamnga Petel Primary School; Mbar Kano, Mbar Nwah Primary School; Mbar Tule, Mbar Tule Primary School; Mbar Tim, Mbar Tim Primary School; Mbar Ntum - Mbar Ntum Village; Saam, Saam Village; Sanyere I, Phc Dispensary Mbamnga; Sanyere II, Phc Dispensary Mbamnga |
| Sardauna | Ndum-Yaji | Gam, Gam Village; Kim, Ndum-Yaji Primary School; Magam/Min, Ndum Yaji Primary School; Sahkaka, Sahkaka Primary School; Tep Babal, Tep Ning Gabal; Tep Kwar, Tep Primary School; Warkaka, Warkaka Primary School |
| Sardauna | Nguroje | Ardo Juli, T. A. D. P. Office, Nguroje; Ardo Marafa, Ardo Marafa Village; Belel, Belel Primary School; Bigoje, Bigoje Village; Dujire, Dujire Primary School; Gdss Ngu I, G. D. S. S., Nguroje; Gdss Ngu II, G. D. S. S., Nguroje; Gurgu, Gurgu Primary School; Hainare, Hainare Ardo Ali; Maisamari I, Maisamari Primary School; Maisamari II, Maisamari Primary School; Mayo Barkeje - Mayo-Barkeje Village; Pegi, Pegi Quarter, Nguroje; Sabon Gari - Sabon Gari Village; Ung. Bashiru - Dev. Area Office, Nguroje; Ung. Bashiru II - Dev. Area Office, Nguroje; Ung. Shehu, Nguroje Pilot Primary School; Yelwa, Yelwa Primary School |
| Sardauna | Titong | Chabbal Gudali - Chabbal G. Primary School; Jauro Saidu - Jauro Saidu Primary School; Kimbiyemin, Kimbiyemin Primary School; Lekkitaba, Lekkitabi Gdss; Mbaso, Mbaso Primary School; Njuge, Njuge Primary School; Ngubin, Ngubin Primary School; Titong I, Titong Primary School; Titong II, Titong Primary School; Tunga Maina - Tunga Maina Primary School; Yana, Yana Primary School; Yurum, Yurum Primary School |
| Sardauna | Warwar | Char, Warwar 'B' Primary School; Bambam, Vakude Primary School; Kindin, Warwar Primary School; Kwarakwara, Kwarakwara Primary School; Mang, Mang Primary School; Manip, Manip Village; Ndarup, Ndarup Primary School; Ndeng, Ndeng Village; Ndiyal, Ndiyal Village; Tamnya, Phc. Dispensary Tamnya I; Tamnya, Phc. Dispensary Tamnya II |
| Takum | Bete | Angwan Lufum, K/Sarkin Lufum; Betek/Sarki I, Kofar Sarki; Betek/Sarki II, Kofar Sarki Bete; Gamga, Gamga Primary School; Kofar. S/Bibi, Primary School, K/S. Bibi; Lukpo, Lukpo Primary School; Mpang/Mkpan, Mpang/Mkpan Open Space; Sabon Gida Bete, S/G. Bete Primary School; Takpa, Takpa; Worobo, Worobo |
| Takum | Chanchanji | Dakar, Dakar Open Space; Damever, Damever Open Space; Dogon Gawa, Dogon Gawa Primary School; Doshima Tyav, D/Tyav; Igbun Primary School, Igbun Primary School; Ingoov, Ingoov; Kofar Hanya, Kofar Hanya; Mbalam, Mbalam; Mbapine, Mbapine; Mbatato, Mbatato; Mbayoum, Mbayoum; Michar, Michar; New Gboko, New Gboko; K/Ahmadu, K/Ahmadu Pri. School; Tsarev, Tsarev; Tse-Audu, Tse-Audu; Tsepeeki, Tsepeeki; Tyolumun, Tyolumun; Yelwa I, Yelwa I; Yelwa II, Yelwa II |
| Takum | Dutse | Basang, Basang Open Space; Denyina, Denyina Open Space; Fadama, Fadama Open Space; Fawen, Fawen Open Space; Kofar Galadima, Kofar Galadima; K/S/Likam, K/S/Likam; Kofar Ukwe, Kofar Ukwe; Kofar K. Richuman, K/K/Richuman; Kofar M. Richuman, K/K/Richuman; Kofar Shinten; Mbarika, Mbarika; Mbarikam, Mbarikam; Mbiya - Mbiya Open Space; Muji I, Muji I; Muji II, Muji II; Tampa Primary School, Tampa Primary School; Tampa II, Tampa; Tanyi Primary School, Tanyi Primary School; Tudun Bankwe, Tudun Bankwe; Women Education Centre, Women Education Centre |
| Takum | Fete | Galumje, Galumje Primary School; Fete, Fete Primary School; Kapya I, Kapya I; Kapya II, Kapya II; Kufi, Kufi; Lufu I, Lufu Primary School; Lufu II, Lufu Primary School; Sufa, Sufa Primary School; Tampa, Tampa; Yeri, Yeri |
| Takum | Gahweton | Alheri Primary School, Alheri Primary School; Henry Porter, Henry Porter Primary School; K/Sarki J. Tsoho, K/S/J/Tsoho; K/Sarki J. Sabo I, K/S/J/Sabo I; K/Sarki J. Sabo II, K/S/J/Sabo II; Lufu, Rimi Primary School; Mbakpa Mbakpa |
| Takum | Bikashibila | Ang. Madaki, Ang. Madaki; Ang. Maharba, Ang. Maharba; Bakin Kasuwa, Bakin Kasuwa; Gama Vou, Gamavou; Jatau Akongo - Jatau Akongo Primary School; Kofar Birama, Kofar Birama; K/Sarkin Malumshe, K/S/Malumshe; Kofar Tunwari, Kofar Tunwari; Matazun, Mata Zun; Mgbe, Mgbe Primary School |
| Takum | Manya | Gangum, Gangum; Kofar Sarki I, Kofar Sarki I; Kofar Sarki II, Kofar Sarki II; Manya II, Manya; Shinkafa, Shinkafa; Tati Kumbo, T/Kumbo Primary School |
| Takum | Rogo | Abuja, Abuja; Dakatsalle, Dakatsalle; Dama, Dama; Hawan Shanu Barrack, Hawan Shanu Barrack; Iornumbe, Iornumbe; Karofi, Karofi; K/Babannana, K/Babannana; K/Sarkin Hausawa, K/Sarkin Hausawa; Kofar Maje, Kofar Maje; Kofar Liman, Kofar Liman; Wadata, Wadata |
| Takum | Shibong | Barki Lissan I, Barki Lissan I; Barki Lissan II, Barki Lissan II; Gatati, Gatati Primary School; Kofar Manga, Kofar Manga; Kofar S. Shibong, K/S/Shibong; Liji, Liji Primary School; Shibong Igbang, Shibong Igbang |
| Takum | Tikari | Bariya, Bariya; Jidu, Jidu; Kofar Wakili, Kofar Wakili; Kunatami, Kunatami; Pati, Pati; Tanji/Haske, Tanji/Haske; Takari I, Tikari I; Tikari II, Tikari II |
| Takum | Yukuben | Acha Nyim, Acha Nyim; Acha Sarka, Acha Sarka Primary School; Kofar Lutu, Kofar Lutu Primary School; Kofar Sarki, Kofar Sarki; Mamu Sabo, Mamu Sabo; Nyayirim I, Nyayirim Primary School; Nyayirim II, Nyayirim Primary School |
| Ussa | Bika | Kofar Andetur, Kofar Andetur; Kofar Kwe Bika Kwe Bika; Kwendak, Kwendak; Kofar Shiaki, Kofar Shiaki |
| Ussa | Fikyu | Fikyu Andeshwo, Andeshwo; Fikyu Bakin Kasuwa I, Kofar Kwe Yamusa; Fikyu Bakin Kasuwa Myirkwen II, Kofar D/Kwetaka; Fikyu Ndukwe, Fikyu Ndukwe; Fikyu Nyikun, Fikyu Nyikun |
| Ussa | Jenuwa | Baku, Baku; Nyicwu, Nyicwu; Nyifiye I, Nyifiye; Nyifiye II, Nyifiye; Rikwenyakwen, Rikwen-Yakwen; Rikwenmboi, Rikwenmboi; Ruwa, Ruwa; Tswankya, Tswankya; Ukok, Ukok |
| Ussa | Kpambo | Angwa Galumje, Angwan Galumje; Kpambo Primary School, Kpambo Primary School; Kpambo Riyang, Kpambo Riyang; Kpambo Roundabout, Kpambo Roundabout; Kpambo Ukwa I, Kpambo Ukwa; Kpambo Ukwa II, Kpambo Ukwa Primary School; Kpambo Yirom, Kpambo Yirom; Riyin-Kabrisi, Kabrisi |
| Ussa | Kpambo Puri | Kpambo Puri I, Kpambo Puri Primary School; Kpambo Puri II, Kpambo Puri Primary School; Kpambo Yashe, Kpambo Yashe; Kwentiki Primary School, Kwentiki Primary School; Lissam Sambo I, Lissam Sambo Primary School; Lissam Jatau, Lissam Jatau Primary School; Pantso, Pantso |
| Ussa | Kwambai | Jenuwa Kogi, J/Kogi Primary School; K/Igban Kisaba, K/Igban Kisaba; Kofar Kwe Kwambai, Kofar Kwe Kwambai; Kofar Mai-Unguwa Kwambai, Kofar Mai Unguwa Kwamba; Kofar Sarki, Kofar Sarki; Kofar Usman, Kofar Usman; Kwendo, Kwendo; Limpa, Limpa; Nzunyi, Nzunyi; Rubur/Kapya, Rubur/Kapya; Waeyi, Waeyi |
| Ussa | Kwesati | Andeussa I, Andeussa Primary School; Andeussa II(Sisean), Sisean; Ayiyi, Ayiyi; Kusansang, Kusansang Primary School; Kwesati I, Kwesati Primary School; Tutuwa, Tutuwa Primary School |
| Ussa | Lissam I | Kofar Kwezakariah, Kofar Kwe Zakariah; Kofar Kwe Zakariah II, Kijwu- Kofar Mai-Angwa; Kofar Kwe Ago, Kofar Kwe Ago; Kostine Primary School, Lissam Central Primary School; Kutupwen I, Kutupwen Primary School; Kutupwen II, Kutupwen Achifang; Yamusa, Yamusa Primary School |
| Ussa | Lissam II | K/Kwe Danjuma Sinde I, Kofar Kwe Danjuma Riki; K/ Kwe Danjuma Sinde II, Kofar Sinde Yifwe; Kunkufxang I, Kofar Kwe Adu; Kunkufxang II (K/Joro), Kofar Joro Irakuru; Sabon Gida Lissam, Kofar Joro Tuktur; Tamiya/Lupwe, Lupwe Primary School |
| Ussa | Lumbu | Kpakya, Kpakya Primary School; Kpakya, Kpakya Market; Lumbu Yaussa, Lumbu Yaussa Primary School; Rikwenrika, Rikwenrika Primary School; Weakwam, Weakwam |
| Ussa | Rufu | G. D. S. S. Rufu, G. D. S. S. Rufu; Kofar Musa Akama, Kofar Musa Akama; Rufu Bakin Kasuwa I, Bakin Kasuwa; Rufu B/K ( Kutufa), Primary School Kutufa; Rufu Primary School, Rufu Primary School; Yitsang, Yitsang Primary School |
| Wukari | Akwana | Aghanen, Aghanen; Akwana, Akwana Primary School; Andu Katswen, Andu Katswen Primary School; Arufu, Arufu Primary School; Beghayam, Beghayam Primary School; Fyayi, Fyayi Primary School; Gidan Ikwe, Gidan Ikwe; Ikwe, Ikwe Primary School; Kofar Masallachi, Kofar Masallachi Arufu; Kofar Sangari Arufu, Kofar Sangari Arufu; Kofar Sarkin Fyayi, Kofar Sarkin Fyayi; Kofar Kunyi, Kofar Kunyi; Kwatan Tsufa, Tswadige; Tswadige, Tsokwa Kassu; Tsokwa Kasu, Unguwan Liman; Tor Saai Asha, Kofar Tor Saai; Unguwar Liman, Unguwar Liman |
| Wukari | Avyi | Audu Kombe, Audu Kombe; Idofi, Idofi Village; Kofar Adi Uke, Kofar Adi Uke; Kofar Bura, Kofar Bura; Kofar Gadu, Kofar Gadu; Kofar Tsojon Ikwe, Kofar Tsojon Ikwe; Kofar Liman Sule, Kofar Liman Sule; Low Cost, Low Cost; Maianguw Useni Likita, K/Mai Ungwa Useni Likita; Mal. Bello N/Primary School, M. Bello Nur. Primary School; Prison Service, Prison Service; Pwadzu, Pwadzu Primary School; St. Mary's Primary School, St. Mary's Primary School |
| Wukari | Bantaje | Atoro, Atoro Village; Atsaga, Atsaga; Bantaje Primary School I, Bantaje Primary School I; Bantaje Primary School II, Bantaje Primary School II; Chediya, Chediya Primary School; Chiye/Doko, Chiye/Doko; Denis Kuku, Gindin Tsamiya; Galadima Nyankwala, K/Galadima; Gborbegha, Gborbergha; Gondo, Kofar Gondo; Gindin Dorowa I, Gindin Dorowa Primary School; Gindin Dorowa II, Gindin Dorowa Primary School; Kambari, Kambari Primary School; Kofar Sarkin Bantaje, Kofar Sarkin Bantaje; Kofar Zando, Kofar Zando; Kofar Sarkin Noma, Kofar Sarkin Noma; Kofar Toma, Kofar Toma Tunari; Kanon Kabawa, Kwatan Doya; Kofar Jahu Mahanga, Jahun Mahanga; Kofar Kachalla, Kofar Kachalla; Local Govt. Dispensary, Local Govt. Dispensary; Mahanga, Mahanga; Male, Male; Nakambo, Nakambo; Natirde, Natirde; Nyankwala, Nyankwala Primary School; Nwonko, Nwonko Primary School; Nyanhina, Nyanhina; Sakyo, Sakyo Primary School; Tunari, Tunari Primary School; Ung. Mumuni, Chediya Mumuni |
| Wukari | Chonku | Aka Akah, Jandekyula; Bye Gya, Bye Gya; Chudan, Chudan Primary School; Chonku, Chonku Primary School; Dapye, Dapye; Gborcha, Gborcha; Igba, Ando Igba; Jabwaje, Jabwaje; Kyalor, Kyalor; Kumutu, Kumutu Primary School; Numa, Numa Primary School; Nwutsa, Nwutsa Primary School; Nwukan, Nwukan; Nwoban, Nwoban Primary School; Riti, Riti Primary School; Tor Ioryina, Tor Ioryina; Usman Abe, Usman Abe |
| Wukari | Hospital | B. B. Bread, B. B. Bread; Ebenezer Primary School, Ebenezer Primary School; Haliru Dogara, Haliru Dogara; Kofar Ato Umaru, Kofar Ato Umaru; K/Mamman Kator I, Kofar M. Kator; K/Mamman Kator II, K/Bala Bello; Kofar Yamusa, Kofar Yamusa; K/Sale Vyonku, K/Sale Vyonku; K/M. Ung. Kantanawa, K/M. Kantanawa; K/Abdul W. S. Pawa, Kofar A. W. Sarkin Pawa; K/Garban Loko, K/Garban Loko; K/Danladi M. Yusuf, K/D. M. Yusuf; K/Nwungye, K/Nwungye; M. G. G. S. S., M. G. G. S. S.; Nurul Islam, N. I. Primary School; Umaru Kankani, Umaru Kankani; State Poly, State Polytechnic |
| Wukari | Jibu | Alamini, Alamini Primary School; Baka Gari/Takarda, Baka Gari; Benkaho, Ben Kaho; Bye-Pyi, Bye-Pyi Primary School; Bye-Yora, Bye-Yora; Galadima Kabawa, Galadima Kabawa; Igbogodo, Igbogodo; Jibu, Jibu Primary School; Kofar Sarkin Noma, Kofar Sarkin Noma Bye Kahki; Local Govt. Dispensary, Local Govt. Dispensary; Mararraban Nwokyon, Mararraban Nwokyon; Nayi Nawa, Nayi Nawa Primary School; Nwokyon, Nwokyon; Nwohwa, Nwohwa; Tapare, Tapare Primary School; Tudun Wada, Tudun Wada; Tse Yongur, Tse Yongur; Va'Ayem, Va'Ayem; Zariya, Zariya; Zondoku, Zondoku |
| Wukari | Kente | Agaku, Gaku; Awudu Ingyu, Awudu Ingyu; Chinkai Primary School, Chinkai Primary School; Emmanuel Akere, Akere; G. D. S. S. Kente, G. D. S. S. Kente; Gidan Yaku, Gidan Yaku; Kente Primary School I, Kente Primary School; Kente Primary School II, Kente Primary School; Kofar Ishaku I & II, Kofar Ishaku; Kofar Sam. Abe, Kofar Abe; Kofar Kundu, Kofar Kundu Chinkai; K/Ishaku/Utuku, Kofar Ishaku/Utuku Sondi; K/Sarkin Kasuwa, K/Sarkin Kasuwa; Ndur, Nduul Ugema; Se'An, Se'An; Sharagh, Sharagh; Sondi Primary School I, Sondi Primary School; Sondi Primary School II, Sondi Primary School; Warawa, Warawa; Ung. Kabawa, Unguwar Kabawa; Ung. S/Chinkai, Kofar Sarki |
| Wukari | Puje | Cent. Primary School, Central Primary School; Gidan Moto, Zum Farm Centre; George Ten/Hyuku, George Ten/Hyuku; Hakim Shishi I, K/Hakami Shishi; Hakimi Shishi II, K/Ataki Orume; Hyuku, Hyuku Primary School; K/Usman Fanya, K/Usman Fanya; K/Ajidiku, K/Ajidiku; K/ Shatima, K/U Shatima; K/Inuwa Baba, K/Inuwa Baba; K/Moyi, K/Moyi; Mar. Islamiya Primary School I, Marmara; Mar. Islam Primary School II, K/ Tahiru Manman; Mechanic Village, Mechanic Village; Aku Uka's Palace, Aku Uka's Palace; Wukari East Primary School, Wukari East Primar School; Yam Market, Yam Market |
| Wukari | Rafin Kada | Abako/Mbashagba, Mbashagba; Adi Angy K. Vyon, Adi Angy; Akawu Yalgam, Akawu Yalgam; Alhaji B. B. Almutu, A. B. Gaya; Gavyosa, Gavyon; John Nforgwe, John Nforgwe; Kofar Awudu Agbu, Kofar Awudu Agbu; Kofar Sarkin R/Kaba, K/Sarkin R/Kada; Kofar Baba R/Kada, Kofar Baba R/Kada; Kofar Vyon R/Kada, Kofar Vyon R/Kada; Kudu Gaya, Kudu Gaya; Mbashagba U., Mbashagba Ukande Primary School; R/Kada Primary School, R/Kada Primary School; Tor Iwambe, Tor Iwambe; Tor Iorshaga, Tor Iorshaga; Tsokwa Agyok, T. A. Kubande; Yawe Gbereve, Yawe Gbereve; Yusuf Yellow/Ason Primary School, Ason Primary School |
| Wukari | Tsokundi | Ajuji, Ajuji; Ayota, Ayota; Avi Primary School, Avi Primary School; Baba Tela, Baba Tela; Da'A, Da'A Primary School; Gani Kodi, Gani Kodi; Gidan Idi, Gidan Idi Primary School; G/Hakimi G/Idi, K/H/Gidan Idi; Gidan Muh'D Mkifi, Gidan Muh'D Mkifi; Ikyer Num, Ikyernum Primary School; K/Ajidiku, Ajidiku Turu; K/Mbakur-Pur, K/Mbakur-Pur; K/Saani, K/Saani; K/Bawa, K/Bawa; K/Ishaku, K/Ishaku; Tsokundi, Tsokundi; Zegete, Zegete |
| Yorro | Bikassa I | Dinya, A Mini Market Place; Gampu, Local Government Dispensary; Kassa, Kassa Primary School; Koking, Yerima Taka's Palace; Kunzang, Kunzang Primary School; Panti Kayya, Kayya Primary School |
| Yorro | Bikassa II | Bariki Dankum, A Mini Market Place; Bonshala, Kofan Wakili; Dankum I, Dankum Primary School; Dankum II, Panti's Palace Dankum; Dokin, Dokin Primary School; Gangoro, Doma Adamu's Palace; Kukopo, A Mini Market Place; Sarkin Fada, Sarkin Fada's Palace; Yerima Javo, Yerima Javo's Palace |
| Yorro | Nyaja I | Gombejo, Gombejo's Palace; Lanko, Lanko Primary School; Nyaja Lapu, Nyaladi Gorko Primary School; Panti Buri, Panti Buri Primary School; Panti Nyaja, A Mini Market Place; Unkwa, Unkwa Primary School |
| Yorro | Nyaja II | Panti Bubutu, Panti Bubutu's Palace; Panti Kajong I, Panti Kajong's Palace; Panti Kajong II, Panti Yessing Primary School; Panti Ntari, Shonpa Primary School |
| Yorro | Pantisawa I | Dila I, Dila Primary School; Dila II, Wakili Gwamba; Di-Kunzang, Di-Kun Zang; Gdss P/Sawa, Gdss Panti Sawa; Nyaladi, Nyaladi Primary School; Panti Ali, Panti Ali's Palace; Panti Lacheke, Gadda Primary School; Pantisawa I, Pantisawa Primary School; Pantisawa II, Ung. Fada P/Sawa; Panti Soreng, Soreng Primary School |
| Yorro | Pantisawa II | Jauro Vorobi, Ung. Mission Diza; Lapu I, Lapu Primary School; Lapu II, Yali Senso; Panti Dasso, Wakili Yappo Palace; Wakili Pugon, Wakili Pugon Primary School |
| Yorro | Pupule I | Danzang, Danzang Primary School; Manzalang, Ung. Mission Manzalang; Old Kwajji I, Old Kwajji Primary School; Old Kwajji II, Kasuwan Taya Kwajji; Pabenzang, A Mini Market Place; Pupule, Pupule Primary School; Ung. Fada, Bakoji's Palace Pupule |
| Yorro | Pupule II | Boli Mika, Boli Mika Primary School; Dampang, Jauro's Palace; Layang Werebang, Layang Primary School; Mika Mararaba I, A Mini Market; Mika Mararaba II, Dan Yala; Narapo Boro, Mika Primary School; Shomman, Local Government Dispensary, Shomman |
| Yorro | Pupule III | Boli Sabo, Boli Sabo Primary School; Dandikulu, Dandikulu Primary School; Dogan Alkali, Jauro's Palace; Gopa Sanyori, Dogopi Primary School; Jika I, Jika Primary School; Jika II, Yuzoko; Mabang, Mabang Primary School; Manang, Manang Primary School; Nadaviba, A Mini Market |
| Yorro | Sumbu I | Jauro A Fulani, Jauro A. Fulani's Place; Jauro Faruku, Jauro Faruku's Place; Lankaviri Dispensary, Local Government Dispensary, Lankaviri; Lankaviri Gdss I, Lankaviri Gdss; Lankaviri Gdss II, Lankaviri Gdss; Lankaviri Primary I, Lankaviri Primary School; Lankaviri Primary II, Ung. Hausawa Lankaviri; Panti Basheng, Panti Basheng's Place; Pantinapu, Panti Napu Primary School |
| Yorro | Sumbu II | Garin Mal. Audu, Garin Mal. Audu Primary School; Gongon Maliki, Panti's Palace; Panti Kir, Panti Kir Primary School; Tedang, Wakili Masho's Place; Zampa, Zampa Primary School; Zavo Ranti, Mini Market |
| Zing | Bitako | Bitako Ibrahim Primary School, Bitako Ibrahim Primary School; Bitako Yali Primary School I, Bitako Yali Primary School I; Bitako Yali Primary School II, Bitako Yali Primary School II; Dansa, Dansa; Jabansi Primary School, Jabansi Primary School; Mazara Primary School I, Mazara Primary School I; Mazara Primary School II, Mazara Primary School II; Sabon Layi Jen, Sabon Layi Jen; Sule Naya, Sule Naya |
| Zing | Bubong | Bomeh, Bomeh; Buzza Primary School, Buzza Primary School; Lappo, Kwanti Lappo; Lasari, Lasari; Mampali Primary School, Mampali Primary School; Nazipo, Nazipo; Nbosung Primary School, Nbosung Primary School; Yonko Primary School, Yonko Primary School; Zippo Primary School, Zippo Primary School |
| Zing | Dinding | Dangong Primary School, Dangong Primary School; Deba Yali, Deba Yali; Dinding Primary School, Dinding Primary School; Kossa Primary School, Kossa Primary School; Kugong Primary School, Kugong Primary School; Mang, Mang; Tologwe, Kwanti Tologwe; Yukwa Primary School, Yukwa Primary School |
| Zing | Lamma | Bansi Primary School, Bansi Primary School; Bunu Bariki, Bunu Bariki; Bunu Masapo, Bunu Masapo; Dandi Dispensary, Dandi Dispensary; Dandi Primary School, Dandi Primary School; Dong, Kwanti Dong; Gwole, Gwole; Koyu Primary School, Koyu Primary School; Kwanti Danze, Kwanti Danze; Lamma Primary School I, Lamma Primary School I; Lamma Primary School II, Lamma Primary School II; Musa Tika, Musa Tika; Natsirde Primary School, Natsirde Primary School |
| Zing | Monkin A | G. D. S. S. Monkin, G. D. S. S. Monkin; Lambong Primary School, Lambong Primary School; Monkin Primary School, Monkin Primary School; New Dev. Area Office, New Dev. Area Office; Nyelle Primary School, Nyelle Primary School; Old Dev. Area Office, Old Dev. Area Office; Tavingwa Primary School, Tavingwa Primary School; Viewing Centre, Viewing Centre |
| Zing | Monkin B | Daffe Dutse, Daffe Dutse; Idirisu Daffe, Idirisu Daffe; Jan Kwani Primary School, Jan Kwani Primary School; Kosensi, Kosensi Primary School; Mapoko, Mapoko; Ndakwanti, Ndakwanti; Nana Ahli, Nana Ahli; Sagwe, Sagwe Primary School; Taviri, Taviri Primary School; Umaru, Umaru Dogwe; Volashanki, Volashanki; Yohana, Yohana Dogwe; Zum, Zum Primary School |
| Zing | Yakoko | Bendi, Bendi; Benbong, Benbong; Bisomporong, Bisomporong Primary School; Boduga, Boduga Primary School; Dang Be, Dang Be Primary School; Della, Della Adamu; Kozang, Kozang Primary School; Kwenzang, Kwenzang Primary School; Lakwanti, Lakwanti Primary School; Nyavo, Nyavo Sale; Nyeli, Nyeli Primary School; Samari Zang, Samari Zang; Taburazeh, Taburazeh Primary School; Togopi, Togopi; Tolo Yabi, Tolo Yabi; Wakili Tonka, Wakili Tonka; Yakoko I, Yakoko Primary School I; Yakoko II, Yakoko Primary School II |
| Zing | Zing Ai | District Office I, District Office I; District Office II, District Office II; Ibrahim Sambo I, Ibrahim Sambo I; Ibrahim Sambo II, Ibrahim Sambo II; Tadovah I, Tadovah Primary School I; Tadovah II, Tadovah Primary School II; Tadovah III, Tadovah Primary School III; Tadovah IV, Tadovah Primary School IV; Tuna Po, Tuna Po Primary School; Tudun Wada, Tudun Wada Open Space |
| Zing | Zing Aii | Kagong, Kagong Primary School; Kakulu I, Kakulu Primary School, I; Kakulu II, Kakulu Primary School, II; Kakulu III, Kakulu Primary School III; Old V. T. C., Old V. T. C. |
| Zing | Zing B | Gam Po Bong, Gampobong Primary School; Jagambo, Jagambo Primary School; Kwana Dispensary, Kwana Dispensary; Shonvi Shapeng, Shonvi Shapeng; Tagalang, Tagalang Primary School; Tsohon Gari, Tsohon Gari Primary School; Zandi Gida, Zandi Gida |
