= Turaki =

Turaki may refer to:

- Turaki A Ward, ward in Nigeria
- Turaki B Ward, ward in Nigeria
- Ibrahim Saminu Turaki (born 1963), Nigerian actuary
