= Barade Ward =

Ward in Jalingo, Nigeria

Barade is a ward in Jalingo Local government area of Taraba State, Nigeria.
