= Aisha Shehu Adamu =

Nigerian medical consultant

Dr. Aisha Shehu Adamu
- Born: 1969 (age 56–57); Potiskum, Yobe State
- Citizenship: Nigeria
- Education: University of Maiduguri; University of Liverpool, UK
- Occupations: Chief Medical Director, Federal Medical Centre Jalingo
- Website: draishasa.com

Aisha Shehu Adamu (born September 1969) is a Nigerian medical consultant. She is the current Chief Medical Director of Federal Medical Centre, Jalingo. She assumed office in March 2020 and was reappointed in 2024 by President Bola Tinubu for a second term.

== Early life and career ==
Aisha Adamu hails from Karim-Lamido Local Government Area of Taraba State. She was born in Potiskum, Yobe State. She completed her secondary education at Federal Government Girls' College Yola before proceeding to the University of Maiduguri where she obtained a Bachelor of Medicine and Surgery (MB BS) degree, specializing in gastroenterology. At the University of Maiduguri Teaching Hospital, she completed her residency program, and in 2008, she was appointed as a consultant physician at Federal Medical Center Jalingo. She also holds a certificate in international health consultancy from the Liverpool School of Tropical Medicine, United Kingdom.
