= Federal Medical Centre, Jalingo =

Federal Medical Centre in Nigeria

Geography
- Location: Jalingo, Taraba State, Nigeria

Organisation
- Care system: Public
- Type: Teaching, Research

Services
- Emergency department: Yes

History
- Founded: November 1999

Links
- Website: www.fmcjalingo.gov.ng
- Lists: Hospitals in Nigeria

Jalingo Senate Building

Federal Medical Centre, Jalingo also known as FMC Jalingo, is a federal government of Nigeria's hospital located in Jalingo, Taraba State, Nigeria. It was established in November, 1999 with Dr. Daniel as its first Medical Director. The current chief medical director is Aisha Shehu Adamu.

== History ==
Federal Medical Centre, Jalingo was established in November, 1999. The hospital was formerly known as General Hospital, Jalingo.

== Mission ==
The mission of the hospital as appears in its official website is: "To provide effective, efficient and affordable healthcare services to the citizenry in line with the Federal Government’s objectives for the healthcare delivery system."

== Vision ==
The vision of the hospital as stated in its website is: "To transform the Federal Medical Centre Jalingo into a centre noted for high quality medical care and a centre of excellence in the control of infectious diseases through surveillance, monitoring and clinical intervention."

== CMD ==
The current chief medical director is Aisha Shehu Adamu.

In 2024 president Bola Tinubu reappointed Dr Adamu as the chief Medical Director (CMD) of the hospital.

== Management staff ==
The top management staff of the hospital as outlined in the hospital's website are:

- Barr. Okey-Ezea - Board Chairman
- Dr. Aisha Sehu Adamu - Chief Medical Director
- Adamu Ardo - Director of Administration
- Dr. Suleiman A. Kirim - Head of Clinical Services
- Isaac Onifade Ayedole - Chief Accountant
- Abdurrazaq Isa Imam - Head of Internal Audit
- Dr. Elashi Graham - Deputy HCS Clinical
- Dr. Kuni Israkeb Joseph - Deputy CMAC Admin
- Hajara A. Mazang - Head of Nursing Services
- Hadi Habu - Head of Works Maintenance

== Departments and services ==
The departments and services carryout by this hospital as enshrined in their website include:

- Administration Department
- Anesthesia Department
- Dentistry Department
- Family Medicine Department
- Finance and Accounts Department
- Internal Audit Department
- Internal Medicine Department
- Medical Records Department
- Medical Social Services Department
- Medical Laboratory Services Department
- Nursing Services Department
- Nutrition and Dietetics Department
- Obstetrics and Gynecology Department
- Ophthalmology Department
- Pediatrics Department
- Pathology Department
- Pharmacy Department
- Physiotherapy Department
- Radiology Department
- Surgery Department
- Works and Maintenance Department
- Public Health Department

== Project commission ==
On the 3rd of October 2024 there was a commission of ultramodern facilities of a morgue in the hospital to aid and improved the operation in the hospital.

The federal ministry of water resources and sanitation donates borehole and solar pannel to the hospital this is to ensure sustainable water supply to the hospital.

=== Renovation ===
September 2024, there is Renovations of the Polymerase Chain Reaction (PCR) Laboratory at federal medical center jalingo for HIV /AlDs and Tuberculosis which is for monitoring/testing and treatment of this diseases in Taraba state.which is in a bad condition for a long time.
