= Majidadi Ward =

Ward in Jalingo, Nigeria

Majidadi is a ward in Jalingo, the capital city of Taraba State, Nigeria.
