= Sarkin Dawaki Ward =

Ward in Jalingo, Nigeria

Sarkin Dawaki is a ward in Nigeria, existing in Jalingo Local Government Area of Taraba state.
