= Kachalla Sembe Ward =

Ward in Jalingo, Nigeria

Coordinates: 8.8701°N 11.3906°E

Kachalla Sembe is a ward in Taraba state of Nigeria, existing in Jalingo Local Government Area.
