= Turaki B Ward =

Ward in Jalingo, Nigeria

Turaki B is a ward in Jalingo Local Government Area of Taraba State, Nigeria.
