= Sarkin Dawa =

Village in Nigeria

- Village
- Location within Nigeria
- Coordinates: 8°18′N 11°3′E
- Country: Nigeria
- State: Taraba State
- LGA: Bali
- Time zone: UTC+1 (WAT)
- Climate: Aw

Sarkin Dawa is a village located in the Kam District Area in Bali Local Government Area, Taraba State, central eastern Nigeria. There is no reliable data available to estimate the total population of the village. The place falls in the territory of the Kam (Nyingwom) ethnic group but also hosts residents from various other ethnic groups. The name Sarkin Dawa (Hausa for 'king of guinea corn') refers to the village head, who is also the political king of the Kam people.
