= Sintali Ward =

Ward in Jalingo, Nigeria

Sintali is a ward in Jalingo Local Government Area, the capital city of Taraba state, Nigeria.
