= Mayo Goi Ward =

Ward in Jalingo, Nigeria

Mayo Goi is a ward in Jalingo Local Government Area of Taraba state, Nigeria.
