= Jalingo =

Capital city of Taraba State, Nigeria

- LGA and city
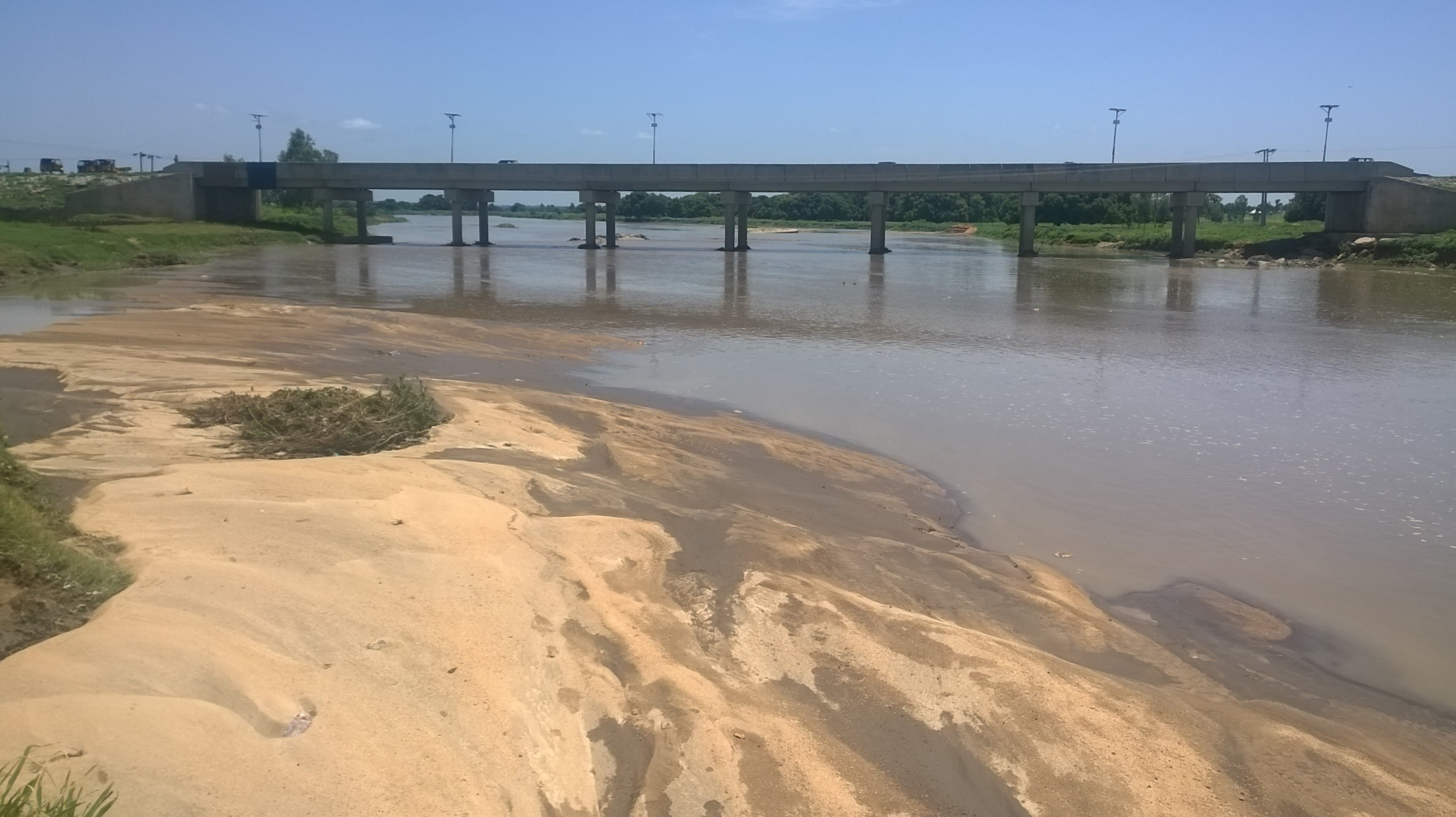
- Jalingo
- Interactive map of Jalingo
- Location within Nigeria
- Coordinates: 8°54′N 11°22′E
- Country: Nigeria
- State: Taraba State

Government
  - Local Government Chairman and the Head of the Local Government Council: Alh. Aminu Hassan Jauro

Population (2022)
  - Total: 581,000
- Time zone: UTC+01:00 (WAT)
- Climate: Aw

Jalingo is the capital city of Taraba State in north-eastern Nigeria, named in Fulfude (the word Jalingo means "Superior Place") and has been estimated with population of 418,000 as of 2018, The city has received the highest number of immigrants mainly from, Kano, Borno, Gombe and the neighbouring Cameroon. As of November, 2022 the city is estimated to have around 581,000 people. There are 10 Wards in Jalingo local government area namely: Abbare Yelwa, Barade, Kachalla Sembe, Kona, Majidadi, Mayo Goi, Sarkin Dawaki, Sintali, Turaki ‘A’, Turaki ‘B’

== Ethnic groups ==
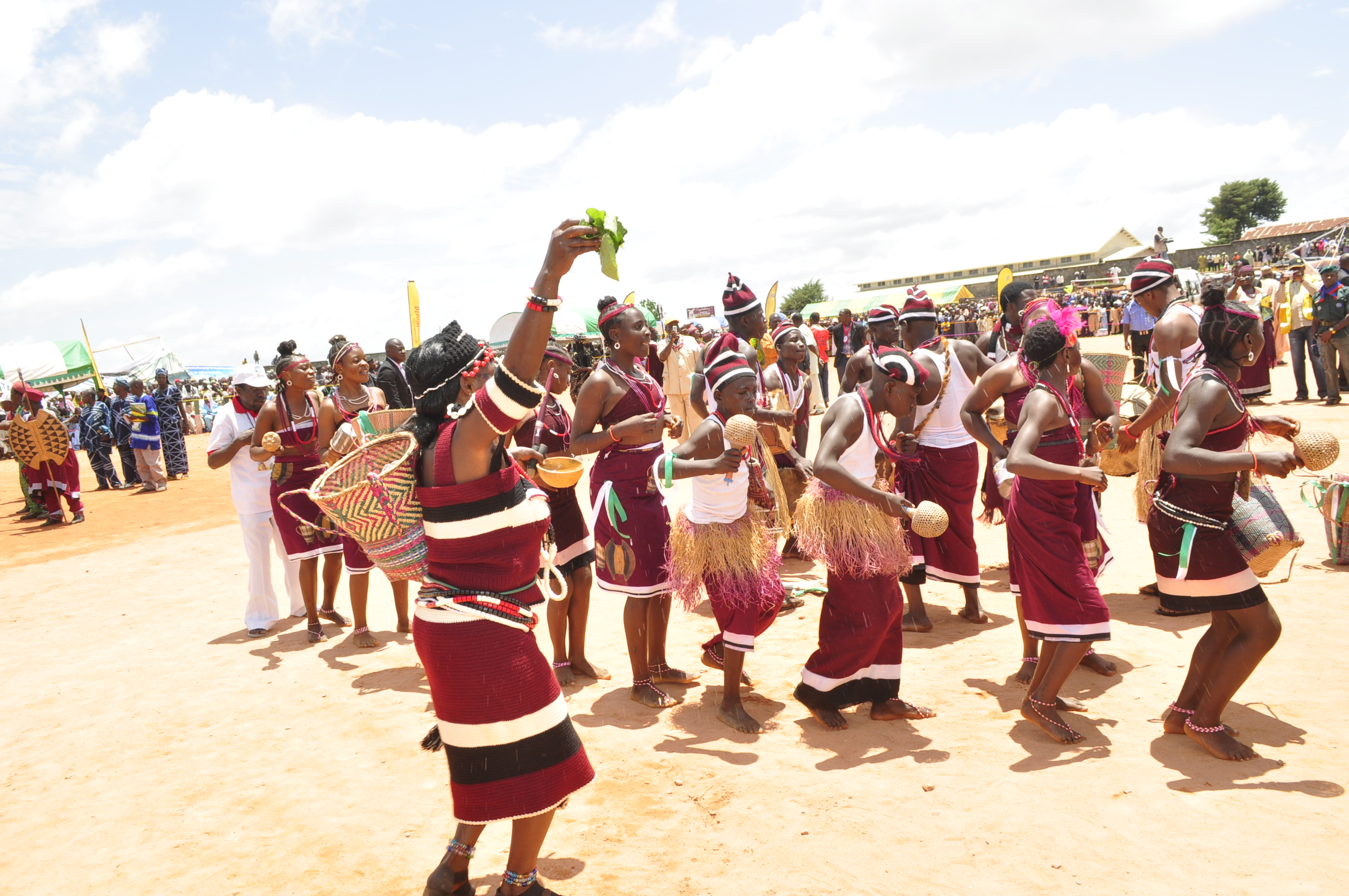
Traditioanal Dancer From Taraba State

The city is dominated (60%) and ruled by Fulani who settled during Fulani Jihad of Usman Dan Fodio. Mumuye, Kuteb and Kona are large minority 25%, 15% and 10% respectively. Wurkum, Hausa, Jukun and Jenjo, are found in significant numbers.

Fulfulde, Mumuye, Hausa, and many other local languages are spoken in Jalingo. Jalingo is the seat of the Muri Emirate and a town founded during the Muslim Jihad era.

== Caretaker chairman ==
Each local government in Nigeria is governed by caretaker chairmen. They are the one that run the affairs of the state.

The elected Chairman of Jalingo during the last election in 2020 was Hon. Abdulnaseer Bobboji of People Democratic Party (PDP). He had been the Caretaker Chairman until when his tenure ended on Sunday, 3 July 2022. Following that, the Taraba State Governor, Arch. Darius Dickson Ishaku appointed the former Taraba Primary Health Care Development Agency Executive Secretary, Alh. Aminu Jauro as the caretaker Chairman of Jalingo.

== Markets ==
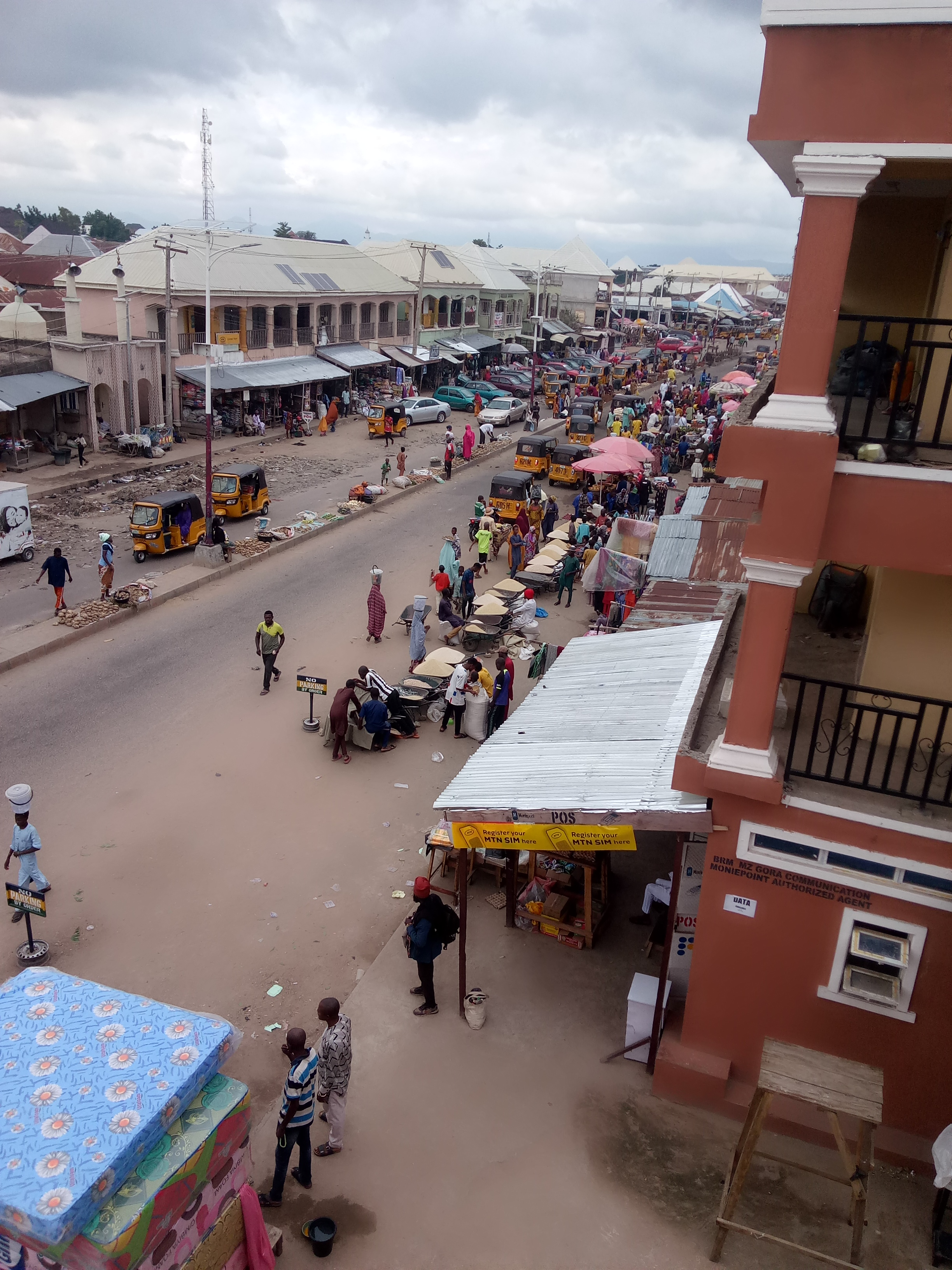
Jalingo Main market Taraba State

Jalingo as the capital city of Taraba State has many markets, but the major recognised markets are:

- Jalingo Main Market
- Kasuwan Yelwa (Yelwa Market)
- Jalingo Grain Market
- Mile Six Market

== Climate ==
Like most of Nigeria, Jalingo has a tropical savanna climate (Köppen Aw). The wet season is oppressive and cloudy, the dry season is partly cloudy, and it is hot year round. Temperatures typically range from 16.1 to 37.2 °C (61 to 99 °F), with usual extreme lows and highs of 13.3 °C (56 °F) and 40.6 °C (105 °F) respectively. With a usual increase in rainfall on the crest and to the windward and a rain shadow on the leeward side, Jalingo's climate exhibits a straightforward pattern of east-west climatic zones that has been modified by the influence of some highlands.

Climate data for Jalingo (1991–2020)
Month	Jan	Feb	Mar	Apr	May	Jun	Jul	Aug	Sep	Oct	Nov	Dec	Year
Record high °C (°F)	40 (104)	42 (108)	42.5 (108.5)	42.3 (108.1)	40.5 (104.9)	38 (100)	35.2 (95.4)	39.6 (103.3)	34.2 (93.6)	38.4 (101.1)	39 (102)	38.5 (101.3)	42.5 (108.5)
Mean daily maximum °C (°F)	34.8 (94.6)	37.2 (99.0)	38.5 (101.3)	36.7 (98.1)	34.0 (93.2)	31.7 (89.1)	30.6 (87.1)	30.3 (86.5)	30.7 (87.3)	31.9 (89.4)	34.2 (93.6)	34.8 (94.6)	33.8 (92.8)
Mean daily minimum °C (°F)	19.1 (66.4)	22.4 (72.3)	25.3 (77.5)	25.5 (77.9)	24.0 (75.2)	22.9 (73.2)	22.8 (73.0)	22.7 (72.9)	22.4 (72.3)	22.5 (72.5)	20.5 (68.9)	18.2 (64.8)	22.4 (72.3)
Record low °C (°F)	13 (55)	13.7 (56.7)	16.7 (62.1)	17.3 (63.1)	15 (59)	15.5 (59.9)	15.5 (59.9)	16 (61)	14 (57)	14.2 (57.6)	13.1 (55.6)	12.5 (54.5)	12.5 (54.5)
Average rainfall mm (inches)	1.0 (0.04)	1.1 (0.04)	13.5 (0.53)	69.7 (2.74)	147.4 (5.80)	169.1 (6.66)	199.3 (7.85)	210.7 (8.30)	241.8 (9.52)	115.5 (4.55)	7.6 (0.30)	1.9 (0.07)	1,178.6 (46.40)
Average rainy days (≥ 1.0 mm)	0.1	0.1	1.1	4.8	7.8	9.7	10.2	11.3	13.2	7.4	0.8	0.1	66.5
Average relative humidity (%)	31.8	29.7	40.0	61.1	75.3	81.2	85.0	87.2	85.7	80.3	57.6	40.5	62.9
Source: NOAA

With an average daily high temperature of 35.6 °C or 96 °F, the hot season lasts for 2.3 months, from February 4 to April 15. With an average high of 37.2 °C or 99 °F and low of 23.3 °C or 74 °F, March is the hottest month of the year in Jalingo.

With an average daily high temperature below 30 °C or 86 °F, the cool season lasts for 3.4 months, from June 25 to October 6. In Jalingo, December is the coolest month of the year, with an average low of 17.2 °C or 63 °F and high of 32.8 °C or 91 °F.

=== Cloud cover ===
The average proportion of sky covered by clouds in Jalingo varies significantly seasonally throughout the year.

Around October 30 marks the start of Jalingo's clearer season, which lasts just over 4 months and ends around March 6.

In Jalingo, January is the clearest month of the year, with the sky remaining clear, mostly clear, or partly cloudy 51% of the time on average.

Beginning about March 6 and lasting for 7.8 months, the cloudier season of the year ends around October 30.

May is the cloudiest month of the year in Jalingo, with the sky being overcast or mostly cloudy 82% of the time on average.

=== Effect of climate change in Jalingo ===
Africa, particularly Nigeria, is highly vulnerable to the effects of climate change due to its geographical characteristics, including its arid northern border and coastal southern region. The region's heavy reliance on rain-fed agriculture, coupled with prevalent poverty and limited response capabilities, magnify its susceptibility. This situation, combined with insufficient adaptation measures and financial constraints among individuals, results in significant threats to both the social and economic well-being of Africa's population. Adverse consequences stemming from climate change, such as heightened temperatures, diminished water resources, loss of biodiversity, and increased disease transmission, significantly impact livelihoods. The lack of awareness, especially among less educated communities, contributes to behaviours that exacerbate the issue. Mobilising the sizeable student population in Nigerian tertiary institutions for climate change awareness can serve as a pivotal solution, bolstering adaptive capacity and sustainable livelihood strategies for the region.

=== Air pollution ===
Jalingo has a serious health risk from airborne particles, especially dust, which can infiltrate into the deepest portions of the lung and result in asthma episodes, bronchitis, and other lung conditions.

== See also ==
- Federal Medical Centre, Jalingo
- Taraba State University
