= Kona Ward =

Ward in Jalingo, Nigeria

Kona is a ward in Jalingo Local Government Area of Taraba State, Nigeria.
