= Dorofi =

- Town
- Location within Nigeria
- Coordinates: 6°34′00″N 11°25′00″E
- Country: Nigeria
- State: Taraba State
- LGA: Sardauna
- Elevation: 1,661 m (5,449 ft)
- Time zone: UTC+1 (WAT)

Dorofi is a small town on the Mambilla Plateau in Taraba State in Central Eastern part of Nigeria. It is 40 km from Gembu, the Sardauna Local Government Area headquarters. It is located on Nigeria's border with Cameroon Republic. It has a temperate climate, with a mean air temperature of 17.5 °C (63.5 °F). It is among the coldest towns in Nigeria. Dorofi's landscape consists of hills and valleys. The people of Dorofi engage in small-scale farming down the hills and cattle grazing up the hills. Views from different sites of Dorofi show plantations of eucalyptus, used for building materials as well as a source of energy for domestic work and warming in cold winters.

With proximate distance to Cameroon republic, businesses prosper in both buying/selling as well as currency exchange. The population of Dorofi is about 5,000, with about 10% graduates who work in different institutions across the country. Young people from surrounding villages further their education in Dorofi.

Activities in Dorofi include traditional dances of the Fulani, Mambila and Kaka which are celebrated during Muslim and Christian festive seasons. The Muslim festivals are characterised by horse riding competition called Kilisa in Fulani language.
