= Abbare Yelwa Ward =

Ward in Jalingo, Nigeria

Coordinates: 9°0′31.741″N 11°14′22.481″E

Abbare Yelwa is a ward in Jalingo Local Government Area, the state capital of Taraba, Nigeria.
