= Turaki A Ward =

Ward in Jalingo, Nigeria

Turaki A is a ward among the wards in Taraba state capital, Jalingo Local Government Area, Nigeria.
