= 2022 Bugaya by-election =

By-election for the Bugaya state assembly seat

- 19 November 2022

N66 Bugaya seat in the Sabah State Legislative Assembly
	First party	Second party	Third party
Candidate	Jamil Hamzah	Abdul Aziz Mohd Ibno	Zulfadzli Shi Ahmad
Party	WARISAN	UMNO	IND
Alliance		BN-GRS
Popular vote	11,382	4,753	693
Percentage	64.06%	26.75%	3.90%
	Fourth party	Fifth party	Sixth party
Candidate	Arastam Pandorog	Karil Kuraini	Mohd. Hassan Abu Bakar
Party	PKR	PPRS	PEJUANG
Alliance	PH		GTA
Popular vote	562	150	130
Percentage	3.16%	0.84%	0.73%
	Seventh party
Candidate	Nazmahwati Wali
Party	PBM
Popular vote	98
Percentage	0.55%
MLA before election
Manis Muka Mohd Darah (died)
(WARISAN)
Elected MLA
Jamil Hamzah
(WARISAN)

The 2022 Bugaya by-election was a by-election held on 19 November 2022 for the Sabah State Legislative Assembly seat of Bugaya. It was called following the death of the incumbent, Manis Muka Mohd Darah on 17 November 2020. Manis Muka was a 2-term state assemblywoman first elected at the 2018 Sabah state election. She was a member of the Sabah Heritage Party (WARISAN).

The by-election was to be held within 60 days after the seat was declared vacant, however due to the COVID-19 pandemic in Sabah, then Prime Minister Muhyiddin Yassin advised the Yang di-Pertuan Agong to declare an emergency to postpone the by-election. The emergency proclamation was eventually revoked on 7 October 2022. The by-election was held concurrently with the 2022 Malaysian general election and the 2022 Malaysian state elections for the state assemblies of Pahang, Perak and Perlis.

== Nominations ==
Candidates for the Bugaya by-election has been set by Election Commission (EC) to be on 5 November, the same as the general election and the state election for Perak, Perlis and Pahang. After the nomination closed, 7 candidates were approved by EC: Jamil Hamzah from WARISAN, Abdul Aziz Mohd Ibno from Barisan Nasional (BN), Zulfadzli Shi Ahmad as independent, Karil Kuraini from Parti Perpaduan Rakyat Sabah (PPRS), Arastam Pandorog from Pakatan Harapan (PH), Hassan Abu Bakar from Homeland Fighter's Party (PEJUANG), and Nazmawati Walli from Parti Bangsa Malaysia (PBM).

Jamil, a syariah lawyer by trade, is the WARISAN Central Youth Exco member, and the party's Semporna branch committee member. He is also the nephew of the party leader Shafie Apdal, who announced Jamil's candidacy on 3 November.

Abdul Aziz were announced as BN candidate on 2 November. A former teacher, Abdul Aziz is the UMNO deputy chief for its Semporna branch. He has said that improving the basic infrastructure in the constituency would be his focus if he is elected. He also determined to resume projects under BN that were stopped after its defeat in the 2018 Sabah state election, such as building a hospital in Semporna.

The independent candidate, Jufazli Shi Ahmad or Zulfadzli Shi Ahmad is political activist and analyst, known for his outspoken views on Malaysian and Sabah politicians on social media such as Youtube and TikTok. He is said to be former Democratic Action Party (DAP) member (although the membership claim was disputed by DAP), and has been arrested in 2019 on charges on defamation against the Prime Minister at the time Mahathir Mohamad. He has contested in the 2020 state election before in the Tanjong Papat seat, losing his deposit after only gaining 553 votes. In his campaign, Zulfadzli stated he wants to help highlight the water and road in the area and improve it if he is elected. He has also cited his advantage as a local, having been born and raised in Kampung Bugaya, and also his ethnicity as a Bajau, which forms the majority in the constituency, to help him in the election. He also utilized his social media as his main campaign channel to the voters, going viral with his promises in one of his videos to build 'golden road' in the area, which he explained meant to be improving the potholed roads.

Arastam, the PH candidate from its People's Justice Party (PKR) component party, is a deep sea fish businessman by trade. The party's vice chief for its Semporna branch, Arastam were named by PKR on 31 October to contest the seat and also the federal seat of Semporna.

The PPRS candidate, Karil, is a former military personnel in the Malaysian Armed Forces. Karil has said his passion to 'defend the community' are his motivation to contest in the election.

Analysts such as Dr Romzi Ationg and Dr Zaini Othman saw the by-election to be a straight fight between 2 heavyweight parties in Sabah, WARISAN and BN despite having 7 candidates in the election.

== Results ==
Sabah state by-election, 19 November 2022: Bugaya Upon the death of incumbent, Manis Muka Mohd Darah
Party	Candidate	Votes	%	∆%
Sabah Heritage Party	Jamil Hamzah	11,382	64.06	-8.25
BN	Abdul Aziz Mohd Ibno	4,753	26.75	N/A
PH	Arastam Pandorog	562	3.16	N/A
Independent	Zulfadzli Shi Ahmad	693	3.90	N/A
Sabah People's Unity Party	Karil Kuraini	150	0.84	+0.43
PEJUANG	Mohd. Hassan Abu Bakar	130	0.73	N/A
PBM	Nazmahwati Wali	98	0.55	N/A
Total valid votes		17,768	100.00	
Total rejected ballots		?	?	?
Unreturned ballots		?	?	
Turnout		?	?	?
Registered electors		?		
Majority		6,629		
Bugaya hold		Swing		WARISAN

== Previous results ==
Sabah state election, 2020: Bugaya
Party	Candidate	Votes	%	∆%
Sabah Heritage Party	Manis Muka Mohd Darah	8,557	72.31	-2.55
PN	Mohd Daud Tampokong	2,552	21.56	N/A
Love Sabah Party	Jihek Basanu	115	0.97	N/A
USNO (Baru)	Ahmad Kenajaan	99	0.84	N/A
Independent	Rasidan Abdul Latiff	92	0.78	N/A
Sabah People's Unity Party	Taraji Jamdi	49	0.41	+0.01
Independent	Abdul Jan Muammil	31	0.26	N/A
Total valid votes		11,495	97.14	
Total rejected ballots		285	2.41	
Unreturned ballots		54	0.46	
Turnout		11,834	58.39	
Registered electors		20,267		
Majority		6,005		
Bugaya hold		Swing		WARISAN
Source(s) "RESULTS OF CONTESTED ELECTION AND STATEMENTS OF THE POLL AFTER THE OFFICIAL ADDITION OF VOTES".

== Aftermath ==
Jamil, the winner in the by-election, were sworn in as the new MLA for Bugaya in front of the Sabah Assembly Speaker on 25 November, at the start of the 3rd Session of the 16th Sabah Assembly sitting.
