= Matakhitswen =

Dr. Manu Ishaku Adda Ali
- His Majesty
- During his coronation

Paramount ruler of Wukari Federation and Chairman, Taraba State Council of Traditional Rulers;
- In office: 22 October 2022 - date
- Coronation: Wukari, Taraba State, Nigeria
- Predecessor: Kuvyon II (reigned 1976–2021)
- Born: 24 March 1946
- House: Ba Ma
- Father: Agbumanu V Adda Ali (reigned 1974–6)
- Religion: Christianity
- Occupation: Aku Uka

Matakhitswen (Manu Ishaku Adda Ali; born 24 March 1946) is the 25th Aku Uka (paramount ruler) of Kwararafa and 14th since the founding of the Wukari Federation, a Jukun tradition state in Middle Belt, Nigeria.

== Education and career ==
Matakhitswen has a Higher National Diploma in Forestry. He retired from the Nigerian civil service in the year 2000.

== Enthronement ==
Following the demise of the 24th Aku Uka, Kuvyon II, on 10 October 2021, a search began for the new occupant of the stool by the kingmakers from Abon-Achuwo, Abon-Ziken, Kinda-Achuwo, Kinda-Ziken, and Kun-Vyi. Princes from two ruling houses of Ba Ma and Ba Gya were present, and the mantle fell on the son of the 23rd Aku Uka, Manu Ishaku Adda Ali, from the Ba Ma ruling house.

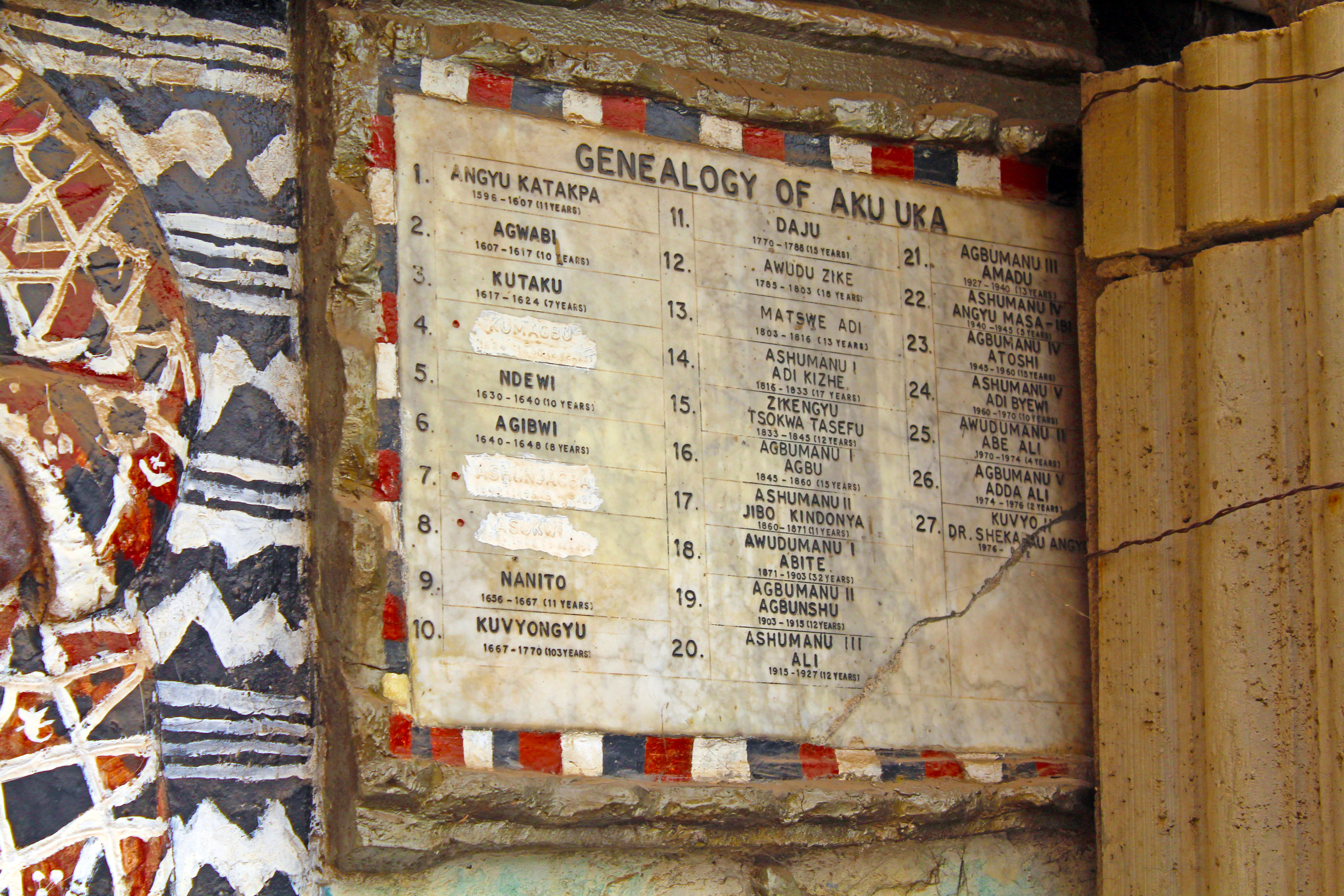
Genealogy of the Aku Uka

In accordance with the Pankan or Jukun tradition, Adda Ali was crowned on 28 January 2022, at Bye Vyi (Byepyi). As tradition required, rites and rituals were conducted at the Jukun traditional sites at Puje, Bye Vyi, and Kuntsa, before a large crowd awaited him on his return to Wukari. Other rites and rituals necessary for his acceptance as the new Aku Uka were conducted at Akwana, Arufu, and Wapan Nghaku.

The Taraba State Governor, Darius Ishaku, attended his coronation ceremony on 22 October 2022 and presented him with the staff of office, as did the governor of Plateau State, Solomon Lalong.

Matakhitswen Ba Ma Royal House Born: March 24, 1946
Regnal titles
Preceded by Kuvyon II	Aku Uka; 2022–date	Succeeded by Incumbent
