= Kuteb people =

West African ethnic group

Kuteb
Total population
- c. 602,000

Regions with significant populations
- Nigeria 600,000 (2005)
- Cameroon: 2,000 Kuteb

Languages
- Kuteb

Religion
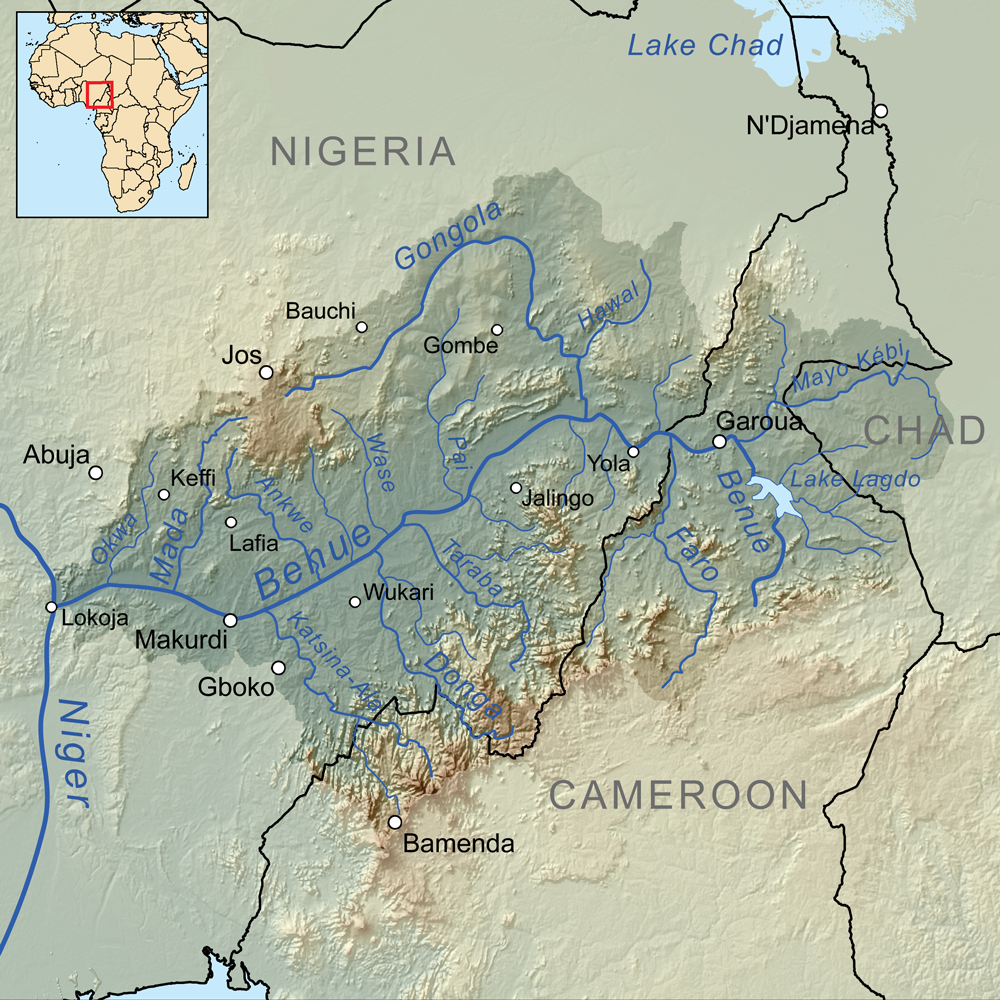
- Kuteb Traditional Religion, Christianity, Islam Benue river basin. The main Kuteb region is south of Wukari, west of the Donga River.

Related ethnic groups
- Jukun, Atyap, Tarok, Afizere, Irigwe, Bajju, Ham, Adara, Berom, Efik, Tiv, Igbo, Yoruba, Urhobo and other Benue-Congo peoples of Middle Belt and southern Nigeria

The Kuteb (or Kutep) people are an ethno-linguistic group in West Africa, who speak Kuteb, a Jukunoid language. Most of the Kuteb people reside in Taraba State, Nigeria.

== Background ==
According to tradition the Kuteb migrated from Egypt about 1000 AD, eventually reaching their present location around 1510. The Kuteb people are made of the following clans which is believed to be Children of Kuteb; Lumbu, Ticwo, Rufu, Askaen, Bika (Zwika), Ticwo, Rubur, Tswaen, Acha, Likam, Cwumam, and the Rucwu.

Traditionally they engaged in farming, hunting and fishing in the fertile lands of the Benue River basin. The people worshiped family idols, but also believed in a supreme being who created the world and brings health, rain and the harvest. They were ruled by a paramount priest king, the Kwe Kukwen, selected by a council of elders representing the different Kuteb clans. A 2007 report estimated the number of Kuteb people as approximately 100,000. Most live in what is now Takum Local Government Area of Taraba State, Nigeria, although there are a few Kuteb villages in Cameroon.

Under the British, who took control around 1900, the Kuteb were subject to the first-class Jukun ruler, or "Aku Uka" of the Wukari Federation. In 1914, the British made the Kwe Kukwen the only graded and third class chief in the Takum part of the confederation, with the title of Kwe Takum. He was made paramount over other peoples in the area. This change was resented by other ethnic groups of Hausa, Tiv, Chamba, Kukuns and Ichen, who forced the Ukwe Ahmadu Genkwe to leave Takum and reside elsewhere. The last Ukwe Takum was Ali Ibrahim, ruling from 1963 to 1996.

== Politics ==
The earliest direction for every activity in Kuteb land revolve round the theocratic role of the Kwe Kukwen, Akwen and Council of elders called Ndufu who represent the major known sub clans and extended families. Kukwen is the Chief-Priest located in Mbarikam, Ikam or Teekum and the Akwen are the minor priests who are heads of the other clans. This practice started with Kuteb himself as the paramount chief priest / King of the Kutebs. The Kwe Kukwen may be chosen from any clan. However, he must, on his election, come to reside in Teekum (Mbarikam Hill) being the ward of Likam and the Headquarters of the Kuteb Nation. The traditional Kuteb political system is thus federal in nature. Even though the Kutebs recognised the seniority of Likam, the other clans had some autonomy to exercise powers of maintaining peace, protecting and achieving the interest of their respective clan members. However, such power ended where collective interest and programmes of the entire nation was to begin and where the settlement of disputes between individuals and clans were brought before the Kwe Kukwen. In addition to the political role the Kukwen and Akwen have a spiritual role, responsibility and authority. The roles are rooted in the religious belief of the Kutebs.

== Chieftaincy stool issue ==
In the 1970s Takum was part of the old Benue Plateau State. The local government gazette recognized three main chieftaincy stools in the Wukari Federation for the Wukari, Donga and Takum local government areas, each to be elected by their indigenous people.

This law was changed by the governor Joseph Gomwalk in 1975, withdrawing the sole right of the Kuteb to select the holder of the Ukwe Chieftaincy stool of Takum from one of their two royal families. The Likam Tribe/clan and the Akente tribe/clan. These are two sons who are charged with the traditional paramount rulership of the Kuteb Nation. This is a traditional agreement by the twelve tribes of the Kuteb Nation. All the twelve/Clans have their own UKwe. However, the Likam Tribe and Akente tribe are allowed to rotate the paramount seat of Kingship among themselves. The maintain of the two tribes for rule in the paramount rule was a strategic Kuteb ancient formulation to protect the Kuteb Kingdom and maintain her sovereignty from other invaders and the change and usurpation of tradition, culture and customs unique Heritage of the Kuteb people. This is in line with protecting every indigenous tribe from extinction and incursion by imposters.

The new law allowed for election of a Chamba chief, while making a Jukun man chairman of the selection committee and altering the composition of the committee to include Jukun and Chamba as well as Hausa and Kuteb.

This is a violation of the ethnic right and traditional right to self-determination and the right to the cultural heritage as a people. The justification was the changing demographics of Takum, but the result was disturbances that caused the government to ban the traditional annual Kuchichebe festival when the land is blessed to ensure the next harvest will be fertile. Later, similar festivals were banned in other Wukari Federation areas due to the trouble they caused.

In October 1997 the Taraba State military administrator Amen Edore Oyakhire sent a paper called Comprehensive brief on the Chieftaincy Stool of Takum Chiefdom Taraba State to the Armed Forces Ruling Council. That month seven people were killed and seven houses razed in communal violence, and 31 people were arrested. Oyakhire said anyone suspected of involvement in the communal violence would be treated as detractors of the transition to civil rule. In 1998 the Taraba State Government also set up a Peace Committee which managed to negotiate a truce between the ethnic groups.

== Ongoing conflict ==
The Kuteb have been involved in ongoing violent conflicts with their neighbors. An ethnic crisis between the Jukun and Kuteb broke out in 1991. On 27 December 2008 another crisis erupted in Takum over an alleged killing of a Jukun youth by Kuteb youths. Perhaps 20 people died and thousands took refuge in the local military barracks.

In 2000 there was fighting between the Jukun/Chamba and Tiv people, with over 250 villages burned.

In 2006 violent clashes again began between the Kuteb and the Tiv, in which many people died. In a December 2008 press conference the Taraba State Governor, Danbaba Suntai, said he could see no end to the conflict.
