= Kuvyon II =

Dr. Shekarau Angyu Masa-Ibi Kuvyon II, CFR
- His Royal Majesty
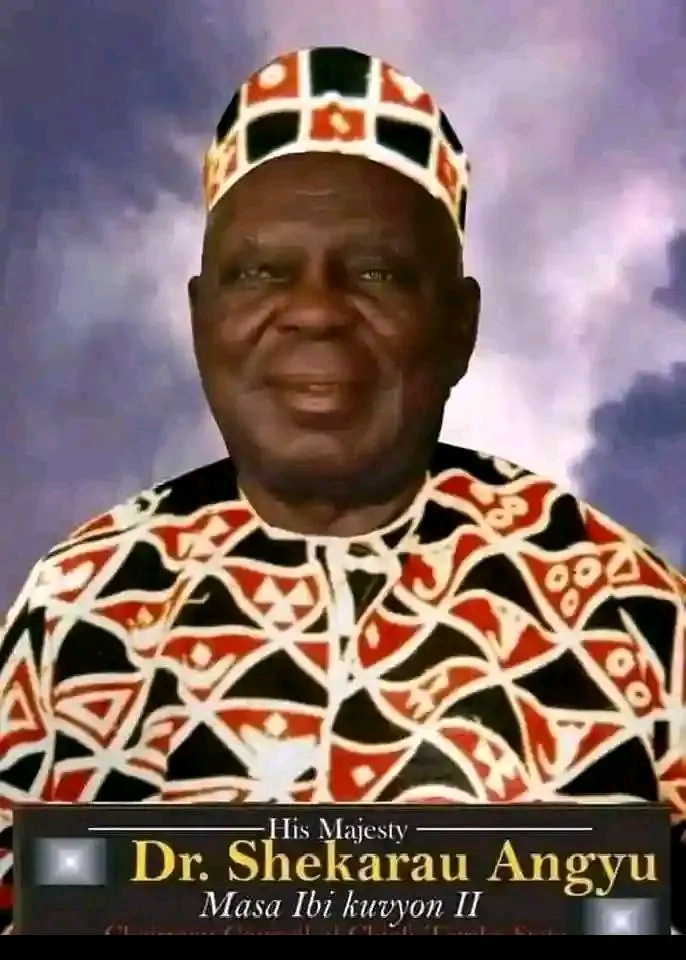
- During his 40th anniversary as Aku Uka, on March 17, 2017.

Monarch of Wukari Federation
- In office: 1976 - 2021
- Coronation: Bepi
- Predecessor: Ada Ali Agbumanu V (reigned 1974-6)
- Successor: Matakhitswen
- Born: 1937; Wukari, Northern Region, British Nigeria (now Wukari, Taraba State, Nigeria)
- Died: 10 October 2021 (aged 84); Wukari
- Burial: Wukari
- Spouse: Ayondo Kande Masa-Ibi (née Manu Aju Finshi) (m. 1961)
Names
- Shekarau Angyu Masa-Ibi
- Father: Angyu Masa-Ibi Ashumanu IV (reigned 1940-5)
- Religion: Christianity
- Occupation: • Aku Uka

Kuvyon II (Shekarau Angyu Masa-Ibi; 1937 – 10 October 2021) was the 27th (or 24th) Aku Uka (paramount ruler) of Kwararafa and 13th since the founding of the Wukari Federation, a Jukun tradition state in Middle Belt, Nigeria. He is also the chairman, Taraba State Council of Traditional Rulers and Chancellor, Federal University Dutse. He died on 10 October 2021, at the age of 84.

== Working career ==
Kuvyon II was, as of March 1961, a Personal Assistant to the Executive Officer in the Ministry of Animal Health, Kaduna, and then became a Personal Assistant to the Parliamentary Secretary, Northern Region. He was transferred to Lagos as Personal Assistant to the chairman, Electricity Corporation of Nigeria (ECN) in 1963, and finally retired from civil service after the January 1966 Military Coup to start a business enterprise in Makurdi, later a part of Benue-Plateau State.

== Enthronement ==
Masa-Ibi was crowned Kuvyon II at Byepi, in 1976 as the 27th monarch of Kwararafa and the 13th from the founding of the Wukari Federation. The 40th anniversary of his ascendancy to the throne was marked on Friday 17th and Saturday 18 March 2017, at the Kwararafa University permanent site, Wukari. Masa-Ibi died on 10 October 2021, after a brief illness.

As regards the prolonged land dispute between the Jukun and Tiv, Kuvyon II in August 2020 was said to have related the issue to a prolonged unresolved boundary adjustment.

== Personal life ==
As reported by PSR Magazine, Kuvyon II has been married to Ayondo Kande Masa-Ibi (née Manu Aju Finshi) since 1961, and the couple has ten children and is also blessed with grandchildren.

Kuvyon II Bagya Royal House Born: 1976 Died: 10 October 2021
Regnal titles
Preceded by Ada Ali Agbumanu V	Aku Uka; 1976–2021	Succeeded by Manu Ishaku Ada Ali
