= Xavante =

Indigenous people in Mato Grosso, Brazil

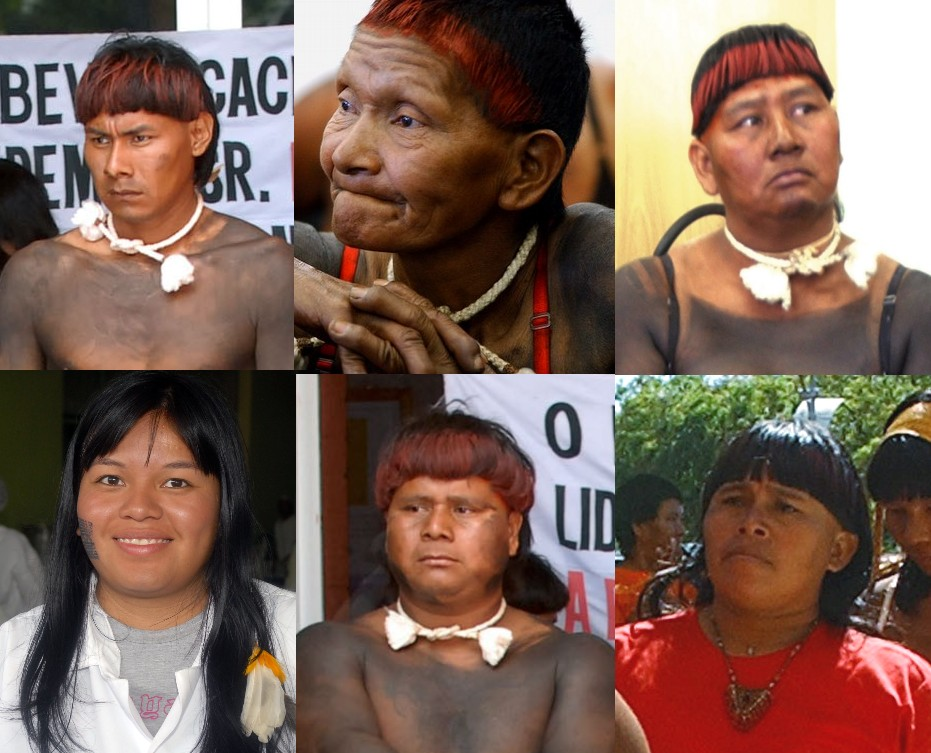

Total population
- 30,000

Regions with significant populations
- Brazil

Languages
- Xavante language

The Xavante (also Shavante, Chavante, Akuen, A'uwe, Akwe, Awen, or Akwen) are an Indigenous people, comprising about 30,000 individuals within the territory of eastern Mato Grosso state in Brazil. They speak the Xavante language, part of the Jê language family.

== History ==
They were enslaved in the 18th century, after which they have tried to avoid contact. A temporary coexistence with westernized society in the 19th century in the state of Goiás, was followed by withdrawal to Mato Grosso (between 1830 and 1860). They were "re-discovered" during the 1930s. From 1946 to 1957, they were brought under Getúlio Vargas' National Integration Program, but still experienced massacres and disease. Due to this history, they have a distrust of non-Xavante people. Today they are still wary of any approach of non-Xavante, called "waradzu".

The Xavante leader Mário Juruna was the first Indigenous Brazilian to become a federal representative.

The Xavante, like other Indigenous tribes, were treated badly by the government. Beginning in the 1960s, the Xavante were moved from their homeland in Mato Grosso to a southern, malnourished area of Brazil. There, thousands of natives died due to disease, famine, and warfare. Within the last decade, the Xavante have been relocated back to their original lands. Unfortunately, due to landgrabbing and squatters, the land was destroyed. Lush forest was burned to create sparse wasteland and pasture.

== Genetic origins ==
A 2015 genetic study reached a surprising conclusion about the origins of the Xavante people. Unlike other Native American peoples, the Paiter-Surui, Karitiana, and Xavante have an ancestry partially related to Indigenous Australasian populations of the Andaman Islands, New Guinea, and Australia. Scientists speculate that the relationship derives from an earlier people, called "Population Y", in East Asia from whence both groups diverged 15,000 to 30,000 years ago, the future Australasians migrating south and the remote ancestors of the Xavante northward finding their way to the New World and to the interior Amazon Basin.

== Culture ==
The people may be most famous for their dualistic societal structure. Two clans, the Âwawẽ and Po'reza'õno compose the culture, and marriage is not allowed between members of the same clan. An example of inter-clan relationships are the traditional log races, where the two clans compete in a race to carry palm tree trunks weighing as much as 80 kg to a defined point.

The Xavante are also known for their complex initiation rituals for young males, such as when small wooden sticks are inserted in the earlobes at the age of fourteen. As time passes, the size of these adornments is increased for the rest of their lives.

In 1996 the Brazilian heavy metal band Sepultura stayed and recorded with the Xavante people, who are featured on their album Roots. A small number of Xavante even travelled to São Paulo to partake in Sepultura's Barulho Contra Fome (Noise Against Hunger) concert in 1998 that marked the start of their tour for their follow-up album, Against, where their presence was featured in the music video for the song "Choke".
