= Charles Kingsley Meek =

British anthropologist (1885–1965)

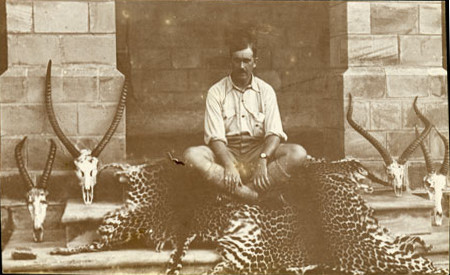
Charles Kingsley Meek in Southern Sudan

Charles Kingsley Meek FRGS FRAI (24 June 1885 – 27 March 1965), or just C. K. Meek, was a British anthropologist. He wrote about the northern and southern tribes of Nigeria and studied the Jukun people. Meek took photographs during some of his field work.

== Biography ==
Meek was born in Ballyloran, Larne, on 24 June 1885. He was educated at Bedford School and at Brasenose College, Oxford, where he studied theology. In 1912 he joined the colonial administrative service and was posted in northern Nigeria in 1912, where he became a District Officer and anthropologist. He was made Government Anthropologist under governor-general Frederick Lugard who sought to extend his policy of indirect rule south and wanted to know more about local practice. Meek attained the rank of Resident and transferred to the southern provinces of Nigeria in 1929 before resigning due to health issues in 1933.

In 1925, he published The Northern Tribes of Nigeria, which became a classic of African anthropology. His Sudanese Kingdom (1931), a study of the Jukun people and divine kingship, is a significant work of ethnography. In his book Law and Authority in a Nigerian Tribe published in 1937, Meek offers an anthropological study on the social organization of the Ibo tribe of Southern Nigeria. He did scholarly research with R. R. Marett and C. G. Seligman. He was a fellow in the Royal Geographical Society and Royal Anthropological Institute which awarded him its Wellcome Medal.

In 1943, Meek was elected as a senior research fellow at Brasenose College, Oxford. He retired in 1950 and died in Eastbourne on 27 March 1965.

== Works ==
- The Northern Tribes of Nigeria. An Ethnographical Account of the Northern Provinces of Nigeria together with a Report on the 1921 Decennial Census. [With a Preface by Sir Hugh Clifford] Oxford University Press, 1925. 2 vols.
- Tribal Studies in Northern Nigeria. London : Kegan Paul, Trench, Trubner, 1931
  - Volume 1: The Bachama and Mbula. The Bata-speaking peoples of the Adamawa Emirate. The Bura and Pabir tribes. The Kilba and Margi of Adamawa. Some mandated Tribes. The Chamba. The Verre. The Mumuye and neighbouring tribes. The Mambila (Mandates Territory).
  - Volume 2: The Katab and their neighbours. Some tribes of Zaria Province. Some tribes of Bornu Province. Some tribes of Adamawa Province. The Yugur-speaking peoples. Divine kings. Some tribes of the Cameroons. (The Ketab, Piti, Chawai, Kurama, Kare-Kare, Ngizim, Gamawa, Bolewa, Kanakuru, Longuda, Gabin, Hona, Mbum, Jibu, Jen, Kam, Tigong, Ndoro, Kentu, etc.)
- A Sudanese Kingdom : an ethnographical study of the Jukun-speaking peoples of Nigeria. London : Kegan Paul, Trench, Trubner, 1931
- Law and Authority in a Nigerian Tribe. Oxford: Oxford University Press ISBN 0-389-04031-2, 1937.
  - Law and Authority in a Nigerian Tribe: A Study in Indirect Rule. New York Barnes & Noble Imports 1970
- Europe And West Africa. Some Problems And Adjustments. Oxford University Press, 1940
- Land Law And Custom In The Colonies. With an introduction by Lord Hailey. Oxford University Press, London, 1946.
- Land tenure and land administration in Nigeria and the Cameroons (Colonial research studies; no.22) H.M.S.O, 1957
- The Niger and the Classics: The History of a Name. The Journal of African History. Vol. 1, No. 1, 1960.
