= Bugaya (state constituency) =

State constituency in Sabah, Malaysia

Bugaya (N66)
Sabah constituency

State constituency
- Legislature: Sabah State Legislative Assembly
MLA
Jamil Hamzah
Heritage
- Constituency created: 2003
- First contested: 2004
- Last contested: 2025

Demographics
- Electors (2025): 36,569

Bugaya is a state constituency in Sabah, Malaysia, that is represented in the Sabah State Legislative Assembly.

== Demographics ==
As of 2020, Bugaya has a population of 75,474 people.

Ethnic breakdown of Bugaya's electorate as of 2025
1. Muslim Bumiputera (96.0%)
2. Non-Muslim Bumiputera (3.00%)
3. Chinese (1.00%)
4. Other ethnicities (0.00%)

== History ==
=== Polling districts ===
According to the gazette issued on 31 October 2022, the Bugaya constituency has a total of 9 polling districts.

State constituency	Polling Districts	Code	Location
Bugaya（N66）	Semporna Darat	189/66/01	SK Gading-Gading
Bugaya（N66）	Sungai Tohok	189/66/02	SK Sungai Tohok
Bugaya（N66）	Bugaya	189/66/03	SK Bugaya
Bugaya（N66）	Tanjung Kapor	189/66/04	SK Tanjung Kapor
Bugaya（N66）	Bubul	189/66/05	SK Bubul; SK Bubul II
Bugaya（N66）	Kampong Ayer	189/66/06	SA Negeri Pekan Semporna
Bugaya（N66）	Lihak-Lihak	189/66/07	SK Lihak-Lihak
Bugaya（N66）	Simunul	189/66/08	SK Kampung Simunul
Bugaya（N66）	Bangau-Bangau	189/66/09	SJK (C) Nyuk Hwa

=== Representation history ===
Members of the Legislative Assembly for Bugaya
Assembly	No	Years	Name	Party
Constituency split from Kunak
12th	N54	2004-2008	Basali Tarireh @ Basalie Abdul Hamid	BN (UMNO)
13th	N54	2008-2013	Ramlee Marahaban	BN (UMNO)
14th	N54	2013-2018	Ramlee Marahaban	BN (UMNO)
15th	N54	2018- 2020	Manis Muka Mohd Darah	WARISAN
16th	N66	2020	Manis Muka Mohd Darah	WARISAN
16th	N66	2020-2022	Vacant (Note: Vacant from 17 November 2020 until the 2022 Malaysian general election due to the incumbent died in office. By-election was postponed due to 2021 Malaysian Proclamation of Emergency in order to curb the COVID-19 pandemic.)	
16th	N66	2022–2025	Jamil Hamzah	WARISAN
17th	N66	2025–present	Jamil Hamzah	WARISAN

== Election results ==
Sabah state election, 2025
Party	Candidate	Votes	%	∆%
Heritage	Jamil Hamzah	13,414	67.62	▲3.56
GRS	Noorudin Abdul Hussin	3,368	16.98	▲16.98
BN	Abdul Manan Indanan	1,794	9.04	▼17.71
PN	Jamil Abdul Gapar	450	2.27	▲2.27
Homeland Solidarity Party	Mohd Taha Mohd Daha	333	1.68	▲1.68
Sabah Clan Party	Suffian Ahmad	205	1.03	▲1.03
Sabah Dream Party	Arman Marasal	181	0.91	▲0.91
Pejuangan Rakyat	Roslan Ali	63	0.32	▲0.32
ASPIRASI	Maulana Unding	30	0.15	▲0.15
Total valid votes		19,838		
Total rejected ballots		454		
Unreturned ballots		56		
Turnout		20,348	55.64	▼0.45
Registered electors		36,569		
Majority		10,046	50.64	▲13.33
Sabah Heritage Party hold		Swing		
Source(s) "RESULTS OF CONTESTED ELECTION AND STATEMENTS OF THE POLL AFTER THE OFFICIAL ADDITION OF VOTES" (PDF).

Sabah state by-election, 19 November 2022 Upon the death of incumbent, Manis Muka Mohd Darah
Party	Candidate	Votes	%	∆%
Sabah Heritage Party	Jamil Hamzah	11,382	64.06	▼8.25
BN	Abdul Aziz Mohd Ibno	4,753	26.75	▲5.19
Independent	Jufazli Shi Ahmad @ Tongko	693	3.90	▲3.90
PH	Arastam Pandorog	562	3.16	▲3.16
Sabah People's Unity Party	Karil Pg Kuraini	150	0.84	▲0.84
Homeland Fighters' Party	Mohd Hassan Abu Bakar	130	0.73	▲0.73
PBM	Nazmahwati Wali	98	0.55	▲0.55
Total valid votes		17,768	96.69	
Total rejected ballots		482	2.62	
Unreturned ballots		126	0.69	
Turnout		18,376	56.09	▼2.30
Registered electors		32,761		
Majority		6,629	37.31	▼13.44
Sabah Heritage Party hold		Swing		
Source(s) "RESULTS OF CONTESTED ELECTION AND STATEMENTS OF THE POLL AFTER THE OFFICIAL ADDITION OF VOTES".

Sabah state election, 2020
Party	Candidate	Votes	%	∆%
Sabah Heritage Party	Manis Muka Mohd Darah	8,557	72.31	▼2.55
PN	Mohd Daud Tampokong	2,552	21.56	▲21.56
Love Sabah Party	Jihek Basanu	115	0.97	▲0.97
United Sabah National Organisation (Baru)	Ahmad Kenajaan	99	0.84	▲0.84
Independent	Rasidan Abdul Latiff	92	0.78	▲0.78
Sabah People's Unity Party	Taraji Jamdi	49	0.41	▲0.01
Independent	Abdul Jan Muammil	31	0.26	▲0.26
Total valid votes		11,495	97.14	
Total rejected ballots		285	2.41	
Unreturned ballots		54	0.46	
Turnout		11,834	58.39	▼13.21
Registered electors		20,267		
Majority		6,005	50.75	▼4.35
Sabah Heritage Party hold		Swing		
Source(s) "RESULTS OF CONTESTED ELECTION AND STATEMENTS OF THE POLL AFTER THE OFFICIAL ADDITION OF VOTES".

Sabah state election, 2018
Party	Candidate	Votes	%	∆%
Sabah Heritage Party	Manis Muka Mohd Darah	10,662	74.86	▲74.86
BN	Razak Sakaran Dandai	2,811	19.76	▼35.62
PAS	Mahamod Sarahil	144	1.01	▼4.84
Sabah Nationality Party	Kulli Maralam	67	0.47	▲0.47
Sabah People's Unity Party	Said Tiblan	57	0.40	▲0.40
Independent	Abdul Muksin Mohammad Hassan	15	0.11	▲0.11
Total valid votes		13,756	96.71	
Total rejected ballots		381	2.68	
Unreturned ballots		87	0.61	
Turnout		14,224	71.60	▼4.80
Registered electors		19,865		
Majority		7,851	55.10	▲25.89
Sabah Heritage Party gain from BN		Swing		?
Source(s) "RESULTS OF CONTESTED ELECTION AND STATEMENTS OF THE POLL AFTER THE OFFICIAL ADDITION OF VOTES".

Sabah state election, 2013
Party	Candidate	Votes	%	∆%
BN	Ramlee Marahaban	6,642	55.38	
Independent	Abdul Hussin Kiamsin	3,139	26.17	
PAS	Hasai Tudai	702	5.85	
Independent	Alimin Budin	638	5.32	
Independent	Atal Mohd Abdul Menang	201	1.68	
Independent	Abdullah Sani Abdul Salleh	191	1.59	
Total valid votes		11,513	96.00	
Total rejected ballots		455	3.79	
Unreturned ballots		25	0.21	
Turnout		11,993	76.40	
Registered electors		15,697		
Majority		3,503	29.21	
BN hold		Swing		
Source(s) "KEPUTUSAN PILIHAN RAYA UMUM DEWAN UNDANGAN NEGERI".

Sabah state election, 2008
Party	Candidate	Votes	%	∆%
On the nomination day, Ramlee Marahaban won uncontested.
BN	Ramlee Marahaban			
Total valid votes				
Total rejected ballots				
Unreturned ballots				
Turnout				
Registered electors				
Majority				
BN hold		Swing		
Source(s) "KEPUTUSAN PILIHAN RAYA UMUM DEWAN UNDANGAN NEGERI SABAH BAGI TAHUN 2008".

Sabah state election, 2004
Party	Candidate	Votes	%
BN	Basali Tarireh @ Basalie Abdul Hamid	3,857	60.66
Independent	Abdul Hussin Kiamsin	1,861	29.27
Independent	Abdullah Sani Abdul Salleh	351	5.52
Total valid votes		6,069	95.45
Total rejected ballots		249	3.92
Unreturned ballots		40	0.63
Turnout		6,358	60.33
Registered electors		10,539	
Majority		1,996	31.39
This was a new constituency created.
Source(s) "KEPUTUSAN PILIHAN RAYA UMUM DEWAN UNDANGAN NEGERI SABAH BAGI TAHUN 2004".
