= Mário Juruna =

Brazilian politician

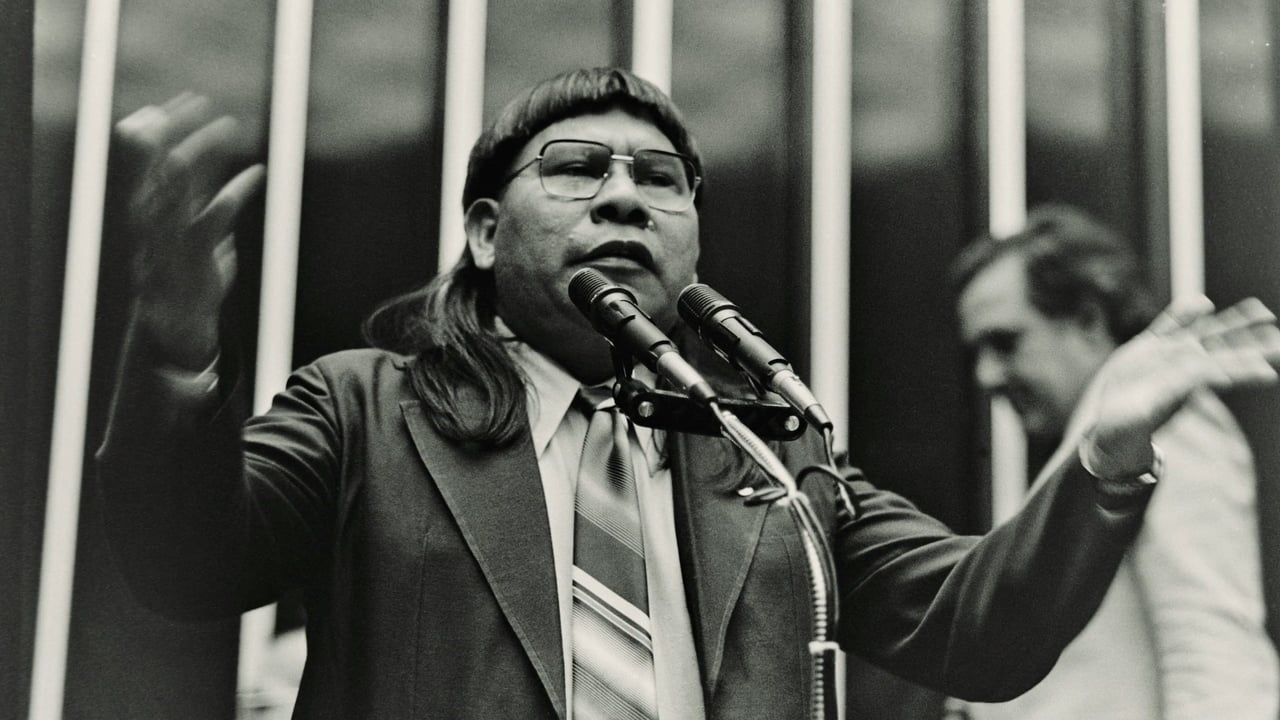

Mário Juruna (September 3, 1942 or 1943 – July 18, 2002) was the first national-level federal representative in Brazil that belonged to an indigenous people.

== Biography ==
He was born in Namurunjá village, near Barra do Garças, in the state of Mato Grosso, the son of the Xavante cacique (chief) Apoenã. He lived in the jungle, without contact with outside civilization, until the age of 17, when he became cacique.

In the 1970s he became famous for walking the halls of FUNAI, in Brasília to fight for land rights of Indians, while carrying a tape recorder, which he used to record everything that was said to him and to prove that the authorities, in most cases, did not keep their word.

He was elected to the Chamber of Deputies of Brazil by the Democratic Labour Party from 1983–1987, representing Rio de Janeiro. His election had strong repercussions in Brazil and the world. He was responsible for the creation of a permanent commission for Indians, which brought formal recognition to issues related to Indians. In 1984, he denounced the businessman Calim Eid for having attempted to bribe him to vote for Paulo Maluf, the presidential candidate supported by the military regime then in power. He voted for Tancredo Neves, the democratic opposition candidate. He was not reelected in 1986, but he remained active in politics for several years. With his mandate ended, and abandoned by his tribe, he remained in Brasília and died on July 18, 2002, due to complications from diabetes.
