= Manis Muka Mohd Darah =

Malaysian politician (1954–2020)

Yang Berbahagia Datin Manis Muka Mohd Darah

Member of the Sabah State Legislative Assembly for Bugaya
- In office 9 May 2018 – 17 November 2020
- Preceded by: Ramlee Marahaban
- Succeeded by: Jamil Hamzah
- Majority: 7,851 (2018); 6,005 (2020)

Personal details
- Born: 8 October 1954 Semporna, North Borneo (now Sabah, Malaysia)
- Died: 17 November 2020 (aged 66) Kota Kinabalu, Sabah, Malaysia
- Resting place: Kampung Bugaya Mosque Muslim Cemetery
- Party: UMNO (formerly); WARISAN

Datin Manis Muka binti Mohd Darah (8 October 1954 – 17 November 2020) was a Malaysian politician. She was a candidate for the Sabah Heritage Party for the Bugaya State Constituency (DUN) seat.

== Political career ==
She started her political career in 1985 and previously held several positions including Semporna UMNO Women Chief, then after her exit from UMNO she became Semporna WARISAN Women Chief after her entry into the party.

In the 2020 Sabah state election, Manis Muka defended the Bugaya state seat, facing a seven-cornered contest with candidates from the National Alliance (PN), United Sabah National Organization (USNO), Parti Perpaduan Rakyat Sabah (PPRS), Parti Cinta Sabah (PCS). and two independent candidates. With a majority of 6,005 votes, she managed to overcome her six challengers.

== Personal life ==
Manis Muka said about the origin of her name:

"Actually this name is the origin of my ancestors because in the past in the archipelago (an island in Semporna), the most beautiful woman was named Manis Muka. That's why my late parent gave me the name Manis Muka,".

There was an error during registration when the name that should have been registered was misspelled as "Manis Buka" (Sweet Open). She is the mother of 10 children, five sons and five daughters.

She has claimed that her ancestors were from Simunul, Tubig Indangan in the Southern Philippines, and she and her ancestors have Spanish origins.

== Death ==
Manis Muka died on 17 November 2020, at the age of 66, after being admitted to the Intensive Care Unit of Gleneagles Kota Kinabalu Hospital due to kidney problems. Her remains was laid to rest at the Kampung Bugaya Mosque Muslim Cemetery before the Subuh prayers. Prior to her death, Manis Muka had previously also tested positive for COVID-19, during the COVID-19 pandemic in Malaysia.

== Election results ==
Sabah State Legislative Assembly
Year	Constituency		Votes	Pct	Opponent(s)	Votes	Pct	Ballots cast	Majority	Turnout
2018	N54 Bugaya, P189 Semporna	Manis Buka Mohd Darah (WARISAN)	10,662	77.51%	Razak Sakaran Dandai (UMNO)	2,811	20.43%	14,137	7,851	71.60%
2018	N54 Bugaya, P189 Semporna	Manis Buka Mohd Darah (WARISAN)	10,662	77.51%	Mahamod Sarahil (PAS)	144	1.05%	14,137	7,851	71.60%
2018	N54 Bugaya, P189 Semporna	Manis Buka Mohd Darah (WARISAN)	10,662	77.51%	Kulli Maralam (PKS)	67	0.49%	14,137	7,851	71.60%
2018	N54 Bugaya, P189 Semporna	Manis Buka Mohd Darah (WARISAN)	10,662	77.51%	Said Tiblan (PPRS)	57	0.41%	14,137	7,851	71.60%
2018	N54 Bugaya, P189 Semporna	Manis Buka Mohd Darah (WARISAN)	10,662	77.51%	Abd Muksin Mohammad Hassan (IND)	15	0.11%	14,137	7,851	71.60%
2020	N66 Bugaya, P189 Semporna	Manis Muka Mohd Darah (WARISAN)	8,557	74.44%	Mohd Daud Tampokong (BERSATU)	2,552	22.20%	11,495	6,005	56.72%
2020	N66 Bugaya, P189 Semporna	Manis Muka Mohd Darah (WARISAN)	8,557	74.44%	Jihek Basanu (PCS)	115	1.00%	11,495	6,005	56.72%
2020	N66 Bugaya, P189 Semporna	Manis Muka Mohd Darah (WARISAN)	8,557	74.44%	Ahmad Kenajaan (USNO Baru)	99	0.86%	11,495	6,005	56.72%
2020	N66 Bugaya, P189 Semporna	Manis Muka Mohd Darah (WARISAN)	8,557	74.44%	Rasidan Abd Latiff (IND)	92	0.80%	11,495	6,005	56.72%
2020	N66 Bugaya, P189 Semporna	Manis Muka Mohd Darah (WARISAN)	8,557	74.44%	Taraji Jamdi (PPRS)	49	0.43%	11,495	6,005	56.72%
2020	N66 Bugaya, P189 Semporna	Manis Muka Mohd Darah (WARISAN)	8,557	74.44%	Abdul Jan Muammil @ Abdul Jim (IND)	31	0.27%	11,495	6,005	56.72%
