= Yaji I =

Ali Yaji Dan Tsamiya

King of Kano
- Reign: 1349 – 1385
- Predecessor: Usman Zamnagawa
- Successor: Kingdom abolished

Sultan of Kano
- Reign: 1349–1385
- Predecessor: Sultanate established
- Successor: Bugaya
- House: Bagauda Dynasty
- Father: Tsamiya
- Religion: Sunni Islam

Ali Dan Tsamiya (Hausa pronunciation) known as Yaji I or Ali Yaji Dan Tsamiya (Hausa pronunciation) was a king and later the first Sultan of Kano, a state in what is now Northern Nigeria. Yaji I ruled from 1349 to 1385 CE. A prominent figure in the state's history, Yaji used a religious revolution to finally solidify his family's grasp on Kano and its sub-kingdoms after centuries of strife. He was also responsible for the absorption of Rano into Kano.

Since the arrival of the first king of Kano, Bagauda in 999, there had been tension between the newly established aristocracy and the indigenous pagans of Kano. All subsequent Kano Kings engaged in feuds with the pagan population but were unable to gain mastery over them. In 1350, Yaji aided by Soninke Wangara scholars from Mali, relinquished the Hausa Animist Cult of Tsumbubura, and proclaimed Kano a Sultanate.

He violently crushed a subsequent rebellion by the animist cult at the Battle of Santolo, waging in the processes the first Islamic Jihad in Sudanic Africa. He conquered the Kwararafa and the numerous Hausa kingdoms around Kano laying the seeds for Kanoan dominance in the Bilad as-Sudan. He died in 1385 having laid the seeds for an eventual Kanoan Empire.

== Early life ==
Ali Yaji was born to the unfortunate 9th King of Kano, Tsamiya and his consort Maganarku. His bad temper as a child earned him the epithet "Yaji", which is known today as a Hausa spice mix.

== King of Kano ==
He became the 11th king of Kano in 1343, succeeding his uncle, Usman Zamnagawa who deposed and murdered his father. Yaji immediately engaged in multiple conquests in Zamna Gaba, Rano and Bunu, reigning at Bunu for two years before proceeding to Kur where he decided to remain. The Chronicle mentions that Yaji expelled the King of Rano from Zamna Gaba, presumably signaling Kano's suzerainty of the Hausa State of Rano.

=== Establishing Islam in Kano ===
Though there were elements of the islamic religion in kano, It was during Yaji's reign that Islam became the prominent faith in the kingdom. According to the Kano Chronicles, about forty Soninke Wangara scholars from Mali, led by Abdulrahman Zaite fully converted the King to the Islamic faith after which Yaji proclaimed himself a Sultan. The chronicles listed names of some of the other scholars as Yakubu, Mandawali, Famori, Bilkasirn, Kanaji, Dukere, Sheshe, Kebe, Murtuku, Liman Jibjin Yallabu, the father of Sarkin Pawa, Gurdumlius, Auta, Laual, Liman Madata.

Yaji made Zaite Alkali (Qadi), Laual Muezzin, and Gurdamus his Liman (Imam). Auta was also charged with ensuring all animals were slaughtered according to Dhabihah. Yaji then commanded his subjects in all the towns of Kano to observe the five daily salahs to which they obliged. He also built a mosque facing the Kaaba underneath the Kano Sacred Tree.

The Sarkin Gazarzawa was however against these new practices and would desecrate their mosque after every prayer. Because of this, a man called Danbugi was put in charge of a militia to guard the mosque. The pagans however would not relent and tried to entice Danbugi and his men away and were able to succeed in luring some of them. Sheshe and Famori decided that the only way to stop the desecration was through prayer and gathered the Muslims for that purpose. According to the Kano Chronicle, the leader of the pagans was struck blind shortly afterwards and soon after all his acolytes involved in befouling the mosque. Yaji was then said to have taunted the leader of the pagans, " Be thou Sarki among the blind".

=== Battle of Santolo and Further Conquests ===
"Yaji, conqueror of the rocky heights, scatterer of hosts, lord of the town"

Yaji, encouraged by his ordeal with the rebellious pagans decided to further spread the religion. For this reason he set his sights on conquering Santolo, the stronghold of the pagans in Kano because he believed every other town will follow him if he was able to succeed. His Wangara counselors advised him that they should pray beside the Moat of Santolo before they wage war. Yaji and his army camped at a place in Santolo called Duji, after which they proceeded to march around Santolo praying until daybreak when a battle ensued. Yaji scored a crucial victory against the pagans in the Battle of Santolo, which would see him hold further successful conquest south of Kano. This culminated in a confrontation with the Kwararafa, where its inhabitants were said to have deserted their land in fear, taking refuge on a hill in Tagara. The Sultan tried to wait them out to force a battle but they instead sent him a hundred slaves to appease him. There are conflicting reports as to whether he died in Kwararafa or after he returned to Kano. He ruled Kano for thirty seven years after which he was succeeded by his brother, Muhammad Bugaya.

== Personal life ==
Yaji had a son Kanajeji with Aunaka. Kanajeji became the 13th ruler of Kano. Yaji shared the same father and mother with Sarki Muhammad Bugaya which was unusual or Kanoan rulers in that era due to excess polygamy.

== Legacy ==
Yaji I is considered to be one of the greatest rulers and warriors in Kano's history. He is remembered as the first Sultan of Kano and for waging the first Islamic jihad in region. Yaji's actions were pivotal as they cleared the path for Kano's eventual supremacy among the Hausa states and in Sudanic Africa.

== Biography in the Kano Chronicle ==
Below is a full biography of Yaji I from Palmer's 1908 English translation of the Kano Chronicle.

The 11th Sarki was Yaji, called Ali. His mother was Maganarku. He was called Yaji because he had a bad temper when he was a boy, and the name stuck to him.

He drove the Serikin Rano from Zamna Gaba, went to Rano, and reigned at Bunu 2 years. Then he removed to Kur together with the Ajawa and Worjawa and Aurawa. He stayed there.

In Yaji's time the Wongarawa came from Mele, bringing the Muhammadan religion. The name of their leader was Abdurahaman Zaite. Others were Yakubu, Mandawali, Famori, Bilkasim, Kanaji, Bukere, Sheshe, Kebe, Murtuku, Liman Jibjin Yallabu, the father of Serikin Pawa, Gurdumus, Auta, Laual, Liman Madatai and others—about 40 in all. When they came they commanded the Sarki to observe the times of prayer. He complied, and made Gurdamus his Liman, and Laual his Muezzin. Auta cut the throats of whatever flesh was eaten. Mandawali was Liman of all the Wongarawa and of the chief men of Kano. Zaite was their Alkali.

The Sarki commanded every town in Kano country to observe the times of prayer. So they all did so. A mosque was built beneath the sacred tree facing east, and prayers were made at the five appointed times in it.

The Sarkin Gazarzawa was opposed to prayer, and when the Moslems after praying had gone home, he would come with his men and defile the whole mosque and cover it with filth. Danbugi was told off to patrol round the mosque with well-armed men from evening until morning. He kept up a constant halloo. For all that the pagans tried to win him and his men over. Some of his men followed the pagans and went away, but he and the rest refused. The defilement continued till Sheshe said to Famori, “There is no cure for this but prayer.” The people assented. They gathered together on a Tuesday in the mosque at the evening hour of prayer and prayed against the pagans until sunrise. They only came away when the sun was well up. Allah received graciously the prayers addressed to him. The chief of the pagans was struck blind that day, and afterwards all the pagans who were present at the defilement—they and all their women. After this they were all afraid.

Yaji turned the chief of the pagans out of his office and said to him, “Be thou Sarki among the blind.” In the days of Yaji, it is said, Sarkin Debbi, Sarkin Dab and Sarkin Gano brought horses to Kano, but this story is not worthy of credence.

Yaji said to the Wongarawa,“I want you to make prayer so that I may conquer the men of Santolo, for if I conquer Santolo every town in the country will follow me, since Santolo is the key of the south.”

They said, “We will pray for you—but we will not pray except beside the moat of Santolo itself.”

So the Sarki set forth together with the Wongarawa, and they went to Santolo. He had with him 111 men. 50 of them were in front of the Wongarawa and 60 in front of himself. The chief among his men were Jarumai Gobarra Dagga Samma, Jakafada Kulli, Ragumar Giwa, Makama Butache, Maidawaki Koamna, Berdi Sheggi, Sarki Zaura Gamati, Dan Buram Gantururu, Dan Maköo Dagazo, Galadima Tuntu and Sarkin Surdi Maguri. Others were Gauji, Garoji, Tankarau, Kargagi, Karfasha, Kutunku Toro, Kampachi, Gorongiwa the Galadima, Zaki, Bamboli and others—altogether 60.

Now when he came to Santolo, the Sarki camped near Duji. Duji was the name of a man. In the dead of night the Wongarawa went to Santolo together with Yaji and marched round the city and prayed till daybreak. When the day broke they returned to their camp. When the sun was up they returned to Santolo eager for battle. The men of Santolo came out of the town and met them in the open. Fighting went on from morning until night. Neither side prevailed. The Kanawa retired to Duji; the men of Santulu returned to their homes. The Sarkin Kano was very sore at heart. Famori said, “Do not be grieved! if Allah so wills we will defeat them.”

The Sarki was pleased with his talk. Kosa, the Sarki’s slave, said, “My lord, I will tell you the secrets of the enemy; there are 8 men inside the city and no one can pass the moat unless he kills them.”

Famori said, “Do you know their names?”

He said, “I know them.”

So Famori said, “What are their names?”

And Kosa replied, “The name of the greatest is Hambari, and after him Gwoshin Bauna, Kafiwuta, Gurgurra Karifi, Gandar Giwa, Hamburkin Toka, Zan Kaddakere and Gumbar Wakke.”

Gwoji said, “If I see Hambari I will kill him, if Allah so wills.”

At sunrise the Sarki returned to the attack on Santolo with black looks. He took a spear in his hand. Gwoji was in front of him, Zaite was on his right hand, Famori on his left, and behind him was Sheshe. Behind them were the rest of the Wongarawa and Kanawa. When they came near to Santolo all the pagans came out to battle. Gwoji saw Hambari, and girding up his loins dashed into the fray. The pagans rushed at Gwoji, but he withstood them, and when they gave way, lunged at Hambari with his spear. Hambari caught him by the throat and dragged him from his horse; but in vain, for Gwoji drew his knife, and ran him through, and so he died. Then Gwoji mounted his horse and entered Santolo, and all the Kanawa followed him and stormed the town. The Sarki commanded all the inhabitants to be killed except women and little children. Gwoji entered the place of their god, with Kosa and Guragu, and found a bell, and two horns, a battle-axe and leg-irons. Gwoji took the bell and the two horns. Kosa took the battle-axe, and Guragu the leg-irons. Yaji stayed seven days in the town and destroyed the place of sacrifice, and after dismantling its wall and tree, returned to Kano. He said to Gwoji, “Choose whatever you want.”

Gwoji said, “I only want to become Madawakin Kano.”

The Sarki said, “I give you the office.”

Gasatoro, who was turned out of the post of Madawaki, built a house at Gawo, and for that reason was known as Madawakin Gawo, to distinguish the two.

The next year the Sarki went to war with Warji and stayed there some time. At this time all the pagan tribes were subject to him, from Biyri to Panda. The Kworarafa alone refused to follow him, so he went to their country. When he came to their town, they were afraid to fight and all fled up the hill at Tagara. The Sarki camped there also for seven months. Ko one came down from the rock. At last the pagans paid him a hundred slaves. Because of this the song in praise of Yaji was made, which runs: “Yaji, conqueror of the rocky heights, scatterer of hosts, lord of the town.” It is said that he died here at Kworarafa. Perhaps he died at Kano.

He ruled 37 years.

— Kano Chronicle

Preceded by Osumanu Zamnagawa	Sarkin Kano; 1349-1385	Succeeded by Bugaya
