= Akwen =

Brazilian ethnic group

The Akwén or Akwẽ are a Jê people, who come from Brazil and the South American Caribbean coast. Their language belongs to the central branch of the Jê family (trunk Macro-Ge) and has great linguistic proximity with the languages spoken by the Xavante and the Xacriabá.

The people Akwén, speaker of the language 'Akwén', 'Akwẽ', 'Xerente', 'Cherente', 'Sherente', 'Serente' or Akwẽ Mrmẽze ("speech of the people") is organized into six 'clans' ("dasiwawi mno"), divided into two 'parties' or "halves" ("dasĩmpko mno"). These two halves are named 'Doi' and 'Wahirê', associated with 'sun' ('BDA': also 'god') and 'moon' (′WA′), respectively. Among them, the six clans are divided into two equal parts: Krito Tdêkwa, Kbazi Tdêkwa, Kuzâp Tdêkwa on the one hand, and Krozake Tdêkwa, Wahirê Tdêkwa, Krẽprehi Tdêkwa on the other.

The body painting are different in each of the parties, prevailing the circle in the half ′Doi′, and stroke, which identifies the clans belonging to the ′Wahirê′ half.
