= Battle of Santolo =

14th century battle

- Part of Rise of the Kano Sultanate
Date	1349
Location	Santolo Hill, Kano State
Result	Decisive Kanoan Victory

Belligerents
Kingdom of Santolo	Sultanate of Kano

Commanders and leaders
Magajin Santolo	Ali Yaji Dan Tsamiya

Strength
1,000 archers, 25 Cavalry..	8 Thousand Infantry, 2,000 Cavalry.

Casualties and losses
1,000 Infantry, 25 Cavalry	Unknown

The Battle of Santolo was a decisive battle between the newly declared Kano Sultanate and the Animist Hausa Kingdom of Santolo, it was the first recorded Islamic jihad waged and fought in Sudanic Africa.

== Background ==
In the 14th century, Islamic influence from the Mali empire had crept into Hausaland. In 1349, the King of Kano Ali Yaji I dissolved the cult of Tsumbubura, the powerful theocratic cult of the Hausa Animist religion, this sparked a wave of rebellion throughout the kingdom. At some point afterwards, the remnant of the high priests of the cult converged on Santolo, an important seat of Hausa Animism. Invigorated by religious zeal, the new 'Sultan', with the support of Wangara Muslims, descended on Santolo where the battle was fought.

== Repercussions ==
The Battle of Santolo was to be the first in a wave conquest soon to be initiated by the Sultanate of Kano, a wave that was to see Kanoan power culminating into a Hausa Empire in the reign Sultan Muhammadu Kisoki whom according to Sultan Muhammed Bello of Sokoto, " was to rule the length and breath of Hausaland, from the east to the west".

== See also ==
- Yaji I
