= Kwararafa Confederacy =

Hausa multi ethnic state from 1500 to 1840

Kwararafa
- c. 13th/14th/15th century–c. 1840
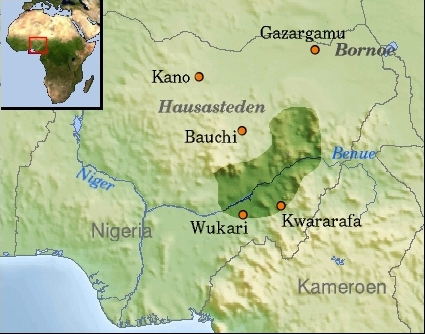
- Status: Confederation
- Capital: Santolo (first); Pindiga or Tagara; Bepi/Kwararafa; Uka; Wukari
- Common languages: Jukun Takum language
- Religion: Traditional African religion
- Aku and Sangari
- Historical era: Middle Ages
  - Established: c. 13th/14th/15th century
  - Disestablished: c. 1840
Preceded by	Succeeded by
Nok culture	Wukari Federation

Kwararafa (Hausa: Kororofa) was a multiethnic state and confederacy centered along the Benue River Valley in what is today central Nigeria. It was situated south of the Hausa States and southwest of the Bornu Empire. Kwararafa rose to prominence before 1500, and terrorised its more powerful neighbours in the 17th century. It declined throughout the 18th century due to various factors, and had collapsed by the early 19th century. The Jukun dynasty of the Wukari kingdom took control of the remains of the Kwararafa state. The period of Kwararafa's martial expansion and hegemony remains prominent in the oral traditions of the Benue Valley.

The connection of the "Kororofa" in the Kano Chronicle to the Jukun was first made by a colonial officer, possibly incentivised to empower indirect rule through the Jukun over other groups. There is also virtually no record of Kwararafa's invasions north in the oral traditions of the Benue Valley, and Kwararafa's history is largely pieced together by accounts of outsiders. As such a minority of scholars have doubted whether the confederation existed at all.

== Name ==
Kororofa was a collective name given by Muslim inhabitants of the Central Sudan in the north to a number of pagan peoples of the Middle Belt. Kororo-afa means "the salt people". Kwararafa had no meaning among the Jukun.

== History ==
=== Origins ===
The Benue Valley of the Middle Belt has long been inhabited by various ethnic groups. Its location as an interregional commercial centre contributed significantly to the emergence of Kwararafa. The wealth accumulated from this allowed groups to purchase horses from the Hausa, as cavalry was used to spread political and religious influence. Santolo, the first capital of the state, was founded circa 1000. Oral traditions indicate that professional hunters were chosen as military leaders, such as Gidi-Gidi, who founded Pindiga, and Katakpa, who founded Wukari. Although the Jukun are traditionally assumed to be the founders of the state, the inclusion of Kwararafa as a bastard Hausa state ("Hausa Banza") in the tradition of Bayajidda indicates the confederation was initially founded by the Abakwariga (non-Muslim Hausa) Kutumbuwa dynasty, who were later replaced by the Jukun, however there is too little workable evidence to be certain.

The period of Kwararafa's martial expansion and hegemony is prominent in the oral traditions of the Benue Valley. While it is debateable that the Jukun were ever military leaders of the state, at least in the 19th century Jukun religion (Ayaku) played an important unifying role in the multi-ethnic state, and in the emergence of divine kingship, as the Aku Uka (king) of Wukari was considered the representative of God on Earth. Leaders such as Aku and the Abakwariga's Sangari aimed to promote unity and peace within the confederation. Today many groups claim links to Kwararafa, such as the Abakwariga, Alago, Karam, Gwana, Pindiga, Kona, Kundi, Idoma, and Jukun, indicating it was a confederacy. The state's capitals (variously said to have been Santolo, Pindiga, Tagara, Bepi/Kwararafa, Uka, and Wukari) likely changed due to the transferring of dominance between groups in the confederation. The state was situated south of the Hausa Kingdoms and southwest of the Bornu Empire.

Under the Kutumbuwa dynasty, Kwararafa rivalled and competed with the Hausa Bakwai states, particularly Kano, over control of trade routes. In early confrontations, the Hausa Bakwai had the upper hand. In 1260, according to a Katsina account, Katsina's ruler (Korau) fought a war against Kwararafa. During the rule of Yaji (1349–1385), Kano captured Santolo and destroyed the religious centre of the city crucial to traditional religious practices. In 1380, possibly immediately after the conquest, the centre of Kwararafa shifted to Tagara. Kano extracted annual tribute from Kwararafa, including 100 slaves. Kwararafa also paid tribute to Kano under the rule of Kanajegi (1390-1410). Kwararafa was defeated in battle by Zazzau's infamous Amina, and they paid tribute to Zazzau for most of the 15th century. In the late 15th century, Kwararafa suffered a devastating defeat by Bornu, after which the capital moved to Bepi/Kwararafa. It is possibly this defeat which ended the rule of the Kutumbuwa dynasty.

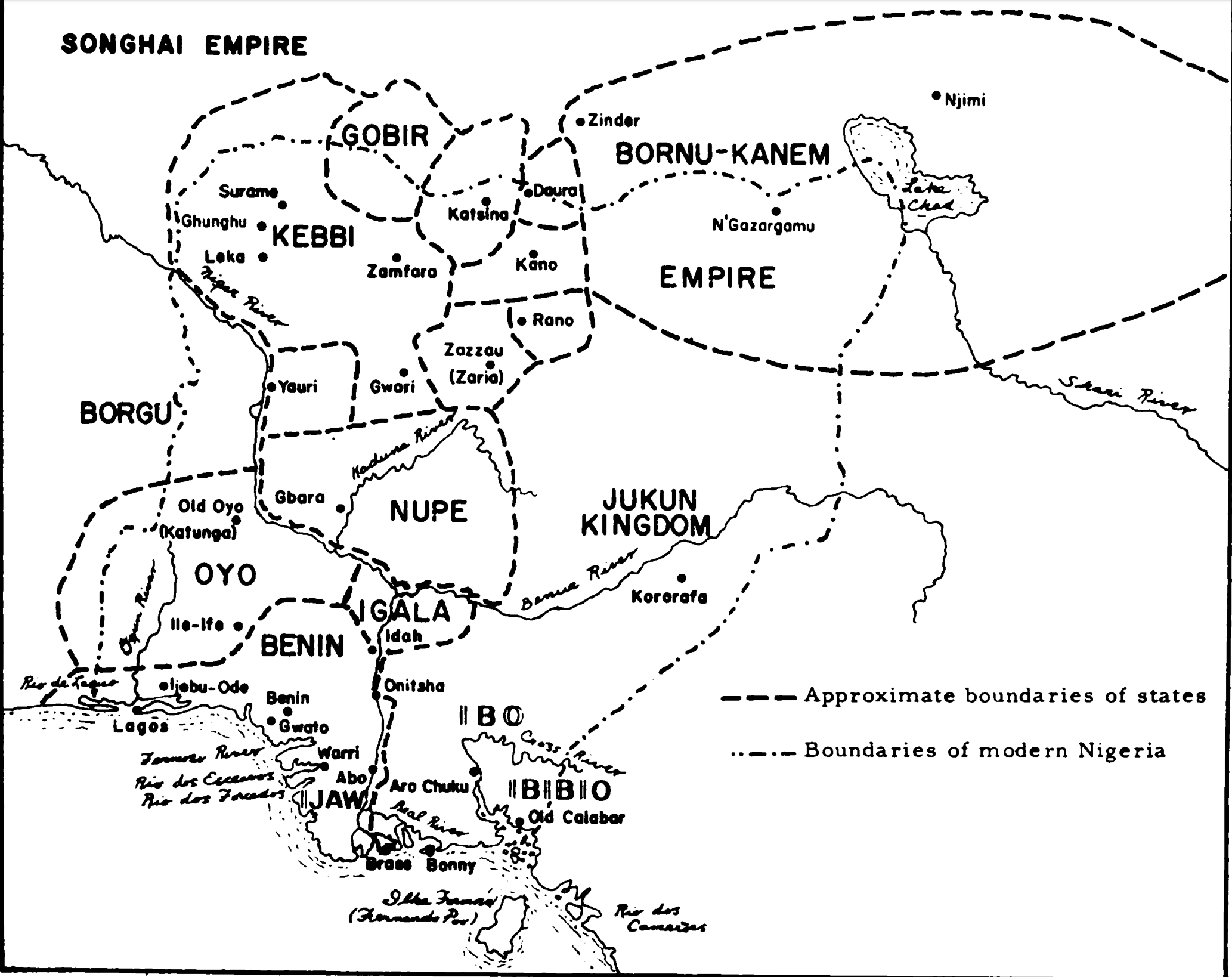
Kwararafa c. 16th century

=== Apogee ===
In the aftermath of Kwararafa's defeat by Bornu, there was an influx of refugees to the Benue Valley fleeing from persecution in the Muslim north, boosting the state's population as it became a bastion for traditional religion. Using profits from the salt industry of the Benue Valley, Kwararafa built up their army with cavalry, and traded slaves to Europeans on the coast for various commodities. This second phase was one of prosperity, ending with the reign of King Kenjo from around 1610. From around 1600, the region likely saw an influx of Jukun migration from the south in modern-day Cameroon. (Note: Jukun tradition disputes this timeline. They hold that they migrated out of modern-day Yemen, across Kordofan, Fittri, Mandara (in Cameroon), Gongola, and finally into the Benue Valley.)

In the late 16th and early 17th centuries, Kwararafa launched a series of attacks against Kano, forcing their population to seek refuge at Daura. Kwararafa's attacks were so pernicious that around 1650 Kano and Katsina signed a peace treaty in an effort to counter them. In 1653, Kano's ruler was forced into exile, and in 1671 the population again had to seek refuge at Daura. In 1680, Kwararafa assaulted Katsina and Zazzau, and invaded the Bornu Empire, sacking its capital (Ngasargamu). The Bornu mai (Ali III) expelled the Kwararafa, allegedly sending three captives back with their ears severed around their necks.

=== Decline and successor ===
Throughout the 18th century, the region experienced further waves of Jukun migration and Kwararafa entered into decline. This was caused by internal disputes and external attacks, amid natural disasters such as drought. By the end of the 18th century, Kwararafa paid tribute to Bornu and the Jukun had become the dominant power in the Benue Valley. In the early 19th century, they resisted the Fula jihads of the Sokoto Caliphate. A Chamba invasion forced the last king, Adi Matswen (r. 1780-1810), into exile. Kwararafa's collapse caused out-migration for the Idoma, Igala, Igbira, and Alago among others. By 1820, a Jukun dynasty at Wukari had taken control of the remains of the Kwararafa state, and claimed to be its successor. This new Jukun-homogenous state was peaceful in contrast to Kwararafa's martiality, and sought only to maintain their religious cults and venerate their leaders. The Wukari Federation was conquered by the British and incorporated into the colony as a form of indirect rule. As Nigerians gained independence and inherited the colony in 1960, the Wukari Federation continues to exist today as a non-sovereign monarchy.

== Economy ==
Kwararafa engaged in both trans-Saharan and Atlantic trade. They controlled the salt mines of the Benue Valley, and salt was traded for horses which were used as cavalry. Salt was also traded for slaves, who were in turn traded to the Europeans for various commodities. Calabar was known as the "Port of Kwararafa". The Abakwariga institution of Sangari was involved in the administration of all Jukun settlements, and is said to have been responsible for the collection of taxes.
