= Wukari Federation =

- Traditional state
- Location in Nigeria
- Coordinates: 7°51′N 9°47′E
- Country: Nigeria
- State: Taraba State

Government
  - Aku Uka: Shekarau Angyu Masa-Ibi Kuvyon II

The Wukari Federation is a traditional state in Nigeria, a successor to the Kwararafa state of the Jukun people. The state is based in the town of Wukari in Taraba State, in the south of the Benue River basin. The ruler takes the title "Aku Uka".

== Early history ==
Wukari Federation
- c. 1840–c. 1900
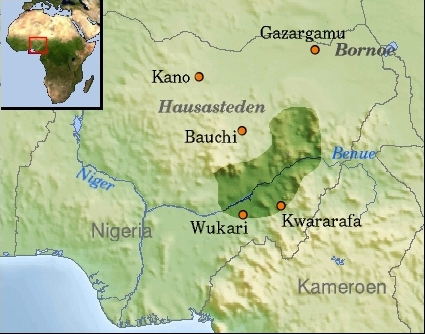
- Status: Federation
- Capital: Wukari
- Common languages: Jukun Takum language
- Historical era: Middle Ages
  - Established: c. 1840
  - Disestablished: c. 1900
Preceded by	Succeeded by
Kwararafa	Southern Nigeria Protectorate

The Jukun were established in Wukari as early as the 17th century. The town was one of the southern centers on a trading route that connected via Bauchi to the northern states of Katsina, Kano and Bornu. Large caravans would bring goods transported from north of the Sahara, exchanging them for slaves, salt and ivory.

It is debatable whether the Jukun were ever the military leaders of the broader Kwararafa state, as is sometimes claimed, or whether the Aku's role was more a symbolic or ritual leadership of the different peoples of the Benue river basin. Clearly the Aku Uka of Wukari had considerable influence. For example, in 1780 the leader of a group of migrants from Bornu felt it necessary to apply to the Aku Uka for endorsement and recognition of his rule over their new settlement at Lafia, to the northwest. The Aku Uka agreed and gave him the title of Sarkin Lafia Bare-Bari.

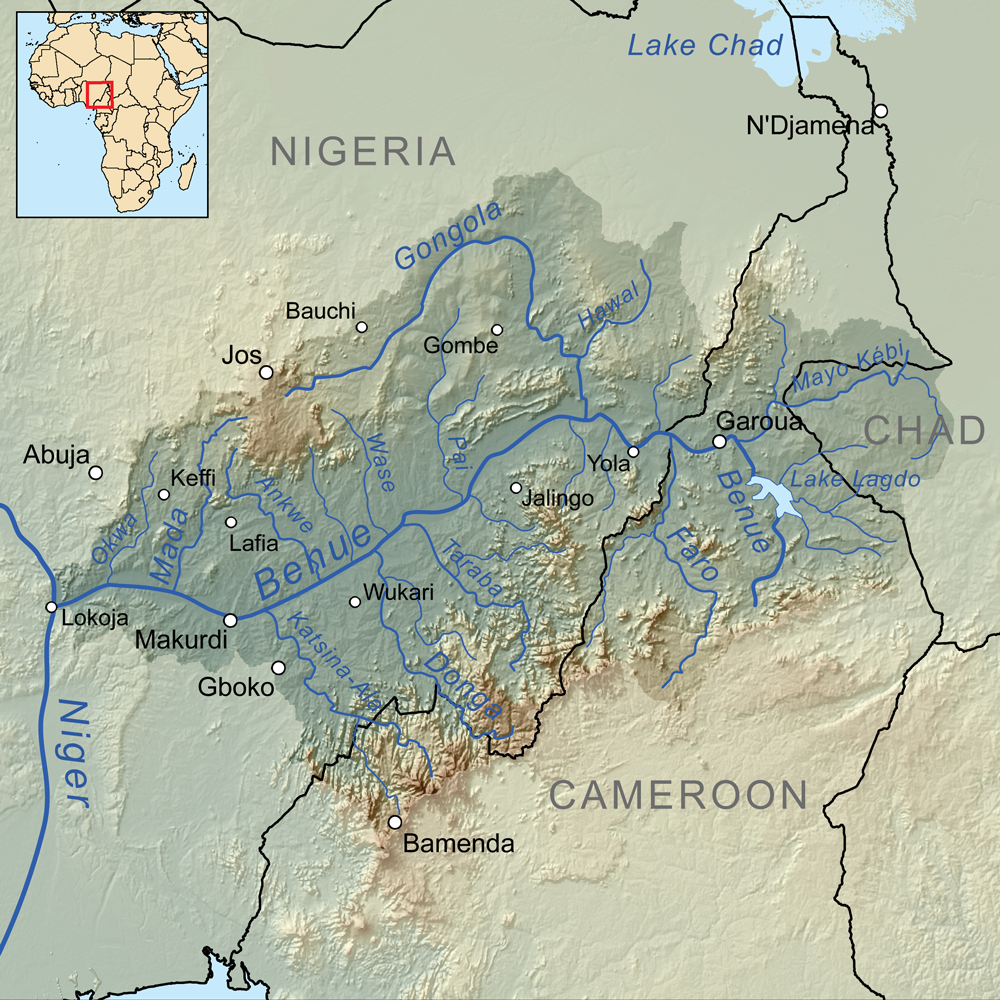
Benue river basin. Wukari is near the confluence of the Donga and Benue rivers, west of the Donga and south of the Benue.

The Aku Uka of Wukari became the regional power in the 1840s after the once-powerful Kwararafa state had been destroyed during the Fulani jihad (1804–1810) and its aftermath. The consolidation of Wukari as an independent state may have been given impetus by pressure from the Chamba people, who were pushing westward down the Benue at that time.

When the British incorporated the state into the protectorate of Nigeria around 1900, it was multi-ethnic, including Tiv and Moslem Hausa-Fulani people as well as the original Jukun. The British delegated much authority to traditional rulers in the Northern Region. In 1958 the Aku Uka of Wukari was one of four such rulers serving as a minister without portfolio in the Executive Council of the region, the others being the Sultan of Sokoto, Emir of Katsina and Emir of Kano.

== Religion ==
Traditional Jukun beliefs and rituals are complex, with unique elements. For example, they thought that in their migration from Yemen to Kwararafa around 596 AD they were assisted by giant crocodiles, who were therefore protected, and still have a shrine in the Marmara pond at Wukari. The Jukun religion includes belief in the divine right of kingship, with the Aku Uka being considered son of a god. Of several gods, the sun god is paramount. The religion includes belief in communicating with the souls of the dead.

These similarities to Egyptian beliefs have led some anthropologists to speculate that the Jukun originally came from Sudan. The Kuteb people, who speak a related language and live just to the south of the Jukun, have a tradition that they migrated from Egypt about a thousand years ago, but their religion is very different.

The Wukari people adhered to their traditional religion for many years after loss of independence, and some still practice it. The first Christian missionaries arrived in 1905, and the first mission station was opened on 29 May 1906. In 1914 one of the missionaries at the station, Rev. W. Maxwell, published the St. Mark's gospel in the Jukun dialect of Wukari Wapan. Progress was slow, with a small congregation and no indigenous pastors as late as the 1950s. Although many of the Jukun are now Christian, some are animist and some are Muslim. The Aku Uka, Shekarau Angyu Masa Ibi is a Christian and worships in the Chapel established in the Palace by The Christian Reformed Church of Nigeria (CRCN).

== Recent times ==
Wukari is multi-ethnic. While the Jukun consider that it is their traditional homeland, other ethnic groups including the Tiv and Hausa have been present for over 200 years. In the 1910s, the colonial authorities encouraged immigration of Tivs to the region, although they were considered an "inferior group" with no history of central state administration, and were placed under the authority of the Jukun Aku Uka. Continued Tiv expansion into Wukari was due in part to population pressure, and in part to unsustainable slash-and-burn farming methods.

In the 19th century, the Tiv allied with the Jukun to fight the Hausa/Fulani. More recently, the Tiv and the Hausa have at times allied against the Jukun. However, under the First Republic (1963–1966), the Jukun and Hausa supported the Northern People's Congress, while the Tiv supported the rival United Middle Belt Congress, often leading to violent conflict. During the Second Republic (1979–1983) both the Tiv and the Jukun supported the National Party of Nigeria.

There were clashes in 1990 and 1991 related to whether Wukari should become part of Tiv-dominated Benue State or Jukun-majority Taraba State. In June 1992, a Jukun member of the Taraba state assembly, the only woman, was assassinated. The Jukun accused the Tiv of the murder, and further violence broke out. During this period, as many as 5,000 people may have been killed and many more forced to move. In 2001 and 2002 there were again clashes between the Jukun, Tiv, Kuteb and Fulani people of the Federation.

In August 2010 there was further fighting, this time along religious rather than ethnic lines. Christians disputed the construction of a mosque at the Wukari Police divisional headquarters, and started rioting a few days before a planned visit of the Moslem Sultan of Sokoto, Muhammad Sa'ad Abubakar III. Lives were lost and property destroyed. The Aku Uka of Wukari and chairman of the Taraba State Traditional Council, Dr. Shakaru Angyu, had reportedly warned the Area Commander against the building of the mosque, which was destroyed during the disturbances.

On a more positive note, Wukari traditions such as the rituals of the crocodile shrine are of interest to tourists. The annual Nwonyo Fishing Festival, which has its origins in 1826, includes boat and canoe racing, diving, swimming, and traditional dancing, and there is a prize for the person who catches the heaviest fish. The competition takes place at the Nwonyo lake, said to have been discovered in 1816 by the founder of Ibi, Buba Wurbo, and the first public festival was held during the reign of Abgumanu II (1903–1915). After a ritual to appease the gods of the river, when the fishing contest began in April 2010 the winner caught a fish weighing 318 kg.

== Rulers ==
Jukun rulers of the Wukari Federation, with title "Aku Uka", were:

Start	End	Ruler
1833	1845	Zikenyu Tsokwa Tasefu
1845	1860	Agbumanu I Agbu
1860	1871	Ashumanu II Jibo Kindonya
1871	1903	Awudumanu I Abite
1903	1915	Agbumanu II Agbunshu
1915	1927	Ashumanu III Ali
1927	1940	Agbumanu III Amadu
1940	1945	Ashumanu IV Angyu Masa Ibi
1945	May 1960	Agbumanu IV Atoshi
1960	1970	Ashumanu V Adi Byewi
1970	1974	Awudumanu II Abe Ali
1974	1976	Agbumanu V Adda Ali
1976	2021	Shekarau Angyu Masa Ibi Kuvyon II
2022		Manu Ishaku Adda Ali
