= 2022 Malaysian state elections =

Elections in Malaysia

2022 Malaysian state election
- 12 March 2022 (Johor); 19 November 2022 (Pahang, Perlis, Perak)

4 out of 13 state legislatures (DUN)
- Results of the elections: Barisan Nasional Gain; Perikatan Nasional Gain; Hung Parliament; No election/Federal Territories

State elections in 2022 were first held in Johor in March 2022 after the dissolution of the legislative assembly in January 2022.

On 10 October 2022, Prime Minister Ismail Sabri Yaakob announced in a special announcement on television that the Dewan Rakyat would be dissolved, hence paving way for the 15th General Election. Additionally, he recommended that other states with the exception of Johor, Malacca, Sarawak & Sabah do the same.

Consequently, Barisan Nasional Chairman, Datuk Seri Dr Ahmad Zahid Hamidi proclaimed that the legislative assemblies of BN-led states (Perlis, Pahang & Perak) would be dissolved simultaneously. On 14 October 2022, the Perlis and Pahang state legislatures were dissolved. Perak followed suit three days later.

== Important Dates ==
State Legislature	Dissolution Date	Election Date
Johor	22 January 2022	12 March 2022
Perlis	14 October 2022	19 November 2022
Pahang	14 October 2022	19 November 2022
Perak	17 October 2022	19 November 2022
