= Bugaya =

Former king of Kano, Nigeria

- Sarkin Kano
- Reign: 1385 - 1390
- Predecessor: Yaji I
- Successor: Kanajeji
- Born: Muhammad
- House: Bagauda Dynasty
- Father: Tsamiya
- Mother: Maganarku

Muhammad Bugaya Dan Tsamiya, known as Bugaya, was a king of Kano who reigned from 1385 - 1390.

== Early life ==
Muhammad was the son of Tsamiya and Maganarku. After the betrayal and subsequent murder of his father by his uncle Usman Zamnagawa, his uncle tried to bed Maganarku but she told him she was pregnant. Zamnagawa then gave her herbs to abort the baby without her consent. She however still gave birth to a healthy child. This was how he earned the epithet "Bugaya". This would put his year of birth between 1343 and 1344.

== Life as Sultan ==
Bugaya came to power in 1385 after the death of his brother, Yaji I. Bugaya was said to have sent the Maguzawa from Fongui Rock and compelled them to disperse across the sultanate. Bugaya's reign was filled with peace and tranquility, most likely profiting from the reputation of his late older brother. Jizya was paid regularly throughout the sultanate and he enjoyed no rebellion. This allowed him to retire to a peaceful life after transferring all his royal duties to his Galadima (Administrator).

=== Death ===
Bugaya died in 1390 after ruling for five years. His body then washed and prepared in accordance with Islamic rites by Lawal, Jigawa, Turbana and Kusuba on the orders of Liman Madatai who prayed over his body. According to the Kano Chronicle, Bugaya was the first Kano ruler to be buried at Madatai. He was succeeded by his nephew, Kanajeji Dan Yaji.

== Biography in the Kano Chronicle ==
Below is a full biography of Bugaya from Palmer's 1908 English translation of the Kano Chronicle.

The 12th Sarki was Bugaya, called Mohammed. He had the same father and mother as Yaji. The name of his mother was Maganarku. The reason he was called Bugaya was as follows.

After Zamnagawa killed Tsamia, he made overtures to his widow Maganarku, but she said, “I am with child.” So Zamnagawa gave her drugs, without her knowledge, to procure an abortion. In spite of this, however, she gave birth to a living child, and gave him the name of Bugaya.

It was this Sarki who ordered the Maguzawa to leave the rock of Fongui and scatter themselves through the country. He then gave all power into the hands of the Galadima, and sought repose. The country was now peaceful, and regular tribute was paid to the Sarki. No one knew anything of his character even to the day of his death. He reigned 5 years.

When he died the Liman Madatai was ordered to pray over his body and Lowal to wash it and Turbana, Jigawa and Kusuba to help him. They washed the body and put it in a shroud, and took it out to burial. The Liman prayed over the body. Bugaya was the first Sarkin Kano who was buried at Madatai.

— Kano Chronicle

| Preceded by Yaji I | Sarkin Kano; 1385-1390 | Succeeded by Kanajeji |
